= Peter Reinhold =

German publisher and politician (1887–1955)

Reich Minister for Finance
- In office 20 January 1926 – 29 January 1927
- President: Paul von Hindenburg
- Chancellor: Hans Luther; Wilhelm Marx
- Preceded by: Hans Luther (acting)
- Succeeded by: Heinrich Köhler

Member of the Reichstag for Hesse-Nassau
- In office 20 May 1928 – 31 July 1932

Minister of Finance of Saxony
- In office 6 April 1920 – 13 December 1920
- In office 4 January 1924 – 27 January 1926
- Prime Minister: Georg Gradnauer (1920); Wilhelm Buck (1920-1923); Max Heldt (1924-1926)

Parliament Member of the Saxon State Parliament
- In office 1919–1924

Personal details
- Born: 1 December 1887 Blasewitz, Kingdom of Saxony, German Empire
- Died: 1 April 1955 (aged 67) Capri, Italy
- Party: DDP (1918-1930); DStP (1930-1933)
- Spouse: Caroline Merck (m. 1917)

Academic background
- Education: Doctor of Philosophy
- Thesis: Die Empörung König Heinrichs (VII.) gegen seinen Vater (1911)
- Doctoral advisor: Gerhard Seeliger

Peter Reinhold (1 December 1887 - 1 April 1955) was a German publisher and politician of the DDP during the Weimar Republic. He most famously served as Reich Minister for Finance from 1926 to 1927 in the cabinets of Hans Luther and Wilhelm Marx.

Reinhold was born in Blasewitz, and during his youth studied a wide range of subjects including history, art history, literature, economics and ethnology around Europe. After settling in Germany, he received his Doctor of Philosophy degree in 1911 from Leipzig University on English history. He then entered the publishing field in 1913, eventually co-founding Der Neue Geist. Reinhold entered politics in 1917 by joining the state assemblies of Saxony, the Volkskammer and the Landtag, as a member of the DDP. Three years later, in 1920, he became Reich Minister of Finance of Saxony in the cabinet of Georg Gradnauer, a position he was let go of that year but which he returned to from 1924 to 1926. During this time he heavily criticized then Reich Minister of Finance, Otto von Schlieben, for his "faulty revenue estimates" and instead suggested using a surplus and deficit.

Six years later, in the cabinet of Hans Luther, he was appointed Reich Minister for Finance. During this time, he suggested using tax cuts to stimulate the economy, but that it relied on the Reichstag stopped voting on expenditures. He described this strategy as "close to the limit of a deficit", a position that had never been done by his predecessors, but also prioritized making sure Dawes Plan payments would go through. In the end, his suggestions were eliminated by interest groups and it causing budgetary difficulties and he restored to a strict limit on spending. Following the rest of the cabinet, he resigned in December 1926 but kept the position until January 1927.

During his later years of his career he was a member of the Reichstag for Wahlkreis 19 from 1928 to 1932, and was a member of the supervisory board of many banks, and became a lecturer in the United States from 1927 to 1928 to advocate for the Dawes Plan at the Institute of Policy at Williams College. The last important position he would hold was as Chairman of the Merck Group - his wife was also part of the Merck family as the daughter of Carl Emanuel Merck - from 1953 until his death in 1955.

== Early life ==
Peter Reinhold was born on 1 December 1887 at Blasewitz, then a suburb of Dresden, in the German Empire. Reinhold was the son of H. L. Reinhold (1853–1935), a general director, and Gertrud Staudinger, who was an ancestor of Lucas Andreas Staudinger who founded the first agricultural teaching institution in Germany in Groß Flottbek. He completed his abitur in 1906 at the Vitzthumschen Gymnasium. After completing his abitur, he studied a wide range of subjects including history, art history, literature, economics and ethnology around Europe in the cities of Freiburg im Breisgau, Rome, Geneva, Berlin, and Leipzig. He received his Doctor of Philosophy in 1911 for a thesis titled Die Empörung König Heinrichs (VII.) gegen seinen Vater (The indignation of King Henry (VII) against his father), which examined the relationship between the English kings Henry VIII and Henry VII of England, from Leipzig University. His doctoral advisor for the thesis was the German historian Gerhard Seeliger, although he also received help from the academians Erich Brandenburg and Karl Weule.

He travelled abroad following the completion of his thesis, but returned to Germany in 1913 to take over the newspaper Leipziger Tageblatt, which he sold to Ullstein Verlag in 1921 in order to devote himself to his political activities fully. In addition to this, he founded the publishing house Der Neue Geist in 1917 alongside Kurt Wolff, who was his brother-in-law, which focused on history and he continued to run until 1946 despite Wolff leaving. During this time he also owned Europäische Revue, a conservative pro-European integration magazine that was very influential during the interwar period, which was published by Der Neue Geist.

== Political career ==
=== Saxon state government ===
In 1919 he was elected to the Saxon Volkskammer and the Landtag, the state assemblies of Saxony, as a member of the DDP for constituency two. In that same election, the left-wing Socialist parties, the DDP and SPD, gained the majority of the votes although the SPD formed a minority government which excluded the DDP. He was repeatedly re-elected until 1926, but he left the assemblies on 9 February 1924 in order to focus full-time as being Minister of Finance of Saxony.

In the Volkshammer he opposed the creation of a holiday commemorating 9 November (Schicksalstag), when the republic was proclaimed, arguing that it encouraged social tensions and highlighted class tension and proclaimed it a day which should not be celebrated and felt like rhetoric used by the right, a position which would be widely referenced. During his time in the Landtag he was also part of the Accountability Committee, the Budget Committee, and the Legal Affairs Committee, and served as chairman of the DDP parliamentary group.

He was appointed Reich Minister of Finance of Saxony on 6 April 1920 in the cabinet of Georg Gradnauer, a position he would hold until 13 December 1920. He regained this position in the cabinet of Max Heldt from 4 January 1924 to 27 January 1926. He advocated for a cultural foundation to preserve the cultural assets of Saxony in this role. He also criticized the "faulty revenue estimates" of Otto von Schlieben and so the heavy tax load had led to a cut in production, and instead suggested using the surplus and a deficit, a position shared by Hermann Höpker-Aschoff who was the Minister of Finance of Prussia.

=== Reich Minister of Finance ===
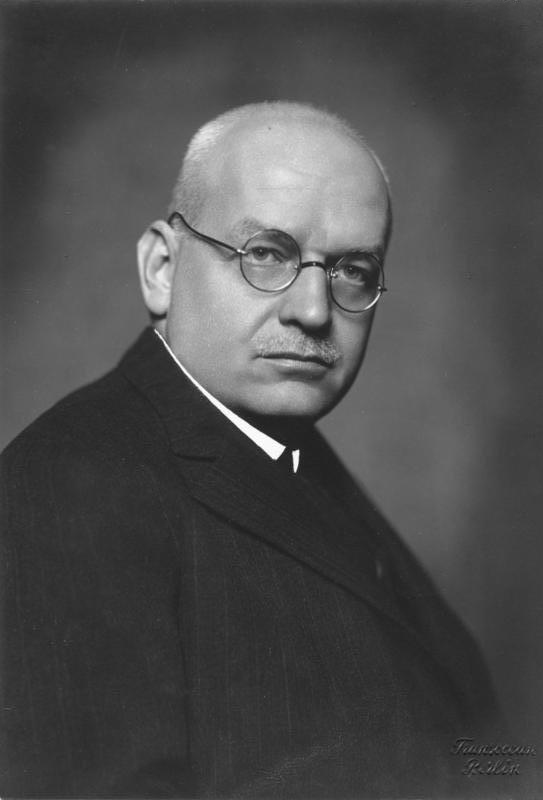
Then chancellor, Hans Luther, who appointed Reinhold as Minister of Finance.

Reinhold was appointed Reich Minister for Finance in the second Hans Luther cabinet on 20 January 1926.

He drew criticism from the DNVP when he drafted a plan to rearrange the locations of Reich ministries which was criticized as an enabling act.

Reinhold said that tax cuts were needed to stimulate the economy, utilizing money from the Productive Unemployment Welfare Fund, suggesting that there needed to be a reduction of value-added tax, merger tax, and stock exchange tax. He said that these measures were possible if the Reichstag prevented voting on expenditures without ensuring revenues. Reinhold also planned to stimulate exports in order to increase job opportunities. He explained his strategy as "close to the limit of a deficit", which broke from many of his predecessors as minister. However, he also prioritized guaranteeing that the Dawes Plan payments would go through. Reinhold had previously criticized Otto von Schlieben’s surplus policies.

However, the law which became known as the "tax mitigation law" was defused because of interest groups, and it led to the expenditures causing budgetary difficulties. He also ran into trouble as he cast doubt that annuities that were supposed to be due to the United States under the Dawes plan would ever be able to be met. He then advocated on a strict limit on spending because of this, although there was an upswing of the economy in 1927.

On 17 December 1926 the Third Marx cabinet resigned, but he continued as part of a caretaker government. He officially left the post as minister on 29 January 1927. Subsequently, it was debated that the German slump a few years later was not caused by Reinhold, but the failure to follow up on his budget plan and a return to fiscal orthodoxy. His budget was described as corporatist.

=== Reichstag ===
He became a member of the Reichstag after the 1928 elections. He represented Wahlkreis 19, Hesse-Nassau. He was the sole representative in Wahlkreis 19 to receive a mandate representing the party. In July 1930 he became a member of the DStP because the DDP merged with the People's National Association of the Reich.

He lost his seat in the July 1932 German federal election as part of a large debacle where the DStP lost its influence.

=== Later career ===
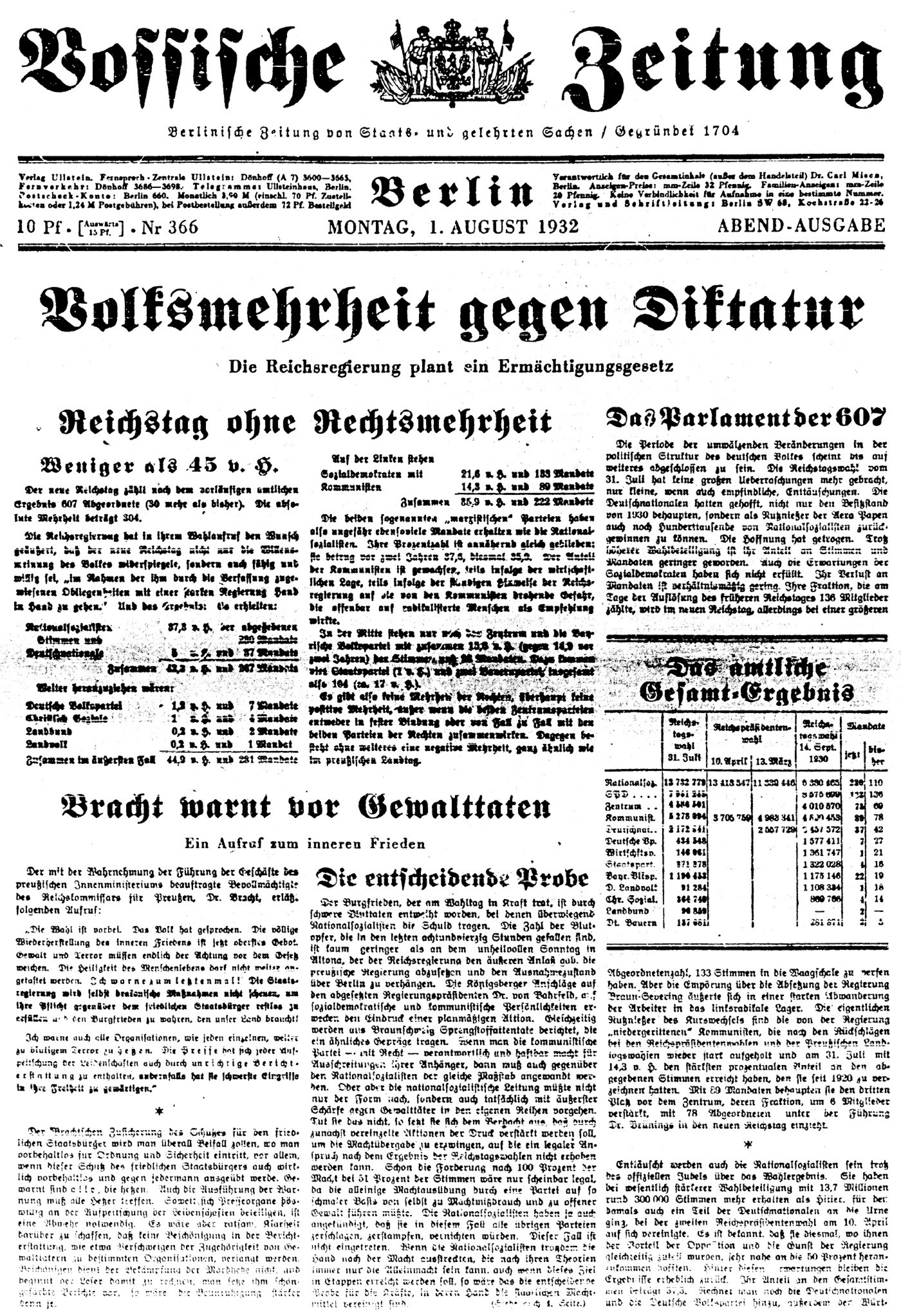
The front page of the newspaper Vossische Zeitung in 1932. Reinhold worked here from 1930 to 1933.

During and after leaving the Reichstag, he was a member of the supervisory board of many different banks, Ullstein, and VEM Sachsenwerk. He founded the Central Bank of German Industrialists to grant loans to German companies from the United States in 1928. This came after frequent travel to the United States in 1927 and 1928, where he spoke about the Dawes Plan to the Institute of Policy at Williams College at round tables, alongside people like Carlo Sforza. From 1930 to 1933 he also walked as an employee at the newspaper Vossische Zeitung.

After 1933, Reinhold was no longer active in politics. During the Nazi Party era he was the owner of a fabric and paper factory in Hirschberg (now Jelenia Góra, Poland) and was the operating manager of a paper factory in Halle. After the war, he lived in West Germany and worked as a private lecturer at Yale University and the University of Oxford. He served was a member and Chairman of the Merck Group from 1953 until his death in 1955.

== Personal life ==
In 1917 he married Caroline Merck, a of the businessman Carl Emanuel Merck, who came from the powerful Merck family in Darmstadt. Their marriage produced two sons: Lukas-Andreas (born 1918) and Peter (born 1928).

=== Death ===
On 1 April 1955 Reinhold died in Capri, Italy.
