= Saxony in the German Revolution (1918–1919) =

German state in the early Weimar Republic

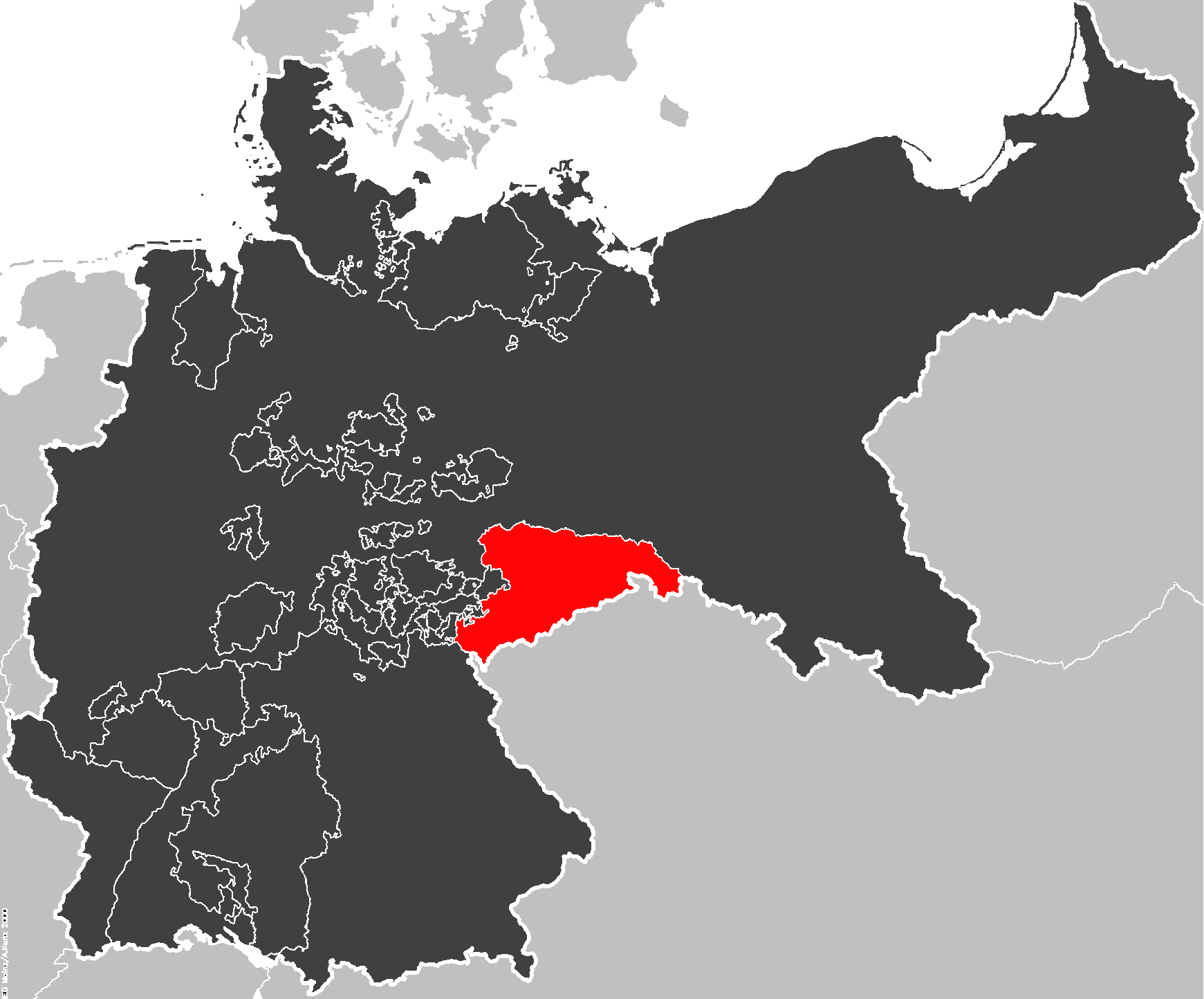
Location of Saxony within the German Empire, 1918

Saxony in the German Revolution (1918–1919) followed a path that went from early control by workers' and soldiers' councils to the adoption of a republican constitution in a series of events that roughly mirrored those at the national level in Berlin. Because some members of the revolutionary councils, which were set up in major cities such as Dresden, Leipzig and Chemnitz, wanted a soviet-style council government while others favored a parliamentary republic, there was considerable internal disagreement that caused a split between the two groups. In early February 1919, elections were held for a state assembly, the Volkskammer, in which the moderates gained control. An outbreak of violence at the time of the March 1920 Kapp Putsch led the national government to forcibly remove the Leipzig workers' council, the last one remaining in the state. Saxony went on to become a constituent state within the Weimar Republic in November 1920.

== Establishment of workers' and soldiers' councils ==
As in other German states, including at the national level in Berlin, workers' and soldiers' councils were set up across Saxony at the beginning of the German Revolution in early November 1918. During state-wide mass demonstrations, protesters in Leipzig and Dresden occupied a number of government buildings, including the army and police headquarters in Dresden. On 8 November, the Saxon king, Frederick Augustus III, fled to Moritzburg Castle northwest of Dresden after a workers' and soldiers' council took over control of the city. The council, made up of communist Spartacists and members of the radical socialist Independent Social Democratic Party (USPD), called itself the United Revolutionary Workers' and Soldiers' Council of Greater Dresden (Vereinigte Revolutionäre Arbeiter- und Soldatenrat Groß-Dresden). Two days later, it declared that the King had been deposed and the monarchy abolished. At the Circus Sarrasani building in Dresden, Hermann Fleissner of the USPD declared the "Social Republic of Saxony".

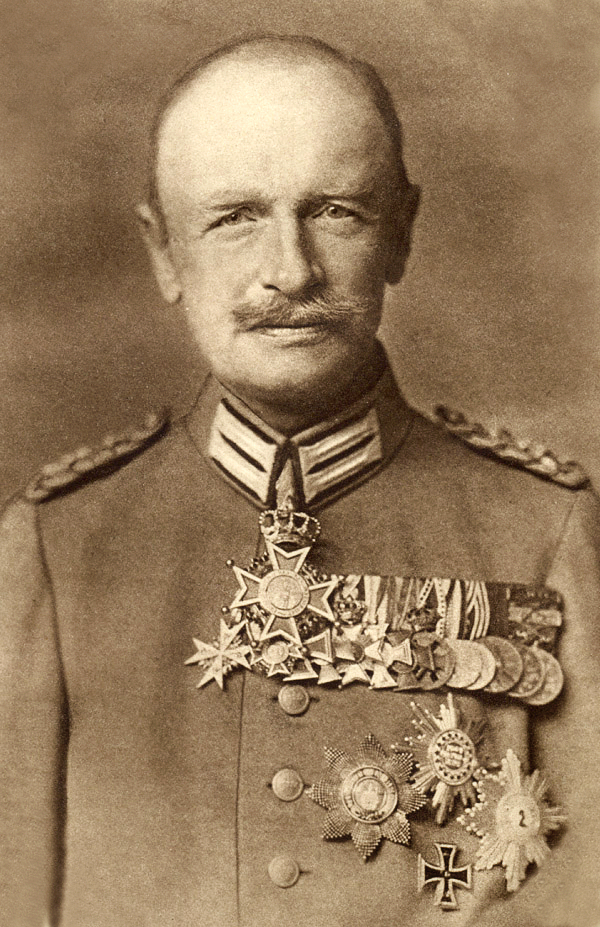
Friedrich August III, the last king of Saxony, in 1914

King Frederick Augustus, who had left Moritzburg for Guteborn in Prussia, abdicated on 13 November and requested that state officials continue to serve the "Fatherland". On the fifteenth, a new government (Zentralrat, or Central Council) made up of three members (Volksbeauftragte) of the USPD and three of the more centrist Majority Social Democratic Party (MSPD) was established following lengthy discussions between the two parties. From Dresden, Leipzig and Chemnitz, they issued a "Proclamation to the People of Saxony", most of which had been written by Richard Lipinski of the USPD. In outlining the goals of the new government, it too asked that public officials remain at their positions in order to maintain order, a decision that left many adherents of the old regime in control of government functions. The proclamation went on to demand a centralized socialist Germany and continuation of the revolution until it was achieved. The new state it envisioned was to ensure freedom of association and religion, the eight-hour work day, a secure food supply and amnesty for those punished under the old system of "class justice". The immediate concerns of the MSPD, however, were maintaining order and providing for the basic needs of the people of Saxony, not a revolutionary restructuring of society. They pushed for local elections in January and for a state parliament (Volkskammer) that would write a constitution for Saxony. The elections would be held under universal, equal, direct and secret proportional representation for both men and women over the age of 21.

While the MSPD was working towards a parliamentary democracy, the USPD wanted to retain the workers' and soldiers' councils permanently. By 16 January 1919, the discord between the two parties had grown to such a level that the USPD, led by Lipinski, withdrew its three members from the Central Council in Dresden. The MSPD replaced them with its own members, giving them full control of the Council, with Georg Gradnauer serving as Saxony's minister president. New elections for the workers' and soldiers' councils at year-end led to significant wins for the MSPD in Dresden and Chemnitz. The results allowed the MSPD to increase its dominance over the USPD, although in Leipzig the USPD held on to control of the council. It dissolved the Leipzig City Council and took over the army group stationed in the city.

== Democratic elections, ongoing violence and end of the councils ==
In the 2 February elections for the Volkskammer, the MSPD and USPD together won 58% of vote. In the first sitting of the Volkskammer on 25 February, a minority government was formed after an attempt to build a coalition between the MSPD and USPD foundered over the USPD's demand for recognition of workers' councils. Gradnauer's preferred alternative, a coalition with the German Democratic Party (DDP), was rejected by the majority of MSPD delegates. Gradnauer continued on as minister president.

On 12 April 1919, Saxon Minister of War Gustav Neuring (MSPD) was killed by wounded and disabled war veterans who had heard that their benefits would be cut. On the following day the Saxon government declared a state of siege in Saxony, and on the 23rd a similar proclamation was issued by the Berlin government. The Freikorps unit Landjägerkorps of Major General Maercker entered Leipzig on 11 May, quieted the city with no loss of life and abolished the workers' council.

In mid-March 1920, right-wing opponents of the Weimar Republic instigated the Kapp Putsch in Berlin. In the demonstrations that broke out against it across Saxony, the worst violence occurred in Dresden, where 59 protesters were killed by government troops. There were also conflicts in Leipzig that the local communist leadership continued after the end of the putsch on 18 March, but government troops quickly put an end to the unrest and then burned the Leipzig union headquarters building, the Volkshaus.

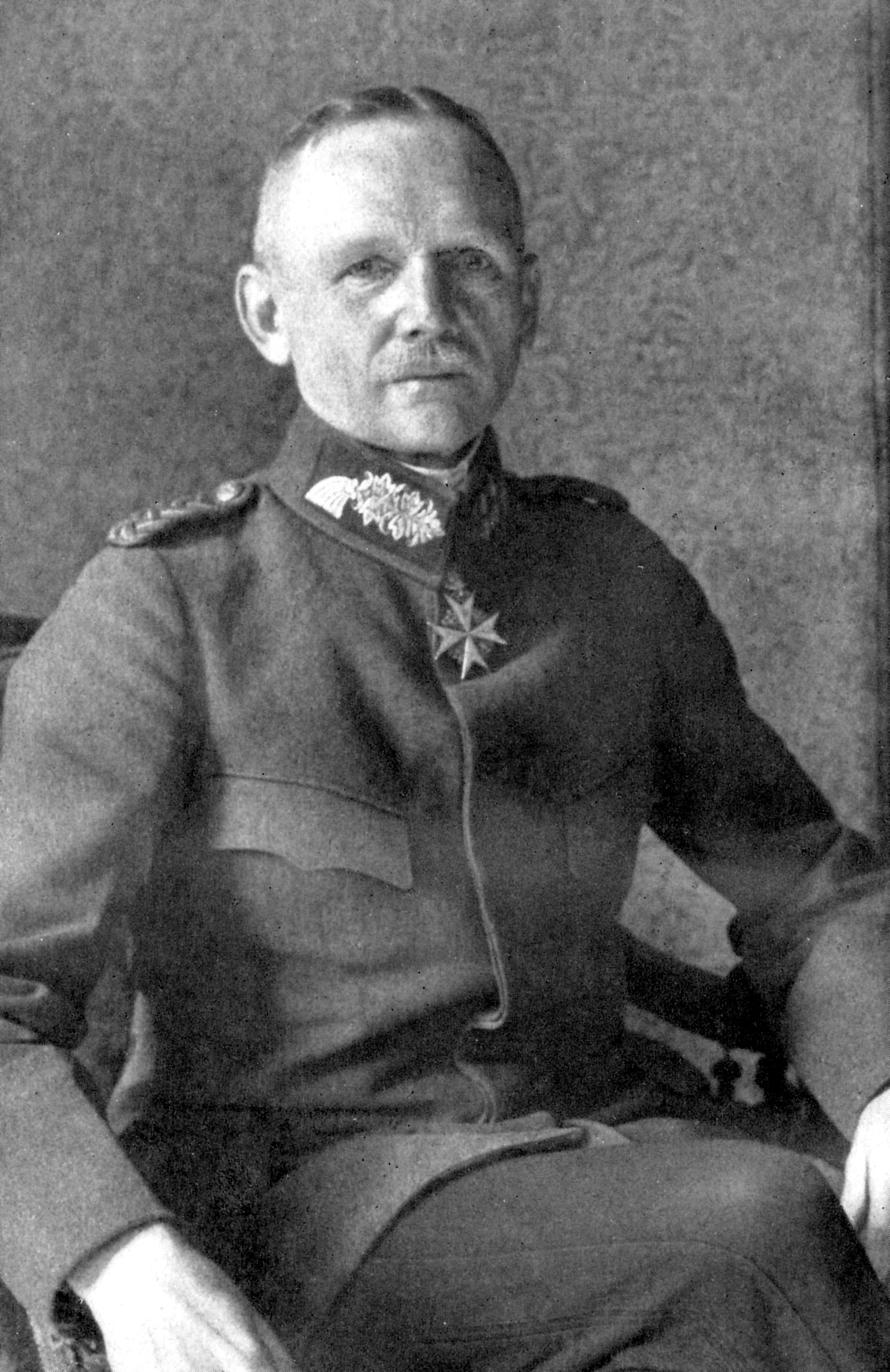
Major General Maercker, who with the help of the Freikorps abolished the workers' and soldiers' council in Leipzig

In October 1920, the Volkskammer as a constituent assembly adopted a republican constitution for Saxony and dissolved itself. On 14 November the first Saxon parliament was elected, with the socialist parties having small majority.

== Later communist activity in Saxony ==
The failed communist uprising in central Germany in March 1920, known as the March Action, took place primarily in the Prussian Province of Saxony rather than in Saxony itself, where the only notable events were failed bombings of government buildings in Dresden, Leipzig and Freiberg.

In October 1923, a series of crises affecting the Weimar Republic, the most significant of which was the Occupation of the Ruhr by French and Belgian troops, led the leadership of the Communist Party of the Soviet Union to pressure the Communist Party of Germany (KPD) to use the situation to start a revolution in Germany. The events that followed in Saxony, Thuringia and elsewhere across the Republic came to be known as the German October. On 10 October Saxony's minister president, Erich Zeigner, appointed two KPD members to his cabinet. Berlin demanded that he remove them and when he refused ordered a Reichsexekution – an armed intervention by the central government – against Saxony. Reichswehr troops entered Saxony on 23 October and removed Zeigner and his cabinet from office without violence or bloodshed. Because workers had shown themselves unwilling to fight, the KPD called off the attempt to start a revolution.

== See also ==
- Bavarian Soviet Republic
- Bremen Soviet Republic
- Würzburg Soviet Republic
