= Free State of Saxony (Weimar Republic) =

German state (1919–1933)

Free State of Saxony (Weimar Republic) Freistaat Sachsen
- State of the Weimar Republic and Nazi Germany
- Flag Coat of arms

- The Free State of Saxony (red) within the Weimar Republic

Anthem
- Sachsenlied
- Capital: Dresden
- Demonym: Saxon
- Area
  - Coordinates: 51°1′37″N 13°21′32″E
  - 1925: 14,986 km^{2} (5,786 sq mi)
- Population
  - 1925: 4,994,281
- Government
  - Type: Republic
- Minister-President
  - 1918–1919 (Revolutionary Period): Richard Lipinski
  - 1919–1920 (first): Georg Gradnauer
  - 1930–1933 (last): Walther Schieck
- Reichskommissar
  - 1933: Manfred Freiherr von Killinger
- Legislature: Landtag
- Historical era: Interwar
  - Established: 1919
  - Constitution enacted: 26 October 1920
  - Abolition (de facto): 7 April 1933
Preceded by	Succeeded by
Kingdom of Saxony	Gau Saxony
- Today part of: Germany

The Free State of Saxony (German: Freistaat Sachsen) was one of the constituent states of the federally organized Weimar Republic from 1919 to 1933. The Free State was established in 1919 as the successor to the Kingdom of Saxony and lasted until the Nazi regime effectively absorbed all of Germany's federal states in April 1933. Following the reunification of Germany in 1990, the name "Free State of Saxony" was taken up again and remains Saxony's official name.

The Free State of Saxony grew out of the German Empire's defeat in World War I and the German revolution of 1918–1919. King Frederick Augustus III of Saxony abdicated in November 1918 in the face of the revolutionary events, and workers' and soldiers' councils set up revolutionary governments in Dresden, Leipzig, Chemnitz and other Saxon cities. In a largely peaceful conflict between radical and moderate socialists on the councils, the moderates prevailed. A democratically elected constituent assembly passed a constitution for a republican Free State of Saxony in October 1920.

A minority of Saxon workers continued to push for a soviet-style council government, leading to sporadic outbreaks of violence in the early 1920s. In 1923, Minister-President Erich Zeigner appointed two members of the Communist Party of Germany (KPD) to his cabinet, following which the German government sent troops to forcibly remove them. Unknown to Zeigner and the Berlin government, Soviet Russia had been planning to use the events as a signal for a communist revolution across Germany. They had badly misjudged the overall workers' mood in Germany, and no uprising took place.

From 1924 until the onset of the Great Depression in 1929, the political and economic situations in Saxony improved. After Adolf Hitler became German chancellor in January 1933, Saxony's political leadership was replaced by Manfred von Killinger as Reich commissioner. The two Nazi Gleichschaltung (synchronization) laws in 1933 brought Saxony and all the other German states fully under Nazi control and effectively ended both the Weimar Republic and the Free State of Saxony. Saxony became part of East Germany after World War II and was dissolved as a political entity in 1952 before being revived in 1990.

== Background: Empire and World War I ==
The Free State of Saxony was the successor state of the Kingdom of Saxony, one of the 25 constituent states of the German Empire. The Kingdom was a constitutional monarchy under the House of Wettin, whose last king, Frederick Augustus III, ruled from 1904 to 1918. He and his government largely avoided taking major initiatives in the social and economic arenas, and he was often sceptical of the Empire's more activist politics. His family life had strong middle-class traits which helped make him a popular figure in Saxony. During his lifetime, Saxony developed into one of Germany's leading industrial regions. It was particularly strong in mining, iron production, machine building and textiles.

Saxony's government consisted of six ministries whose heads were appointed and dismissed by the king. The ministers were of equal rank, with no position equivalent to prime minister or chancellor. The Kingdom's 1831 constitution established a two-chamber parliament (Ständeversammlung) with an upper house whose members represented the royal family, nobility, clergy, Saxony's larger cities and Leipzig University, while the lower house was popularly elected. Only the king and his government could initiate bills; both chambers of parliament had to approve a proposed law for it to go into effect.

Initially, men 25 years and older who paid at least three marks in state taxes were eligible to vote. In an attempt by conservative voices in the Kingdom to stem the rapid growth of the Social Democratic Party (SPD), the electoral law was changed in 1896 to a three-class franchise in which votes were weighted based on how much the voter paid in taxes. As a result of the new law, the number of social democratic members in the 82-seat lower house dropped from 14 in 1895 to zero in 1901. In the 1903 election for the national Reichstag, in which all adult males had equal voting rights, the SPD took 22 of Saxony's 23 seats. Protests over the Kingdom's restrictive electoral law led to a change in 1909 to plural voting, under which a voter could receive up to four ballots according to criteria based on income, property, education and age. Under the new rules, the SPD took 25 seats in the 1909 election, which was the Kingdom's last.

At the start of World War I in 1914, Saxony was highly industrialized with a large socialist or socialist-leaning working class that had a limited political voice. As the fighting entered its third and fourth years, more and more of the economy was directed towards waging the war. Many smaller Saxon firms were forced to close due to a loss of business or to manpower shortages as workers were drafted into the armed forces or moved to war-critical positions. The textile industry suffered particularly badly and did not recover even after the war.

No significant political changes took place in Saxony until after the Reich constitutional reforms of October 1918, which made the government's ministers dependent on the confidence of the Reichstag rather than the emperor. Even then Saxony did not alter its electoral laws or constitution but simply invited two members of the Majority Social Democrats (MSPD) – the moderate wing of the SPD from which the more radical Independent Social Democrats (USPD) had split in 1917 – into the government, which for the first time was led by a National Liberal, Rudolf Heinze. The new government announced plans for constitutional changes and the democratization of the electoral law, but in the face of escalating revolutionary events they were never implemented.

== German revolution ==
=== Formation of workers' and soldiers' councils ===
The German revolution of 1918–1919 began at the end of October 1918 with the Kiel mutiny. Rebellious sailors set up a revolutionary workers' and soldiers' council at Kiel and in early November spread the revolt across Germany. Councils took power from the existing military, royal and civil authorities with little resistance or bloodshed. The revolution reached Berlin on 9 November, and Emperor Wilhelm II fled to Holland the next day.

Saxony's first council was set up by soldiers at the airbase at Großenhain, near Meissen, on 6 November. Two days later, workers' and soldiers' councils took control of both Leipzig and Chemnitz. In Leipzig, which had seen workers' councils on the Russian model during large-scale strikes in 1917, the workers were led by Richard Lipinski and the USPD. They and rebellious soldiers ousted the military general command, called a general strike and set up a workers' and soldiers' council that excluded the MSPD. In Chemnitz, where Gustav Noske, who gained notoriety as the Weimar Republic's first defense minister, was a leading figure in the MSPD, the workers' and soldiers' council was formed with ten representatives each from the MSPD, USPD and soldiers.

Two competing councils were formed in Dresden on 8 and 9 November. In one, the workers were members of the MSPD under Reichstag delegates Georg Gradnauer and Wilhelm Buck, and in the second all were from the USPD, led by Hermann Fleissner and Otto Rühle. The USPD-led council proved to be stronger and was able to take over the administrative machinery of Dresden and the Kingdom of Saxony on 9 November. Following overnight negotiations, the two councils announced a "united revolutionary workers' and soldiers' council" with an equal number of representatives from the MSPD and USPD. The MSPD's leaders had agreed to step down since they were considered to have been compromised by the MSPD's support of the war in the imperial Reichstag. In their place, Albert Schwarz from the metal workers' union assumed leadership of the MSPD on the council. At a mass meeting held the next day, Fleissner issued a proclamation on the council's behalf that promised abolition of the monarchy and the two-chamber Landtag, announced an agreement with state ministers for them to continue provisionally in their roles, and called for the election of a constituent assembly to draft a democratic constitution for Saxony. The proclamation made it clear that they wanted to see a parliamentary republic rather than a soviet-style council republic.

=== Abdication of King Frederick Augustus III ===
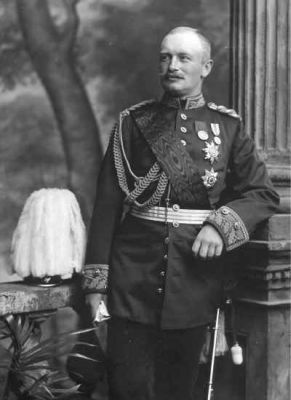
Frederick Augustus III, the last king of Saxony. He abdicated on 13 November 1918.

In a cabinet meeting on 8 November, King Frederick Augustus III said that he did not want the war that had just ended to be continued with the spilling of blood on the streets of Dresden. That evening, as revolutionary soldiers took control of the city, he left for Moritzburg Castle, a short distance to the northwest. At first he hoped that the MSPD would support the establishment of a parliamentary monarchy in Saxony, but when it became clear that they would not, he renounced the throne from Guteborn in Prussian Brandenburg on 13 November and asked Saxony's sworn officials to continue to do their duty. On the fifteenth, Frederick Augustus settled at Sibyllenort Palace near Breslau in Silesia, where he died in 1932. The royal family was allowed to keep a generous share of its private fortune in the form of land, dwellings and artwork.

The King's statement of abdication did not include the heir to the throne, his 25-year-old son Georg. The omission was deliberate because he wanted Georg to be able to assume the title of King of Saxony in the event that the monarchy was restored at some later date. When Georg was requested to renounce his claim from Neschwitz in eastern Saxony where he had taken refuge, he refused. Not long after, his decision to dedicate his life to the Catholic Church led to his renunciation of any claim to the throne. Georg went on to become a priest and member of the Jesuit Order.

=== Revolutionary government ===
The USPD and MSPD formed a provisional revolutionary government for Saxony on 15 November 1918. Called the Council of the People's Deputies (Rat der Volksbeauftragten), it was made up of three members from each party, with the USPD holding the key posts (interior, war and finance). Richard Lipinski of the USPD was chosen to lead the council. On 16 November it issued a statement confirming that existing members of the civil service would continue to exercise their former responsibilities, although the workers' and soldiers' councils would have oversight over individual officials. The government's program, which was issued on the 18th, stated that its purpose was "to lead the state out of the great difficulties of the present situation, to secure democratic gains and to carry out economic restructuring in accordance with socialist principles”. Freedom of the press, association and assembly were guaranteed. The program also promised an eight-hour workday, the separation of church and state, the introduction of a unified school system, modernization and democratization of the administration of justice, implementation of full self-government in municipalities and an amnesty “primarily for persons who, out of necessity, have violated laws or war regulations”. Some of the objectives, such as the eight-hour day and the amnesty, were implemented quickly, but there was little progress made in matters affecting schools and the church or with socialist economic restructuring. Providing food for the population remained a significant problem in the face of the continued Allied blockade of Germany, which was not fully lifted until 12 July 1919. Freedom of the press and of assembly were ensured as promised, including for the citizens' councils (Bürgerräte) which were set up to represent middle class interests in opposition to the workers' and soldiers' councils. Members of the middle class had been prohibited from participating in the revolutionary bodies.

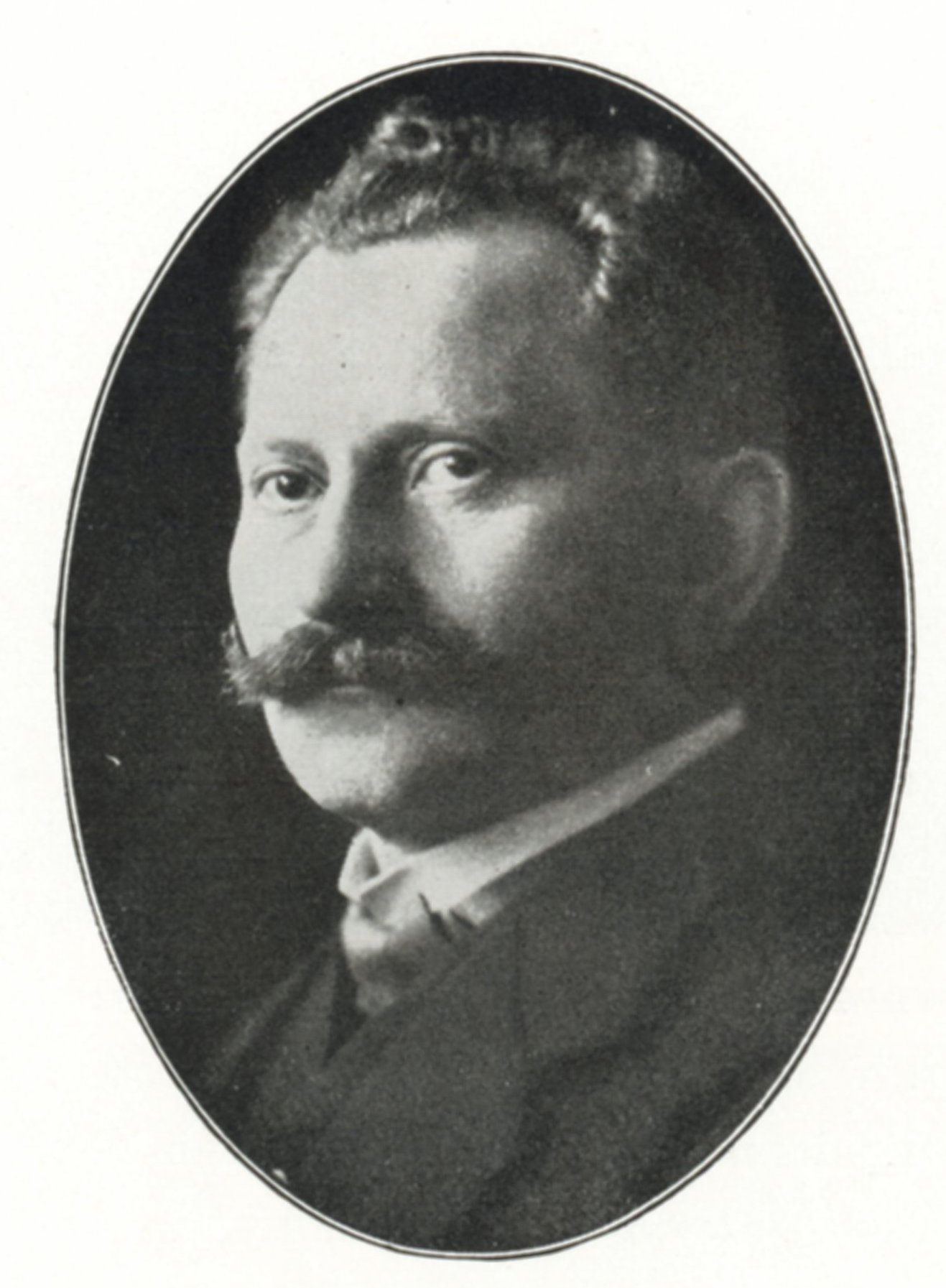
Georg Gradnauer, second leader of Saxony's revolutionary government and its first minister-president

The question of whether Saxony was to become a council republic or a parliamentary democracy quickly became a major issue that divided the radical and moderate factions of the Left. The USPD wanted a council republic controlled by workers, or at least a synthesis of the councils with a parliament, while the MSPD advocated a parliamentary republic. If there was to be a parliament, the USPD's Lipinski favored delaying the election until after socialist gains had been solidified, but Gradnauer of the MSPD pushed to schedule it as early as possible. In late November, an election was held to make Saxony's still provisional workers' and soldiers' councils permanent. The USPD blocked the elections in Leipzig and Zwickau, but in Dresden and Chemnitz, where salaried employees and civil servants were added to the ranks of eligible voters, the MSPD was the clear winner. It was able to set 2 February 1919 for the election to the constituent assembly, which was to be called the Volkskammer. The USPD walked out of the provisional government on 17 January in protest against the deaths of several demonstrators shot while trying to force their way into the offices of the MSPD's Dresden newspaper. The USPD leadership sensed that it was losing its power base in Saxony, and the increasingly radical Leipzig council refused to cooperate in any way with the MSPD. Gradnauer took over leadership of the Council of the People's Deputies and filled the vacant seats with MSPD members.

=== Saxony's first Volkskammer ===
Voting for the constituent assembly that was to give Saxony a new constitution was general, direct, secret and used proportional representation. All Saxon men and women at least 21 years of age with civic rights were eligible to vote. Turnout was 74%.

1919 Volkskammer election results
Party	Votes	Percent	Seats
Majority Social Democratic Party (MSPD)	891,804	41.5	42
German Democratic Party (DDP)	490,666	22.9	22
Independent Social Democratic Party (USPD)	350,069	16.3	15
German National People's Party (DNVP)	306,718	14.4	13
German People's Party (DVP)	84,615	3.9	4
Christian People's Party (Centre Party)	21,823	1.0	1
Total	2,145,695	100	97

Immediately after the Volkskammer election, the Council of the People's Deputies began drafting a provisional constitution for Saxony. The Volkskammer approved it on 28 February but decided to delay finalization until a national constitution was put in place. The USPD and right-of-center German National People's Party (DNVP) voted against the proposed constitution, the USPD because it included no role for the workers' and soldiers' councils and the DNVP because it was "too democratic". The MSPD and USPD memberships then issued a declaration stating that "The Volkskammer declares that Saxony's policy shall be guided by the following principles: Saxony is a democratic socialist free state within the framework of the German Reich. The socialization of the economy shall be brought about in accordance with the degree of development achieved." The other parties in the Volkskammer strongly opposed the statement.

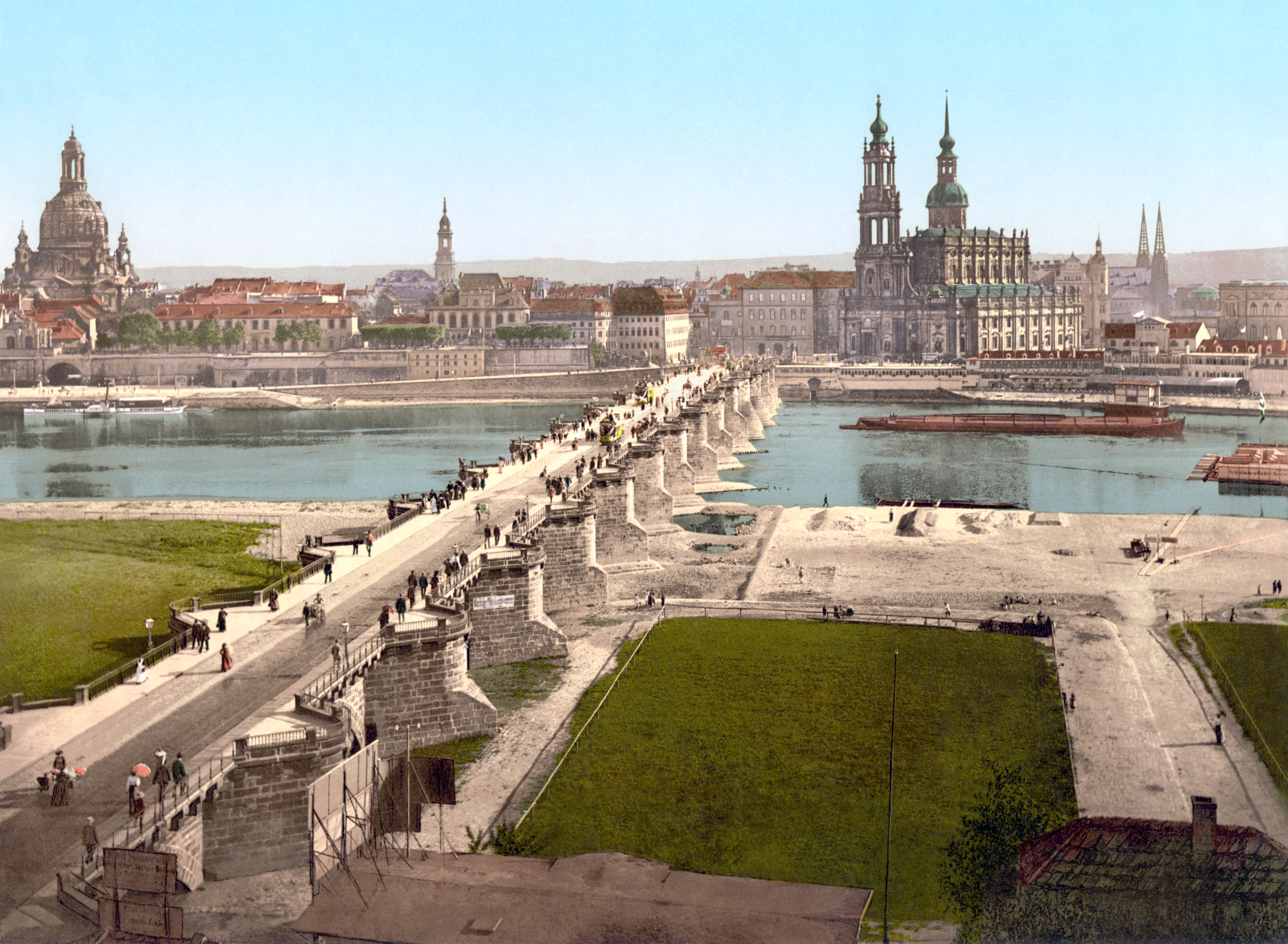
Central Dresden, capital of the Free State of Saxony, as seen in the 1890s

The MSPD was unable to build a majority coalition in the Volkskammer because it failed to come to an agreement with the USPD. On 14 March 1919 Georg Gradnauer was elected minister-president with 49 of 91 votes. The MSPD, German People's Party (DVP) and three members of the DNVP voted for him while all others withheld their votes. Gradnauer's minority cabinet lasted until October 1919 when it was able to overcome resistance within the MSPD and brought two members of the German Democratic Party (DDP) into the cabinet. Even though the Weimar Constitution came into effect on 11 August 1919, it took until 26 October 1920 for the Volkskammer to pass Saxony's new democratic constitution, which it did unanimously.

=== Saxon constitution ===
The constitution of Saxony established a single-chamber legislative body (Landtag) elected under proportional representation by all Saxon men and women with civic rights and at least 21 years of age. The Landtag elected the minister-president (required after each Landtag election), could force a minister to resign by a majority vote, and by a two-thirds majority make changes to the constitution. The government (ministry) required the confidence of the Landtag. It could veto a law sent to it by the Landtag; if it was passed a second time, the government could call for a referendum on the proposed law. The government had the power to pass emergency decrees which could not, however, violate the constitution. Saxony's constitution did not include a catalogue of basic rights or establish a supreme court. It relied instead on the provisions in the Weimar Constitution.

== Political violence ==
Saxony, with its concentration of heavy industry and a strong USPD that wanted a radical change in Saxony's political and economic structure, experienced frequent outbreaks of political violence during the early years of the Weimar Republic. In the first significant incident, on 12 April 1919, Saxon Minister of War Gustav Neuring (MSPD) was killed by a mob of wounded and disabled war veterans who had heard that their benefits were to be cut. The Saxon government declared a state of siege over all of Saxony the next day, and on the 23rd, German president Friedrich Ebert followed suit after bloody clashes erupted between paramilitary Freikorps troops and insurgents who wanted worker control of the government and an end to the state of siege. The Freikorps unit Landjägerkorps of Major General Maercker entered Leipzig on 11 May, quieted the city with no loss of life and abolished the local workers' council.

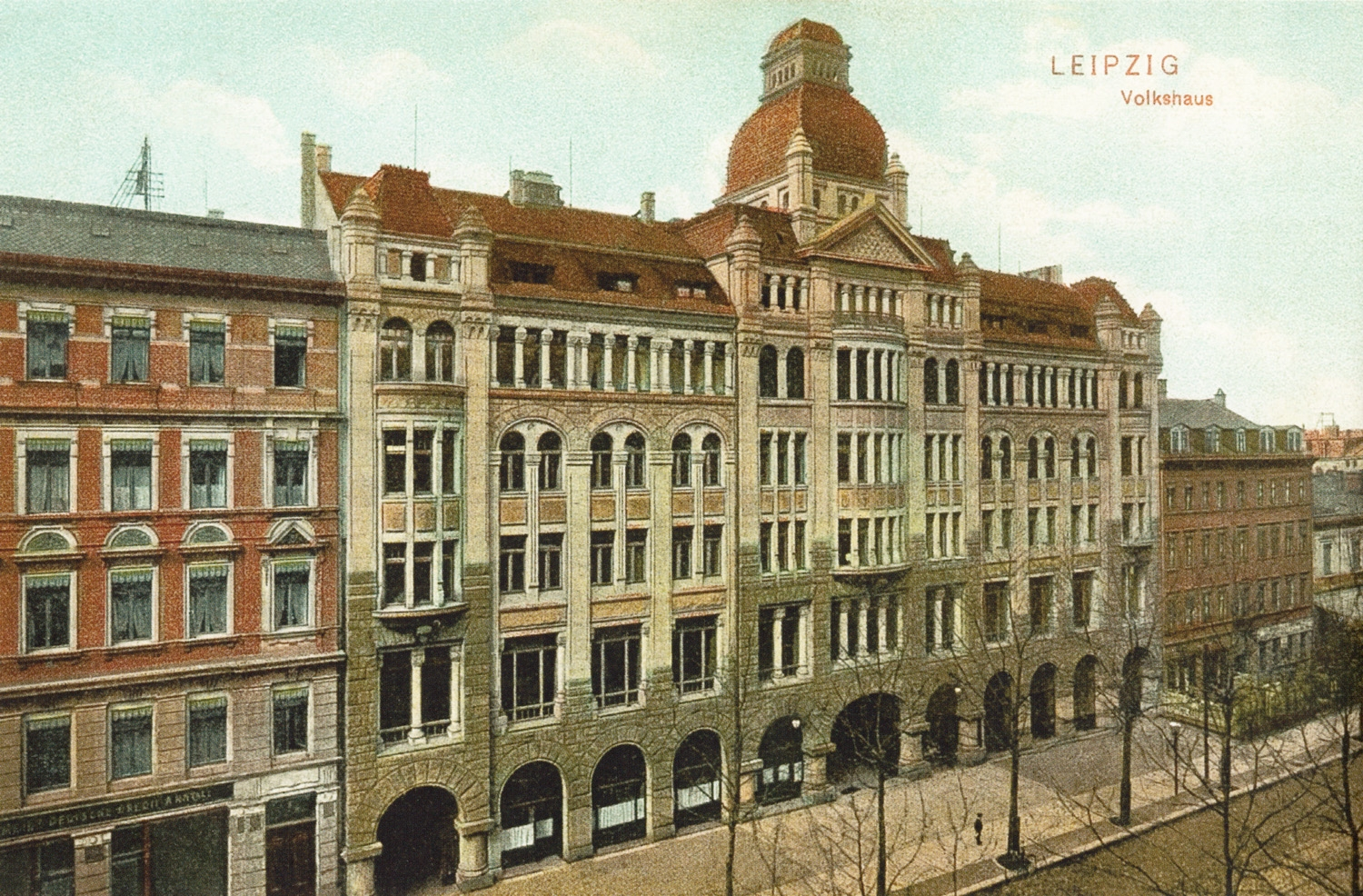
The Leipzig Volkshaus in 1913. It was the city's union headquarters building.

In Chemnitz on 8 August 1919, ongoing problems with the food supply and the continuing state of siege led to a violent confrontation between government troops and workers. Fourteen civilians and 22 soldiers died in the "Chemnitz bloodbath". Following the troops' forced withdrawal, an agreement between the contending sides put a soldiers' militia in charge of maintaining order in the city. On 19 March, the Berlin government sent 9,000 Reichswehr troops to Chemnitz. They occupied the city and regained control without additional violence.

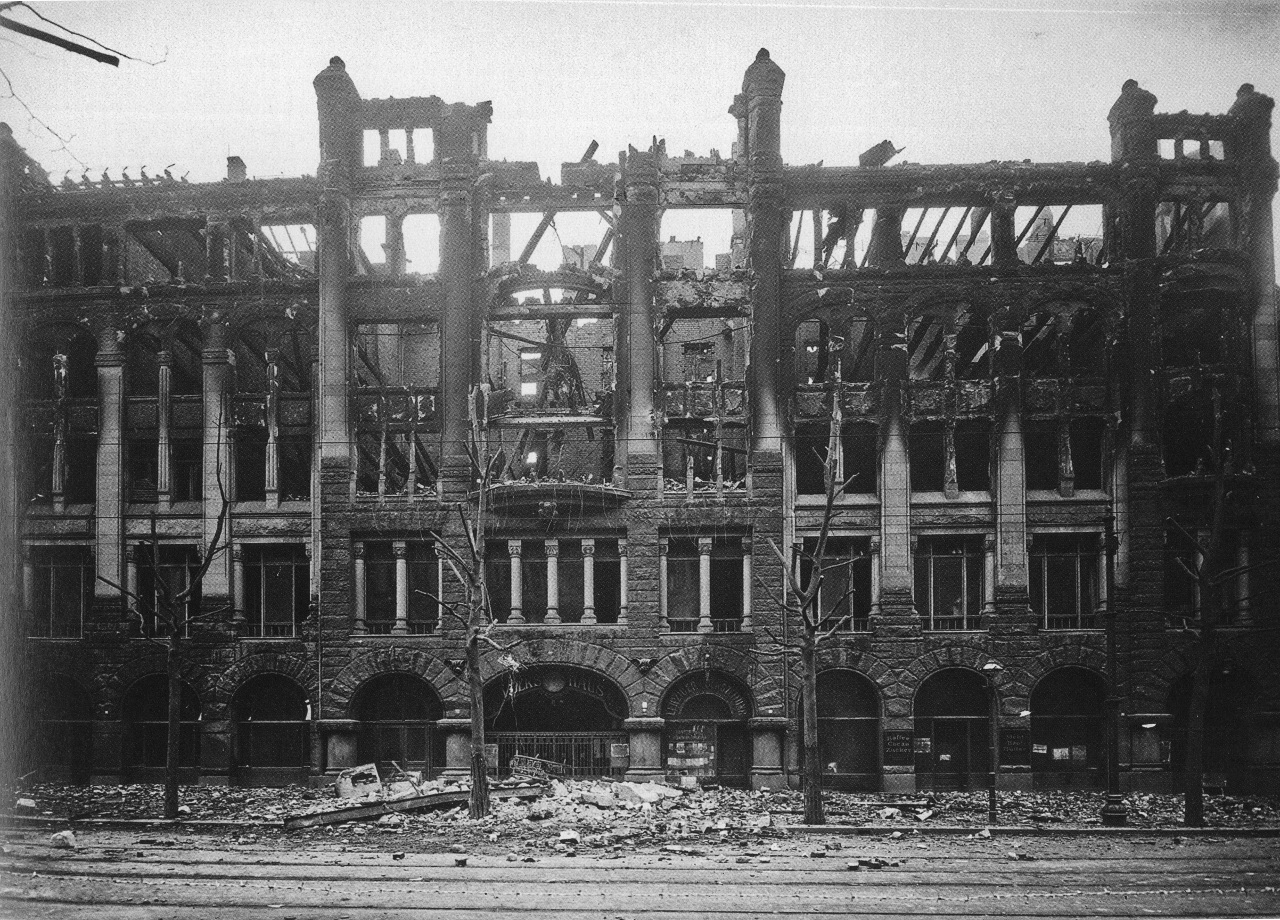
The Volkshaus after it was shelled and burned by government troops. It was quickly rebuilt by Leipzig's workers.

In mid-March 1920, right-wing opponents of the Weimar Republic instigated the Kapp Putsch in Berlin. During the demonstrations that broke out across Saxony against the putsch, Dresden saw the worst violence, with 59 protesters killed by government troops. Conflicts also broke out in Leipzig, where the local communist leadership encouraged continuation of the uprising even after the putsch had been suppressed. Government troops quickly put an end to the unrest and then burned the already damaged Leipzig union headquarters, the Volkshaus.

The situation in Saxony quieted considerably over the following three years. On 12 May 1920, the state of siege over southwest Saxony was lifted. In June, the Saxon government, led since mid-April by Wilhelm Buck of the MSPD, dissolved all of Saxony's workers' councils. In the first election to the Landtag, which replaced the Volkskammer after the new Saxon constitution was ratified in October, the ruling MSPD and DDP lost seats (15 and 14, respectively) to parties of both the Right (DVP and DNVP) and Left (KPD). Buck was re-elected minister-president and formed a minority government of the SPD and USPD with 43 of the 96 seats. There was little change with the 1922 Landtag election beyond the fact that, as at the national level, the majority of the USPD membership had merged back into the MSPD, with a small minority joining the KPD. The reunited SPD lost a total of 3 seats compared to 1920.

The first local Nazi Party (NSDAP) organization in Saxony was formed at Zwickau in October 1921. The party's public appearances and gatherings were banned in December 1922, and in March 1923 Minister-President Erich Zeigner, as his first official act, banned the party altogether.

=== Soviet takeover plans ===
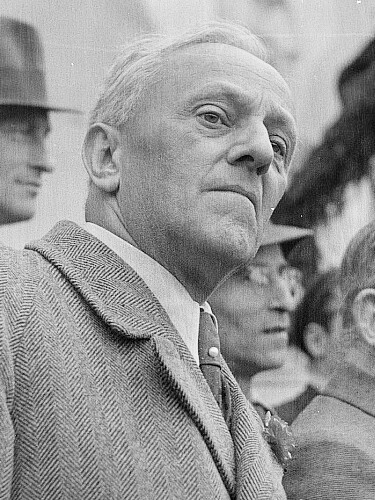
Erich Zeigner (shown here in 1948), the minister-president of Saxony who brought members of the Communist Party into his government

In 1923 the Weimar Republic was confronted with a series of major crises. In January French and Belgian troops occupied the Ruhr district after Germany was declared in default on its World War I reparations payments. The government's response, based on a call for passive resistance, ignited the hyperinflation that wiped out the savings of millions of Germans. A national state of emergency was imposed in September when a right-wing government took over in Bavaria. Fear of Bavarian extremism spreading into Saxony brought the state's SPD and KPD closer together, and under Minister-President Zeigner Saxony came to the center of the national crises in what came to be known as the German October.

Zeigner had been elected minister-president in March 1923 with the votes of the SPD and KPD after a KPD-sponsored motion of no confidence against Interior Minister Richard Lipinski passed with the support of the middle-class parties. The ministry of Wilhelm Buck resigned, and Zeigner, with the parliamentary tolerance of the KPD, took over the minority SPD government, replacing only Lipinski. Working together, the SPD and KPD in May 1923 established the Proletarian Hundreds (Proletarische Hundertschaften), paramilitary defense organizations intended to protect workers' meetings, demonstrations and property. They, along with Zeigner's often harsh criticism of the Reichswehr, led to growing tensions between the governments in Berlin and Dresden.

Without Zeigner's knowledge, Heinrich Brandler, the head of the KPD in Germany and a resident of Chemnitz, was summoned to Moscow in July to discuss using the ongoing crises to plan a communist revolution in Germany. Saxony and Thuringia were chosen to be the focal point of the uprising because of the strength of the KPD and SPD in the two states. Zeigner's eagerness to cooperate with the KPD against the political Right and to bring the KPD into his government was known to the Executive Committee of the Communist International in Moscow. Brandler returned to Germany tasked with providing the Proletarian Hundreds with weapons – he thought that 50 to 60 thousand men could be armed within a week – and with entering into negotiations to bring the KPD into the governments of Saxony and Thuringia. The appointments were to be the signal for the national uprising.

The KPD immediately began negotiating with Zeigner in Saxony and with August Frölich in Thuringia. On 10 October Zeigner replaced the SPD economics and finance ministers with KPD members (Fritz Heckert and Paul Böttcher). He also named Brandler to lead the Saxon chancellery. In a public statement, the two parties vowed to further build up the Proletarian Hundreds and if necessary to use them to protect the border with Bavaria. When three days later Lt. General Alfred Müller, the military district commander for Saxony, ordered that the Hundreds be disbanded, the Saxon government did nothing. Finance Minister Böttcher even called for a general arming of the proletarian population. In Thuringia, three KPD members joined the government on 16 October.

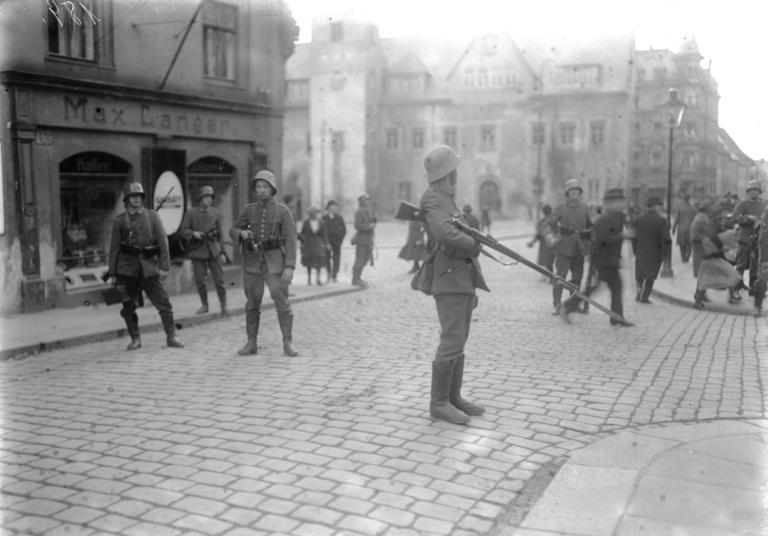
Reichswehr soldiers in Freiberg during the Reichsexekution against Saxony in October 1923

The Berlin government, like Zeigner, was unaware of Moscow's involvement in the events in Saxony and Thuringia – which were on their face fully legal and constitutional – but Reichswehr Minister Otto Gessler, fearing that a general uprising was imminent, put Saxony's police under the direct control of the Reichswehr on 16 October. On the 21st, Reichswehr troops entered Saxony's major cities on the orders of Chancellor Gustav Stresemann. The troops exchanged fire with demonstrators in Chemnitz, and in Freiberg, roughly halfway between Chemnitz and Dresden, the fighting left 23 dead and 31 wounded. The Berlin cabinet sent an ultimatum to Saxony on the 27th demanding that it remove the communist members from its government; if it did not, Gessler would appoint a Reich commissioner to take control of affairs in the state. The Zeigner government refused, saying that only the Landtag could recall ministers. Stresemann then used Article 48 of the Weimar Constitution to invoke a Reichsexekution to remove the Saxon government. He named Rudolf Heinze, a former minister of justice, as Reich commissioner. On 30 October Reichswehr troops entered the ministerial buildings in Dresden and removed the ministers. After a call for a general strike failed, Zeigner and his cabinet resigned. The Landtag then elected Alfred Fellisch minister-president to lead an SPD minority government with the tolerance of the German Democratic Party (DDP). Heinze's appointment as Reich commissioner ended on 31 October.

The KPD, and Moscow even more so, had overestimated the revolutionary fervor among workers in both Saxony and in Germany as a whole. As early as 14 October, a call by the KPD for workers to arm themselves had been ignored. At a workers' conference in Chemnitz on 21 October, the call for a general strike received all but no support. In Thuringia the government bowed to the pressure from Berlin without the need for a Reichsexekution.

== Politics 1924–1932 ==
=== SPD split ===
The political and economic situations in Saxony stabilized beginning in 1924, as they did in Germany as a whole. Unique to Saxony was the split in the SPD that took place in 1926. Alfred Fellisch's SPD government lasted only until the end of 1923, at which point it resigned after a vote of no confidence introduced by the DDP, which had initially supported it. Max Heldt of the SPD then formed a coalition of the SPD, DDP and the right-of-center German People's Party (DVP). The coalition government quickly became unpopular among the rank-and-file of the SPD, many of whom still wanted to work with the KPD. At a 1924 SPD conference, the participants voted to end the three-party cooperation. The Landtag deputies who ignored the decision – a total of 23 out of 40 – were expelled from the party beginning in November 1924. They responded by forming the Old Social Democratic Party (ASPD) on 6 June 1926. The party rapidly moved away from viewing itself as the moderate wing of the SPD and began to take a "proletarian nationalist" ideological stance that was in contrast to the "internationalist" and "anti-state" SPD. It won 4.2% of the votes in the 1926 Landtag election, giving it four seats in the assembly. The party continued to form part of the coalition government until the election of 1929. It dissolved itself in July 1932; most of its members returned to the SPD.

=== Disputed elections ===
Following the 1926 election, the first after the SPD split, Max Heldt, who had joined the ASPD, was re-elected minister-president, although not until the fifth ballot. He formed a four-party coalition government that was later expanded to six, excluding only the SPD, KPD and Nazis. The election took place under a revised electoral law meant to limit the formation of new splinter parties that had little or no chance of receiving enough votes to elect a member to the Landtag. Parties that had not been represented in the previous Landtag had to put down a deposit of 3,000 marks. The money would be refunded if the party received at least one seat in the new Landtag; if not, it would be forfeit to the state. On 22 March 1929 the State Court for the German Reich declared the law unconstitutional and required that the Landtag be dissolved and a new election held.

The resulting May 1929 election was notable for the Nazi Party's early strong showing and because a court again declared the election invalid. The SPD brought a successful complaint saying that the ASPD rather than the SPD had been listed first on the ballot. Before the legal challenge, Wilhelm Bünger of the DVP had replaced Heldt as minister-president, helped in part by the votes of the Nazi delegates. Bünger's four-party center-right government lasted only until February 1930 when it fell to a vote of no confidence backed by, among others, the Nazis, SPD and KPD. Walther Schieck of the DVP became the new minister-president, but his cabinet resigned after less than a week following a vote of no confidence from the Nazis, SPD and KPD. The Landtag voted to dissolve itself, and a new election was held on 22 June 1930. In it the Nazis gained 9 seats, primarily at the expense of the middle-class parties. Because no agreement could be reached to form a new government, Schieck's ministry remained in power in an acting capacity until 10 March 1933, after the Nazi takeover of the German government. The deadlock in the Landtag after the 1930 election marked the end of true parliamentary democracy in Saxony.

Landtag of Saxony – seats by party
Party	1919	1920	1922	1926	1929	1930	1933
Centre Party (Z)	1	1	–	–	–		1
Saxon Peasants					5	5	
Christian Social People's Service (CSVd)						2	1
Communist Party (KPD)		6	10	14	12	13	[14] (Note: The Nazi government banned the KPD. The 14 representatives elected were not seated.)
Economic Party (WP)		–	–	10	11	10	
German Democratic Party (DDP)	22	8	8	5	4	3	1
German National People's Party (DNVP)	13	20	19	14	8	5	6
German People's Party (DVP)	4	18	19	12	13	8	2
Independent Social Democratic Party (USPD)	15	16					
Nazi Party (NSDAP)				2	5	14	38
Old Social Democratic Party (ASPD)				4	2	–	
People's Justice Party (Vrp)				4	3	2	
Social Democratic Party (SPD)	42	27	40	31	33	32	22
Others			–	–	–	2	–
Turnout	74%	70%	82%	71%	78%	74%	92%

== End of the Saxon republic ==
=== Great Depression ===
Germany's fragile post-war economy had been sustained in large part by foreign loans under two international agreements which attempted to help Germany pay its World War I reparations obligations. After the New York stock market crash of October 1929, American banks began withdrawing their lines of credit to German companies. Unemployment grew dramatically as a result, rising to six million in early 1933. The Great Depression hit Saxony's export-reliant economy particularly hard and led to unemployment above the German average. With the centrist parties weak and fragmented in the face of Saxony's traditionally strong Left, many from the middle class turned to the Nazis under the effects of the depression.

=== Nazi takeover ===
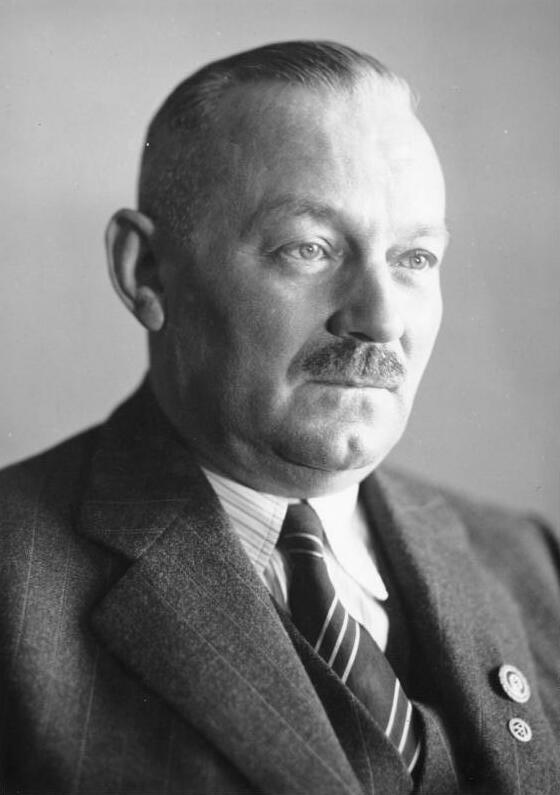
Manfred Freiherr von Killinger, Saxony's first Nazi minister-president

Adolf Hitler was appointed chancellor of Germany on 30 January 1933. Both the Nazi Party and, under its pressure, the Saxon government quickly began to move against the KPD and SPD, arresting communists and banning SPD newspapers. in Saxony, the SPD and KPD share of the vote in the 5 March 1933 Reichstag election was nevertheless the highest in Germany at 42.7%, with the Leipzig and Dresden-Bautzen electoral districts topping all others nationwide. On 10 March Manfred Freiherr von Killinger, as authorized by German Interior Minister Wilhelm Frick, forced out the Schieck cabinet and took over the government of Saxony.

The first Nazi "synchronization" (Gleichschaltung) law of 31 March 1933 dissolved the Landtag and reconstituted it based on the results of the 5 March Reichstag election. Because the 14 representatives of the KPD, which had won 16.5% of the vote for the Reichstag, were not allowed to take their seats in the reconstituted Landtag, the Nazis, with 45% of Saxony's Reichstag vote and 38 seats, were able to claim an absolute majority (38 of 71 seats instead of 38 of 85). On 5 May, based on the second synchronization law, Martin Mutschmann became Reich governor (Reichsstatthalter) of Saxony. Killinger introduced an all-Nazi cabinet the following day with himself as minister-president. The Landtag passed an enabling act on 23 May which gave

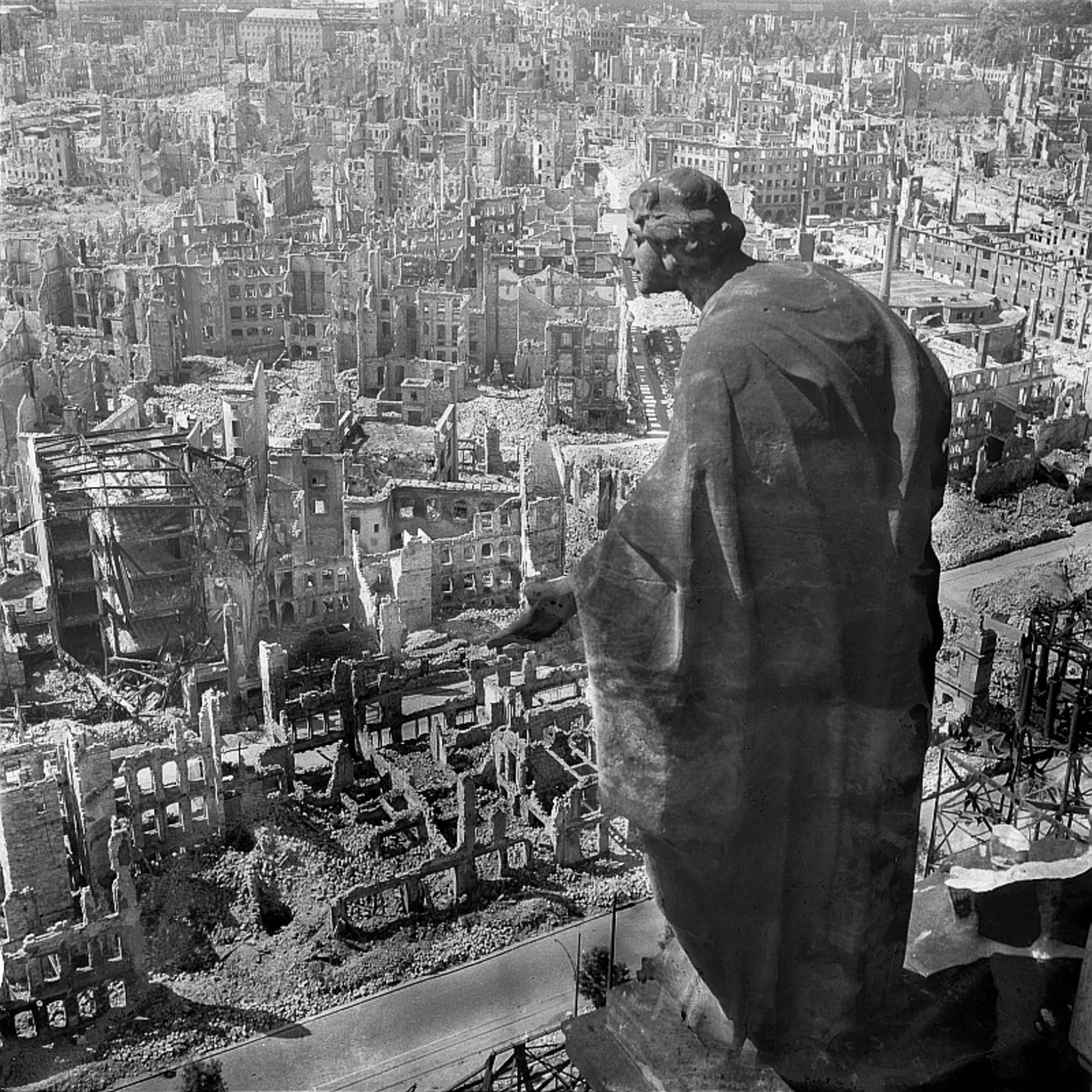
View of Dresden from the tower of its city hall after the 1945 bombing

Killinger's cabinet the authority to make and enforce laws without the involvement of the Landtag. Only the six deputies of the SPD who remained voted against it. The final sitting of the Nazi-dominated Landtag took place on 22 August 1933.

=== Aftermath ===
All of Saxony's major cities suffered heavy damage from Allied bombings during World War II. Leipzig lost 40% of its housing, Chemnitz 25% along with 80% of the city center, and the bombing of Dresden in February 1945 caused an estimated 25,000 deaths and destroyed the culturally rich core of the city. After the war, Saxony became part of the Soviet occupation zone and in 1949 of the German Democratic Republic (East Germany). Saxony disappeared as a political entity in 1952 when the East German government abolished its five constituent states. It was reborn, again as the Free State of Saxony, in October 1990 as part of the reunified Germany.

== See also ==
- States of the Weimar Republic
- Province of Saxony
