= Hermann Fleissner =

German politician (1865–1939)

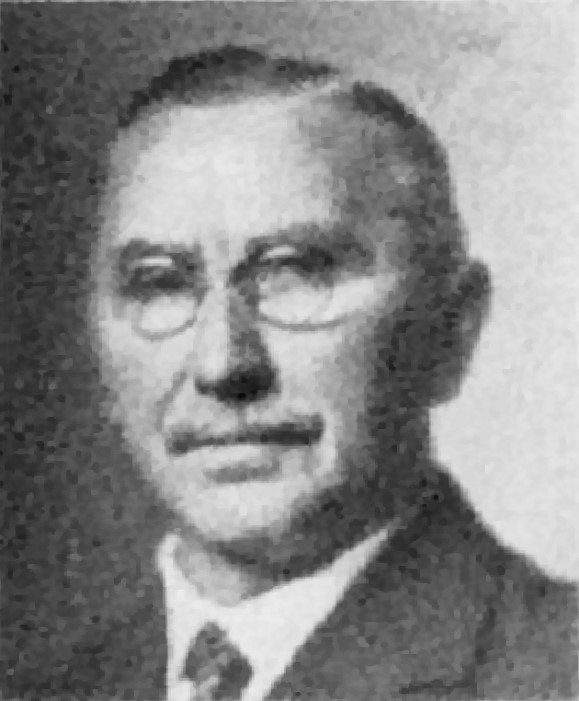
A portrait of Hermann Fleissner

Hermann Fleissner (16 June 1865, Dresden – 20 April 1939, Berlin) was a German politician of the SPD and, from 1917 to 1922, the USPD. He sat in the Saxon Landtag and later the Saxon People's Chamber from 1909 to 1920, was a member of the Reichstag from 1920 to 1933, and served as Saxony's minister for education (later renamed minister for popular education) from 1920 to 1924.

== Before the First World War ==
After the Volksschule, Fleissner undertook an apprenticeship as a carpenter. He worked as a journeyman until 1895 and then for a short time as an independent carpenter in Pirna. In 1884, Fleissner joined the SPD, and in 1895 he became a member of the Woodworkers' Association. From 1885 to 1898 he was chairman of the local SPD in Pirna. From 1897, with interruptions, until 1917 Fleissner worked first as a reporter for Social Democratic newspapers and later as an editor of the Dresdner Volkszeitung. From 1913 to 1917, Fleissner was a member of the central party committee of the SPD and chairman of the Dresden party organisation. He belonged to the left wing of the party before the war.

Between 1900 and 1903, Fleissner was a councillor in Löbtau, and following its incorporation into Dresden, a city councillor there from 1905 to 1909. Under the Kingdom of Saxony he sat, as deputy for the 16th rural constituency, in the Second Chamber of the Saxon Landtag from 1909 to 1918. Before the First World War he stood unsuccessfully for the Reichstag in 1907.

== During the First World War and the German Revolution ==
With the founding of the USPD in 1917, Fleissner switched to that party and served as its Dresden chairman until 1921. He also sat temporarily on the party's central council and worked as an editor of the party press (Unabhängige Volkszeitung). He represented Dresden on the USPD's Control Committee.

During the November Revolution, Fleissner declared the Republic of Saxony on 10 November 1918 at the Circus Sarrasani in Dresden. He then became a member of Saxony's Council of the People's Deputies and minister for military affairs, the renamed former war ministry. He held this post until the USPD withdrew its members from the government on 16 January 1919. In February of that year he was elected to the Saxon People's Chamber as a USPD deputy.

In 1920 Fleissner belonged to the minority of USPD delegates who, at the party's extraordinary congress in Halle, rejected the party's affiliation with the Communist International. He accordingly did not join the merger of the USPD's left wing with the KPD.

When Minister-President Wilhelm Buck of the majority SPD brought the USPD back into government in December 1920, he appointed Fleissner minister of state for education. Fleissner rejoined the reunified SPD in 1922 along with the majority of the rump USPD. During Erich Zeigner's government, his post was renamed minister for popular education in 1923; he retained it, through the brief SPD–KPD coalition of autumn 1923 that was dissolved by federal execution, until the change of government in January 1924. In 1927 Fleissner stood unsuccessfully in the Saxon Landtag against Max Heldt of the breakaway Old Social Democratic Party for the post of Saxon minister-president.

Fleissner sat in the Reichstag from 1920, representing the Dresden-Bautzen constituency in every one of the Weimar Republic's eight electoral periods until 1933. In the party's internal debate over construction of Armoured Ship A, Fleissner opposed the party leadership and, with other members of the left wing, voted against a defence-policy motion at the 1929 party congress. Two years later he again belonged to the internal opposition, and his candidacy for the party executive failed, likely as a result. In 1930 he failed at the state party congress in his bid to become the SPD's candidate for Saxon minister-president. Reflecting his left-wing position, he became a contributor to the Marxistische Tribüne in 1931.

Fleissner also worked as a freelance writer. During the Nazi era he was imprisoned for several months.
