= Erich Koch-Weser =

German politician (1875–1944)

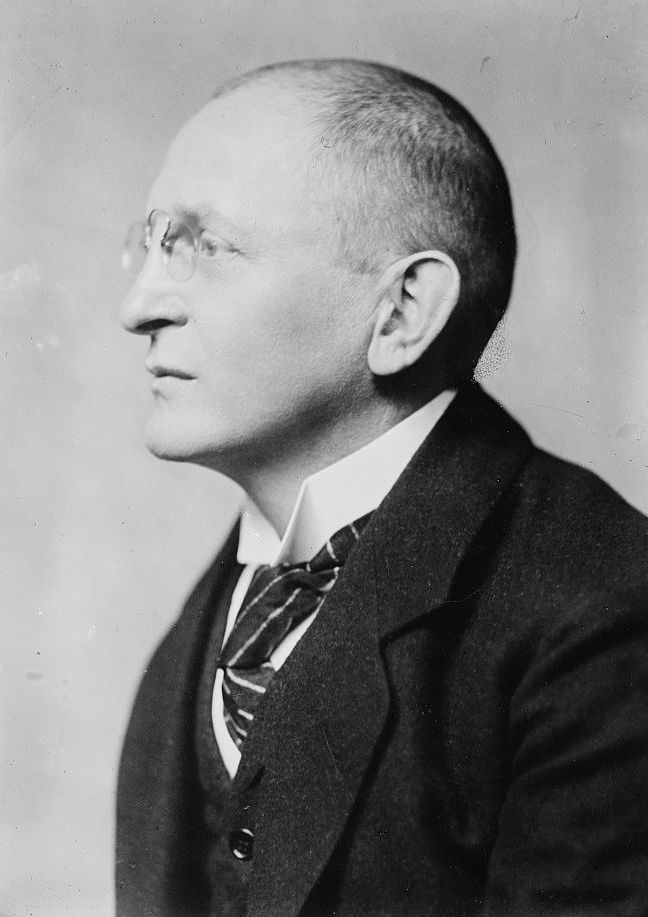
- Koch-Weser circa 1920

Vice-Chancellor of Germany
- In office 27 March 1920 – 21 June 1920
- Chancellor: Hermann Müller
- Preceded by: Eugen Schiffer
- Succeeded by: Rudolf Heinze

Reich Minister of Justice
- In office 28 June 1928 – 13 April 1929
- Chancellor: Hermann Müller
- Preceded by: Oskar Hergt
- Succeeded by: Theodor von Guérard

Reich Minister of the Interior
- In office 3 October 1919 – 10 May 1921
- Chancellor: Constantin Fehrenbach; Hermann Müller; Gustav Bauer
- Preceded by: Eduard David
- Succeeded by: Georg Gradnauer

Member of the Reichstag (Weimar Republic)
- In office 1920–1930
- Constituency: National list (1930); Berlin (1924–1930); Weser-Ems (1920–1924)

Member of the Weimar National Assembly
- In office 6 February 1919 – 21 May 1920
- Constituency: Hesse-Nassau

Personal details
- Born: Erich Koch; 26 February 1875 Bremerhaven, Bremen, German Empire
- Died: 19 October 1944 (aged 69) Rolândia, Paraná, Brazil
- Party: German State Party
- Other political affiliations: German Democratic Party (1918–1930)

Erich Koch-Weser (born Erich Koch; 26 February 1875 – 19 October 1944) was a German lawyer and liberal politician. One of the founders (1918) and later chairman (1924–1930) of the liberal German Democratic Party, he served as minister of the Interior (1919–1921), vice-chancellor of Germany (1920) and minister of Justice (1928–1929).

== Early life ==
Erich Koch was born on 26 February 1875 in Bremerhaven as the son of Dr. Anton Koch (1838–76), a Protestant headmaster of a higher girls' school, and his wife Minna (1841–1930, née Lewenstein), the daughter of a Jewish merchant from Burhave.

Erich Koch studied law and economics at Lausanne, Bonn, Berlin and at the Ludwig-Maximilians-Universität München (LMU) in Munich from 1893 to 1897 where he finished with a Dr.jur.

Erich Koch was married twice. In 1903, he married Bertha (1880–1923, née Fortmann). In 1925, he married Irma (1897–1970, née von Blanquet). He had four sons and one daughters from his first marriage and two sons from his second marriage.

== Political career ==
In 1901, he became Mayor of Delmenhorst, in 1909 Stadtdirektor in Bremerhaven and from 1913 to 1919 was Mayor of Kassel. He belonged to the left wing of the National Liberal Party, was an admirer of Friedrich Naumann and an advocate of abolishing the Prussian Dreiklassenwahlrecht. He also served as a member of the Upper chamber of the Prussian diet.

In November 1918, Koch was a founder-member of the German Democratic Party (DDP). In January 1919, he was elected to the Weimar National Assembly for the DDP and achieved a powerful position within the party's parliamentary group.

When the DDP rejoined the government of Gustav Bauer (SPD) in October 1919, Koch became Minister of the Interior (Reichsinnenminister). He kept that office under Chancellors Hermann Müller (SPD) and Constantin Fehrenbach (Zentrum). Under Müller, Koch was also Vice-Chancellor. He left the government on 4 May 1921 and worked as an attorney in Berlin.

Koch was a member of the Reichstag from 1920 to 1930. In early 1924, Carl Wilhelm Petersen resigned as chairman of the DDP, resulting in a leadership election which saw Koch prevail over Otto Gessler and Hermann Hummel to assume the party chairmanship.

Although a member of the DDP's right wing on many issues, in the fall of 1924, Koch refused to enter a coalition with the nationalist DNVP. The first government of Hans Luther which followed collapsed over the approval of the Locarno Treaties in late 1925. On the instructions of Reich President Paul von Hindenburg, Koch was prompted to negotiate the formation of a "Grand Coalition" of the SPD and DVP. These efforts would be rejected by the Social Democrats, who demanded an increase in unemployment benefits. Koch would resign the mandate to form a government, and the DDP was compelled to join a minority government under the leadership of Luther.

In 1927, he would change his surname to Koch-Weser (after the river Weser) to distinguish himself from other members of the Reichstag who shared his surname, and in reference to his former constituency.

In 1928, Koch-Weser was appointed Minister of Justice in the new government of Hermann Müller. He attempted a fundamental reform of criminal law, but as the Zentrum demanded the Justice department, Koch-Weser lost his position in April 1929.

In the summer of 1930, Koch-Weser merged the DDP with Artur Mahraun's Young German Order into the Deutsche Staatspartei, trying to gather what remained of the pro-republican and Protestant middle-class in Germany into a single political party. After the poor performance of his new party in the September 1930 election, Koch-Weser resigned from the Reichstag and from the leadership of the party.

== Later life ==
Koch-Weser then left politics and worked as a lawyer in Berlin. After the Nazis seized power, they banned him from practicing law in the fall of 1933. He emigrated to Brazil where he bought a large coffee plantation called Fazenda Janeta near Rolândia in the state of Paraná. Koch-Weser died at Fazenda Janeta on 19 (or 20) October 1944.

Erich Koch-Weser was the grandfather of former World Bank executive and German politician Caio Koch-Weser. He became the first ever honorary citizen of Delmenhorst in 1928.

== Bibliography ==
- Die Umgestaltung der beiden Häuser des Landtags, 1918
- Einheitsstaat und Selbstverwaltung, 1928
- Deutschlands Außenpolitik in der Nachkriegszeit 1919–29, 1929 (Engl.: Germany in the Post-War World, 1930)
- Und dennoch aufwärts!, 1933
- Hitler and beyond, A German Testament, 1945.

Political offices
Preceded by Eduard David	Federal Minister of the Interior of Germany; 1919–1921	Succeeded by Georg Gradnauer
Preceded by Eugen Schiffer	Vice Chancellor of Germany; 1920	Succeeded by Rudolf Heinze
Preceded by Oskar Hergt	Federal Minister of Justice of Germany; 1928–1929	Succeeded by Theodor von Guérard
