= Old Social Democratic Party of Germany =

Defunct political party in Weimar Germany

Old Social Democratic Party of Germany Alte Sozialdemokratische Partei Deutschlands
- Leader: Wilhelm Buck
- Founded: 6 June 1926; 100 years ago
- Dissolved: July 1, 1932; 94 years ago
- Split from: Social Democratic Party of Germany
- Merged into: Social Democratic Party of Germany
- Newspaper: Der Volkstaat
- Ideology: Social democracy German nationalism Pro-Grand Coalition; Factions: National Bolshevism; Volksgemeinschaft
- Political position: Centre-left
- Colours: Red

The Old Social Democratic Party of Germany (German: Alte Sozialdemokratische Partei Deutschlands, ASPD), originally known as the Old Social Democratic Party of Saxony (German: Alte Sozialdemokratische Partei Sachsens) until 1927, was a political party in Germany. The party was a splinter group of the Social Democratic Party of Germany (SPD) in Saxony, and had nationalist tendencies. Whilst the party failed to become a mass party, it played a significant role in state politics in Saxony during the latter half of the 1920s. A leader of the party, Max Heldt, served as Minister-President of Saxony 1926–1929. Wilhelm Buck was the chairman of the party.

== Background ==
During the Weimar Republic, the Social Democratic Party had an uneasy relationship with nationalism. Classical Marxism espoused anti-nationalism and internationalism and the SPD's ideas on nationalism and its relationship to class remained vague as the party juggled internationalist and nationalist priorities. The moderate Reformist faction called on the party to abandon internationalism and worker oriented politics and to become a national peoples party which would represent the whole the German people while the Leftist faction called on the party to further embrace internationalism and worker oriented politics.

The Saxon SPD (SSPD) was one of the most powerful, and most politically isolated, state SPD branches in the whole of Germany. With 8% of the German population, Saxony held 16% of all SPD members; while SPD affiliated co-operatives, unions, night schools, and sports clubs were a part of everyday life for SPD voters. The SSPD was dominated by the left wing faction of the party, which meant the party did not enter coalitions with moderates bourgeois parties and instead preferred co-operation with the KPD. The SSPD’s beliefs, alongside political conflicts dating back to the German Empire, and the lack of the mediating Zentrum party in the state made co-operation between moderates and the SSPD very difficult. The SSPD would form a minority KPD tolerated before government before eventually entering a coalition with the KPD, but this was dissolved via a highly controversial Reichsexekution.

== The split ==
In October 1923 facing pressure from the much more moderate national SPD, the SSPD split over whether to enter a grand coalition with the left-liberal DDP, and classical liberal DVP. The majority of party members opposed the grand coalition but by contrast the majority of the SSPD Landtag delegation supported it (23 supported 17 opposed). At the 1924 SSPD party congress it was decided that the party would not join a Grand Coalition, primarily due to opposition to working with the DVP. The 23 decided to join a grand coalition despite both the explicit opposition of the SSPD executive. This debate between the factions of the SSPD became known as the Sachsenkonflikt. The national SPD was constantly dealing with this conflict and made several attempts to resolve it. At the 1925 SPD Party Congress, Rudolf Breitscheid spoke in favor of the 23 arguing that excessive rigidity and hostility to the state would be detrimental to the party, Otto Wels later implied the party executive supported the ASPD, and the moderate reformists within the SPD always supported the ASPD. Despite numerous repeated attempts the party failed the resolve the Sachsenkonflikt. In early 1926, at the urging of local party members to SSPD executive called a vote of no confidence against the new government, which was opposed by all 23 moderates, who were promptly expelled from the party. Despite the split, for the time being the Reichsbanner still allowed ASPD members within its ranks.

In April 1926 the party issued its first ideological statement, in which it expressed support for "positive work within the state" while rejecting the "useless position of opposition". They spoke out strongly in support of the Weimar Republic, while supporting figures such as Friedrich Ebert and Gustav Noske who the SSPD had condemned as to moderate and hoping to eventually rejoin the national SPD. Despite this seemingly moderate stance behind the scenes a nationalist force was brewing within the party.

== Ideological shift ==
In July 1926 founding member of the party Eva Büttner invited Ernst Niekisch to become editor of the party newspaper Der Volkstaat, the logic behind the decision remains unclear but in all likelihood the party wanted to ensure it had a place within the Saxon press and desired separate itself from the SSPD. Niekisch held a syncretic mix of nationalist and socialist views which made him incompatible with both the national SPD and the German Right, with him having previously been an SPD member and a leader in the SPD's youth branch. Niekisch was vocal in his views, calling for an ideological mix of republicanism, socialism, and German Nationalism. While a speech by Niekisch promoting his views was vocally supported by several ASPD politicians such as Eva Büttner and Wilhelm Buck, the party as a whole had a more mixed reaction to his views.

In the run-up to the 1926 Saxony Landtag election the party campaigned across the state and achieved a good deal of support among trade unionists, particularly in the East where moderate socialists had always been stronger. Despite these efforts the party failed dramatically, winning less than 100,000 votes and four seats. Despite this the party's four seats still made it kingmaker in any potential coalition government. The resency of the Sachsenkonlikt made any coalition with the SPD and KPD impossible, so the party opted to participate in a bourgeois coalition with the DDP, DVP, WP, VRP, and DNVP in exchange ASPD leader Max Heldt remained as Minister-president. The ASPD justified this extremely broad coalition by arguing that by serving the government they could serve their voters better than if they stayed in opposition, while also arguing that this coalition would serve to unite the German people claiming the SSPD's class and politically rigidity only harmed and divided the Saxon people.

In the aftermath of the 1926 election the ASPD began a sizable shift in its rhetoric, shifting to focus more on nationalist and anti-internationalist themes. It was no longer was it the party of moderate socialism, it was the party of "proletarian nationalism" reconciling center-left social reform with right-wing nationalism in an idea later referred to as National Bolshevism. Niekisch had become the party's de facto leader with his influence pervading every level of party thinking. Though some, especially Wilhelm Buck and Karl Bethke remained committed to the old ideas while Max Heldt opportunistically began supporting the new nationalist direction. Under the direction of Niekisch the party began attempting to expand its reach outside of Saxony. The party was joined by August Winnig (former president of East Prussia), who had been expelled from the SPD for involvement in the Kapp Putsch. Through the recruitment of Winnig, the party hoped to expand its influence to other parts of Germany. The party sought to identify itself with the tradition of Lassalleanism, which it claimed was socialism of German trade unionists; as opposed to the Marxism of the SPD which it claimed was the socialism of foreigners and intellectuals. Embracing the stab-in-the-back myth, the nationalists argued that SPD had been divided between a true German wing, which supported the Burgfriedenspolitik and a foreign wing which had stabbed Germany in the back during World War 1 and had taken over the SPD as a whole. The party also embraced Völkism and sought the creation of a Volksgemeinschaft or unity of the German Völk. The party said that the most pressing need for the German working class was the resolution of the national question. Niekisch wrote that Germany had become the victim of exploitation by international capitalism via things such as war reparations, and that the SPD was actively complicit and responsible for this exploitation. What differentiates the ASPD from the rest of the German Right was its focus on the workers and their rejection of bourgeois nationalism for their own proletarian nationalism, with moderate socialist economic elements still remaining within the party platform.

The Saxon left had an extremely poor relationship with the ASPD, the SSPD's primary target in their election campaigning had been the ASPD accusing them often of "gross treachery". The party was labelled as 'social fascist' by the communist press. Possibly, this was the first time this term was used in communist discourse. In the summer of 1926 SSPD organization expelled members of the ASPD, In the fall of 1927 the paramilitary organization Reichsbanner Schwarz-Rot-Gold expelled all members belonging to the Old Social Democratic Party, accusing the party of seeking alliances with fascists. At this stage the party began distancing itself from its bourgeois coalition partners, criticizing them from a nationalist angle. It began seeking cooperation with nationalist groups, such as Der Stahlhelm and Junge Deutsche Orden. The German Right was ecstatic at the nationalist shift with many praising the ASPD for giving workers a nationalist alternative to Marxism, and the Stalhelm leader in Braunschweig defecting to the party. The NSDAP newspaper Völkischer Beobachter began writing positively about the positions of the Old Social Democratic Party. However, Völkischer Beobachter expressed concerns regarding the name of the party (which sought to identify with the Marxist roots of the SPD) and the position of the Old Social Democratic Party towards the Jewish population (which the National Socialists found too vague).

The reasons for this ideological shift are hard to determine but some reasons can be established. Following the ASPD's total rejection by the rest of the Saxon left the party likely sought to separate itself from the Saxon left, using nationalism to do so. The party also was likely influenced rightwards by its coalition partners, and seeing the success of the Saxon right may have been convinced of the rallying power of nationalism.

== Decline ==
The new, 'national revolutionary' profile proved to be a non-starter for the electoral work of the party. For example, Niekisch's national revolutionary line had alienated the trade unionists in the textile industry, who had initially supported the party. At the 1927 ASPD party congress Niekisch warned that the Saxon workers were not supportive of the party's hyper-governmental strategy and needed to be "educated". By 1928 though the party was losing what influence it had among the workers, union leaders particularly textile union leaders who had supported the governmental strategy still left the party in protest of the National Bolshevik takeover. While party meetings in Berlin were violently disrupted by the Reichsbanner.

The party failed dramatically in the 1928 Reichstag election, receiving a minuscule 65,000 votes, 35,000 in Saxony 30,000 in the rest of Germany. The results proved a deathblow to Niekisch's influence and ideology within the party. On October 12 the party published a revised party program which returned to previous ideology of moderate socialism and purged more extreme ideas, while the party simultaneously began distancing itself from right-wing paramilitaries. Niekisch and Winnig both disapproved of these changed and resigned their membership, while other members who had joined the party due to the proletarian nationalism like Richard Schapke and Eugen Mossakowsky, joined the Nazis. With the departure of the nationalists the ASPD's relationship with the German Right was ruined. These changes failed to help the party and its electoral decline continued, the party won only 2 seats in the 1929 Saxon Landtag election and due to the demands of the Nazis was excluded from the new government, though this was soon reversed and Georg Eisner was reinstated as Minister of Employment and Welfare.

The party failed to win any seat in the 1930 Saxony Landtag election, and in July 1932 what remained of the party rejoined the SPD.
