= Rudolf Heinze =

German jurist and politician (1865–1928)

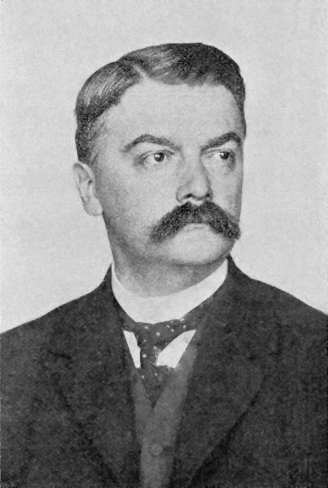

Vice-Chancellor of Germany
- In office 25 June 1920 – 10 May 1921
- Chancellor: Constantin Fehrenbach
- Preceded by: Erich Koch-Weser (1920)
- Succeeded by: Gustav Bauer

Minister-President of Saxony
- In office 29 October 1923 – 31 October 1923
- Preceded by: Erich Zeigner
- Succeeded by: Alfred Fellisch
- In office 26 October 1918 – 13 November 1918
- Monarch: Frederick Augustus III
- Preceded by: Heinrich Gustav Beck
- Succeeded by: Richard Lipinski

Reich Minister of Justice
- In office 22 November 1922 – 12 August 1923
- Chancellor: Wilhelm Cuno
- Preceded by: Gustav Radbruch
- Succeeded by: Gustav Radbruch
- In office 25 June 1920 – 10 May 1921
- Chancellor: Constantin Fehrenbach
- Preceded by: Andreas Blunck
- Succeeded by: Eugen Schiffer

Member of the Reichstag (Weimar Republic)
- In office 1920–1924
- Constituency: Dresden-Bautzen

(German Empire)
- In office 1907–1912
- Constituency: Saxony

Member of the Weimar National Assembly
- In office 6 February 1919 – 21 May 1920
- Constituency: Dresden-Bautzen

Personal details
- Born: Karl Rudolf Heinze; 22 July 1865 Oldenburg, Germany
- Died: 26 May 1928 (aged 62) Dresden, Germany
- Party: German People's Party

Karl Rudolf Heinze (22 July 1865 – 26 May 1928) was a German jurist and politician. During the Weimar Republic, as a member of the right-of-centre German People's Party (DVP) he was vice-chancellor of Germany and minister of Justice in 1920/21 in the cabinet of Constantin Fehrenbach and from 1922 to 1923 again minister of Justice under Wilhelm Cuno.

== Early life ==
Karl Rudolf Heinze was born on 22 July 1865 in Oldenburg in what was then the Grand Duchy of Oldenburg as the son of Max Heinze, a professor of the history of philosophy. He attended the Gymnasium in Basel and Leipzig from 1874 to 1881. Following the Abitur he studied at Tübingen, Heidelberg, Berlin and Leipzig, where he was awarded the doctor juris in 1887. After voluntarily serving for one year in the military in 1888, Heinze worked from 1898 to 1912 in the judicial service of Saxony, at the end in the position of Landgerichtsdirektor. He then joined the Reichsanwaltschaft, the prosecution at the Reichsgericht in Leipzig. In 1914, he became a Reichsgerichtsrat.

In 1900, Heinze married Anna (1863–1948) née Hotop. They had three sons and a daughter.

== Political career ==
=== Empire ===
Heinze began his political career in 1899, when he became a Stadtverordneter (member of the city council) at Leipzig. From 1903 he was an unsalaried Stadtrat (member of the city government) in Dresden. From 1907 to 1912, he held a seat in the Reichstag for the National Liberal Party where he was a member of the party's right wing. In 1915–16, Heinze was a member of the Landtag (diet) of the Kingdom of Saxony. On account of personal contacts with Turkey, Heinze was then appointed Undersecretary of State at the Ministry of Justice of the Ottoman Empire in Constantinople. He remained there until the summer of 1918.

From July to November 1918, Heinze was Minister of Justice of the Kingdom of Saxony and briefly the last Ministerpräsident of the King of Saxony.

=== Weimar Republic ===
In the German Revolution of 1918-19 Heinze was instrumental in founding the Deutsche Volkspartei (DVP). He was a leading member of the DVP first in the Weimar National Assembly (1919/20) and then of the Reichstag (1920–24).

In June 1919, Heinze played a key role in making possible a compromise between the opposition and the government on the Treaty of Versailles, paving the way to its acceptance by the National Assembly.

In June 1920, he tried unsuccessfully to form a new government, after the Reichstag elections had caused the resignation of the previous government of Hermann Müller. However, the Social Democratic Party of Germany (SPD) refused to work with the DVP, whose foreign policy stance the Social Democrats considered too nationalistic. When Constantin Fehrenbach became Chancellor, Heinze became Vice-Chancellor and Minister of Justice in his cabinet. The Fehrenbach cabinet resigned in May 1921.

From November 1922 to August 1923, Heinze was once again Vice-Chancellor and Minister of Justice in the cabinet of Wilhelm Cuno. Heinze organized supplies for the population of the Ruhr area during the occupation by French and Belgian troops. The passive resistance against the occupiers resulted in economic collapse and hyper inflation in Germany, leading to the resignation of the Cuno cabinet in August 1923.

In October 1923, the Ministerpräsident of the Free State of Saxony, Erich Zeigner refused to disband the Proletarische Hundertschaften (an armed militia of communist workers) and to dismiss the communist members of his cabinet. Reichswehrminister Otto Gessler ordered the Reichswehr into Saxony and on 28. October president Friedrich Ebert, making use of Article 48 of the Weimar Constitution, dismissed Zeigner. Chancellor Gustav Stresemann (DVP) appointed Heinze Reichskommissar, effectively Zeigner's successor. Heinze attempted to install a bourgeois government but was forestalled by the Saxony diet, which on 31 October elected Alfred Fellisch (SPD) as Ministerpräsident and head of a social-democratic cabinet.

From 1924 to 1926, Heinze lived secludedly in Dresden. In 1926/27, as the suggestion of the Turkish government, Heinze chaired the Konsularobergericht (a disciplinary court for foreign service) in Egypt. He died on 26 May 1928 in Dresden.

Political offices
Preceded by Heinrich Gustav Beck	Minister-President of Saxony; 1918	Succeeded by Richard Lipinski
Preceded by Erich Zeigner	Minister-President of Saxony; 1923	Succeeded by Alfred Karl Fellisch
Preceded by Erich Koch-Weser	Vice-Chancellor of Germany; 1921–1922	Succeeded by Gustav Bauer
Preceded by Gustav Radbruch	Justice Minister of Germany; 1922–1923	Succeeded by Gustav Radbruch
