= Walther Schieck =

German politician (1874–1946)

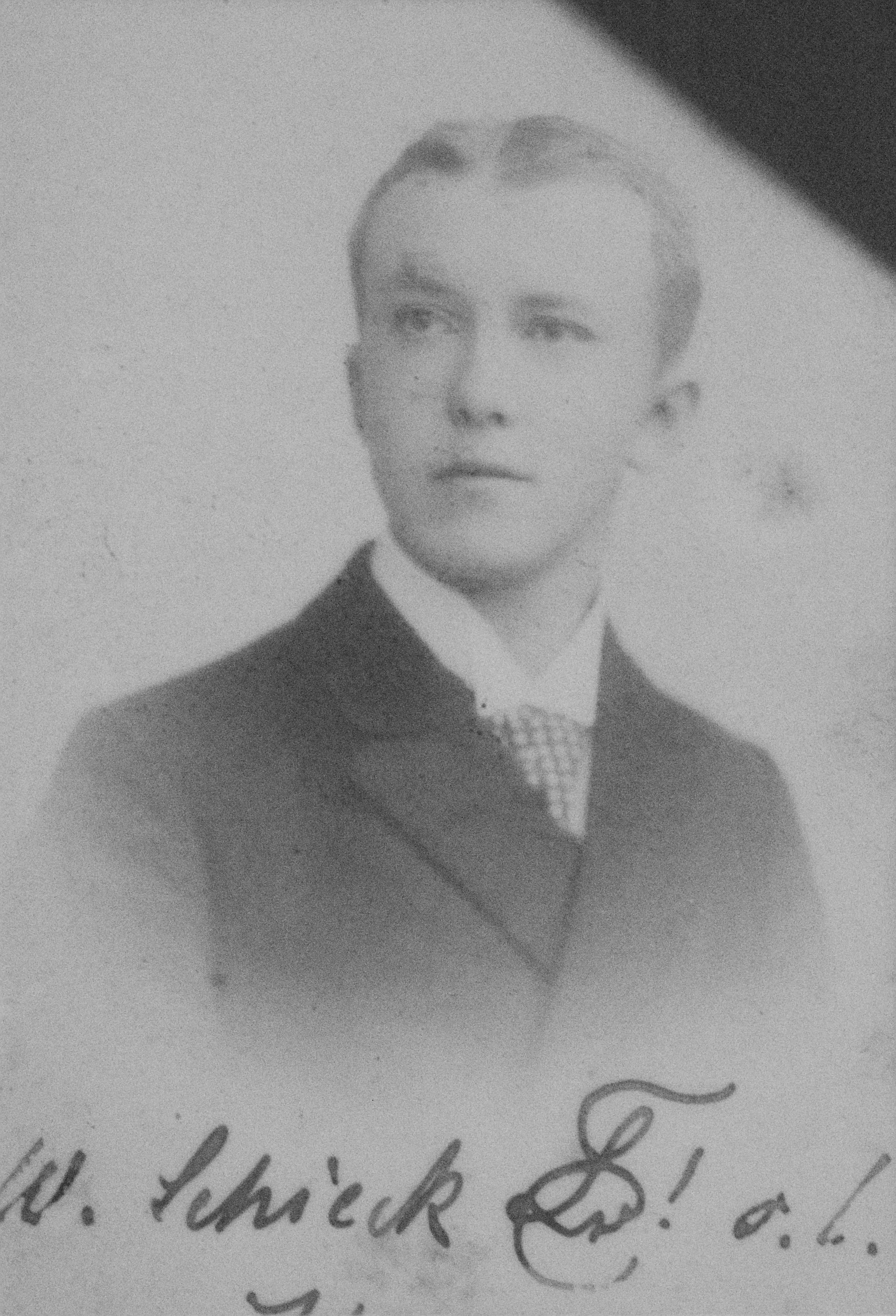
- Schieck as a student in Heidelberg

Minister-President of Saxony
- In office 6 May 1930 – 10 March 1933
- Preceded by: Wilhelm Bünger
- Succeeded by: Manfred Freiherr von Killinger

Personal details
- Born: 24 August 1874 Dresden, German Empire
- Died: 23 April 1946 (aged 71) Dresden, Germany
- Party: DVP

Karl Alfred Walther Schieck (1874-1946) was a German politician who served as the last Minister-President of Saxony during the Weimar Republic.

== Biography ==
After studying law in Heidelberg, Munich, and Leipzig, Schieck worked from 1906 in the Saxon Ministry of Finance. Schieck was a member of the DVP and was elected Minister-President of Saxony on 6 May 1930. His cabinet consisted mostly of differing parties. As Minister-President, he also served as the Minister of Education. Schieck resigned on 13 May 1930, but legally held the office until his dismissal in 1933. He was buried in the Johannisfriedhof in Dresden.
