= Gustav Neuring =

German politician (1879–1919)

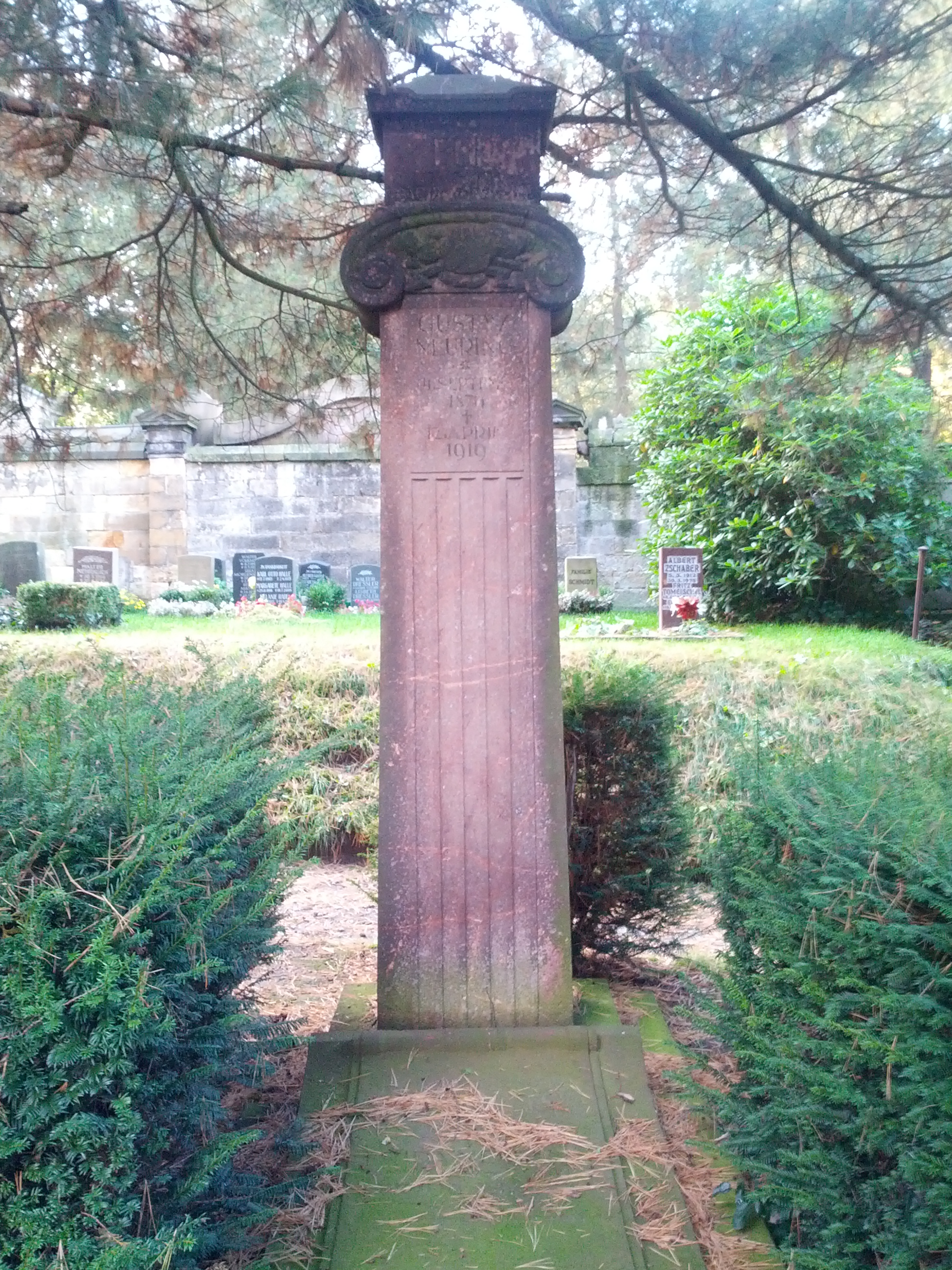
Tombstone in Tolkewitz Cemetery

Gustav Neuring (14 September 1879 – 12 April 1919) was a German politician. He died in a lynching.

Neuring was a member of the Social Democratic Party of Germany. Following the German Revolution he served as the war minister (Kriegsminister) of the Free State of Saxony (Der Freistaat Sachsen). On 12 April 1919, during the German Revolution in Saxony, a mob of war veterans, upset by rumours that their war pensions would be cut, threw him into the river Elbe in Dresden. When he tried to get back into the riverbank, Neuring was shot.
