= Wilhelm Buck =

German politician

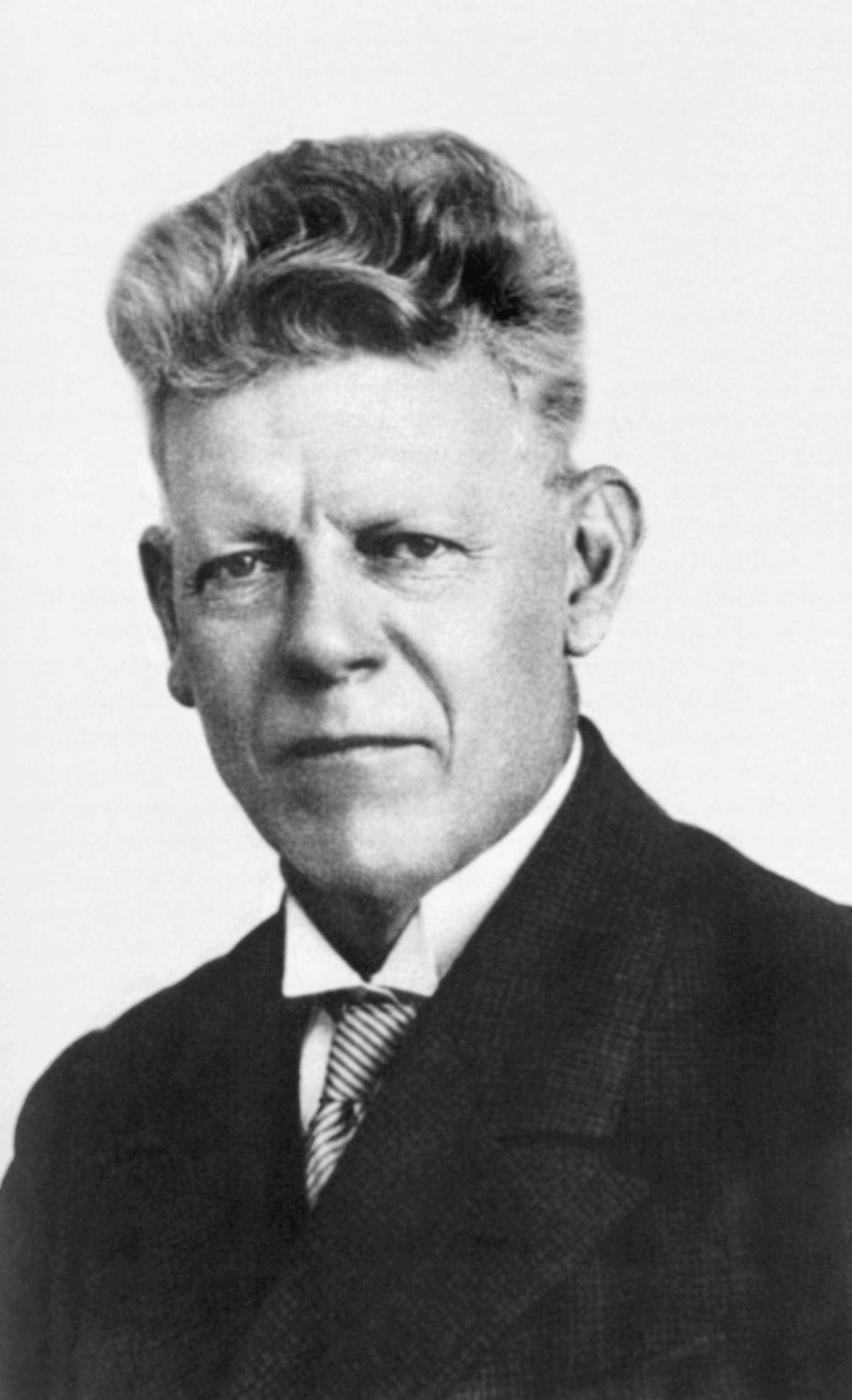
- Wilhelm Buck

Minister-President of the Free State of Saxony
- In office 1920–1923
- Preceded by: Georg Gradnauer
- Succeeded by: Erich Zeigner

Member of the Reichstag
- In office 1920–1924

Member of the Imperial Reichstag
- In office 1913–1918

Member of Dresden City Council
- In office 1908–1917

Personal details
- Born: 12 November 1869 Bautzen, Kingdom of Saxony
- Died: 2 December 1945 (aged 76) Radebeul, Soviet Occupation Zone
- Party: Social Democratic Party of Germany (1932– & 1887–1926); Old Social Democratic Party of Germany (1926–1932)

Johann Wilhelm Buck (12 November 1869 in Bautzen, Kingdom of Saxony – 2 December 1945 in Radebeul) was a German politician and representative of the Social Democratic Party and the splinter party, Old Social Democratic Party of Germany. From 5 May 1920 to 21 March 1923, he was minister-president of the Free State of Saxony.

== Biography ==
Buck was born in 1869 in Bautzen, to Sorbian Protestant parents. His father was a cart owner and tenant farmer. Before he started school, his family moved to Dresden. After elementary school and an apprenticeship, Buck worked as a plasterer's assistant there until 1905. In 188, he joined the Social Democratic Party. He joined the independent trade unions, served as a shop steward for the plasterers from 1892 to 1904, and as an assessor on the workers' insurance arbitration panel from 1900 to 1905. In 1905, he became a trade union secretary and then, from 1907, a workers' secretary in Dresden, a position he held until 1918.

From 1908 to 1917, he served on the Dresden City Council for the SPD, and in 1917/1918 on the City Executive Board. After an unsuccessful candidacy in the 1912 Reichstag election in the Reichstag constituency Kingdom of Saxony 3, Buck entered parliament in a by-election following the death of his party colleague August Kaden in 1913, representing the 4th Saxon constituency (Dresden, right bank of the Elbe), and remained a member until the end of the German Empire.

During the November Revolution until October 1919, Buck was first a People's Representative and then Minister of Culture for the Free State of Saxony. In January 1919, he was elected to the Weimar National Assembly as a representative of the Saxony 1 constituency. During the first legislative period of the Weimar Republic (1920–1924), he again served in the Reichstag for Dresden-Bautzen.

From May 5, 1920, to March 21, 1923, Buck served as Minister-President of the Free State of Saxony, leading three governments (until December 1920, a coalition of the SPD and the liberal DDP; then with the left-wing USPD; and after the reunification of the Social Democrats in 1922, a single-party SPD government). He was also a member of the Reichsrat. Subsequently, until his dismissal by the National Socialists in 1933, Buck was Kreishauptmann in Dresden. Furthermore, from 1924 to 1929, he was a member of the board of directors of the Deutsche Reichsbahn.

In May 1926, Buck – like Max Heldt and the majority of the state parliament faction – was expelled from the SPD and became a co-founder of the Old Social Democratic Party of Germany (ASPD) and its chairman. Buck represented this party in the Saxon State Parliament from 1929 to 1930.

== See also ==
- List of Social Democratic Party of Germany politicians
