= Alfred Fellisch =

German politician (1884–1973)

Member of the Saxon Parliament
- In office 1918–1926

Minister of economy of the Free State of Saxony (Weimar Republic)
- In office May 1921 – 4 January 1924

Minister President of the Free State of Saxony
- In office 31 October 1923 – 4 January 1924

Saxon Secretary of State of economy and economic planning
- In office May 1946 – March 1948

Saxon Minister of economy and economic planning
- In office April 1948 – September 1949

Personal details
- Born: 1 June 1884 Fraustadt, Province of Posen, German Empire (Wschowa, Poland)
- Died: 4 March 1973 (aged 88) Radebeul, East Germany
- Party: Social Democratic Party of Germany (–1946); Socialist Unity Party of Germany (1946–1973)
- Occupation: glovemaker
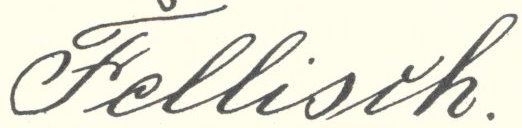
- Signature

Alfred Fellisch (1 June 1884 – 4 March 1973) was a German Social democrat and socialist politician. He was Saxon minister of economics both in the Weimar Republic and in postwar East Germany and briefly Minister President of the Free State of Saxony (1923–1924).

Fellisch was born in Fraustadt, Province of Posen, German Empire (Wschowa, Poland), his father was a butcher. He attended primary school and was trained as a glovemaker, a profession he exercised until 1912. In 1912 and 1913 he attended the Social Democratic Party school in Berlin and started to work for the Volksstimme ("People's Voice") newspaper in Chemnitz in 1913. In 1914 he became a member of the SPD party executive of Saxony. From 1914 to 1921 Fellisch was the chairman of the young workers organization in Chemnitz. In 1919 he became a member of the town council of Chemnitz and worked as a secretary of the Social Democratic fraction in the Saxon Parliament. He ran unsuccessfully in the Reichstag election of 1920 in the district 33.

Fellisch served as Saxon Minister of economics from May 1921 to January 1924 and, after the dismissal of Erich Zeigner by German President Friedrich Ebert, Minister President from 31 October 1923 to 4 January 1924. From 1924 to 1933 he was the head of the regional administration (Amtshauptmann) of Annaberg.

Following World War II the Soviet Military Administration in Germany appointed him as "Regierungsrat" in Stollberg and "Landrat" of the Annaberg district. With the merger of the Social Democrat Party and the Communist Party of Germany in the Soviet occupation zone he became a member of the Socialist Unity Party of Germany in April 1946.

From May 1946 to March 1948 Fellisch was Secretary of State of economy and economic planning of Saxony. He followed Fritz Selbmann, who became deputy chairman of the German Economic Commission, as Minister of economy and economic planning of Saxony from April 1948 to September 1949.

From 1949 until his retirement in 1952 he was the director of the Saxon State Library. Fellisch died on 4 March 1973 in Radebeul.
