= Wilhelm Bünger =

German politician

Minister-President of Saxony
- In office 26 June 1929 – 18 February 1930
- Preceded by: Max Heldt
- Succeeded by: Walther Schieck

Personal details
- Born: 8 October 1870 Elsterwerda, North German Confederation
- Died: 21 March 1937 (aged 66) Leipzig, Nazi Germany
- Party: DVP

Wilhelm Rudolf Ferdinand Bünger (1870–1937) was a German politician and attorney who served as the Minister-President of Saxony from 1929 to 1930.

== Biography ==
Bünger was born on 8 October 1870 in Elsterwerda, Prussia, North German Confederation (present-day Brandenburg, Germany). He was a member of the German People's Party (DVP) and from 1920 to 1930 served as a member of the Landtag of Saxony. From 1924 to 1927, Bünger was Minister of Justice, 1928 Minister of Education, and from 26 June 1929 to 18 February 1930, Minister-President of Saxony. He was married to Doris Hertwig-Bünger, a member of the Reichstag, and lived with her in the Landhaus Carp Schampel, in the Saxon town of Radebeul. He died on 21 March 1937 in Leipzig, Saxony, Germany.

Bünger was the presiding judge at the Reichstag fire trial. He acquitted the accused with the exception of Marinus van der Lubbe. However, he found that the "Reichstag fire was no act of individual terror but an act of mass terror which was designed to be the overture to a general strike and a revolutionary movement," placing the blame on a Communist conspiracy.
