= Max Heldt =

German politician

- Heldt in 1926

Minister-President of Saxony
- In office 4 January 1924 – 26 June 1929
- Preceded by: Alfred Karl Fellisch
- Succeeded by: Wilhelm Bünger

Personal details
- Born: Max Wilhelm August Held; 4 November 1872 Potsdam, German Empire
- Died: 27 December 1933 (aged 61) Dresden, Nazi Germany
- Party: SPD (until 1926); ASPD (from 1926)

Max Wilhelm August Heldt (4 November 1872 – 27 December 1933) was a German politician who served as the Minister-President of Saxony from 1924 to 1929.

== Biography ==
Heldt was born on 4 November 1872 in Potsdam, Prussia, German Empire (present-day Brandenburg, Germany).

From 1908 to 1926 Heldt served as an MP in the Landtag of Saxony as a member for the Social Democratic Party of Germany (SPD) and from 1926-1930 he served as an MP for the Old Social Democratic Party of Germany (ASPD). In 1918 he served a delegate to the 1st Congress of Workers' and Soldiers' Councils in Berlin. From 1919-1929 he was the Plenipotentiary of Saxony to the Weimar Republic. From 1920-1924 he served as Saxon Finance Minister. He served as the Minister-President of Saxony from 4 January 1924 to 26 June 1929. He rejoined the SPD in 1932.

Heldt died on 27 December 1933 at the age of 61 in Dresden, Saxony, Germany.
