= Georg Gradnauer =

German politician (1866–1946)

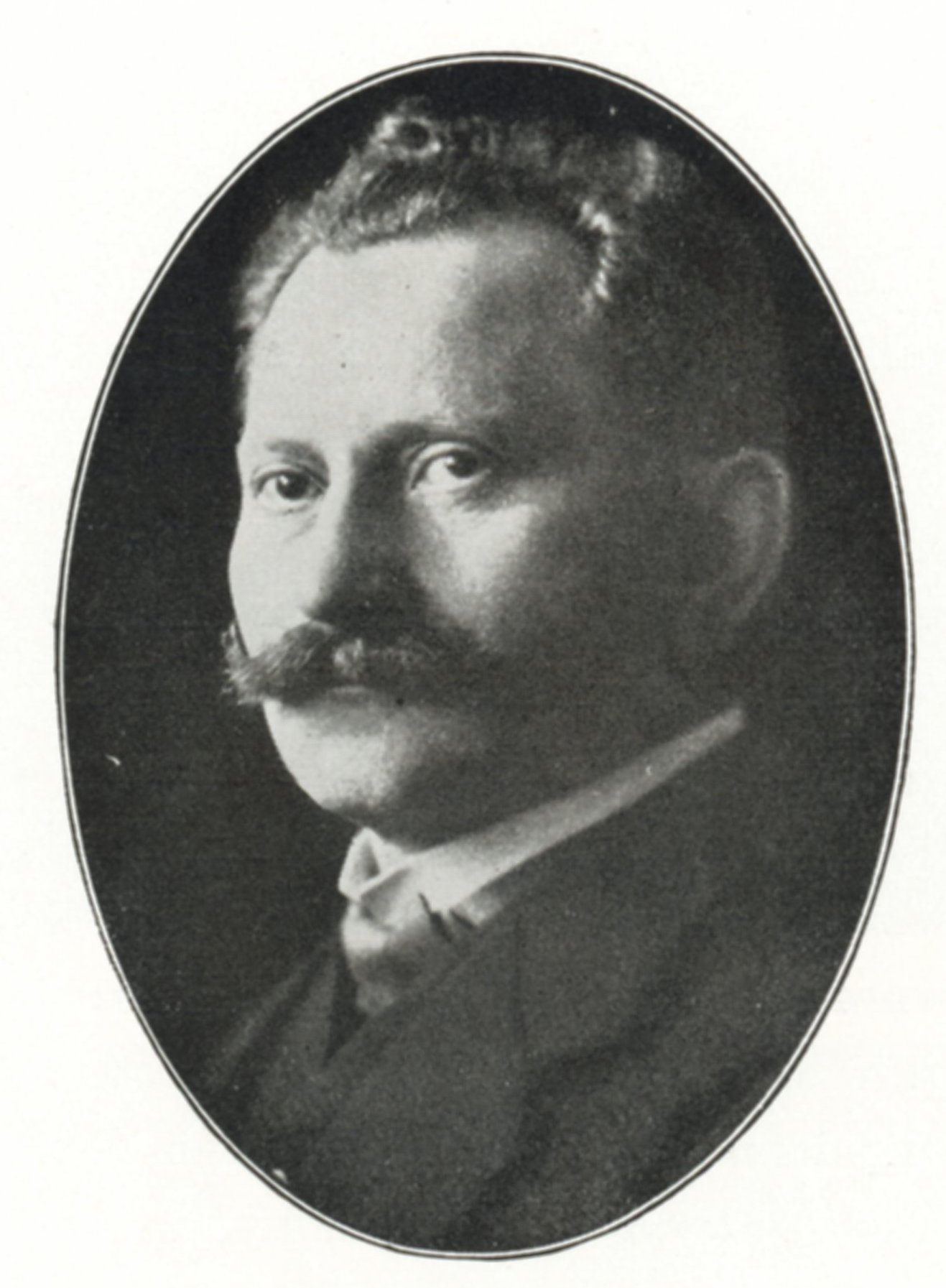
Georg Gradnauer c. 1931

Georg Gradnauer (16 November 1866 – 18 November 1946) was a German newspaper editor and politician for the Social Democratic Party of Germany (SPD), and the first elected Minister-President of Saxony following the end of the monarchy.

== Education and early career ==
Born in Magdeburg, Gradnauer earned a PhD in 1889, and became editor of the Sächsische Arbeiterzeitung (later Dresdner Volkszeitung), the SPD paper in Saxony, in 1891. A relative moderate within the Saxon SPD, he was replaced as editor by radicals Alexander Parvus and Julian Marchlewski in 1896. Gradnauer subsequently moved to the SPD's Berlin paper, Vorwärts, where he worked from 1897 with fellow reformists Friedrich Stampfer and Kurt Eisner, until 1905, when they were ousted in favor of editors from the SPD's left wing. Gradnauer then returned to head the Sächsische Arbeiterzeitung once more, meanwhile renamed Dresdner Volkszeitung, and remained in that role until the outbreak of the German Revolution in 1918. In parallel with this newspaper work, he served as an SPD delegate to the Reichstag, in two stints: 1898 to 1907, and 1912 to 1918.

== Later political career ==
After taking an active role in the German Revolution in Saxony, Gradnauer initially served as Minister of Justice in the new republican government of Saxony in 1918, and soon succeeded Richard Lipinski as Minister of the Interior and chair of the provisional government. The SPD won a plurality of the votes in the first Saxon elections under the Weimar Republic, on February 2, 1919, and Gradnauer ended up forming a minority government, becoming Saxony's first constitutional Minister-President on March 14. His minority government was formed after an attempt to form a coalition with the Independent SPD (USPD) foundered over the USPD's demand for recognition of workers' councils, and Gradnauer's preferred alternative, a coalition with the German Democratic Party (DDP), was rejected by the majority of SPD delegates.

Gradnauer served as Minister-President for a little over a year. In May 1919, he used the military and Freikorps to put down left-wing radicals in Leipzig, in a small-scale reprise of the actions taken by the SPD national government under Friedrich Ebert in putting down the Spartacist uprising some months prior. This furthered the rift with the USPD, but enabled an SPD–DDP coalition in October 1919, with Gradnauer continuing as Minister-President at the head of the now-majority government. Left-wing resentment within the SPD began to build in early 1920, however, and Gradnauer was forced to resign in April 1920, with opposition to his use of the military against the radical left being joined by discontent over his unwillingness to replace conservative elements of the bureaucracy with Social Democrats. He was succeeded as Minister-President by Wilhelm Buck.

After resigning as Minister-President, Gradnauer was reelected to the Reichstag, serving from 1920 to 1924, and briefly (1921) holding a cabinet post as Minister of the Interior under Joseph Wirth. He also served as delegate of the Saxon state government to Berlin from 1921 to 1932.

He was initially arrested by the Nazis in 1933, but released. Being of Jewish origin, he was eventually sent to Theresienstadt concentration camp in 1944, but survived and was liberated in 1945. Gradnaur joined the Socialist Unity Party in 1946 and died a few months later in Berlin.

== Sources ==
- Lapp, Benjamin (1997). Revolution from the Right: Politics, Class, and the Rise of Nazism in Saxony, 1919–1933. BRILL. ISBN 0-391-04027-8.
- Pulzer, Peter (2003). Jews and the German State: The Political History of a Minority, 1848–1933. Wayne State University Press. ISBN 0-8143-3130-0.
