= Reichsexekution =

German intervention against a member state

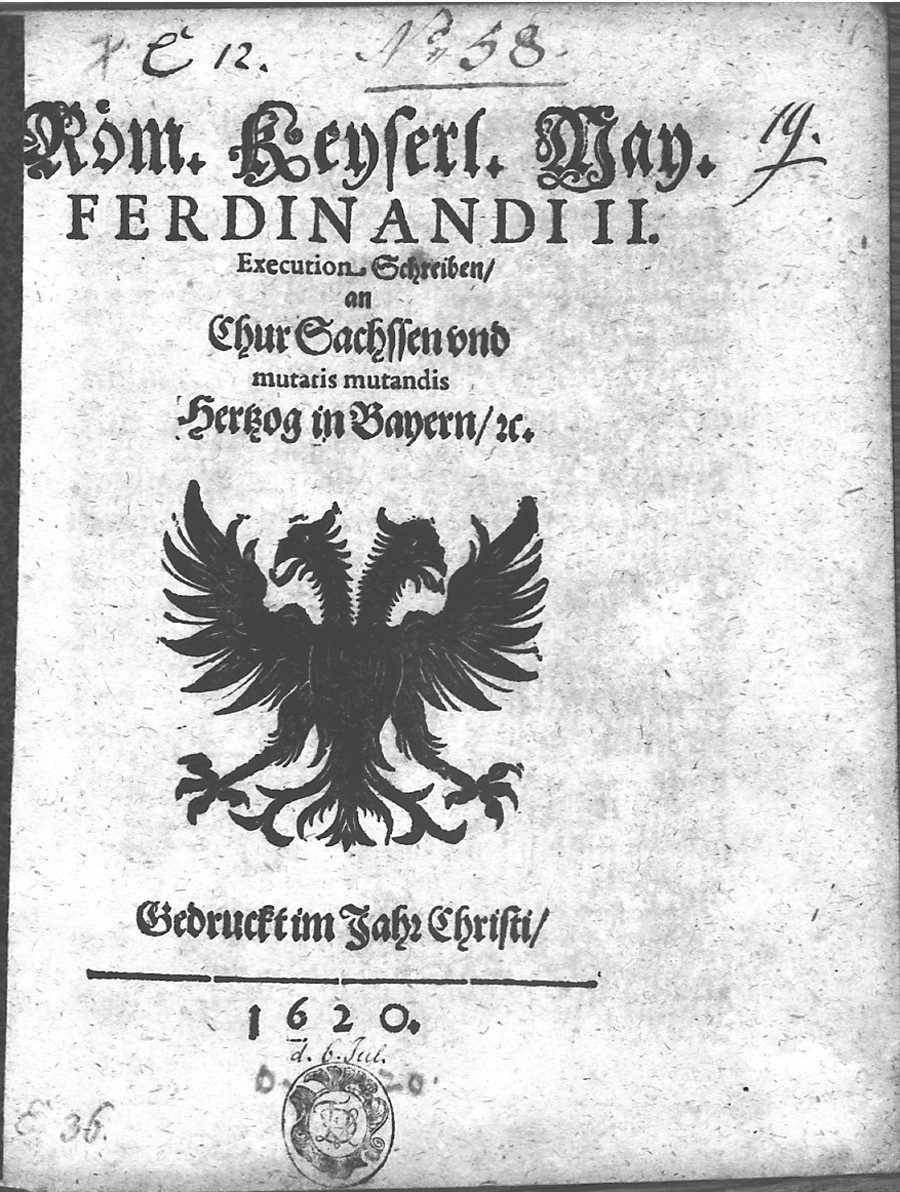
Ferdinand II's Reichsexekution against Saxony and Bavaria in 1620

In German history, a Reichsexekution (sometimes "Reich execution" in English) was an imperial or federal intervention against a member state, using military force if necessary. The instrument of the Reichsexekution was constitutionally available to the central governments of the Holy Roman Empire (800–1806), the German Empire of 1848–1849, the German Empire of 1871–1918, the Weimar Republic (1918–1933) and Nazi Germany (1933–1945). Under the German Confederation (1815–1866) and the North German Confederation (1867–1871), the same right belonged to the confederal government and is called Bundesexekution.

== Holy Roman Empire ==
The basis of the Holy Roman Emperor's right to act against an Imperial Estate, by military means if necessary, lay in the imperial reforms enacted by the Diet of Worms in 1495, most importantly the declaration of Eternal Peace within the bounds of the empire. Against those who broke the peace, the emperor could obtain a ruling from the Imperial Chamber Court or the Imperial Aulic Council and then issue a Reichsexekution against the offending estate. Often, the imperial execution would be delegated to one or several other estates belong to the same Imperial Circle as the offender. When this was insufficient, it fell to the empire as a whole and the Reichsarmee (imperial army) to enforce the verdict of the court, resulting in a full Reichskrieg (imperial war), which may be known as a Reichsexekutionskrieg or Exekutionskrieg. This final escalation required the approval of the Imperial Diet after 1648.

There were numerous Reichsexekutionen in the Holy Roman Empire:

- against the knight Götz von Berlichingen in 1514
- against the Anabaptist government of Münster in 1535
- against the Schmalkaldic League in 1546, for which see Schmalkaldic War
- against John Frederick II, Duke of Saxony, in 1566
- against the imperial city of Donauwörth in 1607
- against Maximilian I, Elector of Bavaria, and John George I, Elector of Saxony, in 1620 during the Thirty Years' War
- against the Duchies of Bremen and Verden, which belonged to the Swedish Crown, in 1675, for which see Bremen-Verden Campaign
- against the imperial city of Hamburg in 1708
- against Karl Leopold, Duke of Mecklenburg-Schwerin, in 1719
- against Frederick II, King in Prussia, in 1757, for which see Third Silesian War
- against the Republic of Liège in 1789

== German Empire of 1848–1849 ==
During the German revolutions of 1848–1849, the Frankfurt Parliament created a Provisional Central Government for all Germany. Although the act of parliament did not grant this body the right of Reichsexekution, the Frankfurt Constitution that came into effect on 28 March 1849 did grant it to the imperial government (which never in fact came into being).

In January 1849, the Frankfurt Parliament passed a law banning casinos and other gaming establishments. It was to take effect on 1 May. The Landgraviate of Hesse-Homburg demanded compensation for the loss of its lucrative Spielbank Bad Homburg, but this was refused. On 9 March, Hesse-Homburg formally protested the law and on 1 May it had not complied. On 7 May, the provisional government sent a Reichskommissar, Theodor Friedrich Knyn, to Homburg with 700 troops in order to carry out a Reichsexekution.

== Weimar Republic ==
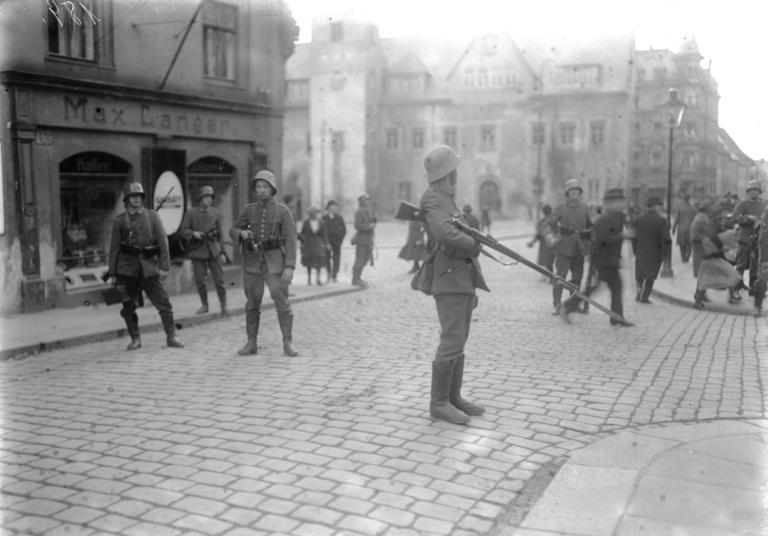
Soldiers on the streets during the Reichsexekution against communists in Saxony in 1923

Under Article 19 of the Bismarckian Constitution (1871–1918), a Reichsexekution could be undertaken only with the permission of the Bundesrat (Federal Council). After 1918, Reichsexekution was provided for by Paragraph 1 of Article 48 of the Weimar Constitution. Unused by the empire, it was employed four times between 1919 and 1933 against the following states:

- Thuringia (March 1920), against radical left governments that had formed in the region
- Gotha (April 1920), when Gotha (in Thuringia) persisted in its attempts to set up a radical left government
- Saxony (1923), for which see German October
- Prussia (1932), for which see 1932 Prussian coup d'état

== Bundesexekution ==
The right of Bundesexekution was confirmed by Article 26 of the Final Act of the Viennese Ministerial Conferences on 15 May 1820. This was the treaty that gave the German Confederation its final structure. It permitted the military occupation of a state that was in violation of confederal law, the assumption of executive powers by a Bundeskommissar, the deposition of the ruling prince and the abrogation of all unconstitutional laws. In the German Confederation, a Bundesexekution was distinct from a Bundeskrieg (federal war), which was waged by the confederation as a whole against an external enemy, and a Bundesintervention (federal intervention), which was an intervention by the confederation on behalf of a member state to maintain order. The following Bundesexekutionen took place under the Confederation:

- against the Duchy of Brunswick in 1830, because its duke, Charles II, refused to recognise the constitution accepted by his guardian, George IV of the United Kingdom, when he was a minor
- against the Free City of Frankfurt in 1834 during the Frankfurter Wachensturm
- against the duchies of Holstein and Lauenburg in 1863, which led to the Second Schleswig War in 1864
- against Prussia in 1866, because of a dispute over the government of occupied Schleswig-Holstein, which led to the Austro-Prussian War and the collapse of the confederation

The same right of Bundesexekution is found in Article 19 of the North German Constitution of 26 June 1867.
