= Erich Zeigner =

Prime Minister of Saxony (1886–1949)

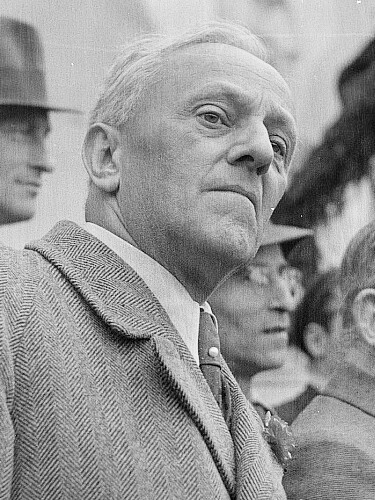
- Zeigner in 1948

Mayor of Leipzig
- In office 1945–1949
- Preceded by: Wilhelm Johannes Vierling
- Succeeded by: Max Opitz

Minister President of the Free State of Saxony
- In office 1923–1923
- Preceded by: Wilhelm Buck
- Succeeded by: Rudolf Heinze

Minister of Justice of the Free State of Saxony
- In office 1921–1923
- Preceded by: Rudolf Harnisch
- Succeeded by: Alfred Neu
Parliamentary constituencies
Member of the Volksrat
In office
1948–1949
Member of the Landtag of Saxony
In office
1946–1949
In office
1922–1923

Personal details
- Born: February 17, 1886 Erfurt, German Empire
- Died: April 5, 1949 (aged 63) Leipzig, Soviet Occupation Zone
- Resting place: Südfriedhof, Leipzig
- Party: Socialist Unity Party of Germany (1946–); Social Democratic Party of Germany (1919–1946)
- Education: Leipzig University

Erich Zeigner (17 February 1886 – 5 April 1949) was a German politician. He was Prime Minister of the German state of Saxony during the attempted communist uprising of 1923.

In August 1921 Zeigner was Minister of Justice of Saxony. On 21 March 1923 he became the third prime minister of the Free State of Saxony. On 10 October 1923 he appointed two members of the Communist Party as members of the government. On 27 October 1923, German Chancellor Gustav Stresemann issued an ultimatum demanding a dismissal of the Communist ministers. Zeigner refused to comply and, two days later, was deposed as prime minister by the President of Germany Friedrich Ebert (SPD) under the authority of Article 48 of the Weimar constitution. Zeigner was replaced by a commissioner.

On 21 November 1923 Zeigner was arrested for alleged corruption in office and sentenced in the spring of 1924 to three years in prison, from which he was released on probation in August 1925.

In 1932, he signed the Urgent Appeal against the Nazi Party. He was arrested in August 1933 after the Nazis had come to power, but was acquitted at trial in 1935. Afterwards, he made his living off doing odd jobs. In 1939, he was re-imprisoned for a short time, while he worked as a bookkeeper in Leipzig. After the failed attempt to assassinate Hitler on 20 July 1944, Zeigner, Stanislaw Trabalski, and Heinrich Fleißner were kidnapped, and other Leipzig social democrats were imprisoned in the Sachsenhausen concentration camp. In August 1944 he was moved to the Buchenwald concentration camp.

Zeigner returned to Leipzig in 1945, was in June or July 1945 in a legal council with the city administration in Leipzig, and was appointed on 16 July 1945 by the commander of the Soviet military administration in Leipzig, Lieutenant General Nikolai Trufanov, as Lord Mayor of the city of Leipzig. He would hold this office until his death. In October 1946 he was confirmed as Lord Mayor by an election.

Zeigner died of natural causes on 5 April 1949. It has been suggested that after his dismissal, fear for his life and the welfare of his family prevented Zeigner from either resisting his dismissal at the time, or publicly denouncing the Nazi regime at a later date.
