= Albert Neuhaus =

German politician and civil servant (1873-1948)

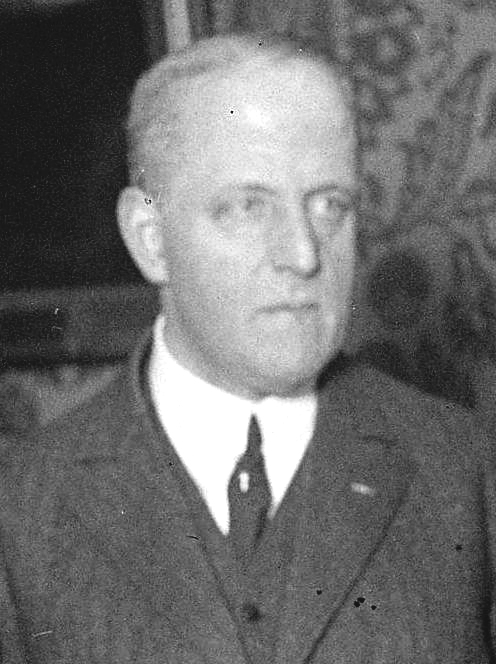
- Neuhaus in 1925.

Reich Minister of Economics
- In office January 15, 1925 – 26 October 1925
- President: Friedrich Ebert; Paul von Hindenburg
- Chancellor: Hans Luther
- Preceded by: Eduard Hamm
- Succeeded by: Rudolf Krohne (acting)

Personal details
- Born: July 9, 1873 Glasgow, Scotland
- Died: 29 April 1948 (aged 74) Wuppertal-Elberfeld, North Rhine-Westphalia, British occupation zone in Germany
- Party: DNVP
- Education: University of Erlangen–Nuremberg
- Occupation: Lawyer

Albert Neuhaus (9 July 1873 - 29 April 1948) was a German politician and civil servant of the DNVP. He most notably served as Reich Minister of Economics in Hans Luther's cabinet from 15 January to 26 October 1925, when he resigned, and was succeeded by Rudolf Krohne.

Neuhaus was born into a family of Rhenish manufacturers, although his father had been residing in Scotland to run a business. He attended university studying in law, and eventually received his Doctor of Law degree from the University of Erlangen–Nuremberg in 1896. He then went into being a civil servant for the Prussian state government, and be 1909 became a Government Councillor. He reached his most senior civil servant position as a Ministerial Director and Real Senior Privy Councillor in 1918. Neuhaus left the government in 1920 he work in the private sector, which he would do until he was appointed minister.

A member of the nationalist party, DNVP, he was appointed Reich Minister of Economics in January 1925. During this time he criticized the German private industry for their spending of foreign capital, and largely spent his time responding to the previous hyperinflation. Notable laws passed during his tenure to achieve this was the Loan Liquidation Act and Bond Redemption Law. He eventually resigned in October 1925, as did two other members of the DNVP in Luther's cabinet. This was in response to the Locarno Treaties, which were sent to the Reichstag, but of which the DNVP declared unsatisfactory because they wished for no concessions to France. After he left, he spent the rest of his career in obscurity and died in 1948.

== Early life ==
Albert Neuhaus was born on 9 July 1873 in Glasgow, Scotland, into a family who were Rhenish manufacturers. His father had been residing in Scotland to set up a business. He attended a gymnasium in Neuwied. He then studied at Heidelberg University and later the University of Bonn, and joined the Corps Suevia Heidelberg, a student fraternity, in 1893. He graduated from the University of Erlangen–Nuremberg in 1896 as a Doctor of Law. After graduating, he was an advisor at the bank H. Albert de Bary & Co in Antwerp.

== Civil career ==
In 1901 he became an assessor for the Prussian state government in Düsseldorf. By 1902 he was an unskilled worker in Berlin at the Prussian Ministry of Trade and Industry. In 1909 he was promoted to Government Councillor, in 1910 to Privy Councillor and Lecturer Councillor. In 1914 he became Privy Senior Government Councillor. Four years later he was promoted to Ministerial Director and Real Senior Privy Councillor. In 1920 he left civil service to work in the private sector, where he worked at until he was appointed minister. During this time he publicly commented on the debate of whether to keep German colonies by stating that they were necessary as space for German human settlement, a position he would continuously defend.

=== Reich Minister of Economics ===
Neuhaus was appointed Reich Minister of Economics on 15 January 1925 in the Hans Luther. He was a member of the DNVP.

He criticized the German private industry for spending foreign capital from the United States on advertising and other social activities instead of using it to increase production, and he also urged for more agricultural production to lessen purchases of food from abroad. During his term, prices dropped in the second quarter of 1925 due to compromise legislation for investors, who expected partial compensation because of mark debt, which existed due to hyperinflation. The Loan Liquidation Act was also passed, which qualified 73 billion reichsmarks Reich debt for conversion to 1.8 billion reichsmarks loan liquidation debt. Another important law passed during his time as minister was the Bond Redemption Law on 16 July which stipulated what German Reich bonds issued in the old Reich currency could be exchanged for German Reich loan redemption debt.

He officially resigned on 26 October 1925. The reason for his resignation was due to the Locarno Treaties, which was sent to the Reichstag, but of which the DNVP declared unsatisfactory because they wished for no concessions to France.

== Personal life ==
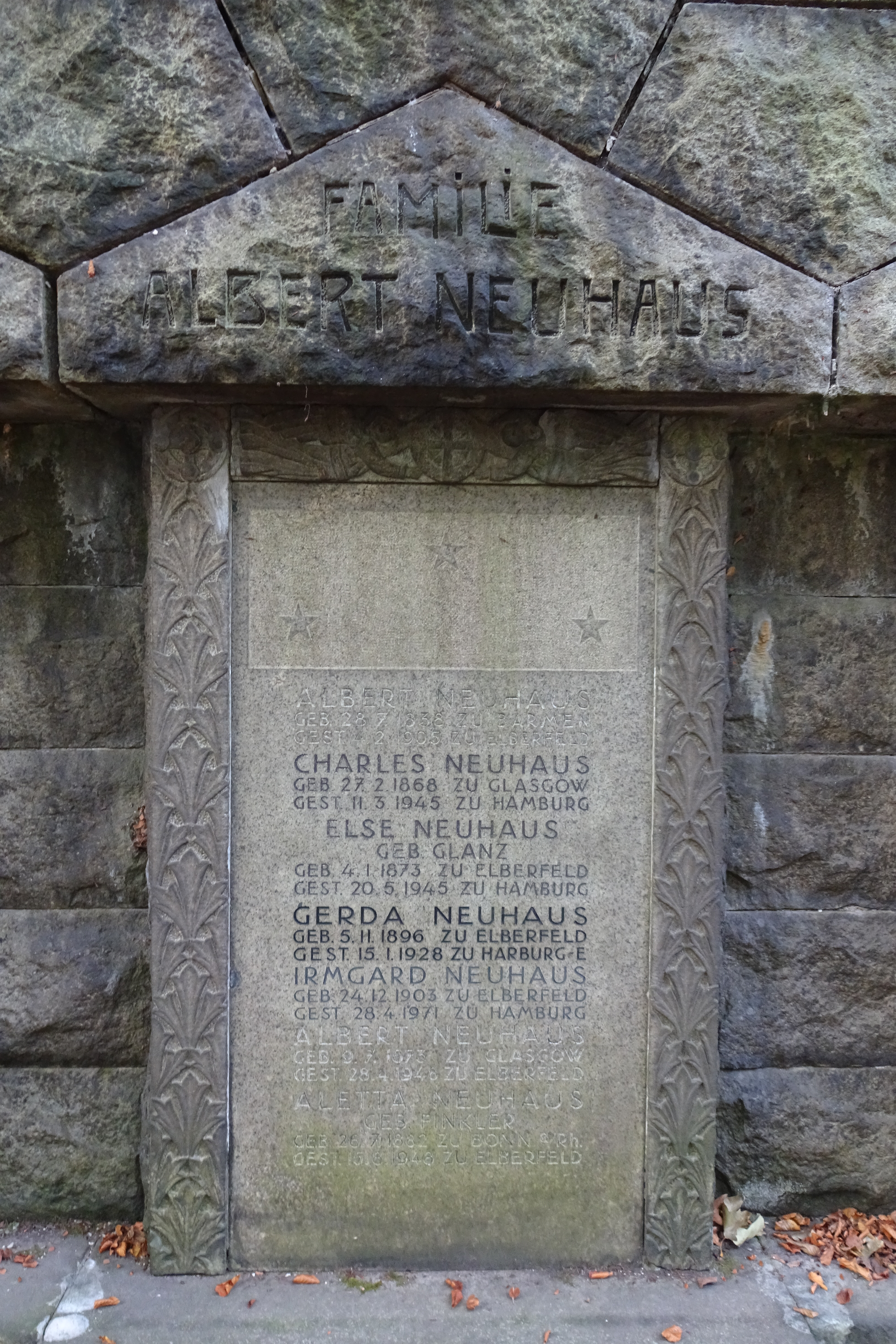
Neuhaus's grave at the Reformierte Friedhof Hochstraße in Wuppertal

He had a brother named Charles. His wife was the daughter of Dr. Dittmar Finkler, a physician and professor.

=== Death ===
Neuhaus died on 29 April 1948 in Wuppertal-Elberfeld.
