= Martin Schiele =

German politician (1870–1939)

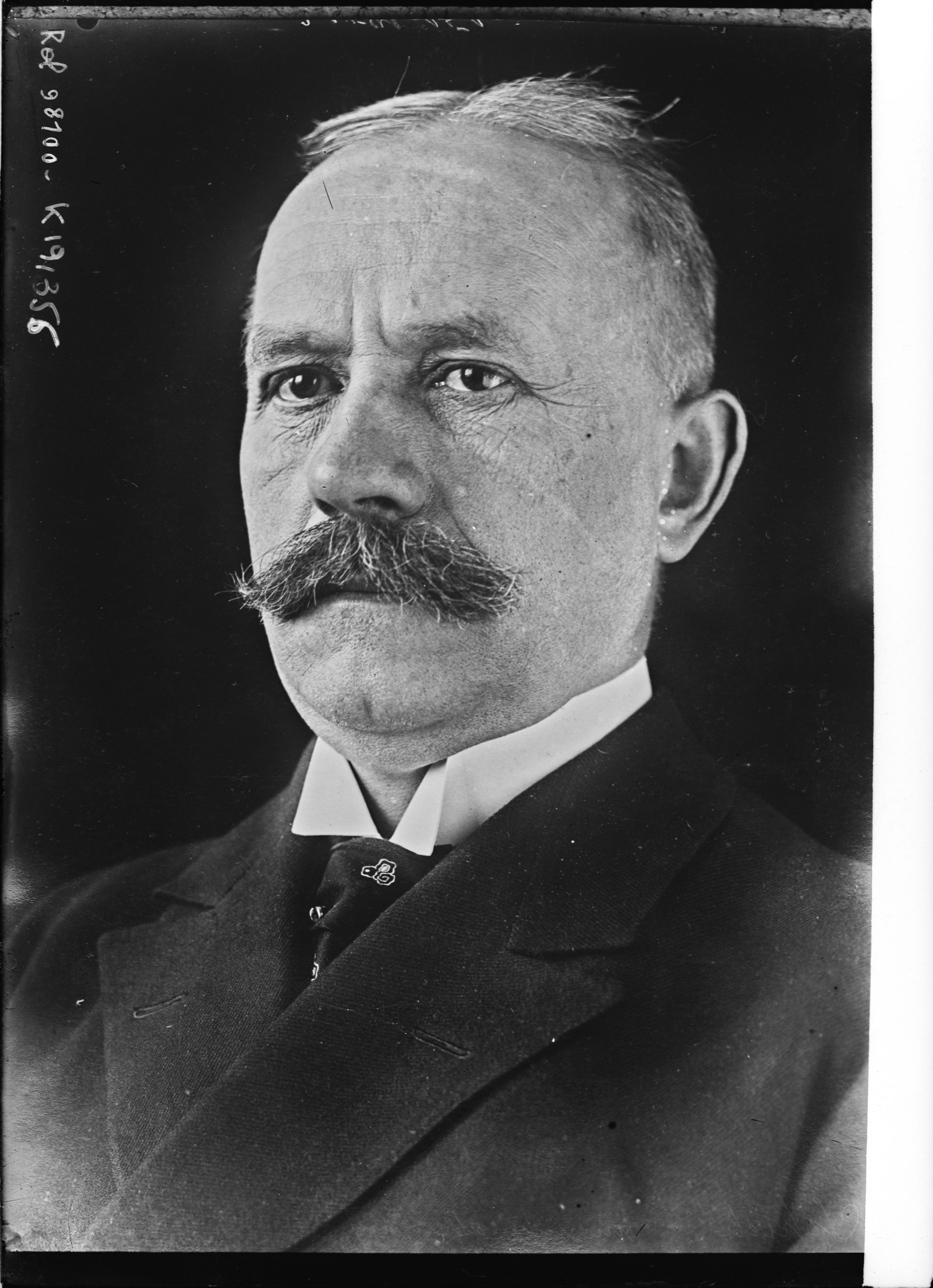
- Schiele in 1925

Reich Minister for Food and Agriculture
- In office 31 March 1930 – 1 June 1932
- Chancellor: Heinrich Brüning
- Preceded by: Hermann Dietrich
- Succeeded by: Magnus von Braun
- In office 1 February 1927 – 28 June 1928
- Chancellor: Wilhelm Marx
- Preceded by: Heinrich Haslinde
- Succeeded by: Hermann Dietrich

Member of the Reichstag
- In office 24 June 1920 – 18 July 1930
- Constituency: Magdeburg

Member of the Weimar National Assembly
- In office 6 February 1919 – 21 May 1920
- Constituency: Magdeburg

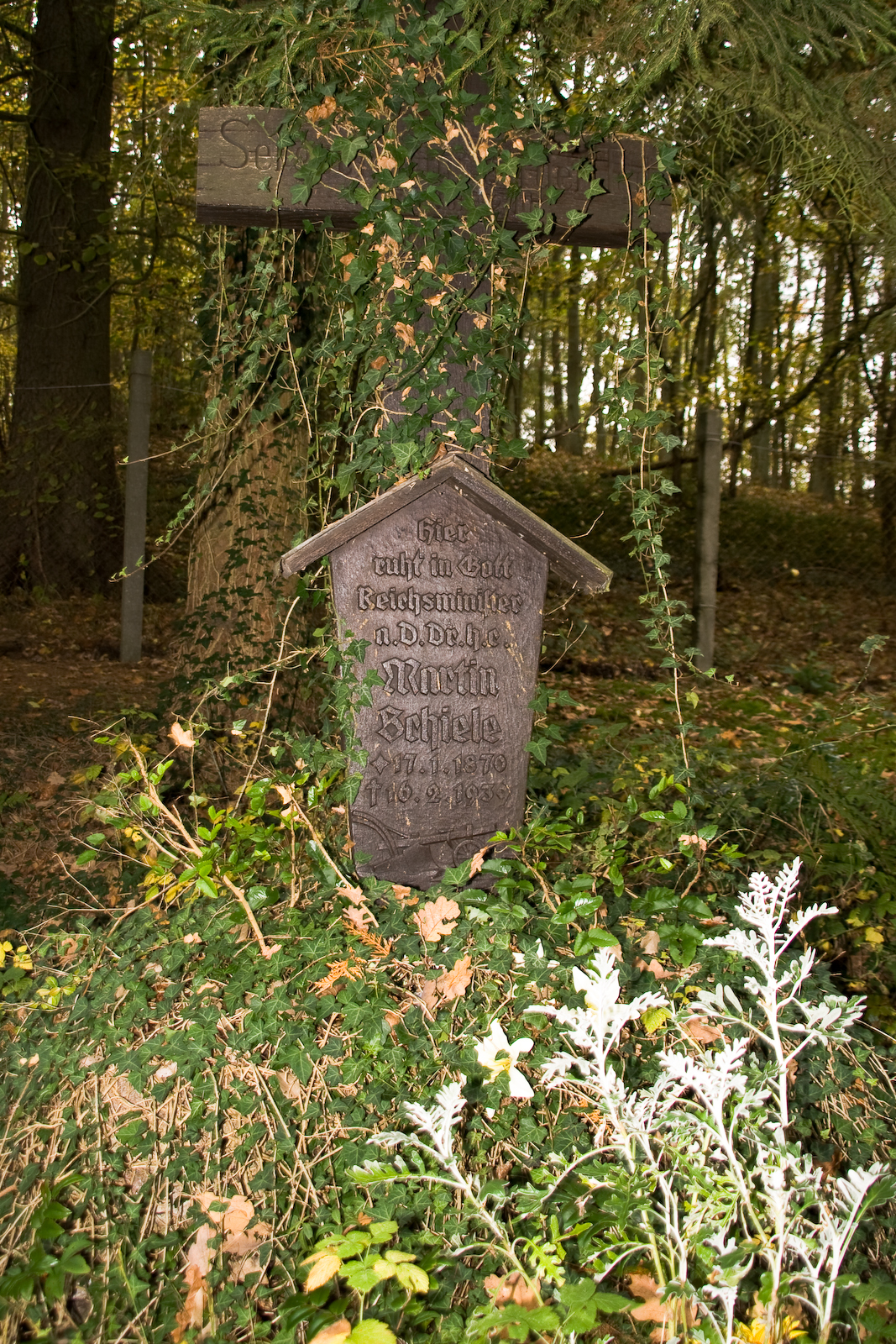
Schiele's gravestone

Martin Schiele (17 January 1870 – 16 February 1939) was a German manufacturer (brickworks in Reckling and Neu-Schollene, which also included the starch factory in Neu-Molkenberg) and lord of the manor (Rittergut Neu-Schollene near Rathenow). Schiele was also a nationalist (German Conservative Party, DNVP, CNBL), member of the Reichstag, President of the Reichslandbund, the interest group representing farmers in the German Reich, founder of the Christian National Farmers' and Rural People's Party, and in the Weimar Republic briefly Reich Minister of the Interior and twice Reich Minister for Food and Agriculture.

== Life ==
Schiele, who was of the Protestant faith, came from a farming family with his father being a manor tenant. He first entered politics in 1897 with the German Conservative Party by serving as a member by Stendal's city council later joining the Reichstag in 1914, being re-elected in 1919 as a founding member of the DNVP.

He was part of the leadership of the German National People's Party (DNVP) from its 1918 founding until Alfred Hugenberg became leader in 1928. He was also the chief representative of the agrarian wing of the DNVP. As a member of Hans Luther's coalition government, Schiele secured the restoration of agricultural and industrial protectionism with the tariff of 1925. As minister of food in 1927–28, he favored state credit as a means for subsidising agriculture. From August of 1928 to October of 1930 he served as leader of the Agricultural League, a right-wing agricultural association. Both in government and the League he aligned himself with the Junkers and with nationalism, supporting Eastern Aid and opposing Gustav Streseman's foreign policy.

He was persuaded by President Hindenburg to return as minister of food in Heinrich Brüning's cabinet. The Agricultural League under Schiele's leadership was criticised by Richard Walther Darré's Nazi agrarian apparatus. Unhappy with Hugenberg's leadership, Schiele left the DNVP and joined the newly founded CNBLP.

After the rise of the Nazis he retired to his estate in Mecklenburg.

== Family ==
Schiele was married to Thekla, née Borchmann, daughter of the wealthy merchant and brickworks owner Theodor Hubert Borchmann (1824–1882).

=== Daughter Erika ===
On 14 July 1920, Erika Schiele (b. 26 January 1899) married her fiancé 1st Lieutenant Otto Lüdecke. Otto and Erika would have four children:

- Gisela (b. 9 May 1921 in Staßfurt)
- Joachim Otto (b. 13 January 1924 in Küstrin), 2nd Lieutenant of the Wehrmacht, killed-in-action on 1 July 1944 near Nowa Niwa
- Klaus (b. 17 July 1926 in Stettin)
- Christel Ingeborg Marianne (6 December 1931 in Berlin)

Government offices
Preceded by Karl Jarres	Interior Minister of Germany; 1925	Succeeded by Otto Gessler
Preceded by Heinrich Haslinde	Minister for Food; 1927–1928	Succeeded by Hermann Dietrich
Preceded by Hermann Dietrich	Minister for Food; 1930–1932	Succeeded by Magnus Freiherr von Braun
