= Josef Frenken =

German lawyer and politician

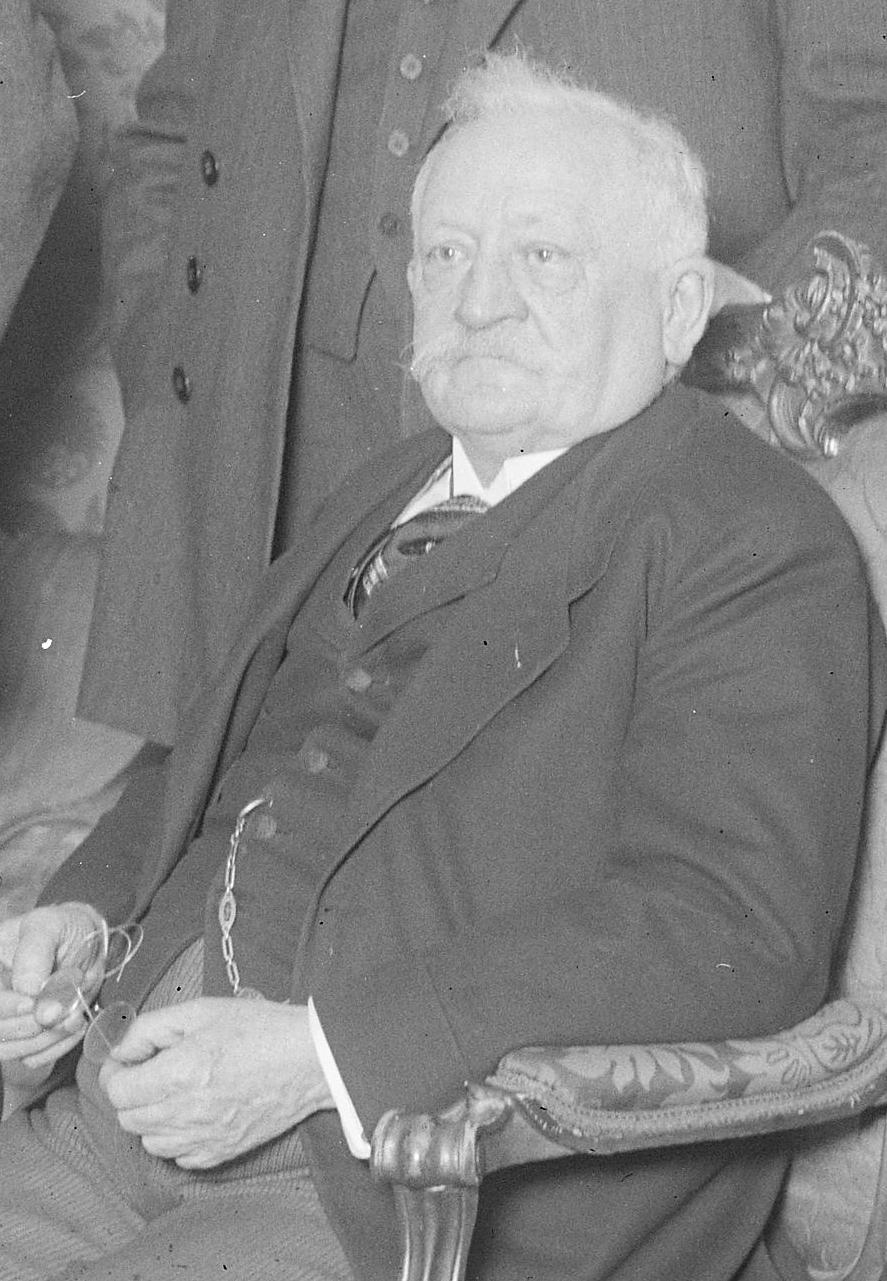

Minister of Justice
- In office 1925
- Chancellor: Hans Luther

Personal details
- Born: Lambert Josef Alois Franken; 27 September 1854 Löcken, North German Confederation
- Died: 10 September 1943 (aged 88) Cologne, Germany
- Party: Centre Party
- Occupation: Lawyer, judge

Lambert Josef Alois Frenken (27 September 1854 – 10 September 1943) was a German jurist and politician (Centre Party). During the Weimar Republic era, he briefly served as Minister of Justice in the first cabinet of Hans Luther (from January to November 1925).

== Life and career ==
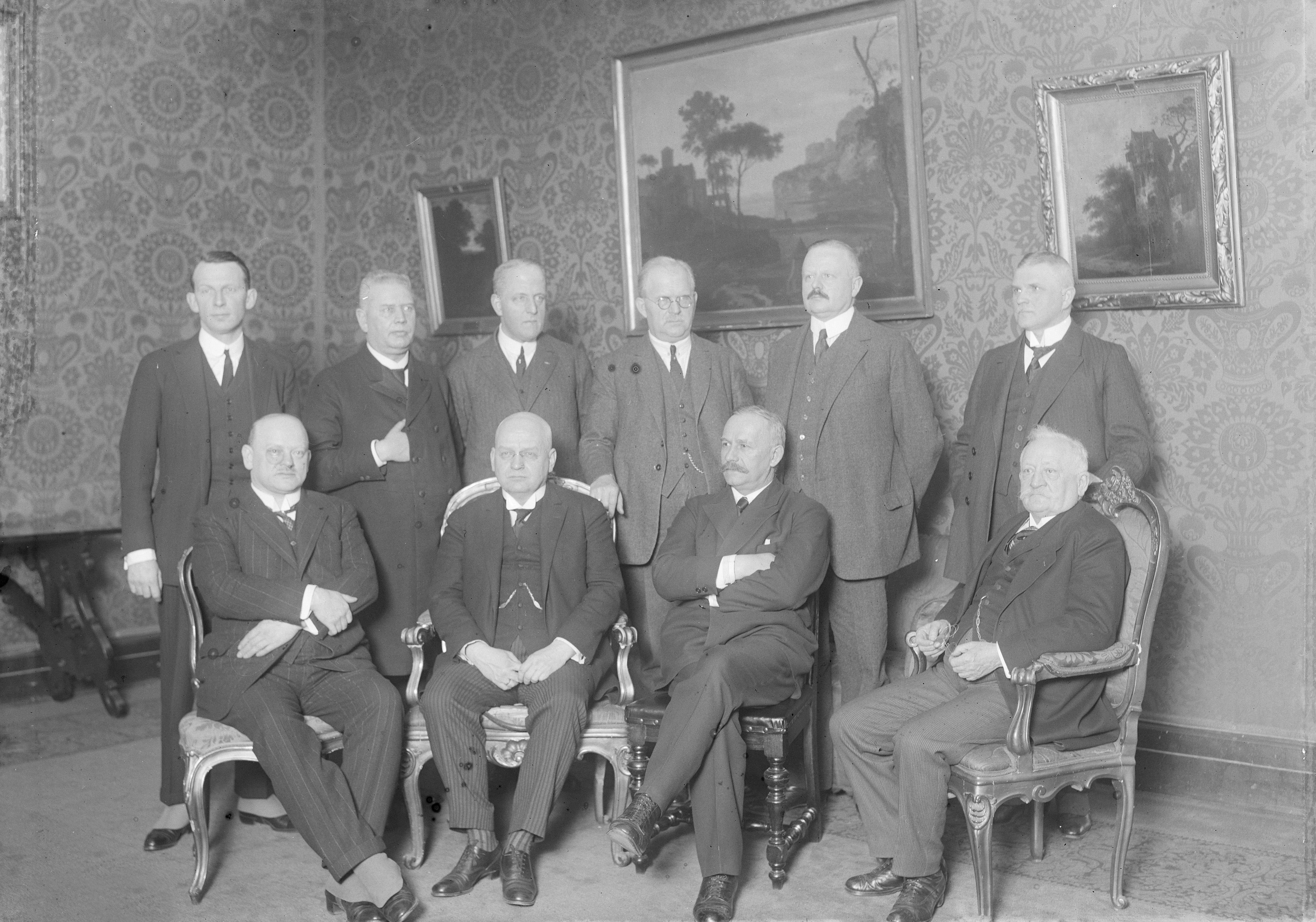
The first Luther cabinet. From left to right (first row): Gustav Stresemann, Hans Luther, Martin Schiele, Josef Frenken; (second row) Gerhard von Kanitz, Heinrich Brauns, Albert Neuhaus, Karl Stingl, Rudolf Krohne, Otto von Schlieben

Frenken was born on 27 September 1854 at Löcken near Heinsberg. He joined the Prussian civil service and was awarded a "Dr. jur." before becoming a public prosecutor at Cologne. From 1899 he worked in the Prussian Ministry of Justice and in 1913 became Ministerialdirektor in the department for criminal cases and prison administration.

From 1914 to 1916, Frenken served as Unterstaatssekretär (under secretary) at the German Ministry for Alsace-Lorraine. In 1916 he became president of the Higher Regional Court of Cologne. He retired as a judge in 1922, but in January 1925 became Reichsjustizminister (Minister of Justice) in the first cabinet of Hans Luther as he was close to (or actually a member of) the Catholic Centre Party. While in office, he was also in charge of the Ministry for the Occupied Territories. Frenken resigned on 21 November 1925, protesting the Locarno Treaties, which he had strictly opposed.

Frenken died on 10 September 1943 at Cologne.
