= First Luther cabinet =

1925–1926 cabinet of Weimar Germany

First Cabinet of Hans Luther
- 12th Cabinet of Weimar Germany
- 15 January 1925 – 5 December 1925 (until 20 January 1926 as caretaker government)
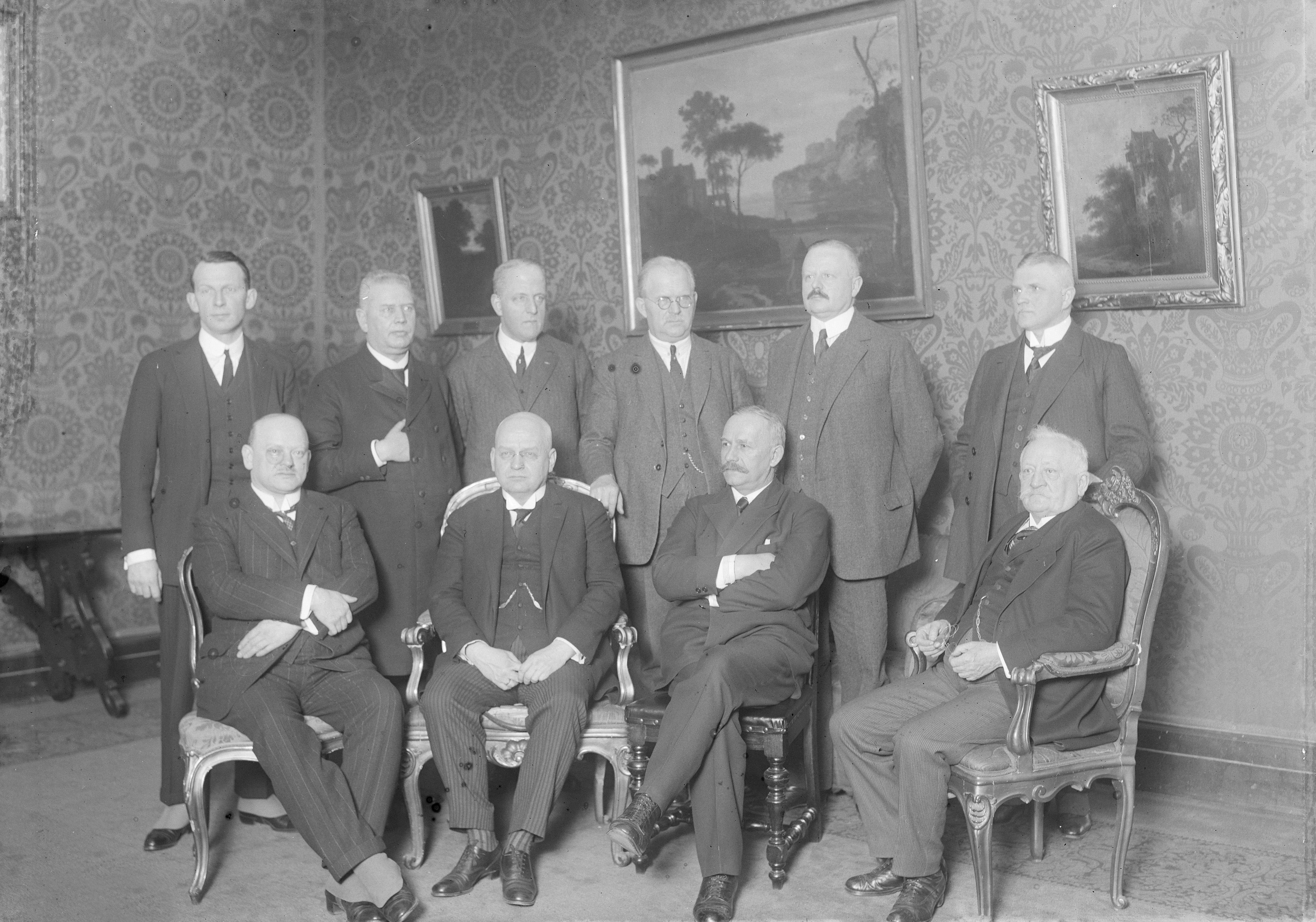
- Members of the cabinet
- Date formed: 15 January 1925
- Date dissolved: 20 January 1926 (1 year and 5 days)

People and organisations
- President: Friedrich Ebert (until 28 February 1925); Hans Luther (Acting); Walter Simons (Acting); Paul von Hindenburg (from 12 May 1925)
- Chancellor: Hans Luther
- Member parties: Centre Party; German National People's Party (until 26 October 1925); German People's Party; German Democratic Party; Bavarian People's Party
- Status in legislature: Majority coalition government (Note: Until the DNVP withdrew on 26 October); Minority coalition government (Note: After the DNVP's withdrawal on 26 October)
- Opposition parties: Communist Party; Nazi Party; German National People's Party (from 26 October 1925)

History
- Election: December 1924 federal election
- Legislature term: 3rd Reichstag of the Weimar Republic
- Predecessor: Second Marx cabinet
- Successor: Second Luther cabinet

The first Luther cabinet, headed by the politically independent Hans Luther, was the 12th democratically elected government of the Weimar Republic. It took office on 15 January 1925, replacing the second cabinet of Wilhelm Marx, which had resigned when Marx was unable to form a new coalition following the December 1924 Reichstag election. Luther's cabinet was made up of a loose coalition of five parties ranging from the German Democratic Party (DDP) on the left to the German National People's Party (DNVP) on the right.

The cabinet's primary achievement was negotiating the Locarno Treaties and then seeing them approved by the Reichstag. The main pact secured Germany's post-World War I borders in the west with the stipulation that it not use force to change them.

The DNVP, the largest parliamentary party in the coalition, withdrew from the cabinet on 26 October 1925 in protest against the Treaties. Four days after they were formally signed on 1 December, Luther resigned with his cabinet in order to try to rebuild a majority government. The cabinet remained in office in a caretaker capacity until he formed his second cabinet on 20 January 1926.

== Establishment ==
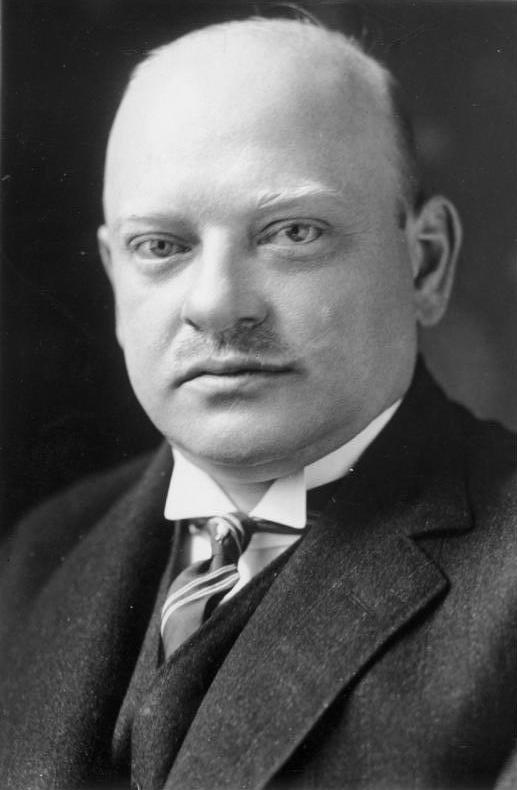
Gustav Stresemann (DVP), Minister of Foreign Affairs

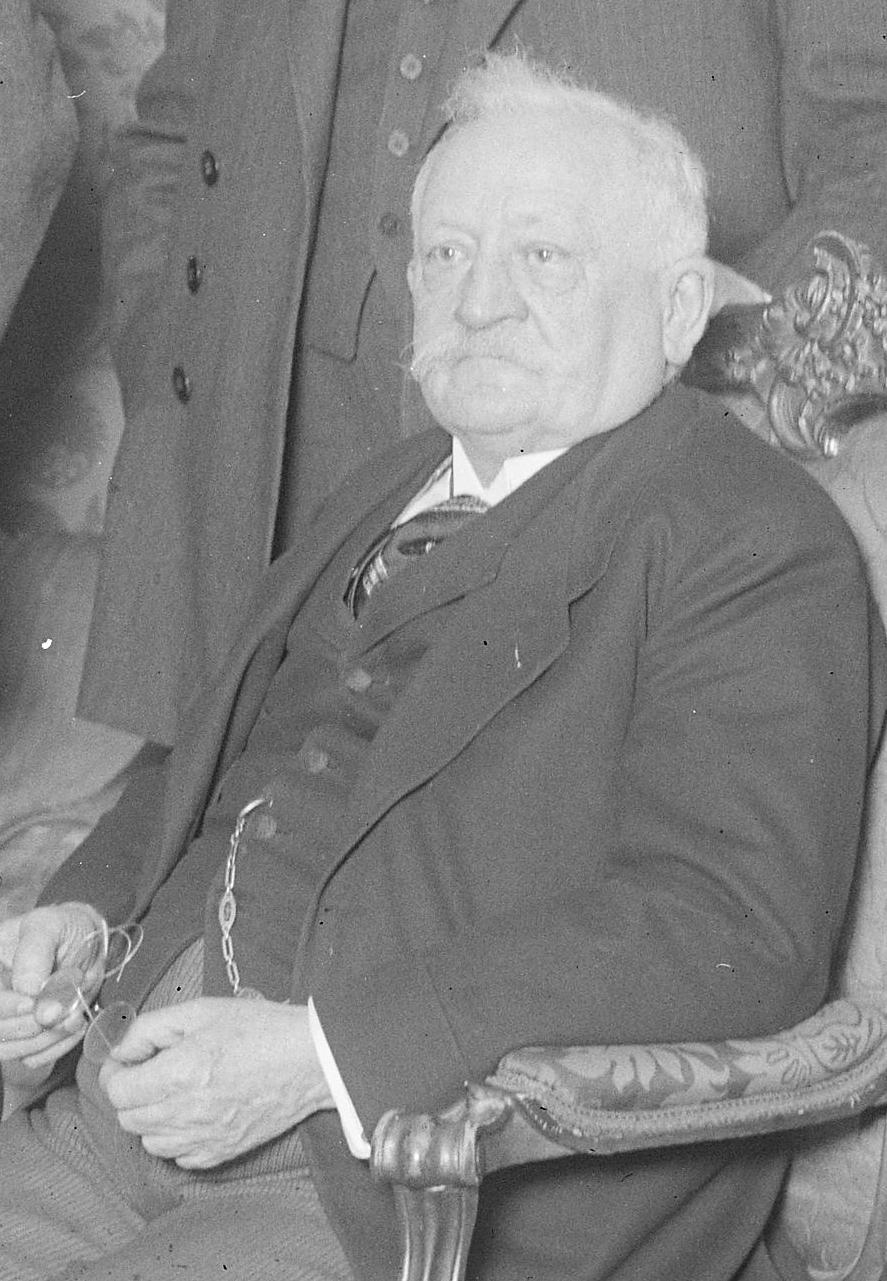
Josef Frenken (Centre), Minister of Justice

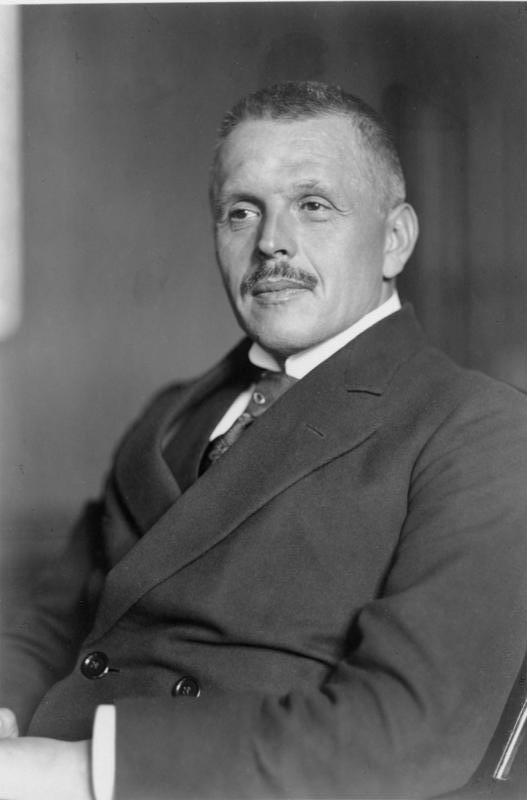
Otto Gessler (DDP), Reichswehr Minister

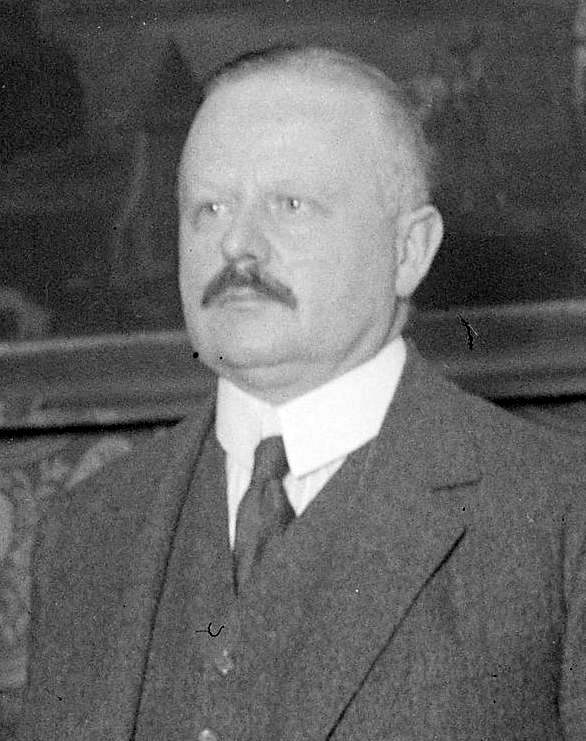
Rudolf Krohne (DVP.), Minister of Economic Affairs (from 26 October 1925) and Minister of Transport

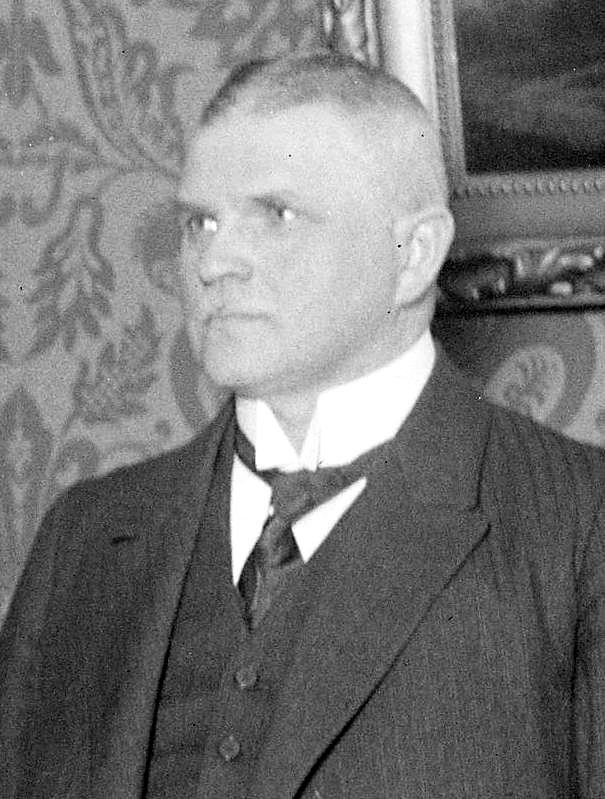
Otto von Schlieben (DNVP), Minister of Finance

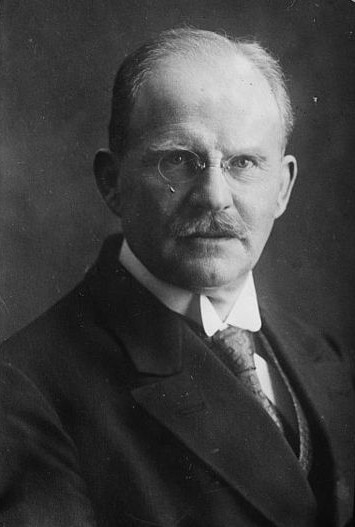
Karl Stingl (BVP), Minister of Postal Affairs

Attempts to form a new government began when the second Marx cabinet resigned on 15 December 1924. Marx had been asked by German President Friedrich Ebert to build a new coalition, but he found the goals of the parties incompatible, and including the whole spectrum from the leftist Social Democrats (SPD) to right-wing German National People's Party (DNVP) did not succeed. The refusal of the German Democratic Party (DDP) to work with the DNVP also ruled out a broad "bourgeois" coalition. As a result, Marx gave up on 9 January. Hans Luther, an independent, began talks on 10 January, but his initial attempt to form a coalition failed when the Centre Party asked for reassurance that the DNVP would accept a formal declaration of allegiance to the democratic constitution. When Luther was unable to provide one, the plans fell through.

Luther then initiated a second round of negotiations aimed at setting up an alternative to the traditional party-based cabinet. The idea was for the DNVP, Centre Party, German People's Party (DVP) and Bavarian People's Party (BVP) each to appoint a representative who would not be formally bound by party discipline. They would be joined by several technocrats, who – although nominally without party affiliation – would be vetted based on the closeness of their views to those of the political parties involved. The half way construct between a purely technocratic government and one based on a coalition of parties would, so Luther hoped, make it easier for the parties not included to support its policies in the Reichstag. Since the SPD had expressed its opposition to a bourgeois government, Luther apparently was trying to win the support of the DDP.

The Centre Party was willing to support the new cabinet only if the DDP agreed to keep Otto Gessler (DDP) in office as Reichswehr minister. Luther was able to get an agreement from the DDP's Erich Koch-Weser the next day. The issue that remained to be settled at that point was the form in which the cabinet should gain the necessary expression of support of the Reichstag. On 15 January, it became obvious that a formal vote of confidence, as preferred by the DNVP, was viewed unfavourably in the Centre Party parliamentary group. The parties then agreed to settle for a vote of acknowledgement on the government declaration. The same evening, Luther was appointed chancellor.

The complete cabinet was presented to the public on the day of the government declaration, 19 January 1925. Four parties contributed a representative: DVP (Gustav Stresemann), Centre Party (Heinrich Brauns), DNVP (Martin Schiele) and BVP (Karl Stingl). Schiele, a member of the Reichstag since 1914 and head of the DNVP parliamentary group since late 1924, was the only one among them without previous government experience. Of the four, only Stingl was not a member of the Reichstag. Two ministries were awarded to technocrats not directly associated with a party's parliamentary group: Otto Gessler at the Ministry of the Reichswehr, a DDP member but not in the Reichstag since 1924, and Gerhard von Kanitz at the Ministry of Food and Agriculture. Both had held the same offices in the previous government. The other portfolios were distributed between the coalition parties, and experts who were close to the parties were then appointed. Otto von Schlieben (DNVP) had previously headed the budget department at the Ministry of Finance, where he became minister. Albert Neuhaus (DNVP), a former head of the trade department of the Ministry of Economic Affairs who had left public service in 1920 when he refused to swear allegiance to the Weimar Constitution, became minister of Economic Affairs. The DVP nominated Rudolf Krohne, a state secretary at the Ministry of Transport, to become its minister. The Centre Party nominated Josef Frenken for Justice.

== Members ==
The members of the cabinet were as follows:

Portfolio	Minister	Took office	Left office	Party
Chancellorship	Hans Luther	15 January 1925	20 January 1926	Independent
Vice-Chancellorship	Vacant	–	–	–
Foreign Affairs	Gustav Stresemann	15 January 1925	20 January 1926	DVP
Interior	Martin Schiele	15 January 1925	26 October 1925	DNVP
Interior	Otto Gessler (acting)	26 October 1925	20 January 1926	DDP
Justice	Josef Frenken	15 January 1925	21 November 1925	Centre
Justice	Hans Luther (acting)	21 November 1925	20 January 1926	Independent
Labour	Heinrich Brauns	15 January 1925	20 January 1926	Centre
Reichswehr	Otto Gessler	15 January 1925	20 January 1926	DDP
Economic Affairs	Albert Neuhaus	15 January 1925	26 October 1925	DNVP
Economic Affairs	Rudolf Krohne (acting)	26 October 1925	20 January 1926	DVP
Finance	Otto von Schlieben	15 January 1925	26 October 1925	DNVP
Finance	Hans Luther (acting)	26 October 1925	20 January 1926	Independent
Food and Agriculture	Gerhard von Kanitz	15 January 1925	20 January 1926	Independent
Transport	Rudolf Krohne	15 January 1925	20 January 1926	DVP
Postal Affairs	Karl Stingl	15 January 1925	20 January 1926	BVP
Occupied Territories	Josef Frenken (acting)	15 January 1925	21 November 1925	Centre
Occupied Territories	Heinrich Brauns (acting)	21 November 1925	20 January 1926	Centre

The DNVP ministers resigned from the cabinet on 26 October 1925 in protest against the signing of the Locarno Treaties.

== Foreign policies ==
In foreign policy, the cabinet had two main tasks. One was to establish normal trade relations with its European neighbours following the expiration on 10 January 1925 of the clause in the Treaty of Versailles that required Germany to grant them most favoured nation trade status. The second and larger issue was settling security arrangements in Europe. It was the latter issue which eventually resulted in the resignation of the DNVP ministers.

=== Security policy and the Locarno Treaties ===
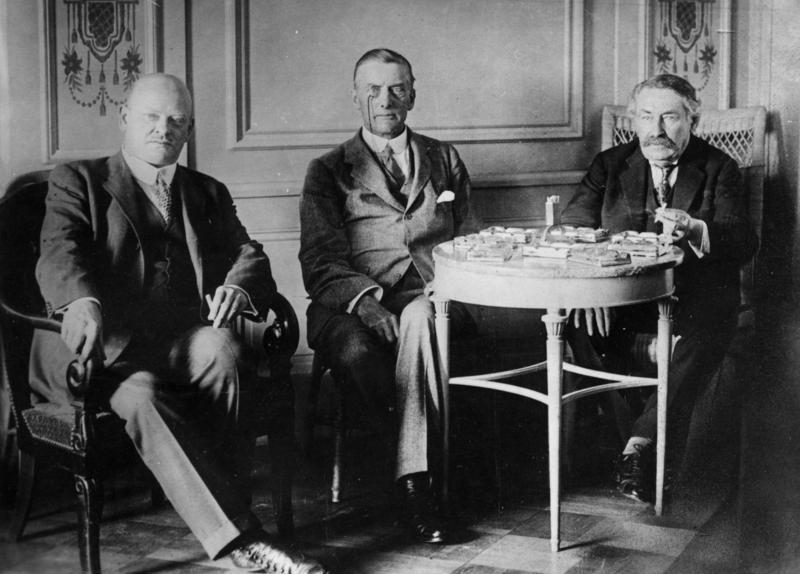
From left to right, Gustav Stresemann, Austen Chamberlain and Aristide Briand during the Locarno negotiations

In December 1924, at a meeting with French Prime Minister Édouard Herriot, British Foreign Secretary Austen Chamberlain expressed support for a separate treaty between France and Britain, outside of the wider European collective security arrangement that was sought by the League of Nations. Another problem from the German point of view was the decision by the Council of the League that, after the end of the military occupation of a territory (according to Article 213), the Council would be allowed to retain permanent observation institutions in the demilitarised zone. France was eager to pursue this and argued for its implementation in the Rhineland. The northern Rhineland zone was due to be vacated by the Allies on 10 January 1925. They refused to do so and on 5 January justified their decision in a note with vague references to German "breaches of the disarmament clauses of the Treaty of Versailles". Further instructions to Germany as to what was expected in terms of additional disarmament would follow.

As a result, Germany was forced to abandon its previous wait-and-see stance. It presented a secret memorandum on 20 January to Britain and on 9 February to France, suggesting a non-aggression pact between all countries "interested in the Rhine". It also offered a guarantee of the "current status on the Rhine" (i.e., the German-French and German-Belgian borders) and the signing of arbitration agreements with all interested parties. Luther and Foreign Minister Gustav Stresemann informed the rest of the cabinet of the full details of the note only two months later. They anticipated strong opposition from the DNVP and feared that a domestic debate would both undermine the government's position in negotiations with the Allies and threaten the government's cohesion.

During talks about the memorandum, Chamberlain demanded that Germany join the League with no conditions and as an equal partner. Although the German side agreed to a linkage between League membership and the security question, it stuck to its earlier position that as a disarmed and economically constrained country, it would require a special dispensation from Article 16 of the Covenant of the League of Nations, which forced all members to treat war on any other member as an act of aggression and respond with sanctions. More seriously, Chamberlain tried to win a German agreement that under no circumstances would they try to change the status quo on the German-Polish border through military means and accept it as permanent in the same way as the French-German border. This was steadfastly opposed in Berlin, where the cabinet insisted on leeway to change the border by peaceful means and saw the arbitration agreement proposed in the memorandum as sufficient.

By March, concerns started to surface in the DNVP about the government making too many concessions, and its parliamentary membership wrote to Stresemann indicating that they would not agree to any treaties unless the "spirit of the negotiations" changed. By throwing his personal weight behind the foreign policies, Luther was able to defuse the situation, and the DNVP members reduced their criticism to complaining about the secretive way in which the Foreign Office had acted. Luther promised greater transparency in the future and the involvement of party representatives. Stresemann said that the government would not change its stance on the Polish border and that he saw the current process leading towards a speedy withdrawal of foreign troops from Cologne and the Ruhr as well as their departure from the rest of the occupied Rhineland ahead of schedule.

At that point, the focus shifted to the disarmament issue. After the German government had sharply protested the Allied decision not to vacate the northern Rhineland and asked for an explanation, no further progress had been made. Through unofficial channels, the Reichswehr Ministry managed to gain access to some details of the report by the Military Inter-Allied Commission of Control (CMIC), but it remained unclear which of its findings served as the rationale for the refusal to withdraw. Meanwhile, with no official information available, the foreign press was starting to speculate about significant German breaches of the disarmament clauses, and indeed about secret preparations for war. When no Allied note had been received by mid-May, Stresemann strongly criticised the delay in a Reichstag speech and expressed his hope that any remaining issues the Allies might have would turn out to be minor.

On 4 June, Germany received the Allied response. It contained a surprisingly long list of German infractions, according to Stresemann, mainly "petty and pathetic" points. It also made a number of major demands on armament, organisation of the armed forces, and police or troop training that could not be reasonably derived from the Treaty of Versailles' articles. However, the northern Rhineland would be vacated as soon as all points had been cleared up. The cabinet faced a difficult choice: agree to the whole list in the interest of regaining control of the Rhineland, or offer to deal only with those points which were clearly based on Germany's obligations under the Treaty. On Stresemann's suggestion, the cabinet chose the second option and appointed a commission to negotiate with the CMIC.

On 16 June, France replied to the secret German memorandum. It agreed to negotiate a security pact, but demanded a full entry of Germany into the League and acceptance of arbitration agreements. They would be guaranteed by Great Britain, France, Italy and Belgium in the west and by all signatories of the Treaty of Versailles in the east.

Both Allied communications were made public on 19 June, causing a heated debate over Stresemann's policies. In the cabinet, Frenken, Neuhaus, von Kanitz and Schiele, plus Commander in Chief of the Army Hans von Seeckt, refused to support another voluntary confirmation of the western borders forced on Germany at Versailles. Stresemann refused to conduct further negotiations in such a way that they must fail, as suggested by Frenken. Luther supported his foreign minister, and the cabinet agreed on further talks with the Allies on the issues.

Tensions between Stresemann and Luther emerged when the Chancellor claimed that Stresemann had informed him about the secret memorandum and the details of German policy on the security issue only in mid-February. Stresemann maintained that he had always kept him fully informed.

On 20 July, the cabinet's reply to the French note was delivered. Despite taking a critical stance towards the French position on arbitration agreements and confirming German reservations about Article 16 of the Covenant of the League of Nations, it found a positive response in Paris. France replied on 24 August, indicating that the exchange of notes could now be replaced with direct talks. In late August, both sides agreed on a meeting of judicial experts to prepare for an intergovernmental conference.

In September, Germany received an invitation to the conference of foreign ministers. Schiele, for the DNVP, tried to convince Luther to send only Stresemann so as to keep the person of the Chancellor untainted by association with the outcome of the conference. Luther, however, insisted on going himself to add his weight to the German delegation. Schiele held firm on his second demand that the government's reply to the invitation should officially protest the Allied position assigning sole responsibility for World War I to Germany. Stresemann opposed the idea, fearing the Allied reaction to such a provocation. Nevertheless, a memorandum was added to the German response rejecting the war guilt claim.

On 2 October, the cabinet agreed on the delegation's guidelines: change of the French-British draft discussed at the London expert meeting to make clear that the guarantee of the western border would mean only a renunciation of offensive war and not a waiver of claims to German territory (i.e., Alsace–Lorraine and Eupen-Malmedy); refusal of a French guarantee of the eastern arbitration treaties; interpretation of Article 16 in a way that took account of German reservations; changes to military rule in the Rhineland and a reduction in the duration of the occupation of the second and third zone of the Rhineland.

At the Locarno conference (5–16 October), Stresemann and Luther were able to achieve their goals to a sufficient degree with regard to Article 16, the form of the western security arrangement (also known as the Rhine Pact and the arbitration conventions). No progress was made on the duration of the occupation. No clear reply came from Chamberlain and Aristide Briand on German concerns about the creation of permanent observer institutions in the demilitarised zone: the relevant article's wording was not final and it might never be implemented. No assurances were given by the Allies at the conference regarding the changes to the occupation regime desired by the Germans. On the issue of German infractions of the disarmament agreement, it was agreed that Germany would inform the Allies about the measures it had taken. The conference of Allied ambassadors would then fix a date for withdrawal from the Cologne area and express a firm expectation that Germany would comply with all the demands of the note of 5 January not already fulfilled in the short term.

The ministers who remained in Berlin during the conference were then informed about the results, and a majority argued that the treaties should not be initialled, only the less binding protocols. Stresemann and Luther, however, refused and on 16 October fully agreed to the results of the negotiations.

When they returned to Berlin, they managed to convince the rest of the cabinet, which met with President Paul von Hindenburg (see below), of the necessity of their actions. On 22 October, the cabinet agreed unanimously to bring the treaties into force. Yet within hours, the DNVP parliamentary membership criticised the results of Locarno and declared that it would not be able to support any treaty that "sacrificed German territory or people". Luther and Schiele tried to calm the waves by way of a government declaration stating that Article 1 of the treaty implied only a renunciation of war, not of the right of self-determination or peaceful changes to the borders. However, since the note was treated confidentially and not transmitted to the Allies as demanded by the DNVP, its Reichstag group voted to leave the coalition on 25 October.

As a result, Schiele, Schlieben and Neuhaus all resigned their posts. The remaining ministers agreed that the Reichstag should not be dissolved and that the government should remain in office, as that would be the only way of getting the parliament's approval for the treaties in time for their formal signing on 1 December. Hindenburg agreed to this as well as to Luther's suggestion to have the vacant portfolios be taken over by existing members of the cabinet on a caretaker basis. Even the DNVP announced that it would refrain from presenting a motion of no confidence.

Meanwhile, the French government agreed to a number of changes to the occupation regime in the Rhineland, and in mid-November officially informed the German government. Although less than perfectly satisfied with the results, the cabinet agreed that the drawbacks were not sufficient to sink the treaties on their account. It was also viewed as a first step towards the desired "hollowing out" of the Treaty of Versailles.

Disarmament issues were dealt with in a German-Allied exchange of views that ended in mid-November with a mutually satisfying agreement: police forces in barracks would be limited to 32,000, the position of army commander-in-chief was changed to make the senior commanders directly responsible to the Reichswehr minister and the chief himself a councillor and deputy to the minister. Germany also agreed to dissolve paramilitary associations. A note from the conference of Allied ambassadors declared itself satisfied with the results and announced the withdrawal from the first Rhineland zone for December 1925 and January 1926. On 17 November, the cabinet decided to put the Locarno treaties to a Reichstag vote. Although strongly opposed by the DNVP, they passed with a large majority on 27 November and were signed by Hindenburg a day later.

== Domestic policies ==
Although the most crucial issues facing the cabinet were in the field of foreign policy, it also had a lasting impact on domestic policies. The government notably left its mark on tax law, social law, and the financial relations between the federal government, states and municipalities. It also had to deal with the sudden death of the head of state.

=== Death of Friedrich Ebert and presidential election ===
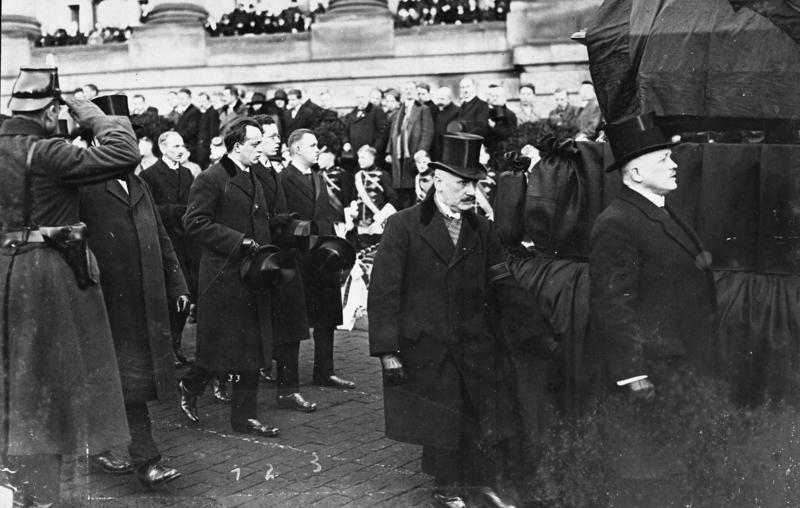
Funeral procession for Friedrich Ebert

President Ebert fell acutely ill in mid-February 1925 and died on 28 February. In accordance with Article 51 of the constitution, Luther took over the responsibilities of the head of state when Ebert fell ill. Government work was disrupted, first as the memorial events for Ebert had to be organized, then as debates dragged on over the details of the presidential election and the question of who would substitute for Ebert until his successor could be elected. The parliamentary groups became increasingly engaged in the election campaign, which put a burden on the work of the cabinet.

After protests by the SPD and DDP against Luther's double role as chancellor and acting president, he agreed to have the Reichstag decide the issue. A law of 10 March appointed Walter Simons, president of the Reichsgericht, Germany's highest court, as acting head of state.

During the election campaign, Luther was at pains to emphasize the neutrality of the government but noted that he personally would not refrain from influencing the choice of candidates and working to prevent damage to the interests of the German state. He was particularly worried about Paul von Hindenburg, whose decision to run had caused very critical reactions in the foreign press. Luther tried to convince Simons to approach Hindenburg and Wilhelm Marx, the two main candidates in the second round of voting, and ask them to withdraw from the running in Simons' favour. Simons refused, noting that Hindenburg had once publicly called him a traitor to the fatherland and would be unlikely to withdraw.

Hindenburg was elected, and in subsequent talks between the government and the president-elect, he expressed some reservations about the cabinet's policies but indicated his desire to govern "only constitutionally". He indicated that he had no plans to make use of his powers to dismiss the chancellor and agreed to the current cabinet staying in office with no personnel changes.

== Resignation ==
After the DNVP pulled out of the cabinet, Luther had said that his government would resign after the Locarno Treaties were signed so that a new cabinet could be formed that had a workable majority. The cabinet duly resigned on 5 December 1925 and was asked by President Hindenburg to remain in office as caretakers until a new government could be formed. On 13 January 1926, Hindenburg formally asked Luther to form another cabinet, which he had ready on 20 January.
