= Reich Ministry of Food and Agriculture =

Agriculture ministry of Germany (1919–1945)

- Reichsministerium für Ernährung und Landwirtschaft

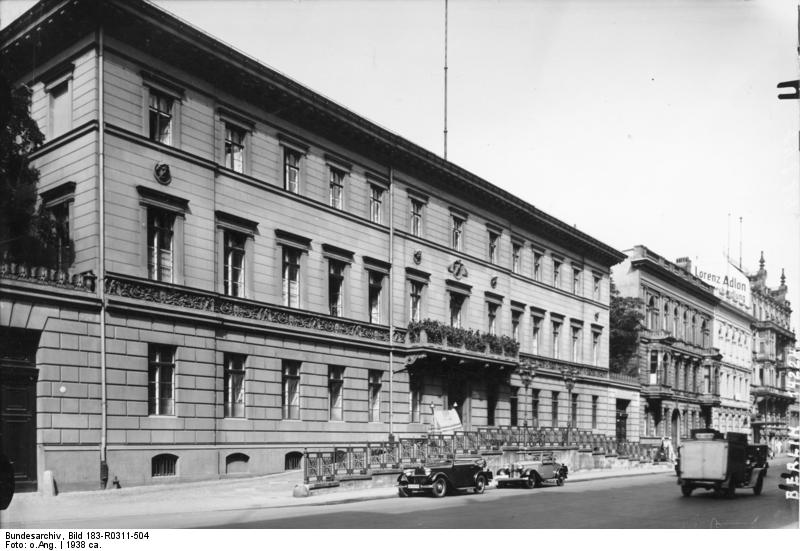
- The building of the Reich Ministry of Food and Agriculture on Wilhelmstrasse, during the Nazi era. After the interior was destroyed in World War II, the former palace, which had been earmarked for reconstruction in 1956, was demolished by the East Berlin municipal administration in 1960/62.

Agency overview
- Formed: March 1919
- Dissolved: 23 May 1945
- Jurisdiction: Government of the Weimar Republic (until 1934); Government of Nazi Germany (from 1934)
- Minister responsible: See list

The Reich Ministry of Food and Agriculture (German: Reichsministerium für Ernährung und Landwirtschaft, abbreviated RMEL) was responsible for the agricultural policy of Germany during the Weimar Republic from 1919 to 1933 and during the Nazi dictatorship of the Third Reich from 1933 to 1945. It was headed by a Reichsminister under whom a state secretary served. On 1 January 1935, the ministry merged with the Prussian Ministry of Agriculture, Domains and Forests, founded in 1879. Until 1938 and the Anschluss with Austria, it was called the "Reich and Prussian Ministry of Food and Agriculture". After the end of National Socialism in 1945 and of the Allied occupation of Germany, the Federal Ministry of Food and Agriculture was established in 1949 as a successor in the Federal Republic of Germany (West Germany).

== History ==
In March 1919, the Reich Office of Food (Reichsernährungsamt) established the Reich Ministry of Food. It was combined with the Reich Ministry of Economics in September 1919 and re-founded during the Kapp Putsch in March 1920 under the name Reich Ministry of Food and Agriculture. In the same year, the ministry moved into the Palace of Prince Alexander and Prince George at 72 Wilhelmstrasse in Berlin. From 1924, four large-format paintings by August Weber were on loan in the building. Since 1945 they have been considered lost.

After the Nazis seized power on 30 January 1933, the ministry was initially led by Alfred Hugenberg. Coerced into resignation in June 1933, Hugenburg was succeeded by Kurt Schmitt (minister of economics) and Walther Darré (minister of food and agriculture). The latter took over the management of the Reich Ministry of Food and Agriculture as Reich Farmers' Leader (Reichsbauernführer) on 30 June 1933. In this function he was also responsible for the Reichsnährstand (loosely, Reich Bureau of Food and Nutrition), which had been created for the "co-ordination" (Gleichschaltung) of German agriculture. Darré simultaneously headed the Office for Agricultural Policy (from 1936, Reich Office for Agricultural Policy; from 1942, Reich Office for Rural Inhabitants), which belonged to the party's official apparatus and was responsible for the management and supervision of the Reich Bureau of Food and Nutrition.

The RMEL essentially took over the state's oversight of the Reichsnährstand organization. As a result, individual areas of responsibility were gradually transferred to other National Socialist authorities. In 1934, for example, the Reich Forestry Office (Reichsforstamt), under the leadership of Hermann Göring, was created as the supreme Reich authority for forestry and hunting, the timber industry, nature conservation and the preservation of natural monuments. The Reich Forestry Office was in turn united on 1 January 1935 with the Prussian State Forestry Office. Goring's deputy and the de facto head of German Forestry was Walter von Keudell, and then from 1937 Friedrich Alpers. Furthermore, in 1934 and 1935, the agricultural vocational and technical school system was transferred to the Reich Ministry of Science, Education and Culture, and veterinary medicine was transferred to the Reich Ministry of the Interior. On 22 September 1938, by decree of the Reich minister, all research institutes in the fisheries sector were consolidated in the Reich Institute for Fisheries.

== Reich ministers ==
No.	Portrait	Name (born–died)	Term of office			Political party	Government	Ref.
No.	Portrait	Name (born–died)	Took office	Left office	Time in office	Political party	Government	Ref.
1	Robert Schmidt	Robert Schmidt (1864–1943)	13 February 1919	26 March 1920	1 year, 42 days	SPD	Scheidemann; Bauer	
2	Andreas Hermes	Andreas Hermes (1878–1964)	27 March 1920	10 March 1922	1 year, 348 days	Centre	Müller I Fehrenbach; Wirth I–II	
3	Anton Fehr	Anton Fehr (1881–1954)	31 March 1922	21 November 1922	256 days	BB	Wirth II	
4	Karl Müller	Karl Müller (1884–1964)	22 November 1922	25 November 1922	4 days	Centre	Cuno	
5	Hans Luther	Hans Luther (1879–1962)	1 December 1922	4 October 1923	317 days	Independent	Cuno; Stresemann I	
6	Gerhard Graf von Kanitz	Gerhard Graf von Kanitz (1885–1949)	6 October 1923	5 December 1925	2 years, 62 days	Independent	Stresemann I Marx I Stresemann II; Marx II; Luther I	
7	Heinrich Haslinde	Heinrich Haslinde (1881–1958)	20 January 1926	17 December 1926	331 days	Centre	Luther II; Marx III	
8	Martin Schiele	Martin Schiele (1870–1939)	28 January 1927	12 June 1928	1 year, 136 days	DNVP	Luther II; Marx IV	
9	Hermann Dietrich	Hermann Dietrich (1879–1954)	28 June 1928	27 March 1930	1 year, 272 days	DDP	Luther II; Müller II	
(8)		Martin Schiele (1870–1939)	30 March 1930	30 May 1932	2 years, 61 days	DNVP	Brüning I–II	
(8)		Martin Schiele (1870–1939)	30 March 1930	30 May 1932	2 years, 61 days	CNBL	Brüning I–II	
10	Magnus Freiherr von Braun	Magnus Freiherr von Braun (1878–1972)	1 June 1932	28 January 1933	241 days	DNVP	Papen; Schleicher	
11	Alfred Hugenberg	Alfred Hugenberg (1865–1951)	30 January 1933	29 June 1933	150 days	DNVP	Hitler	
12	Richard Walther Darré	Richard Walther Darré (1895–1953)	30 June 1933	23 May 1942 (On leave until 6 April 1944)	8 years, 327 days	NSDAP	Hitler	
–		Herbert Backe (1896–1947)	23 May 1942	6 April 1944	1 year, 319 days	NSDAP	Hitler	
13		Herbert Backe (1896–1947)	6 April 1944	23 May 1945	1 year, 47 days	NSDAP	Hitler; Goebbels; Schwerin von Krosigk	

== State secretaries ==
Name	Appointed	End of Term	Political Party
Ludwig Huber	1920	1922	Independent
Carl Heinrici	1922	1923	Independent
Fred Hagedorn	1923	1926	Independent
Erich Hoffmann	1926	1929	Independent
Hermann Heukamp	1929	1932	Independent
Fritz Mussehl	1932	1933	Independent
Hans Joachim von Rohr	1933	1933	DNVP
Herbert Backe	1933	1944	NSDAP
Werner Willikens	1934	1945	NSDAP
Hans-Joachim Riecke	1944	1945	NSDAP
