= Krohne =

Krohne is a surname. Notable people with the surname include:

- Gaudentia Krohne (born 1972), Namibian politician
- Johanne Krohne, birth name of Johanne Schjørring (1836–1910), Danish author
- Rogier Krohne (born 1986), Dutch football player
- Rudolf Krohne (1876–1953), German jurist and politician
