= Second Luther cabinet =

1926 cabinet of Weimar Germany

Second Cabinet of Hans Luther
- 13th Cabinet of Weimar Germany
- 20 January 1926 – 12 May 1926 (until 17 May 1926 as caretaker government)
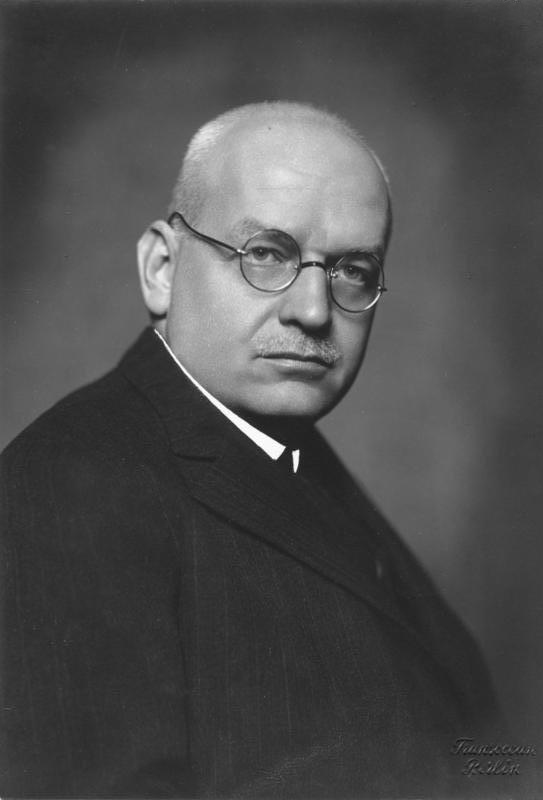
- Chancellor Hans Luther
- Date formed: 20 January 1926
- Date dissolved: 17 May 1926 (3 months and 27 days)

People and organisations
- President: Paul von Hindenburg
- Chancellor: Hans Luther (until 12 May 1926); Otto Gessler (acting from 12 May 1926)
- Member parties: Centre Party; German People's Party; German Democratic Party; Bavarian People's Party
- Status in legislature: Minority coalition government
- Opposition parties: German National People's Party; Communist Party; Nazi Party

History
- Election: December 1924 federal election
- Legislature term: 3rd Reichstag of the Weimar Republic
- Predecessor: First Luther cabinet
- Successor: Third Marx cabinet

The second Luther cabinet, headed by the independent Hans Luther, was the 13th democratically elected government of the Weimar Republic. On 20 January 1926, it replaced the first Luther cabinet, which had resigned on 5 December 1925 following the withdrawal of the German National People's Party (DNVP) from the coalition in protest against the government's support of the Locarno Treaties. Luther had wanted to build a more stable majority coalition but had to settle for a second minority government with the same parties as his first cabinet, but without the DNVP.

The short-lived cabinet attempted to deal with a growing economic crisis and rapidly rising unemployment by implementing measures to stimulate the economy. It faced strongly conflicting viewpoints when a referendum to expropriate the dynastic properties of the former German Empire's ruling houses was initiated. The cabinet fell after it backed a decree that allowed a trade flag with the Empire's colours to fly in certain mostly overseas locations. The Reichstag passed a motion of censure against Luther that led to the cabinet's resignation on 12 May 1926.

Luther refused to remain in office, but the rest of the cabinet stayed on as a caretaker government under the leadership of Otto Gessler until 17 May, when Wilhelm Marx of the Centre Party formed a new government. It was virtually unchanged from the second Luther cabinet except for the departure of Luther.

== Establishment ==
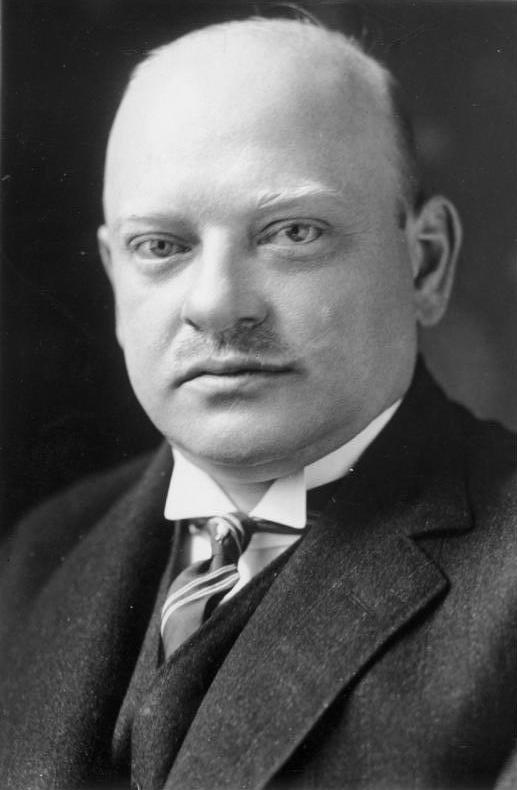
Gustav Stresemann, Minister of Foreign Affairs

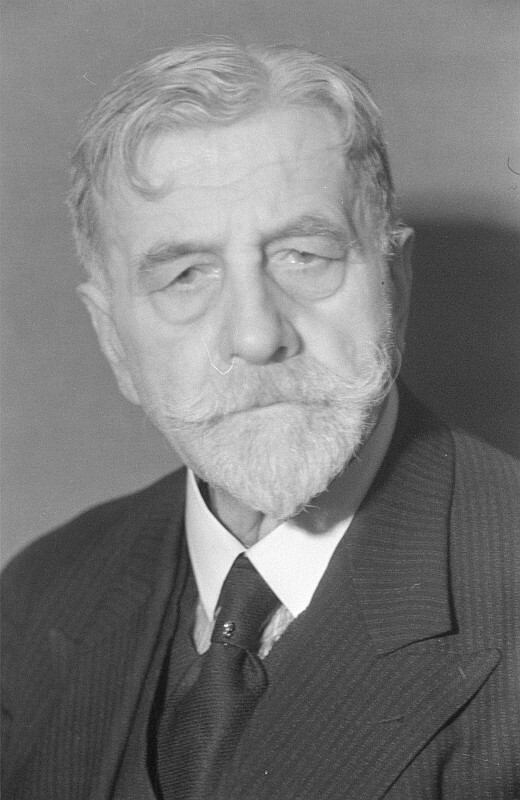
Wilhelm Külz, Interior Minister

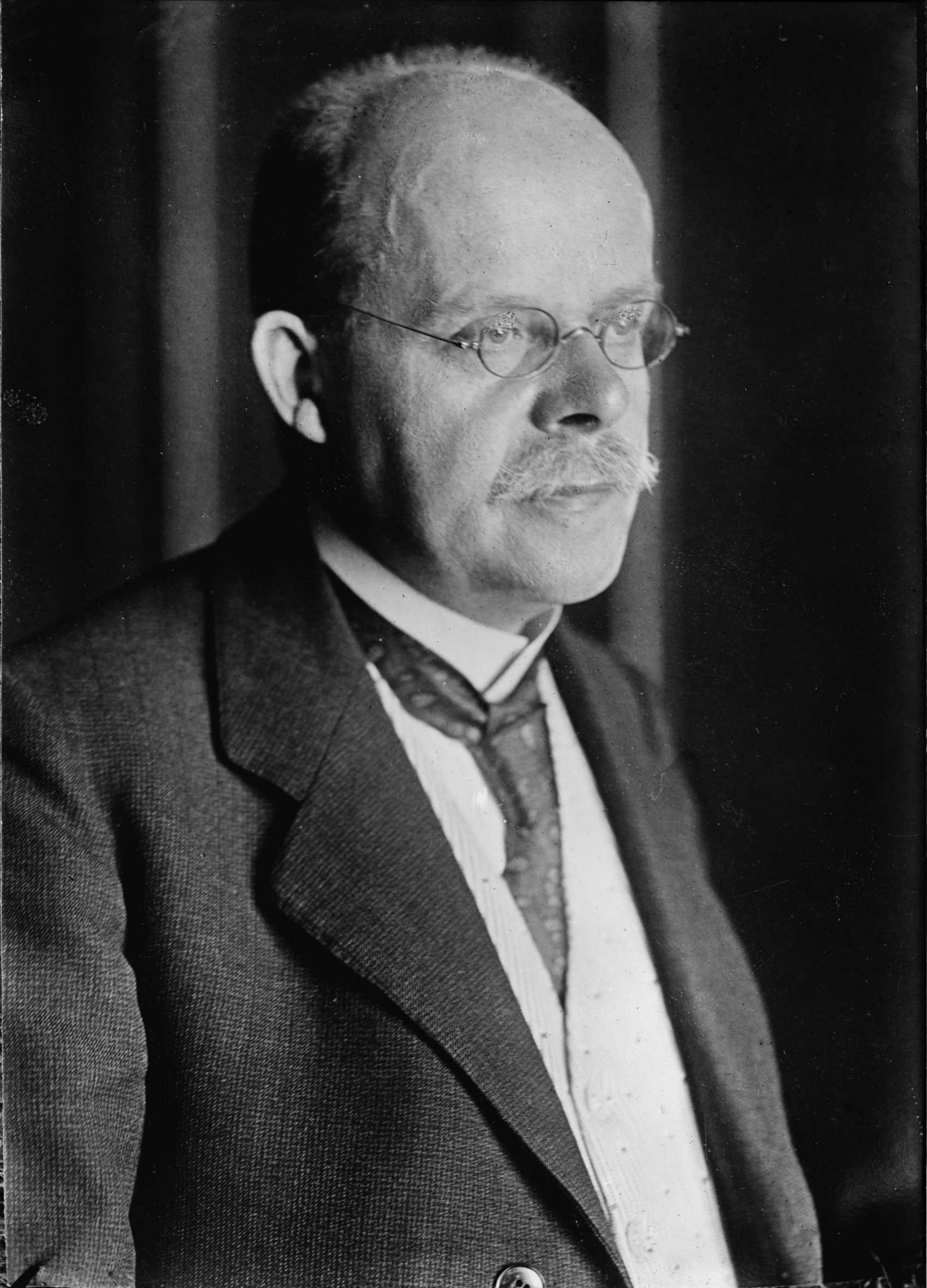
Wilhelm Marx, Justice Minister

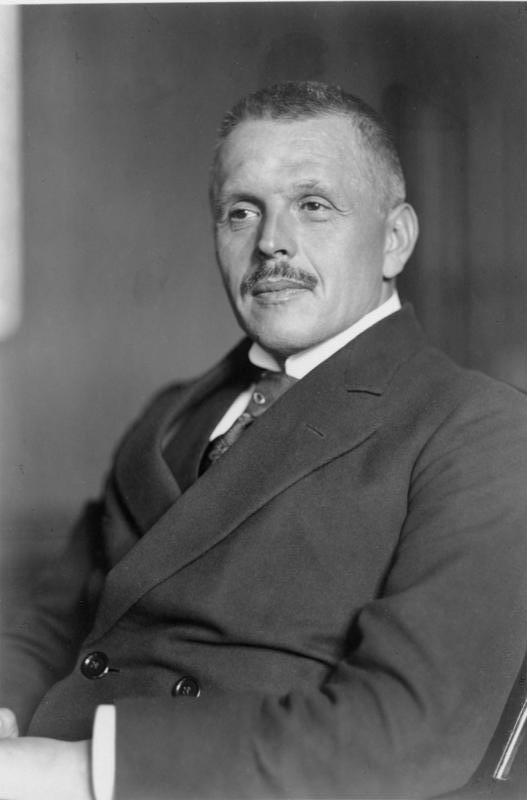
Otto Gessler, Reichswehr Minister

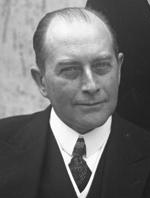
Julius Curtius, Minister of Economic Affairs

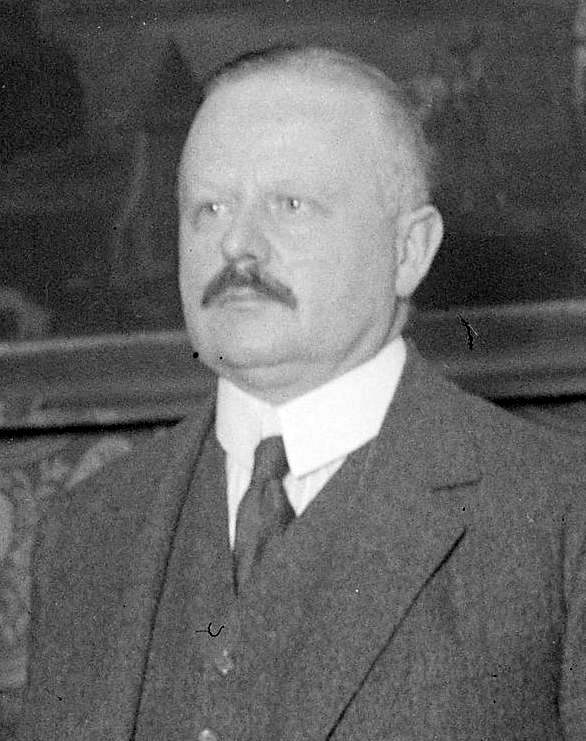
Rudolf Krohne, Minister of Transport

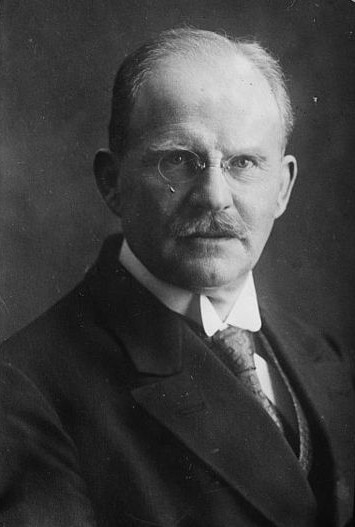
Karl Stingl, Minister of Postal Affairs

Talks over the formation of a new government began soon after the German National People's Party (DNVP) left the governing coalition in late October 1925 in protest against the Locarno Treaties – territorial settlements of post-World War I borders – which the Luther government had negotiated. On 5 November, representatives of the Centre Party, German Democratic Party (DDP) and Social Democratic Party of Germany (SPD) met and discussed a grand coalition that would stretch from the German People's Party (DVP) on the right to SPD on the left. Nothing came of the talks because the SPD insisted on calling new Reichstag elections, and neither the SPD nor the DVP was willing to commit itself fully to such a coalition. On 7 December, two days after Luther resigned as chancellor, President Paul von Hindenburg intervened, calling on the parties to speedily agree on a new government and hinting that, given the economic difficulties of the winter, he would welcome a grand coalition. The Centre Party, DDP and DVP agreed, but the SPD presented a list of social and economic policy demands as a precondition. After it was discussed by the President with the other parties, Erich Koch-Weser (DDP) was asked on 14 December to form a cabinet based on a grand coalition. Koch-Weser gave up after three days, telling Hindenburg that despite a large degree of flexibility on the part of the DVP, the SPD was not willing to compromise. Another attempt by Hindenburg in early January also failed due to the differences between the SPD and DVP on social policies.

Hindenburg then asked acting Chancellor Hans Luther, an independent, to try to form a new cabinet based on the parties of the political centre. Luther, although seeming disinterested according to Koch-Weser, won approval from the DDP, Centre Party and Bavarian People's Party (BVP) in talks that took place over the next six days. Disagreements then emerged on the distribution of the cabinet posts. The BVP refused to accept Koch-Weser as minister of the Interior, arguing he was too much in favour of a unitary rather than a federal state. On 19 January, Hindenburg called on the party leaders to put the interests of the fatherland above their doubts and send him a list of ministers. Luther was able to do so after the DDP agreed to Koch-Weser remaining out of the cabinet and to being represented instead by Wilhelm Külz (Interior) and Peter Reinhold (Finance). Gustav Stresemann (DVP, Foreign Affairs), Heinrich Brauns (Centre, Labour), Otto Gessler (Reichswehr, DDP), Karl Stingl (BVP, Postal Affairs) and Rudolf Krohne (DVP, Transport) all kept their portfolios. The other new ministers were Wilhelm Marx, chairman of the Centre Party at Justice, DVP Reichstag member Julius Curtius (DVP, Economic Affairs) and Heinrich Haslinde (Centre, Food and Agriculture).

== Members ==
The members of the cabinet were as follows:

Portfolio	Minister	Took office	Left office	Party
Chancellorship	Hans Luther	20 January 1926	12 May 1926	Independent
Chancellorship	Otto Gessler (acting)	12 May 1926	17 May 1926	DDP
Vice-Chancellorship	Vacant	–	–	–
Foreign Affairs	Gustav Stresemann	20 January 1926	17 May 1926	DVP
Interior	Wilhelm Külz	20 January 1926	17 May 1926	DDP
Justice	Wilhelm Marx	20 January 1926	17 May 1926	Centre
Labour	Heinrich Brauns	20 January 1926	17 May 1926	Centre
Reichswehr	Otto Gessler	20 January 1926	17 May 1926	DDP
Economic Affairs	Julius Curtius	20 January 1926	17 May 1926	DVP
Finance	Peter Reinhold	20 January 1926	17 May 1926	DDP
Food and Agriculture	Heinrich Haslinde	20 January 1926	17 May 1926	Centre
Transport	Rudolf Krohne	20 January 1926	17 May 1926	DVP
Postal Affairs	Karl Stingl	20 January 1926	17 May 1926	BVP
Occupied Territories	Wilhelm Marx (acting)	20 January 1926	17 May 1926	Centre

== Domestic policies ==
=== Economic crisis ===
In the winter of 1925/6, the economic situation deteriorated markedly. Consumption declined, as did the utilisation of industrial capacity. Unemployment shot up from 673,000 in early December to 2 million by the start of February. One of the first acts of the new cabinet after the Reichstag had narrowly expressed its confidence in it was to try to stimulate the economy. Its attempts were not very durable as other issues soon took up an increasing share of the cabinet's attention, including the expropriation issue, the flag question and a debate over legal sanctions against duelling.

Luther and Finance Minister Peter Reinhold agreed that tax cuts and other measures to stimulate the economy, such as allowing money from the unemployment fund to be used, were urgently needed. Reinhold suggested a reduction of the value-added tax as well as of the merger tax and the stock exchange tax. He argued that the measures were only possible if the Reichstag was prevented from voting for extra expenditures without ensuring offsetting revenues. A change in budget law to make that possible was not able to win approval, and the coalition parties agreed only that decisions having a considerable fiscal impact were to be discussed between the parties and with the cabinet before being proposed.

Hans Luther dropped his ultra economic conservatism position, and began to support left economics. Besides the tax cuts, the budget of Reinhold is considered to be corporatist.

Protests by winegrowers, at times violent, resulted in a change in the tax law before it was passed in late March. It abolished the wine tax at the cost of limiting the cut in the value-added tax to 0.25 percentage points (from 1% to 0.75%, rather than to the 0.5% / 0.6% originally planned).

Other measures, including a state guarantee of exports to the Soviet Union totalling 300 million Reichsmarks, were finally settled in July 1926. To boost demand, the cabinet decided to provide intermediate credit of 200 million Reichsmarks to housing construction in order to ameliorate the nationwide shortage of 600,000 housing units. A 100 million Reichsmark loan was given to the national railway system, the Deutsche Reichsbahn. It used the funds to place orders with the steel, wood and quarrying industries. The expenditures were all initial steps towards the large-scale make-work programs begun by the Marx cabinet later that year.

=== Expropriation of the princes ===
Besides the state of the economy, the most debated domestic issue of the first half of 1926 was the question of compensation for the former ruling houses of Germany. In 1925, the Reichsgericht, Germany's highest court, had declared the expropriation of the House of Saxe-Coburg and Gotha of July 1919 to be unconstitutional and annulled it. In reaction, draft bills had been presented in the Reichstag by the Communist Party (KPD) requesting complete expropriation without compensation. Other proposals gave the states the right to settle the issue with the former noble houses and barred recourse to the courts.

A major conflict erupted in spring 1926 when a referendum on expropriation without compensation was initiated by the KPD and SPD. Before the referendum, representatives of the coalition parties tried to forestall it by offering the SPD an alternative compromise law. It called for a special court in which the conflicts between noble houses and state governments could be addressed. It also included the possibility of declaring a substantial share of the princes' assets to be government property. Both the SPD and the nationalist German National People's Party (DNVP) were unwilling to accept the compromise, and talks on the issue ceased on 28 April. The referendum initiated by the KPD and SPD took place on 20 June, after the Luther cabinet was out of office. Although the vast majority of participating voters voted yes, it failed to achieve the required absolute majority of those entitled to vote and therefore failed.

=== Flag decree ===
In early May 1926, Luther secured cabinet approval of a change in the flag law. Members of the Hamburg senate had pointed out to him that German minorities in many Latin American countries, for sentimental reasons, accepted only the black-white-red flag of the former German Empire as the symbol of Germany and often came into conflict with the representatives of the foreign service over the matter. To improve the ties between the expatriate groups and Germany, Luther had suggested in late April the introduction of the black-white-red trade flag (approved by the Weimar Constitution) as a secondary flag at German embassies in addition to the official black-red-gold flag. Massive protests by the parliamentary groups of the Centre Party, SPD and DDP forced him to change the decree so that it would apply only at consular institutions in European ports and in non-European locations. The decree was signed by Hindenburg on 5 May, resulting in the SPD announcing its intention to present a no-confidence vote in the Reichstag against the cabinet. The DDP also demanded that the decree be withdrawn, but then seemed to settle for a formal confirmation by the President that the official colours of black-red-gold were not to be questioned.

Hindenburg wrote a letter to Luther in which he confirmed his intention to deal with the flag issue on the basis of the constitution. The DDP was somewhat satisfied but expressed its continued mistrust of Luther. Although the cabinet and the parliamentary groups of the other parties warned against pursuing this issue too far, which could easily lead to the dissolution of the Reichstag or to a presidential crisis, the DDP demanded: "personnel change" (i.e. a voluntary resignation by Luther) and a suspension of the flag decree. When the latter was refused by the cabinet, the DDP presented a vote of reprobation directed against the Chancellor in the Reichstag.

Luther had announced in the Reichstag that the decree would be implemented at the latest by the end of July 1926, but that the cabinet would be ready to revoke it if the Parliament and President had found another compromise solution by then. On 12 May, the vote of no confidence initiated by the SPD was rejected in the Reichstag, but the DDP's reprobation vote was accepted with a large majority. Luther decided to resign immediately and refused pleas from the cabinet and Hindenburg to stay on as head of a caretaker government.

== Resignation ==
The cabinet resigned formally the next day, 13 May 1926. To ensure continuity of government, Hindenburg appointed Reichswehr Minister Otto Gessler of the DDP as caretaker chancellor until a new cabinet could be formed. On 17 May, the third cabinet of Wilhelm Marx, virtually unchanged from the second Luther cabinet except for the departure of Luther, took office.
