= Higher Regional Court of Cologne =

German Higher Regional Court

- Oberlandesgericht Köln
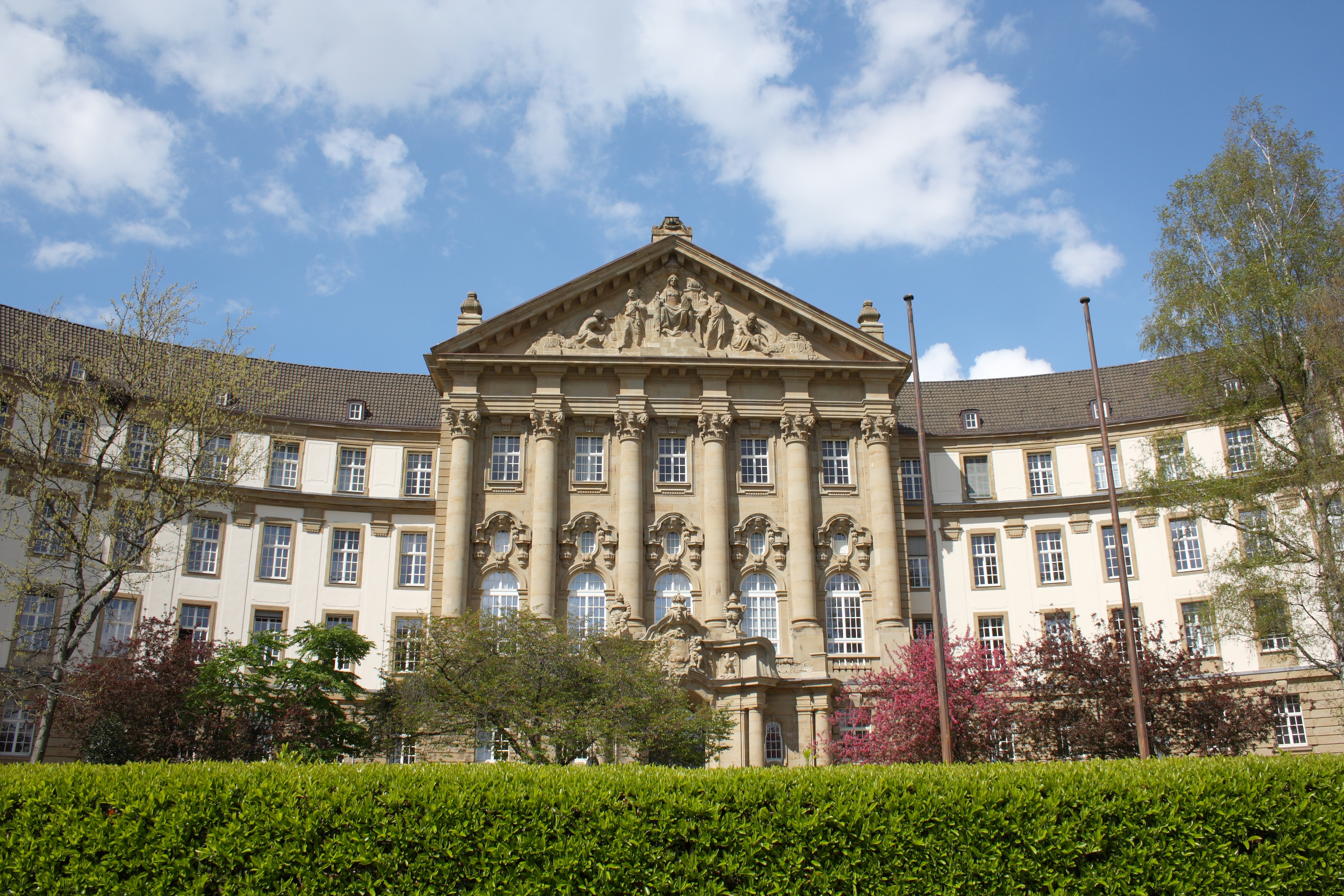
- Higher Regional Court of Cologne building, view from Reichenspergerplatz
- 50°57′16.3″N 6°57′45.2″E
- Established: 27 January 1877
- Location: Reichenspergerplatz 1, Cologne
- Coordinates: 50°57′16.3″N 6°57′45.2″E
- Authorised by: Gerichtsverfassungsgesetz
- Website: olg-koeln.nrw.de

President
- Currently: Bernd Scheiff

Vice President
- Currently: Christian Schmitz-Justen; Peter Lichtenberg

The Higher Regional Court of Cologne (German: Oberlandesgericht Köln; abbreviated: OLG Köln) is one of the three Higher Regional Courts of North Rhine-Westphalia.

== History ==
The Higher Regional Court of Cologne is the successor of the Appellate court of Cologne which was formed by Frederick William III of Prussia on 21 June 1819. The Higher Regional Court formed on 27 January 1877, as did every Higher Regional Court due to the Gerichtsverfassungsgesetz (Courts Constitution Act).

== Former presidents of the court ==
- 1879–1886: Heinrich Heimsoeth
- 1887: Friedrich Wilhelm Vierhaus
- 1987–1899: Johannes Struckmann
- 1899–1905: Oskar Hamm
- 1905–1908: Adolf Ratjen
- 1909–1913: Karl Morkamer
- 1914–1916: Albrecht Nückel
- 1916–1922: Josef Frenken
- 1923–1932: Heinrich Reichartz
- 1932–1933: Max-Josef Volmer
- 1933–1943: Alexander Bergmann
- 1943–1944: Erich Lawall
- 1948–1962: Werner Korintenberg
- 1962–1975: Josef Wolffram
- 1978–1983: Herbert Weltrich
- 1984–1996: Dieter Laum
- 1997–2003: Armin Lünterbusch
- 2004: vacant
- 2005–2014: Johannes Riedel
- 2014–2016: Peter Kamp
- 2017–2019: Margarete Gräfin von Schwerin
- 2020–2021: vacant
- since 2021: Bernd Scheiff
