= Heinrich Haslinde =

Heinrich Haslinde was a German politician of the Zentrumspartei who lived from 21 May 1881 (Berlin) to 26 November 1958 (Marquartstein). He served as the governor (Landrat) of the district of Arnsberg, district president of the Münster region before becoming Reich Minister of Food and Agriculture under Luther (II) and Marx (III) from 20 January 1926 to 17 December 1926.

After he was forcibly retired by the National Socialists, he volunteered for war service but returned after being dismissed for severe illness in '43. By the US occupation and the first post-war Chancellor Adenauer multiple high ranking offices were offered to him, that he all rejected over health concerns.

== Works (selection) ==
- Befugnisse der Orts- und Landespolizeibehörde in Preußen gegenüber den Eisenbahnen. Diss. Leipzig, Jurist. Fakultät, 1909 (48 Seiten).

== Literature ==
- Gerhart Berger, Detlev Aurand: …weiland Bursch zu Heidelberg… Eine Festschrift der Heidelberger Korporationen zur 600-Jahr-Feier der Ruperto Carola. Heidelberger Verlagsanstalt und Druckerei, Heidelberg 1986, ISBN 3-920431-63-4.
- Theophil Gerber: Persönlichkeiten aus Land- und Forstwirtschaft, Gartenbau und Veterinärmedizin, Biographisches Lexikon. Band 1: A–L, 4. Auflage. Nora Verlag, Berlin 2014, S. 278.
