= Heinrich Brauns =

German theologian and politician (1868–1939)

Reich Minister of Labour
- In office 25 June 1920 – 12 June 1928
- Chancellor: Constantin Fehrenbach; Joseph Wirth; Wilhelm Cuno; Gustav Stresemann; Wilhelm Marx; Hans Luther
- Preceded by: Alexander Schlicke
- Succeeded by: Rudolf Wissell

Member of the Reichstag
- In office 1920–1933
- Constituency: National list (1920-1924); Weser-Ems (1924-1932); National list (1932-1933)

Member of the National Assembly
- In office 6 February 1919 – 21 May 1920
- Constituency: Köln-Aachen

Personal details
- Born: 3 January 1868 Cologne, Kingdom of Prussia, North German Confederation
- Died: 19 October 1939 (aged 71) Lindenberg im Allgäu, Nazi Germany
- Party: Centre Party
- Profession: Theologian, priest, politician

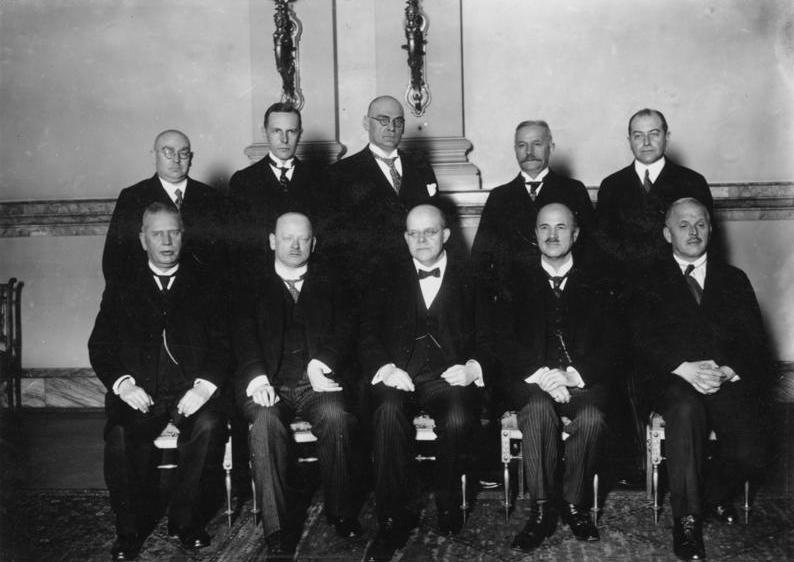
Heinrich Brauns (front row, left) as a member of the Marx cabinet, 1927

Heinrich Brauns (3 January 1868 – 19 October 1939) was a German politician and Roman Catholic theologian, who for the German Center Party was a long-serving Minister of Labour of the Weimar Republic from 1920 to 1928. Serving in a total of 13 cabinets, Brauns was a major influence on social policy in the period of German history.

== Early life ==
Heinrich Brauns was born on 3 January 1868 in Cologne, in what was then the Kingdom of Prussia. He was the only child of Johann Brauns (1838–1919), a tailor and his wife Anna Catharina (1838–1901), née Creveld. He attended the Apostelgymnasium at Cologne, where he made his Abitur in 1886.

He studied theology and philosophy at the University of Bonn and then attended a seminary at Cologne. In 1890, he was ordained as a priest and became a chaplain at Krefeld. In 1895, he became a vicar in Borbeck near Essen.

He worked in pastoral care until in 1900 he became head of the organisation department and economics teaching at the Zentralstelle des Volksvereins für das katholische Deutschland (a Roman Catholic organisation) at Mönchengladbach. At the same time he studied economics and public policy. In 1905 he was awarded a doctorate in Staatswissenschaften.

== Political career ==
A member of the Catholic party known as Zentrum, after World War I Brauns worked towards the establishment of an interdenominational Christian political party which did not materialise. In January 1919, Brauns was elected to the National Assembly, and in February worked with other delegates to prevent the Betriebsrätegesetz from reflecting radical Räte ideology. Brauns was returned to the Reichstag in June 1920. He joined the cabinet of Chancellor Constantin Fehrenbach that same month as Minister of Labour, a position he held for the next eight years under changing heads of government.

During this time, he worked towards alleviating the differences between the social classes and for a cooperation between the associations of the workers and employers on a footing of equality. This was supposed to be achieved by collective bargaining and work in the Zentralarbeitsgemeinschaft, a joint institution of labour unions and employers' association. Since 1920, Brauns was a member of the leadership of the Zentrum where he was part of the party's right wing. This brought him into conflict with the left, since he opposed some of their policies, arguing that getting too close to Social Democratic or Communist positions would remove the reason for existence of the Christian unions and the Zentrum.

As Minister of Labour, Brauns advanced laws and decrees on works councils, workers' participation in management, collective bargaining agreements, labour arbitration, labour law and employment exchanges. He also supported rules on policies such as social security entitlements or handouts for the war-wounded. Brauns was a major influence on social policy in Weimar Germany.

When Hermann Müller formed his second cabinet in 1928, he wanted to retain Brauns as Minister of Labour, but internal party politics in the Zentrum prevented Brauns from staying in office. After leaving the government, Brauns remained a member of the Reichstag, serving first as vice-chair of the Sozialpolitischer Ausschuss (committee on social policy) and from 1930 to 1933 as its chairman. He also wrote about social policy issues, and was active in the international Catholic labour movement. He led the German delegation to the International Labour Conference at Geneva in 1929–31. In 1931, he chaired a commission named after him, created by chancellor Heinrich Brüning that looked into the causes and ramifications of the Great Depression. His connections and frequent travels abroad caused him to be very critical of the Nazi takeover of power in 1933 and made him pessimistic about the path the country was taking.

His party did not renominate him for the Reichstag elections of 5 March 1933 and he retired to Lindenberg im Allgäu. He was prosecuted by the Nazis and was one of the defendants at the Volksvereinsprozess (1933–35), where he was found not guilty. Brauns died in Lindenberg on 19 October 1939 following an appendicitis.

== Honours ==
Brauns was awarded an honorary doctorate in law by the University of Cologne in 1921. In 1978, the Bishop of Essen founded the Heinrich-Brauns-Preis for merits in the cause of furthering Catholic social teaching and the Christian-social movement. It is awarded every two years.

== Works ==
- Die christlichen Gewerkschaften, 1908
- Lohnpolitik, 1921
- Wirtschaftskrisis und Sozialpolitik, 1924
- Das Betriebsrätegesetz, 1924
- "Aufsätze und Abhandlungen", in: Soziale Praxis, Politisches Jahrbuch, 1926, 1927/28
- Recht und Staat in Deutschland, 1929
