= Johanne Schjørring =

Danish author

Helene Johanne Caroline Schjørring (née Krohne; 4 June 1836 in Skive – 9 March 1910 in Frederiksberg) was a Danish author of Bildungsroman novels, a genre of coming of age novels, such as Esther's History (1884), Sirius (1900), Lange Skygger (1904) and Iris (1907). A member of the Danish Women's Society, she was one of the first ten women in Denmark to be awarded state support for her writing in 1883.
