= German tariff of 1925 =

Result of the 1924 Reichstag election, constituencies with a plurality for the protectionist DNVP are coloured in light blue.

The German tariff of 1925 was a moderately protectionist law passed by the Reichstag that reintroduced tariffs on agricultural imports into Weimar Germany. It came into force on 1 September 1925.

Under the Treaty of Versailles Germany was forbidden from setting its own tariff until 1925. Tariffs on agricultural products had been abolished at the start of World War I to ensure a continuous food supply. There was great controversy over whether protectionism should be resumed for agriculture. Left-wing parties and those representing small peasants opposed protection, with the conservatives and those representing large landowners in favour.

The election of December 1924 led to a coalition government under Hans Luther, with the protectionist DNVP supporting an agricultural tariff. There also emerged a new solidarity bloc between industry and agriculture that favoured the restoration of protection. Although the new tariff nominally restored tariff rates similar to the prewar duties on grain, the provisional rates during the transition period were lower: wheat was subject to a duty of 3.50 marks per quintal and rye to a duty of 3 marks. However, from August 1926 wheat and rye were subject to a duty of 5 marks. The tariff helped to moderate the fall in prices.
