= Rudolf Krohne =

German politician (1876–1953)

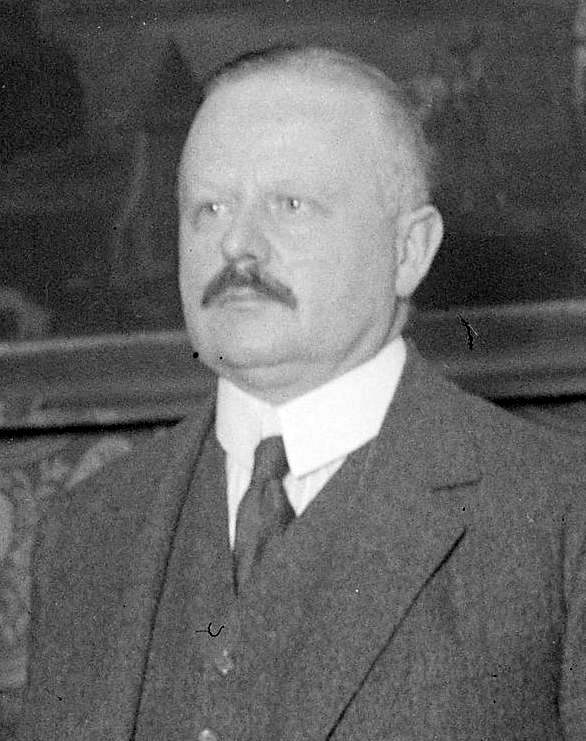
Rudolf Krohne in 1925

Rudolf Krohne (1876–1953) was a German jurist and politician who was a member of the German People's Party and served as transport minister between 1925 and 1927.

== Biography ==
Krohne was born on 6 September 1876 in Rendsburg. In 1898 he received a PhD in law and began to work in the judicial system of Prussia. From 1917 he worked at the Prussian ministry for public works. He was a member of the German People's Party. He was transport minister between 30 November 1923 and 3 June 1924 in the cabinet led by Wilhelm Marx. On 26 October 1925 Krohne was named as economics minister to the first cabinet of Hans Luther, replacing Albert Neuhaus in the post. Krohne served in the post until December 1925. The same year he was also appointed transport minister which he held until 1927 when he resigned from the post. He served in the first and second cabinet of Hans Luther and in the third cabinet of Wilhelm Marx.

He died on 17 June 1953 in Berlin.
