= Locarno Treaties =

1925 agreements between Germany and its neighbours

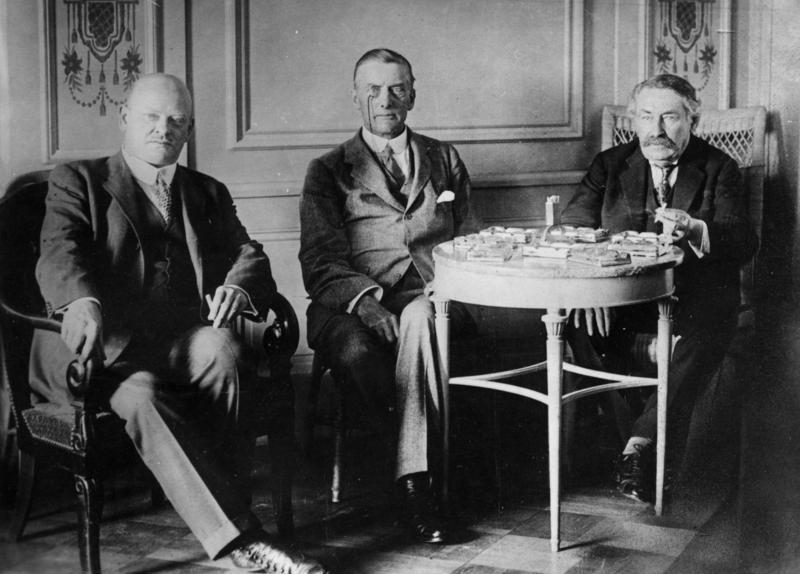
- From left to right, Gustav Stresemann, Austen Chamberlain and Aristide Briand during the Locarno negotiations
- Type: Multilateral treaty
- Signed: 1 December 1925
- Location: London, England, UK
- Effective: 14 September 1926
- Condition: Germany's entry into the League of Nations

The Locarno Treaties, known collectively as the Locarno Pact, were seven post–World War I agreements negotiated amongst Germany, France, the United Kingdom, Belgium, Italy, Poland and Czechoslovakia in late 1925. In the main treaty, the five western European nations pledged to guarantee the inviolability of the German-French and German-Belgian borders as defined in the Treaty of Versailles. They also promised to observe the demilitarized zone of the German Rhineland and to resolve differences peacefully under the auspices of the League of Nations. In the additional arbitration treaties with Poland and Czechoslovakia, Germany agreed to the peaceful settlement of disputes, but there was notably no guarantee of its eastern border, leaving the path open for Germany to attempt to revise the Versailles Treaty and regain territory it had lost in the east under its terms.

The Locarno Treaties significantly improved the political climate of western Europe from 1925 to 1930 and fostered expectations for continued peaceful settlements which were often referred to as the "spirit of Locarno". The most notable result of the treaties was Germany's acceptance into the League of Nations in 1926.

The treaties effectively went out of force on 7 March 1936 when troops of Nazi Germany entered the demilitarized Rhineland and the other treaty signatories failed to respond.

== Background ==
German territorial losses under the Treaty of Versailles (in pale yellow)

Under the terms of the Treaty of Versailles, Germany lost 13% of its European territory and 12% of its population, primarily to France (Alsace–Lorraine) and a restored Poland. In order to make sure that Germany could no longer threaten France militarily, its territory west of the Rhine was occupied by Allied troops and all German military activity in the region prohibited; an area fifty kilometres east of the Rhine was also demilitarized. Germany had not been allowed to participate in the treaty negotiations and deeply resented what it considered to be the humiliating terms. Revising the Versailles Treaty became an important goal of German politicians during the Weimar Republic.

== Foreign policy goals ==
Germany thought that only by revising the Treaty of Versailles could it restore the full internal and diplomatic independence it had lost under the treaty's restrictions. Gustav Stresemann, who had been chancellor and foreign minister of Germany in late 1923 and then stayed on as foreign minister in the following cabinets, had hoped that by attempting to fulfil the terms of the treaty he could gain the goodwill of the Allies and restore some freedom of diplomatic movement. He wanted to secure the peace, especially with France, recover the land lost to Poland, end reparations payments and the occupation of the Rhineland, and by so doing gradually make Germany a great power again.

For its part, France was concerned primarily with security against further German aggression. It had signed treaties with Poland, Czechoslovakia, Romania and Yugoslavia, creating a cordon sanitaire ringing Germany on the east. In 1923, France had occupied the Ruhr in order to force the reparations payments, which Germany had defaulted on several times. France was also seeking additional security guarantees from Britain.

British foreign policy during the interwar years was radically different from France's. It sought to restore Germany as a peaceful, prosperous nation. Foreign Secretary Austen Chamberlain hoped that if Franco-German relations improved, France would gradually abandon its cordon sanitaire. Once France had ended its alliances in Eastern Europe as the price of better relations with Germany, Poland and Czechoslovakia would have no great power ally to protect them and would be forced to adjust to German demands. Chamberlain believed that the chances for a lasting peace in Europe would improve after they handed over the territories claimed by Germany such as the Sudetenland, the Polish Corridor and the Free City of Danzig.

== Initiation of the treaties ==
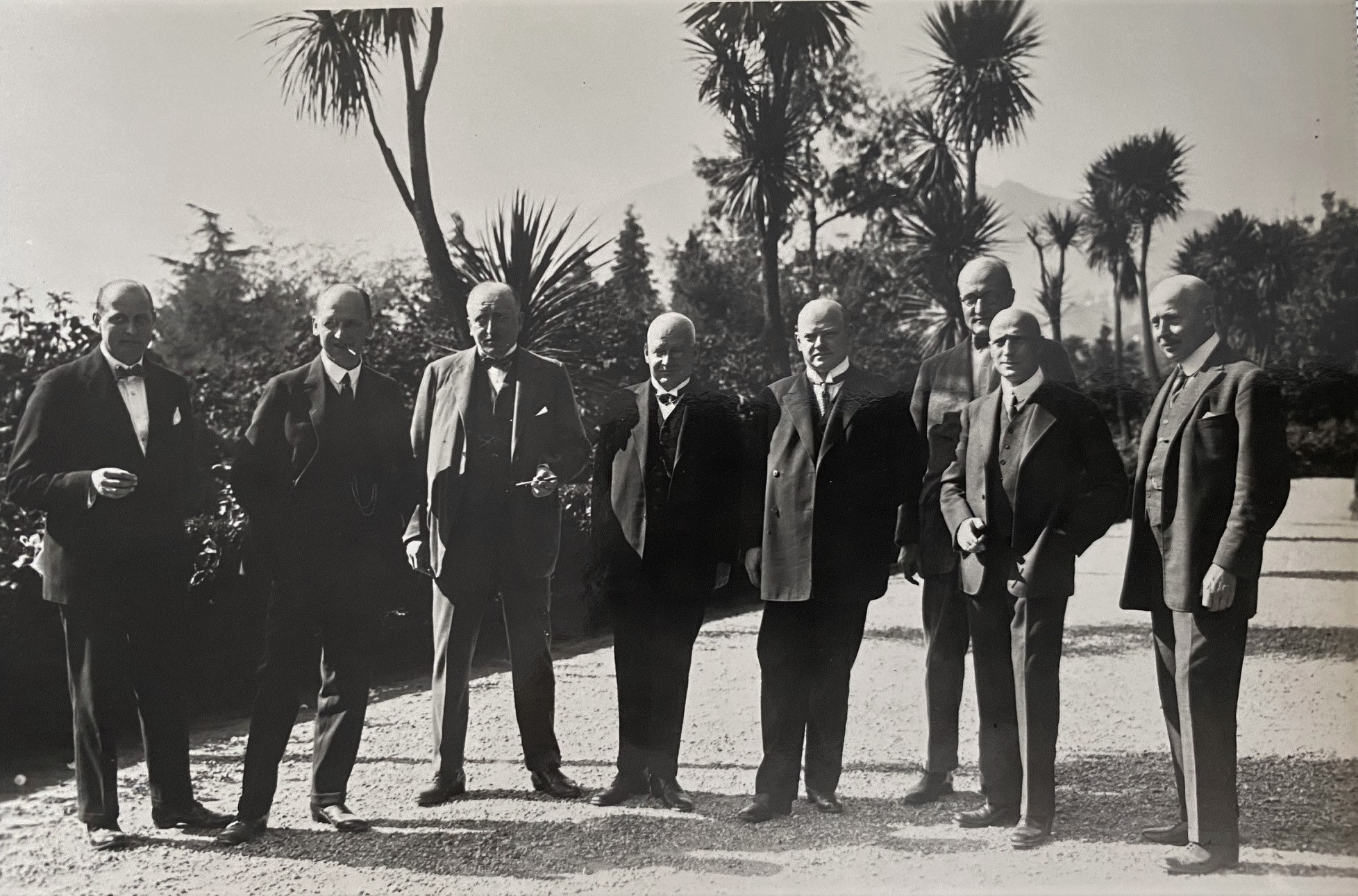
The German delegation at Locarno. Gustav Stresemann is fifth from the left; Hans Luther is standing slightly behind him, to his left.

The push for the Locarno Treaties came as an indirect result of the Allies' refusal to withdraw their troops from the Cologne region and areas of the occupied Rhineland to the north of it. The Treaty of Versailles stipulated the withdrawal five years after the signing of the treaty if Germany had faithfully fulfilled its terms. An Allied inspection of Germany's military installations had found significant violations of Versailles' disarmament provisions, most notably its failure to adhere to the 100,000-man limit on its army. As a result, the planned withdrawal was postponed. On 5 January 1925, the Allies justified their decision in a note with vague references to German "breaches of the disarmament clauses of the Treaty of Versailles".

In order to resolve the issue, German foreign minister Stresemann sent secret memorandums to the UK (January 1925) and France (in February) suggesting a treaty which would require all parties interested in the Rhine borders to solve their issues peacefully. Germany, he stated, was ready to guarantee the current border status and to conclude an arbitration pact with France. Privately, Stresemann hoped that settling border issues with France would make it possible for Germany to adjust its eastern border with Poland to Germany's advantage.

Following the UK's muted expression of openness to the German proposal, France cautiously followed suit. It wanted Belgium to be included in the treaty and assumed that it would not go into effect until Germany joined the League of Nations. A French condition that particularly concerned Germany asked that the signers of the treaty on Germany's western border be guarantors of the arbitration treaties Germany would sign with Poland and Czechoslovakia. Germany agreed to accept France's conditions with the important reservation that it would not make guarantees about its eastern borders. The United Kingdom also did not support France on the issue. Stresemann's diplomatic feelers faced strong opposition at home, especially regarding the renunciation of Germany's claim to Alsace–Lorraine, which was west of the Rhine. The objections came from Chancellor Hans Luther, Defence Secretary Otto Gessler, the political parties of the Right and the leadership of the Reichswehr.

Following discussions in London in early September between representatives of the UK, France, Germany, Belgium and Italy, the parties agreed to meet in Locarno, Switzerland in October to finalize the treaty.

== Parties and agreement ==
=== Attendees ===
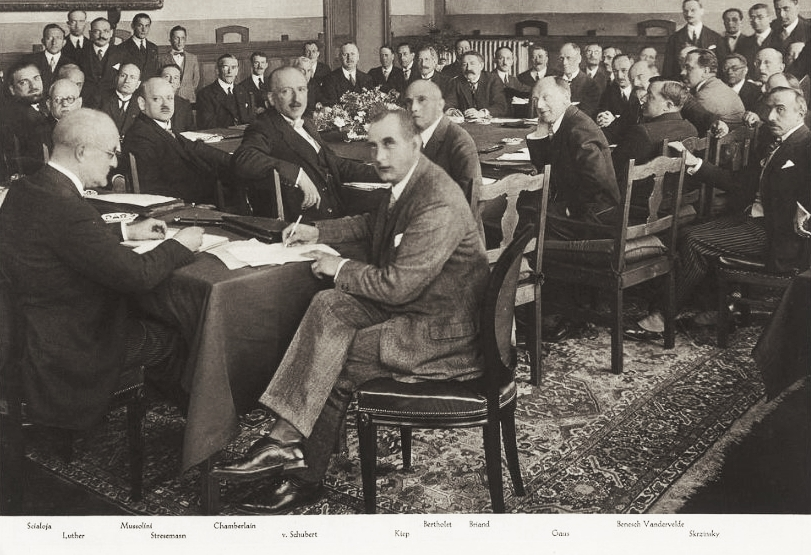
The Locarno conference attendees. They include Mussolini, Stresemann, Chamberlain and Briand.

The key attendees at the Locarno meeting between 5 and 16 October 1925 were:

Signatories of the main treaty (the "high contracting parties" referred to in the text of the treaty):

- Germany: Chancellor Hans Luther and Foreign Minister Gustav Stresemann
- France: Minister of Foreign Affairs Aristide Briand
- The United Kingdom: Foreign Secretary Austen Chamberlain
- Belgium: Minister of Foreign Affairs Emile Vandervelde
- Italy: Senator Vittorio Scialoja, with periodic attendance by Prime Minister Benito Mussolini

Signatories of the four separate treaties (in addition to Germany and France):

- Poland: Minister of Foreign Affairs Aleksander Skrzyński
- Czechoslovakia: Foreign Minister Edvard Beneš

=== Treaties and agreements ===
The seven treaties and agreements were:

- Treaty of mutual guarantee between Germany, Belgium, France, the UK and Italy (main treaty)
- Arbitration agreements between:
  - Germany and France
  - Germany and Belgium
- Arbitration treaties (rather than agreements because they were not addenda to the main treaty) between:
  - Germany and Poland
  - Germany and Czechoslovakia
- Separate treaties between
  - France and Poland
  - France and Czechoslovakia

=== Main terms of the treaty of mutual guarantee ===
- Germany, France, the UK, Belgium and Italy guaranteed to maintain the inviolability of the borders between Germany and Belgium and between Germany and France as established by the Treaty of Versailles. They also pledged to observe the demilitarized zone of the Rhineland as defined in Articles 42 and 43 of the Treaty of Versailles.
- Germany and Belgium, and also Germany and France, mutually promised that they would in no case resort to war against each other. Three exceptions were allowed, including breach of the terms of the demilitarized Rhineland.
- Germany, France and Belgium resolved to settle disputes peacefully with the involvement of the League of Nations Council.
- Articles 4 and 5 spelled out the mutual guarantees of the provisions and the actions to be taken against a signatory who violated the treaty. The League of Nations was to play a central role in adjudicating violations. If it determined that a breach had occurred, the other signatories were to assist the country against which the violation had taken place.

=== Arbitration agreements and treaties ===
==== Germany–France and Germany–Belgium ====
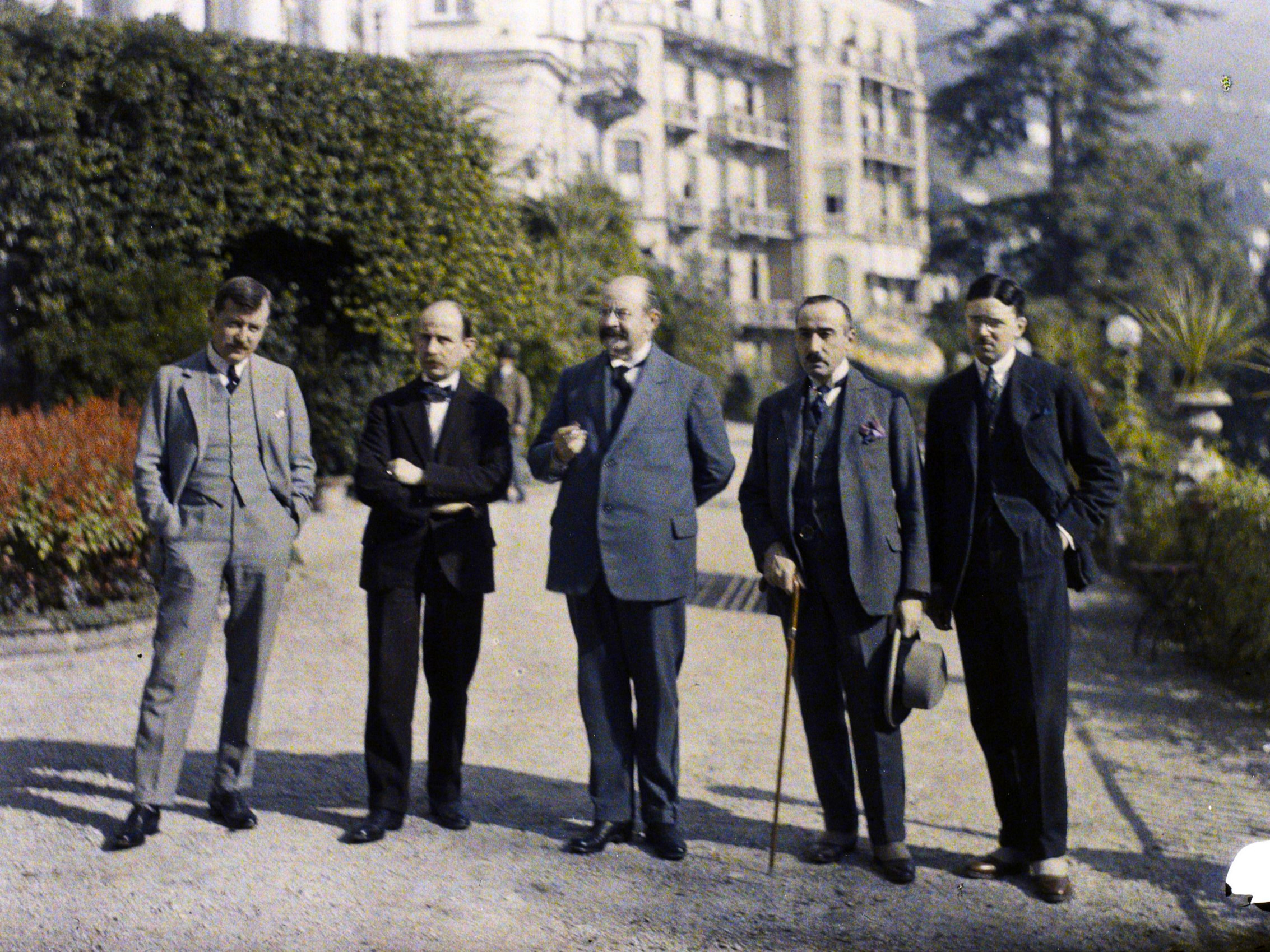
Autochrome of the Belgian delegation. Left to right: Henri Rolin, Joseph de Ruelle, Emile Vandervelde, Pierre van Zuylen and Ferdinand du Chastel

The terms of the two arbitration agreements were identical and were intended to peacefully handle "all disputes of every kind between Germany and France / Belgium with regard to which the parties are in conflict as to their respective rights, and which it may not be possible to settle amicably by the normal methods of diplomacy." Each arbitration agreement set up a five-member Permanent Conciliation Commission with one member named by Germany, one by France or Belgium and three others by common agreement from three different countries. If the Permanent Conciliation Commission(s) were not able to reach an agreement, the matter was to be passed to either the Permanent Court of International Justice or an arbitral tribunal as established by the Hague Convention of 1907. If the two parties had not been able to reach an agreement within a month after the Permanent Conciliation Commission finished its work, either party could request that the question be brought before the Council of the League of Nations.

The parties could choose to bypass the Permanent Conciliation Commissions and go directly to the Permanent Court of International Justice or an arbitral tribunal.

==== Germany–Poland and Germany–Czechoslovakia ====
The arbitration treaties between Germany and Poland and Germany and Czechoslovakia were in their major points nearly identical to Germany's arbitration agreements with France and Belgium. The independent treaties with Poland and Czechoslovakia were, however, non-binding, and there was no guarantee of Germany's eastern borders that mirrored the statements in the main treaty that fixed its western borders where they had been set by the Treaty of Versailles. Stresemann did not want an "Eastern Locarno". His goal was to use economic means to push Poland into border negotiations.

Poland especially was unhappy about the addendum to the Locarno Treaties titled "Collective Note to Germany Regarding Article 16 of the Covenant of the League of Nations". Article 16 required member nations to participate in sanctions or military action against a country that attacked a member state of the League. The Collective Note stated that the League would take into consideration a country's military capability when invoking Article 16. Germany interpreted the note to mean that after it joined the League of Nations, it would be free to make its own decision on how to respond if the League invoked Article 16 against the Soviet Union (e.g. for attacking Poland).

=== France–Poland and France–Czechoslovakia ===
The treaties between France and Poland and France and Czechoslovakia guaranteed mutual assistance under Article 16 of the Covenant of the League of Nations if either party was attacked without provocation due to a failure of the terms of the Locarno Treaties to be observed.

== Effects and evaluations ==
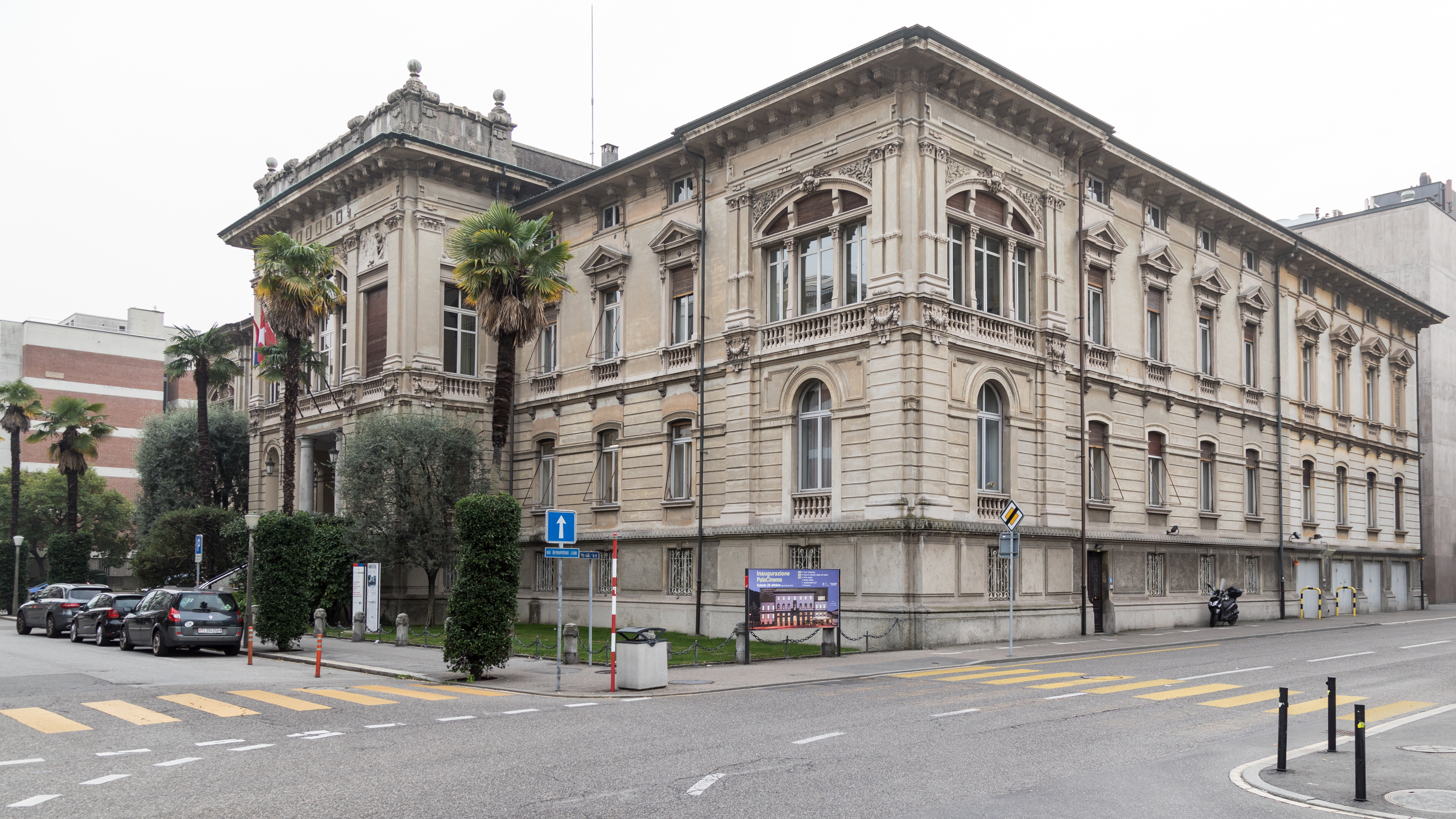
The former court house in Locarno where the treaties were negotiated

In November 1925 the German Reichstag approved the Locarno Treaties by a vote of 291 to 174 with three abstentions; in the British House of Commons, the vote to pass was 375 to 13. The treaties were formally signed in London on 1 December. In Germany the approval led to the collapse of the Luther government. The parties of the Right were angry over the loss of Alsace–Lorraine, while those on the Left feared that Germany could be drawn into a "capitalist war" against the Soviet Union.

Locarno contributed to the worsening of the atmosphere between Poland and France and weakened the Franco-Polish alliance. Since Germany did not commit to guarantees on its eastern borders, the Locarno Treaties were a defeat for Poland and one of the contributing factors to the fall of the Grabski cabinet on 14 November 1925. Józef Beck, at the time Poland's military attaché to France, ridiculed the treaties, saying that "Germany was officially asked to attack the east in return for peace in the west." Józef Piłsudski said that "every honest Pole spits when he hears the word [Locarno]". Proposals in 1934 (after Adolf Hitler had become German chancellor) for an "eastern Locarno" pact securing Germany's eastern frontiers foundered on German opposition and on Poland's insistence that its eastern borders should be covered by a western guarantee.

Overall the Locarno Treaties marked a dramatic improvement in the political climate of western Europe from 1925 to 1930. They promoted expectations for continued peaceful settlements, often called the "spirit of Locarno". As a result of the treaties, the delayed withdrawal of British troops from the Cologne region took place in January 1926, and Germany was accepted into the League of Nations with a permanent seat on the Council on 10 September 1926. In additional signs of the improved relations between Germany and the Allied powers, the Inter-Allied Commission overseeing Germany's disarmament was disbanded in 1927, the Young Plan for settling reparations issues was signed in 1929, and the last of the occupying troops left the Rhineland in 1930, five years earlier than set by the Treaty of Versailles.

The Nobel Peace Prize was awarded to the lead negotiators of the treaty: Austen Chamberlain in 1925 and Aristide Briand and Gustav Stresemann jointly in 1926.

Historian Sally Marks wrote in her 1976 book The Illusion of Peace:

Henceforth the spirit of Locarno would reign, substituting conciliation for enforcement as the basis for peace. Yet for some peace remained a desperate hope rather than an actuality. A few men knew that the spirit of Locarno was a fragile foundation on which to build a lasting peace.

Hans Mommsen, in The Rise and Fall of Weimar Democracy, summed up the Locarno Treaties in the following words:

The "Spirit of Locarno" as a symbol for a new era of international understanding and commitment to avoid European military conflict, however, concealed a tenacious struggle over the interests of national states in which Stresemann, unlike Aristide Briand, showed no inclination whatsoever to make generous concessions. The memorable words of the French premier that Locarno marked "the beginning of an era of trust" never became reality. ... In Stresemann's verdict, Locarno represented no more than a first step on the road to the "gradual reacquisition of German sovereignty through a network of European treaties."

== End of the treaties ==
The Nazi regime under Adolf Hitler repudiated the Locarno Treaties when it sent troops across the Rhine on 7 March 1936. Hitler justified the remilitarization of the Rhineland and the breaking of both the Treaty of Versailles and of Locarno by citing Germany's right to self-determination and the Franco-Soviet Treaty of Mutual Assistance of 2 May 1935, which he called a breach of the Locarno Treaties. There was no reaction from the signatories of the Locarno Treaties other than verbal condemnation. Italy had already promised not to act, and France did not have the support of the UK. Although the Locarno Treaties remained technically in force, the German remilitarization of the Rhineland and the lack of response to it marked their practical end.

== See also ==
- France–Germany relations
- International relations (1919–1939)
- Little Entente
