= First Brüning cabinet =

1930–1931 cabinet of Weimar Germany

First Cabinet of Heinrich Brüning
- 17th Cabinet of Weimar Germany
- 1930–1931
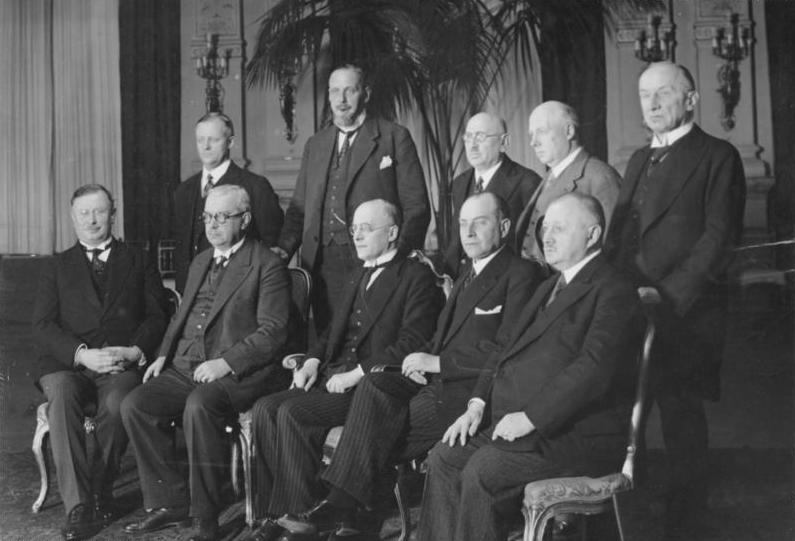
- Members of the cabinet
- Date formed: 30 March 1930
- Date dissolved: 10 October 1931 (1 year, 6 months and 10 days)

People and organisations
- President: Paul von Hindenburg
- Chancellor: Heinrich Brüning
- Vice Chancellor: Hermann Dietrich
- Member parties: Centre Party; German Democratic Party; German People's Party; Bavarian People's Party; Reich Party of the German Middle Class; Conservative People's Party
- Status in legislature: Minority Presidential Cabinet
- Opposition parties: Communist Party of Germany; Nazi Party

History
- Election: 1928 federal election
- Legislature term: 4th Reichstag of the Weimar Republic
- Predecessor: Second Müller cabinet
- Successor: Second Brüning cabinet

The first Brüning cabinet, headed by Heinrich Brüning of the Centre Party, was the seventeenth democratically elected government during the Weimar Republic. It took office on 30 March 1930 when it replaced the second Müller cabinet, which had resigned on 27 March over the issue of how to fund unemployment compensation.

Brüning hoped to be able to work with the Reichstag to solve Germany's pressing economic problems, but when it rejected his budget for 1930, he worked with President Paul von Hindenburg to have it converted into an emergency decree. After the Reichstag rejected the decree, Hindenburg, at Brüning's request, dissolved the Reichstag and called new elections. The steps that were taken after the rejection of the 1930 budget marked the beginning of the presidential governments of the Weimar Republic, under which the president and chancellor used constitutional emergency powers to bypass the Reichstag.

Brüning's first cabinet resigned on 10 October 1931 after the failure of an Austro-German customs union forced the resignation of Foreign Minister Julius Curtius, and Hindenburg pressed Brüning to move his cabinet more to the right. It was replaced on the same day by his second cabinet.

== Background ==
After the second Müller cabinet broke up over disagreements about how to finance the increased costs of unemployment insurance following the onset of the Great Depression, President Paul von Hindenburg appointed Centre Party politician Heinrich Brüning chancellor in March 1930 to succeed Hermann Müller, a Social Democrat.

== Composition ==
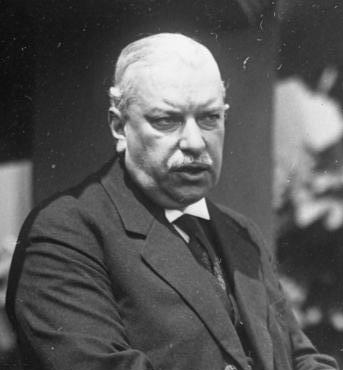
Hermann Dietrich (DDP), Vice-Chancellor, Minister of Economic Affairs and of Finance

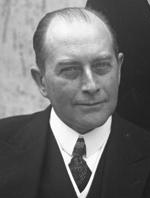
Julius Curtius (DVP), Minister of Foreign Affairs

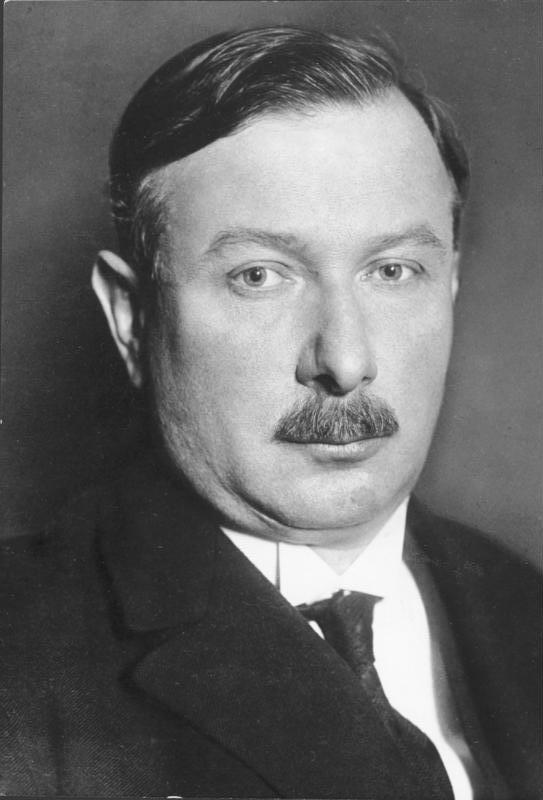
Joseph Wirth (Centre), Minister of the Interior

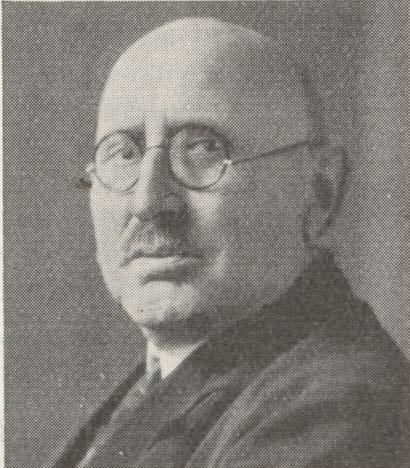
Adam Stegerwald (Centre), Minister of Labour

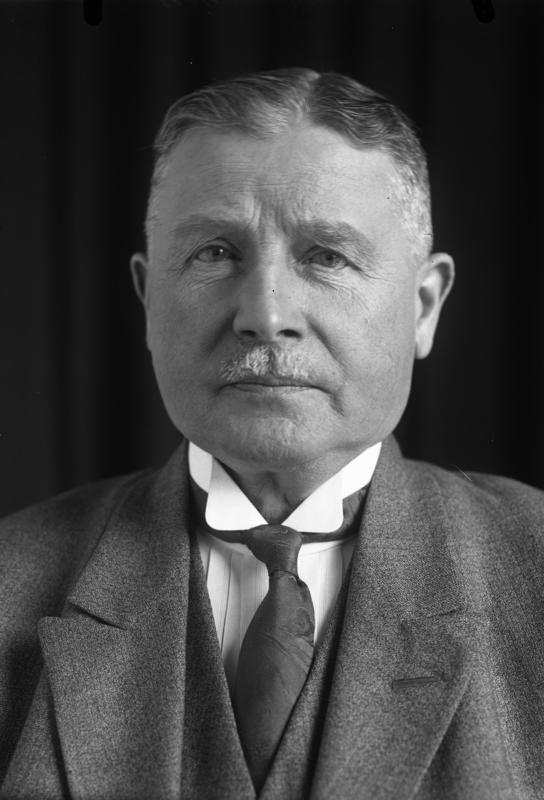
Wilhelm Groener (Ind.), Reichswehr Minister

Well into the heart of the German middle class, it was thought that coalition governments were too weak to deal with the country's problems, or at least that the second Müller cabinet had shown this to be the case. Hindenburg appointed Brüning as chancellor "with the note that his cabinet was to be put together without regard to coalition ties". Brüning nevertheless took over Muller's second cabinet with only three changes. Hindenburg himself had insisted on the appointment of two of the new members: Martin Schiele, an indepdendent who had recently resigned from the German National People's Party (DNVP) for Agriculture and Gottfried Treviranus of the recently formed Conservative People's Party (KVP) for the Occupied Territories. The resulting cabinet was made up of members of seven parties – 4 Centre Party, 2 German Democratic Party (DDP), 2 German People's Party (DVP) 1 Reich Party of the German Middle Class (WP), 1 Bavarian People's Party (BVP), 1 DNVP and 2 KVP – plus one independent.

== Members ==
The members of the cabinet were as follows:

Portfolio	Minister	Took office	Left office	Party
Chancellor	Heinrich Brüning	30 March 1930	10 October 1931	Centre
Vice-Chancellor	Vacant	30 March 1930	26 July 1930	
Vice-Chancellor	Hermann Dietrich	27 July 1930	10 October 1931	DDP
Foreign Affairs	Julius Curtius	30 March 1930	10 October 1931	DVP
Interior	Joseph Wirth	30 March 1930	10 October 1931	Centre
Justice	Johann Viktor Bredt	30 March 1930	5 December 1930	WP
Justice	Curt Joël (acting)	6 December 1930	10 October 1931	Independent
Labour	Adam Stegerwald	30 March 1930	10 October 1931	Centre
Reichswehr	Wilhelm Groener	30 March 1930	10 October 1931	Independent
Economic Affairs	Hermann Dietrich	30 March 1930	26 June 1930	DDP
Economic Affairs	Ernst Trendelenburg (acting)	27 June 1930	10 October 1931	DDP
Finance	Paul Moldenhauer	30 March 1930	20 June 1930	DVP
Finance	Heinrich Brüning (acting)	20 June 1930	26 June 1930	Centre
Finance	Hermann Dietrich	26 June 1930	10 October 1931	DDP
Food and Agriculture	Martin Schiele	30 March 1930	10 October 1931	Independent
Transport	Theodor von Guérard	30 March 1930	10 October 1931	Centre
Postal Affairs	Georg Schätzel	30 March 1930	10 October 1931	BVP
Occupied Territories	Gottfried Treviranus	30 March 1930	30 September 1930	KVP
Occupied Territories	Vacant	1 October 1930	10 October 1931	
Without portfolio	Gottfried Treviranus	30 September 1930	10 October 1931	KVP

== Guiding policies ==
Brüning entered office when the crises of both Weimar parliamentarianism and the Great Depression in Germany were peaking. He knew that the restructuring of finances through the policy of austerity and deflation that he thought necessary would bring about a painful reduction of social benefits, an increase in taxes and the curbing of imports.

In his government declaration of 1 April 1930, Brüning stated that his government was not tied to any coalition and that if he could not solve the nation's most pressing problems with the Reichstag, it would be the last attempt to find a solution with its help – a clear indication that he planned if necessary to govern by presidential decree using the emergency powers of Article 48 of the Weimar Constitution and that he had President Hindenburg's backing to do so. Parliament could revoke such decrees with the prospect of the president calling new elections. A manoeuvre of that nature meant leaving the path of parliamentary government and proceeding on the path of a presidential government.

== Use of presidential decrees ==
Brüning pushed a first bundle of austerity measures through the Reichstag with the help of conservatives and the Social Democrats (SPD), but the Reichstag rejected his budget for 1930. Then followed an outwardly constitutional back and forth:

1. On 16 July, President Hindenburg, following a request from Chancellor Brüning, converted the budget bill into an emergency decree to "safeguard the economy and finances";
2. At the request of the SPD, the Reichstag exercised its right under Article 48 of the Weimar Constitution to reject an emergency decree, with 256 votes from the SPD, Communist Party of Germany (KPD), Nazi Party (NSDAP) and German National People's Party (DNVP);
3. Because the vote in the Reichstag expressed a lack of confidence in Brüning's minority government, Brüning asked Hindenburg to dissolve the Reichstag and call new elections.

To prevent additional dissolutions of Parliament, the SPD decided to tolerate Brüning's government in the future. Brüning had held intensive talks with the SPD, pointing out that the next new elections would be even more disastrous for democracy in Germany than the September 1930 elections that had just been held. The NSDAP had received 18.3% of the vote; in the next election in July 1932 it was to receive 37.3%. The Social Democrats had to allow emergency decrees to pass through parliament, which were much harsher on the workers "than those for the sake of which they had caused the last parliamentary coalition in the spring to fail". Communists or National Socialists always introduced motions to repeal the emergency decrees. Each time, they were rejected by the votes of the governing parties and the SPD.

The number of emergency decrees issued rose from five in 1930 to over forty in 1931. The Reichstag met in 94 sessions in 1930, but this fell by half in 1931.

== End of the first Brüning cabinet ==
On 5 September 1931, an effort to establish an Austro-German Customs Union failed and Foreign Minister Julius Curtius subsequently resigned. Hindenburg and Generalmajor Kurt von Schleicher, a key member of Hindenburg's inner circle, pressured Brüning to move significantly further to the right. Hindenburg wanted him to break his ties to ministers that Hindenburg found too left-wing, too Catholic, or disliked for some other reason. Brüning promised to appoint more conservative ministers who would not be tied to party politics. Hindenburg then accepted the resignation of Brüning's cabinet and charged him with forming the new government.

== Bibliography ==
- Childers, Thomas (1983). The Nazi Voter: The Social Foundations of Fascism in Germany, 1919–1933. University of North Carolina Press. ISBN 0807815705.
