= Second Müller cabinet =

1928–1930 cabinet of Weimar Germany

Second Cabinet of Hermann Müller
- 16th Cabinet of Weimar Germany
- 1928–1930
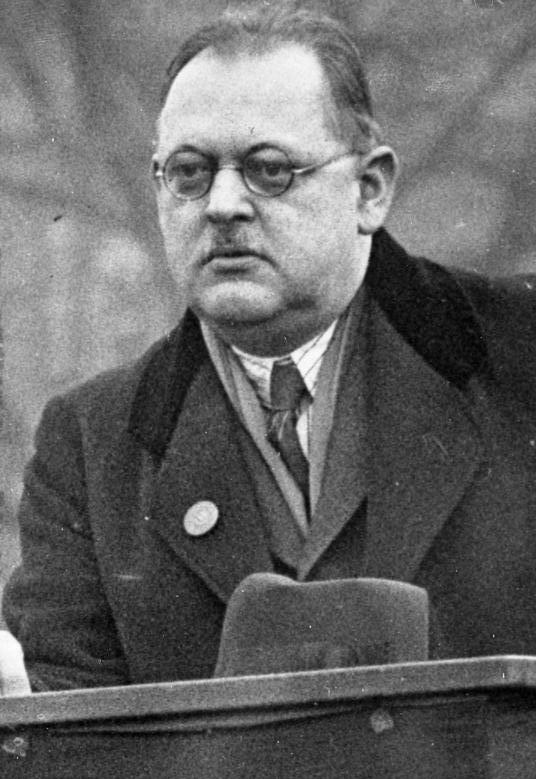
- Chancellor Hermann Müller in August 1928
- Date formed: 28 June 1928
- Date dissolved: 27 March 1930 (1 year, 8 months and 27 days)

People and organisations
- President: Paul von Hindenburg
- Chancellor: Hermann Müller
- Member parties: Social Democratic Party; German Democratic Party; Centre Party; German People's Party; Bavarian People's Party
- Status in legislature: Majority coalition government
- Opposition parties: German National People's Party; Communist Party of Germany; Nazi Party

History
- Election: 1928 federal election
- Legislature term: 4th Reichstag of the Weimar Republic
- Predecessor: Fourth Marx cabinet
- Successor: First Brüning cabinet

The second Müller cabinet, headed by Hermann Müller of the Social Democratic Party (SPD), was the sixteenth democratically elected government during the Weimar Republic. It took office on 28 June 1928 when it replaced the fourth Marx cabinet, which had resigned on 12 June after failing to pass a promised school law.

The cabinet was a grand coalition made up of the Social Democratic Party, German Democratic Party (DDP), Centre Party, German People's Party (DVP) and Bavarian People's Party (BVP). Lasting just under one year and 9 months, it was in office longer than any other government of the politically unstable Weimar Republic. The broad range of views it brought together made it difficult to resolve the issues it faced and weakened support for the parliamentary system as a whole. In a vote on military spending for a new armored cruiser, for example, the SPD leadership felt it necessary to go against its own party's overwhelming opposition in order to preserve the coalition. On economic issues, impasses developed between the coalition parties on the left and the right. It was able to achieve some successes in foreign policy but eventually broke apart over the increased costs of unemployment insurance that came about with the onset of the Great Depression. Müller's second cabinet resigned on 27 March 1930 and was replaced on 30 March by the first cabinet of Heinrich Brüning.

The second Müller cabinet was the last government of the Weimar Republic to be based on parliamentary majorities. The presidential cabinets that followed ruled without the Reichstag using the emergency decree powers that the constitution granted to the German president.

== Election ==
After the Bürgerblock government under Chancellor Wilhelm Marx (Centre) broke apart because of the member parties' differing ideas on school policy, Reichstag elections were held on 20 May 1928. The SPD came out the clear winner, picking up 22 more seats than in 1924, for a total of 153. The Centre Party won 61 seats, the DVP 45, DDP 25 and BVP 17, coming to 301 seats out of the Reichstag's 491. The non-coalition parties with the strongest showings were the nationalist German National People's Party (DNVP) with 73 seats and the Communist Party of Germany (KPD) with 54. The Nazi Party (NSDAP) had 12.

=== Formation of the government ===
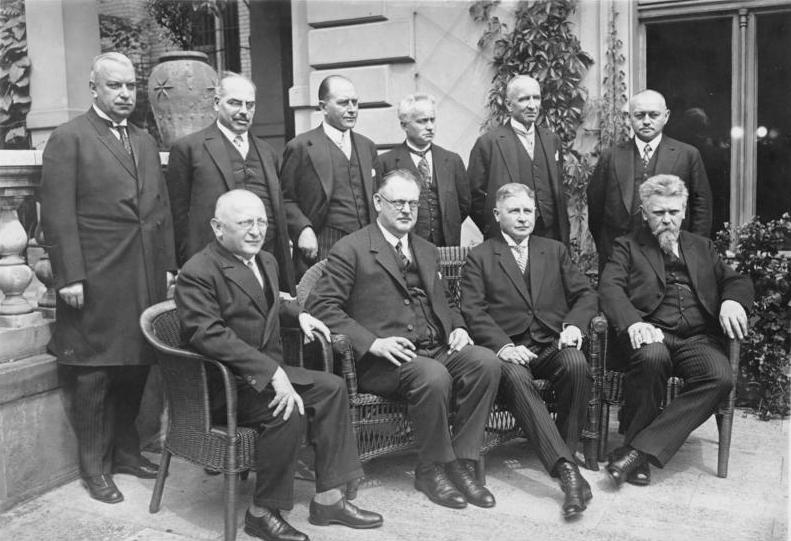
Members of the cabinet in June 1928. Müller is seated, second from left.

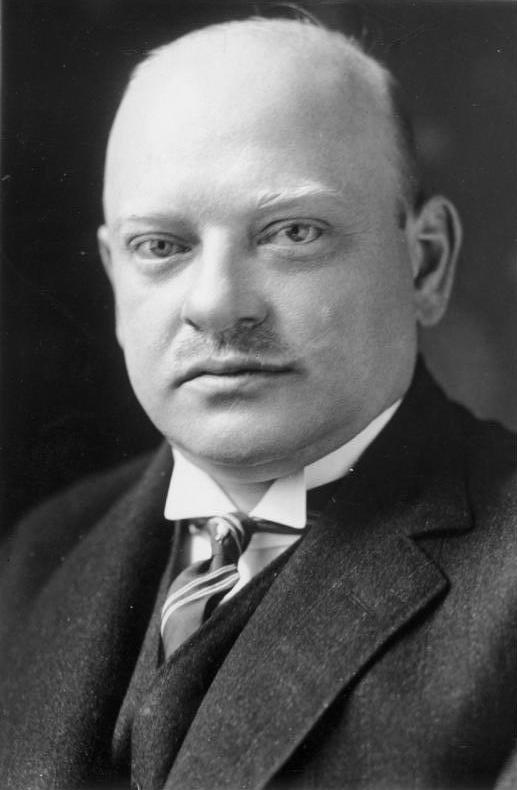
Gustav Stresemann (DVP), Foreign Minister

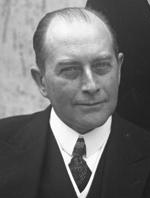
Julius Curtius (DVP), second Minister of Foreign Affairs and Minister of Economic Affairs

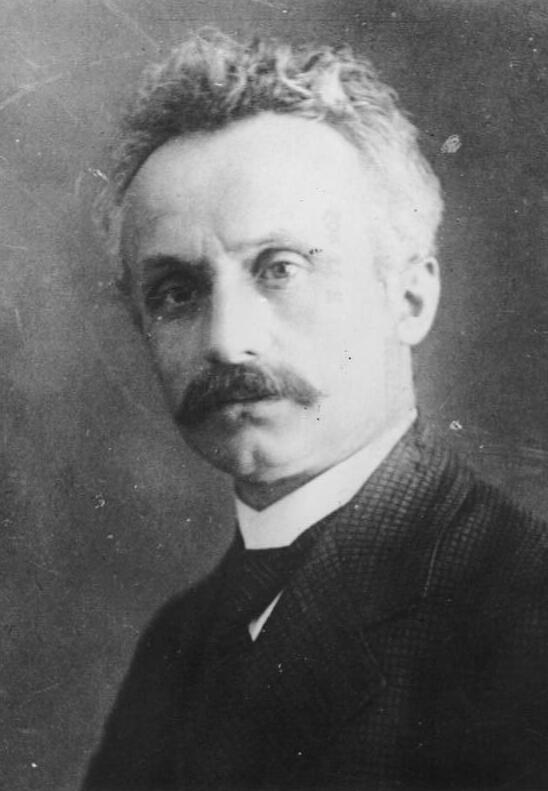
Carl Severing (SPD), Minister of the Interior and of Occupied Territories

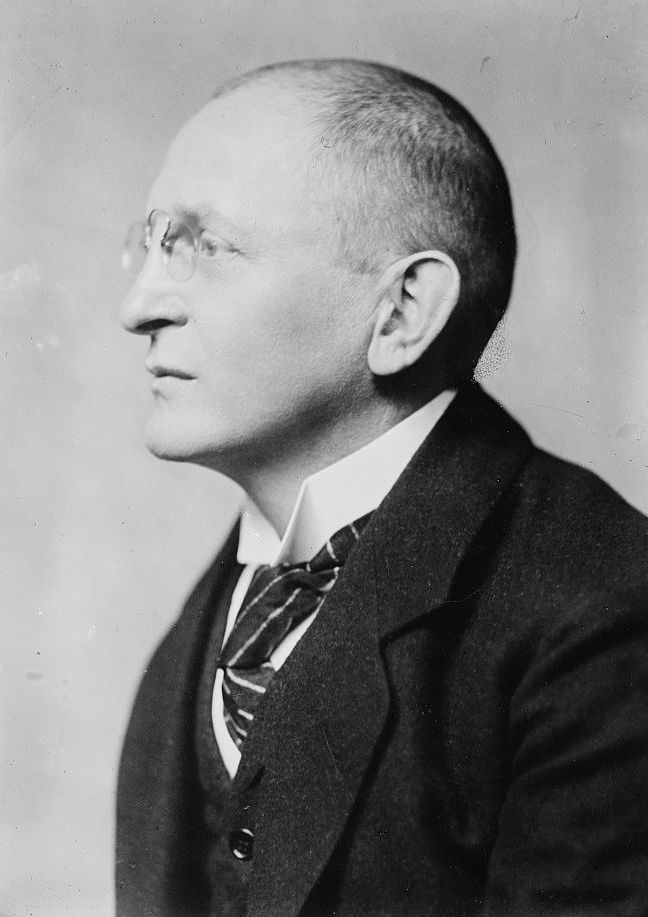
Erich Koch-Weser (DDP), Minister of Justice

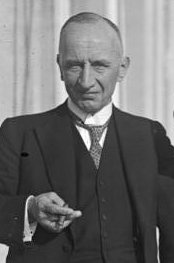
Theodor von Guérard (Centre), Minister of Justice and of Occupied Territories

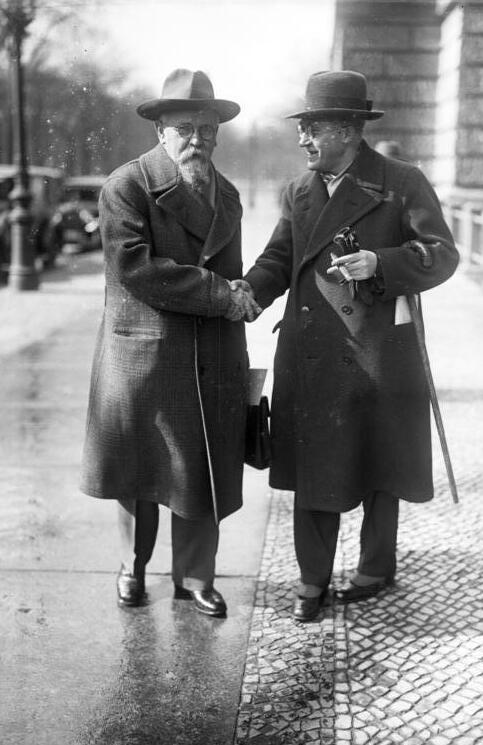
Rudolf Wissel (SPD, on the left), Minister of Labour

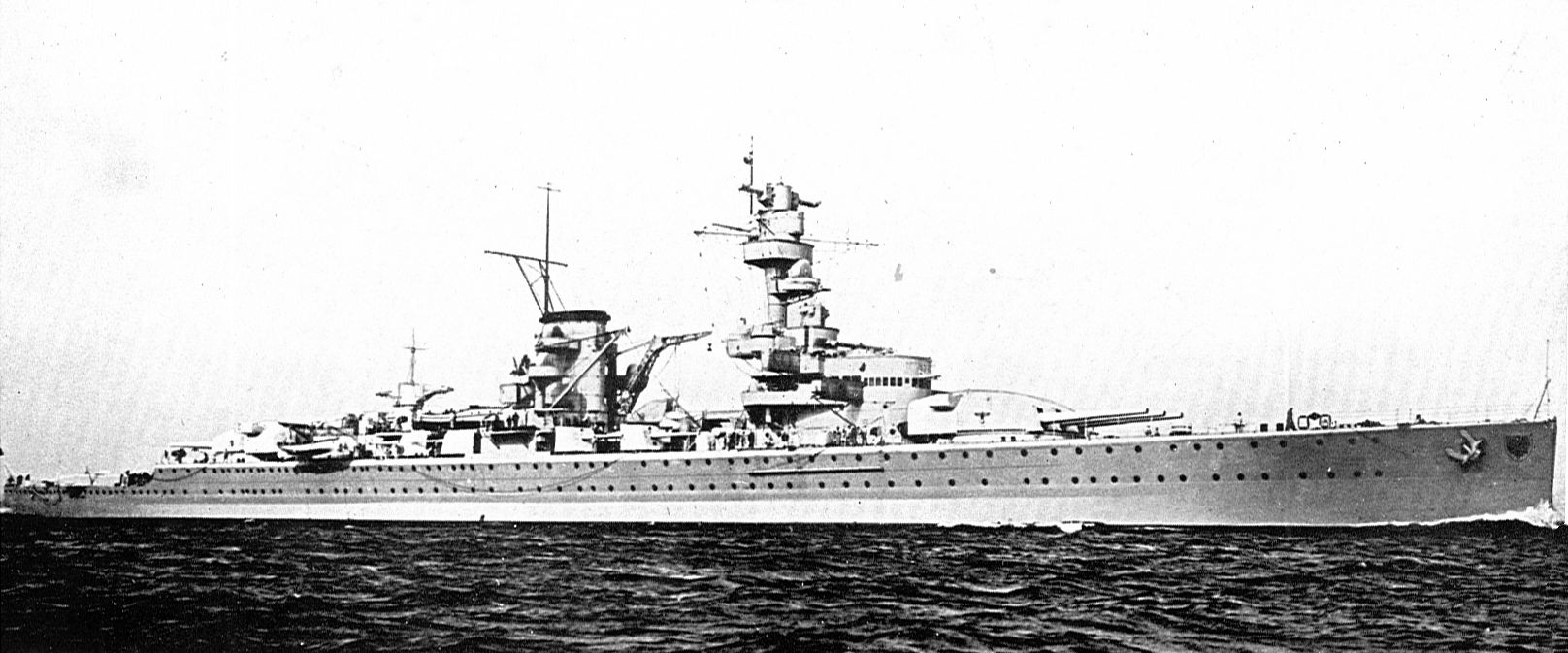
The armored cruiser Deutschland was commissioned in 1933. Its construction was the subject of the controversy in the cabinet and the Reichstag.

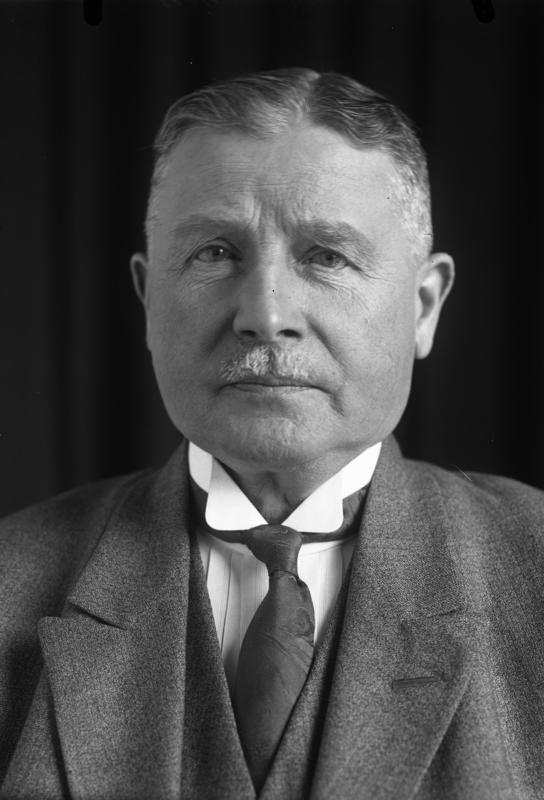
Wilhelm Groener (Ind.), Minister of Defence

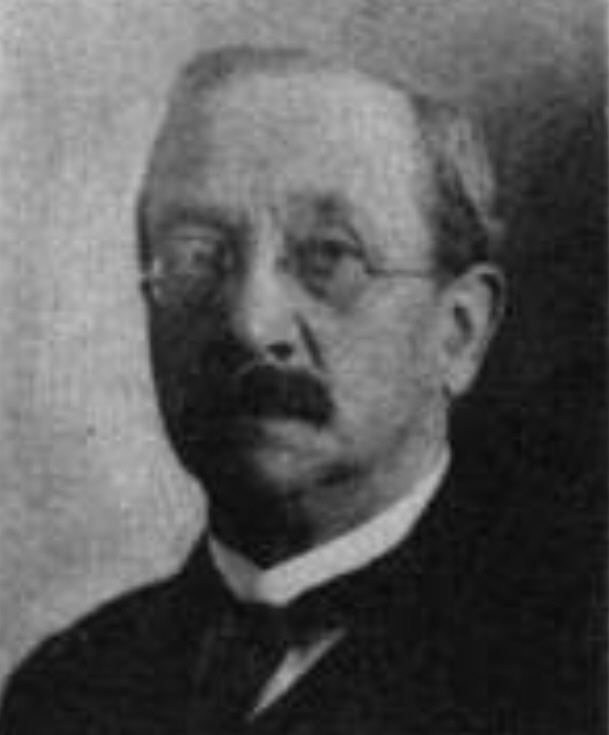
Robert Schmidt (SPD), Minister of Economic Affairs

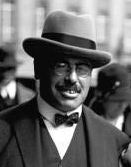
Rudolf Hilferding (SPD), Minister of Finance

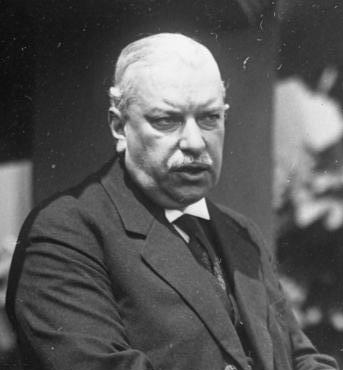
Hermann Dietrich (DDP), Minister of Food and Agriculture

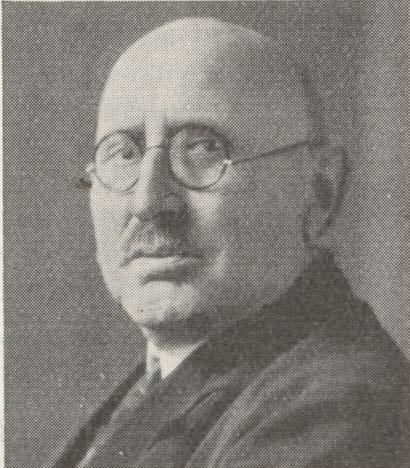
Adam Stegerwald (Centre), Minister of Transport

As the strongest party in the Reichstag, the SPD had the task of forming a government. After not having participated in a cabinet since 1923 (under Gustav Stresemann of the DVP), it had expressed a willingness to take on government responsibility again at its 1927 party congress. It did not have many alternatives in 1928. There were not enough mandates to form a Weimar coalition (SPD, Centre and DDP), and a government of all the middle class parties against the Social Democrats was not possible either. The solution was a grand coalition consisting of the Weimar coalition plus the DVP and BVP.

Within the SPD, Hermann Müller was favored for the office of chancellor. A competing proposal to have the Prussian minister president Otto Braun as chancellor in a personal union of the two positions was quickly discarded. President Paul von Hindenburg would have preferred to see DVP chairman Ernst Scholz as chancellor but allowed himself to be persuaded by his inner circle, which expected a Social Democratic chancellorship to erode SPD support in the medium term. On 12 June 1928, Hindenburg finally entrusted Müller with forming a government, although he continued to play a role in the process. He insisted on Wilhelm Groener as Reichswehr (armed forces) minister and rejected the appointment of Joseph Wirth from the left wing of the Centre Party as vice-chancellor (the position remained vacant under Müller). The Centre, which did not want to see itself bound to full participation in the government, finally sent Theodor von Guérard as an "observer" to the cabinet, where he took over the post of minister of Transport. The DVP was also reluctant. Initially, it wanted to enter the government only if it was also allowed to participate in the Prussian government, demanding that the DVP be added to the Weimar coalition there. It took the intervention of the DVP's leading figure, Gustav Stresemann, who became foreign minister again under Müller, to convince the party to yield.

After the attempts to form a government had dragged on for weeks, Müller finally appeared before Parliament on 3 July 1928 with his policy statement. He was not, however, able to present a formal coalition government. It saw itself instead as a "cabinet of personalities", which meant that the parties from which the ministers came reserved the right to oppose parts of the government's policies. Many members of the Reichstag from the SPD also remained reserved about the new government. Their primary wish was to have the SPD ministers help the Reichstag membership and the party accomplish its goals. All in all, it was not possible to speak of broad support for the government from the parties involved. It was not until 13 April 1929 that the "cabinet of personalities" became a classic coalition government on the basis of a coalition agreement. Guérard resigned in order to allow greater ministerial participation by the Centre, which was represented by three ministers beginning in April 1929.

=== Members ===
The cabinet consisted of the following ministers:

Portfolio	Minister	Took office	Left office	Party
Chancellorship	Hermann Müller	28 June 1928	27 March 1930	SPD
Vice-Chancellorship	Vacant	–	–	–
Foreign Affairs	Gustav Stresemann	28 June 1928	† 3 October 1929	DVP
Foreign Affairs	Julius Curtius (acting)	4 October 1929	27 March 1930	DVP
Interior	Carl Severing	28 June 1928	27 March 1930	SPD
Justice	Erich Koch-Weser	28 June 1928	13 April 1929	DDP
Justice	Theodor von Guérard	13 April 1929	27 March 1930	Centre
Labour	Rudolf Wissell	28 June 1928	27 March 1930	SPD
Reichswehr	Wilhelm Groener	28 June 1928	27 March 1930	Independent
Economic Affairs	Julius Curtius	28 June 1928	11 November 1929	DVP
Economic Affairs	Paul Moldenhauer	12 November 1929	23 December 1929	DVP
Economic Affairs	Robert Schmidt	23 December 1929	27 March 1930	SPD
Finance	Rudolf Hilferding	28 June 1928	21 December 1929	SPD
Finance	Paul Moldenhauer	23 December 1929	27 March 1930	DVP
Food and Agriculture	Hermann Dietrich	28 June 1928	27 March 1930	DDP
Transport	Theodor von Guérard	28 June 1928	6 February 1929	Centre
Transport	Georg Schätzel (acting)	7 February 1929	12 April 1929	BVP
Transport	Adam Stegerwald	13 April 1929	27 March 1930	Centre
Postal Affairs	Georg Schätzel	28 June 1928	27 March 1930	BVP
Occupied Territories	Theodor von Guérard (acting)	28 June 1928	6 February 1929	Centre
Occupied Territories	Carl Severing (acting)	7 February 1929	12 April 1929	SPD
Occupied Territories	Joseph Wirth	13 April 1929	27 March 1930	Centre

== Domestic issues ==
=== Armored cruiser A ===
At the beginning of its term in office, the new cabinet was faced with a serious crisis over the armored cruiser A, both in the public eye and within the government. The Treaty of Versailles had imposed significant constraints on Germany's armaments, although the construction of new warships was not completely prohibited. The Reichswehr had vigorously pushed for the construction of armored cruisers under the Marx government, ostensibly to replace obsolete units. While the Reichsrat, Parliament's upper house led by Prussia, had spoken out against the construction in December 1927, the Reichstag, with the Bürgerblock parties in the majority, had voted in favor. The Reichsrat responded on 31 March 1928, the day of the Reichstag's dissolution, with a request to the cabinet, which was then acting only in a managing capacity, to approve the construction of the ship after 1 September 1928 and a renewed examination of the financial situation. In the 1928 Reichstag election campaign, the left-wing parties SPD and KPD had sharply criticised the plan and demanded that it be abandoned in favor of social projects. Their campaign slogan was "Food for children instead of armored cruisers". The DDP also considered the armored cruiser to be a prestige project for the German Navy that made little sense. During the coalition negotiations, the DVP had pushed for the construction of the ship and referred to the favorable vote in the previous Reichstag. The Centre had supported the DVP, but only half-heartedly, and the DDP had abstained. In order not to endanger the formation of the coalition, a decision on the cruiser was postponed.

The issue came up in the cabinet in August 1928 when Minister of the Armed Forces Wilhelm Groener submitted a motion to approve the first instalment for the construction of the armored cruiser. According to Minister of Finance Rudolf Hilferding (SPD), there were no financial objections. Groener threatened to resign if the project was obstructed by the new government, and rumors of an ensuing resignation of President Hindenburg increased the pressure on the Social Democratic cabinet members. They did not want to provoke a governmental or even a constitutional crisis so soon after taking office and, in the end, agreed to grant the funds.

The cabinet's decision met with fierce criticism among the SPD Reichstag membership and in the party as a whole. The KPD took advantage of the situation to launch a petition for a referendum against the construction of the armored cruiser. Pressured in this way, the SPD parliamentary contingent decided to submit a proposal to stop the project. The Reichstag vote on the motion on 15 November 1928 took place under strict party discipline, with the result that the three SPD ministers and the Chancellor himself had to vote against the government resolution that they had supported just weeks earlier in the cabinet. It amounted to a vote of no confidence in themselves. The middle class public held the vote against the Social Democrats, viewing it as an inability to govern. Joseph Wirth of the Centre Party spoke openly of a "creeping crisis of German parliamentarism". Moreover, the Social Democrats' votes could not prevent the granting of funds for the construction of the armored cruiser since the middle class parties were able to put together a majority against the SPD's motion to stop the project.

In mid-June 1929, the second instalment for armored cruiser A came up for discussion, although without causing similar public controversy. In the Reichstag, the KPD moved that the instalment be cancelled, and the SPD agreed. This time, however, the Social Democratic cabinet members were not bound by the constraints of party discipline. They voted against the KPD motion and were thus part of the Reichstag majority that approved the funding.

=== Ruhr iron dispute ===
The coalition had to deal with its first major social and economic crisis in the so-called Ruhr iron dispute, the "largest and longest lockout Germany had ever experienced". It took place in the iron and steel industry on the Rhine and Ruhr from October to December 1928.

The initial signs of the economic downturn prompted the regional metal employers' association to reject union demands for a wage increase. In the collective bargaining negotiations, it offered only an extension of the existing agreement, with a slight increase in pay for low-wage groups. When the bargaining parties were unable to reach an agreement, a state-appointed arbitrator, High Court Counsel Wilhelm Joetten, made a ruling on 26 October 1928. The trade unions accepted the arbitrator's decision, but the employers turned it down. In a legal procedure that had become common in 1923, the minister of labor, in this case the Social Democrat Rudolf Wissell, declared the arbitrator's award in such a situation universally binding. On 13 October 1928, the employers gave notice to their workforces effective as of 28 October, and on that date, closed the factories. Unlike in the past, they were not willing to accept an arbitrator's declaration of general applicability, with the result that on 1 November some 200,000 to 260,000 workers were locked out. 160,000 of them were not unionised and therefore without union support benefits. Benefits from unemployment insurance were not allowed.

The employers also took legal action against compulsory arbitration and declarations of general applicability. For them, the content of the arbitration award was less important than the procedure itself. They did not regard final decisions by a single person as appropriate. Above all, they considered the procedure of generalization to be an expression of wage fixing by the state. They thought that the social policy innovations of the Republic, which included the eight-hour day, autonomy in collective bargaining and the unemployment insurance introduced by the 1927 Act on Employment Services and Unemployment Insurance (AVAVG) – like declarations of general applicability to end collective disputes – were undesirable developments that should be rolled back. At a time when a Social Democratic-led government was once again established at the national level, the employers used the industrial action of lockouts to vigorously oppose "state wage determination". They had avoided such steps during the previous middle class governments.

Large sections of the press spoke out against the companies' actions. Bishops and professors organized collections for the locked out workers. Some cities in the eastern coalfields started to pay welfare benefits without first checking the recipients' individual needs and without linking the payments to a later obligation to repay. At the beginning of November, the SPD and the KPD presented motions in the Reichstag to provide state support to those who had been locked out, which were passed with a large majority against the votes of the DVP. It was not until 4 December that the lockout was lifted.

The experience led some employers in heavy industry to seek alternatives to parliamentary decision-making and to look increasingly to authoritarian forms of government. The partial successes that they had been able to achieve in the Ruhr iron dispute were not sufficient to bind them to the Reich's parliamentary system of government. Among the partial successes was that a special arbitrator, Minister of the Interior Carl Severing, overturned much of the labor minister's decision and on 21 December 1928 issued a special arbitration ruling that was lower than the one his ministerial colleague Wissell had declared binding. On 22 January 1929, the German Labor Court also issued a final ruling that was favorable to the employers. It declared that arbitration decisions were generally inadmissible and that the actual arbitration proceedings had been characterised by formal errors.

=== Young Plan ===
The 1929 Young Plan, a program for settling Germany's World War I reparations, established a schedule for paying 112 billion gold marks over a period of 59 years. Even though it lowered the previous total payments by 20%, nationalist parties such as the DNVP and Nazis opposed it, including with a referendum that proposed a "Law Against the Enslavement of the German People". Enough signatures were obtained to place the initiative on the ballot, but the vote failed due to low turnout. All parties of the coalition, with varying degrees of reservations, endorsed the Young Plan.

Partly parallel to the Young Plan, the German-Polish Liquidation Agreement was negotiated and adopted. It regulated the mutual waiver of financial claims by the two states and created legal security for the German minority in Poland. It was one of the few concrete steps towards normalising the relationship between Germany and Poland.

=== Financial issues ===
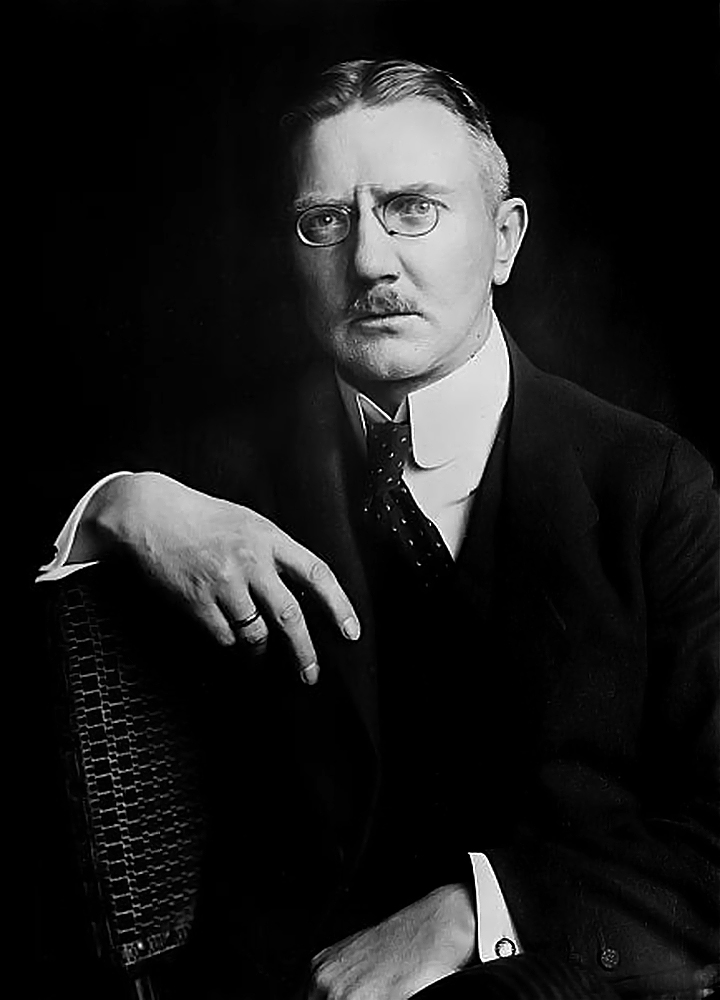
President of the Reichsbank Hjalmar Schacht

The government remained faced with serious financial problems. The parties on the opposite wings of the coalition – the DVP and SPD – were in particular unable to find workable compromises. Since all parties of the coalition wanted the Reichstag to accept the Young Plan, fundamental decisions of financial policy were postponed until after it was ratified on 12 March 1930.

The first problem concerned the dramatic difficulties with liquidity that, after the middle of 1929, confronted the German government at the end of each month and quarter. It was repeatedly faced with potential insolvency. The weakening domestic economy threw previous tax estimates into disarray and led to an increase in the number of unemployed, for which the unemployment insurance system was inadequately funded. The government had to constantly supply it with additional money.

The parties were also at odds on a second, more extensive set of issues. Their ideas on how to consolidate the budget and reduce the accumulated national debt were far apart. The DVP and the business associations supporting it called for spending cuts, especially to social programs such as unemployment insurance. If there had to be tax increases, they favored consumption taxes on such items as tobacco and alcohol. They were against increases in direct taxes on wealth and income. The SPD opposed raising consumption taxes. It saw them as an unacceptable burden on the masses that it did not want to support unless "the haves" also contributed their share to budget stabilisation.

The paths to the reform of fiscal policy were blocked by the same clashes of interests as those to tax reform. Who should and should not be burdened or relieved was disputed to such an extent that common approaches to action could not be found. Because he was unable to resolve the issues, Finance Minister Rudolf Hilferding resigned on 20 December 1929. The president of the Reichsbank, Hjalmar Schacht, had previously publicly denounced the government's financial policy as unsound and was subsequently able to insist that an additional 450 million Reichsmarks for debt reduction be raised in 1930. Schacht was able to push his plans through because the solution to the massive cash problem at the end of 1929 depended on the Reichsbank. Without the goodwill of its president, the necessary credit to solve the liquidity problem could not be secured in December.

== Unemployment insurance and end of the coalition ==
=== Radicalisation of the party landscape ===
During the time the coalition was in office, parts of the party landscape radicalised. Even the groups that supported parliamentarism and democracy were affected by the trends, at least indirectly.

The SPD had been subjected to sharp attacks from the left after the KPD adopted the theory of social fascism and increasingly made social democracy the main enemy. Even though the SPD was the leading force in the coalition, coalition fatigue steadily increased, especially on the party's left wing. In addition to criticism on the issue of the armored cruiser, fundamental skepticism about an alliance with right-wing parties also played a role. The SPD Reichstag deputy Max Seydewitz, later of the KPD and the Socialist Unity Party of East Germany, stated that coalition politics was "a great danger for social democracy, for the working class and for the existence of the Republic". Paul Levi, a co-founder of the KPD who had returned to the SPD, described the coalition as a "caricature of a government". Because they considered the existence of the Republic to be assured, part of the left was prepared to leave the responsibility for government to the middle class parties until a new revolutionary situation arose. Even though the majority of the party continued to back the government, such positions made it clear that there were considerable reservations within the SPD about continued participation in the government.

The Centre Party also moved significantly to the right with the election of Ludwig Kaas as its chairman on 29 December 1928. Kaas aligned the party more closely with the Catholic Church. He publicly expressed his approval of "Führerism in a grand style" and made several disparaging remarks about Stresemann's foreign policy, which he considered "finished". He wanted to make the Centre Party independent of the "unpredictability of parliamentary weather changes". His statements show that the party was in the process of moving away from republican positions.

=== Unemployment insurance ===
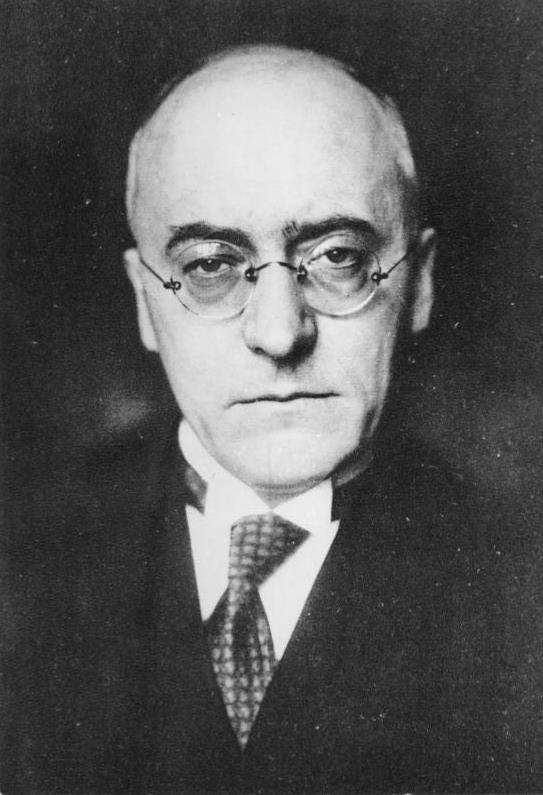
Heinrich Brüning, who followed Hermann Müller as chancellor. He led the first of the presidential cabinets.

The problem that ultimately caused the coalition to collapse was unemployment insurance. It had been introduced in 1927 and was designed to support a maximum of 800,000 unemployed. With the help of an emergency fund, another 600,000 could be provided. The beginning of the Great Depression in Germany quickly led to an increase in the number of unemployed, which swelled to three million in February 1930. The government was forced by law to make up the insurance deficit with additional funds from the national budget.

There were two potential solutions to the continually increasing demands of the unemployment insurance program. The trade unions and Social Democrats proposed an increase in the 3% contribution that was paid equally by employees and employers. The second option, preferred by employers and the DVP, was to cut benefits. They called for a constant contribution rate and tax relief that companies would use to build up equity capital. It was not until 21 December 1929 that the contribution rate was raised to 3.5%, but even this did not provide lasting relief given the rapidly rising number of unemployed.

The Social Democrats called for an additional increase in contributions and proposed a solidarity contribution from those with fixed salaries. Civil servants and employees in the public sector would contribute 3% of their salary towards restructuring unemployment insurance. The DVP rejected the idea and called for "internal reforms", i.e., cuts in benefits and a streamlined administration.

Heinrich Brüning, chairman of the Centre Party's parliamentary group, proposed a compromise on 27 March 1930. It postponed the question of reforming unemployment insurance until the autumn of 1930 and left open whether benefits would then be cut, contributions increased or taxes raised to subsidize unemployment insurance. Brüning's proposal also provided for a fixed subsidy by the Reich, limited in its amount from the outset and not rising if costs increased beyond it. The SPD Reichstag membership, including Labor Minister Wissell (SPD) and backed by executive representatives of the General German Trade Union Federation (ADGB), rejected Brüning's idea and continued to call for an increase in contributions and for the government to have a clear legal obligation to subsidize unemployment insurance sufficiently in emergency situations.

=== End of the Müller government ===
Although Chancellor Müller had campaigned for acceptance of the Brüning compromise, he bowed to his party's refusal to give ground on the matter. When Hindenburg denied his request to issue an emergency decree under Article 48 of the Weimar constitution, he handed in the resignation of the entire cabinet on the evening of 27 March 1930. Three days later, Hindenburg appointed Brüning chancellor. The Social Democratic ministers were replaced by conservatives and confidants of Hindenburg. Brüning was able to use the power of emergency decrees, which the President had withheld from Hermann Müller. In his government declaration, Brüning immediately made it clear that he would impose the decisions that he considered necessary without the Reichstag. He threatened to ask Hindenburg to dissolve it if it did not follow his lead.

For some time, the influential group around Hindenburg, members of the Reichswehr, leaders from heavy industry and large-scale agrarians had been looking for ways to establish a government without and against the Social Democrats. The accompanying weakening of Parliament was not an obstacle for them but a necessary and welcome part of the shift to the authoritarian presidential cabinets that followed Müller.

== Historians' judgments ==
It is only the end of the second Müller cabinet that is the subject of historical controversy. The key question is who bears the main responsibility for the breakup of the coalition in March 1930 and for the Reichstag losing so much political weight through the establishment of the presidential cabinets that followed it. The discussion of the Müller cabinet's end concerns both the initial conditions for the first Brüning cabinet and its significance.

Two theses stand opposite each other. The first was formulated primarily by Werner Conze (1910–1986), who argued that the crisis of the party system was the main reason for the failure of parliamentary governments. The coalition broke apart above all because the Social Democrats refused to compromise at the end of Müller's chancellorship. According to Conze, the coalition was not immediately followed by a systematic attempt to roll back parliamentarism, and Brüning had in fact tried to save the endangered German democracy.

The second, opposing thesis is based primarily on the work of Karl Dietrich Bracher (1922–2016). He interpreted Heinrich Brüning's chancellorship as the first stage in the dissolution of the Weimar Republic and assigned responsibility for the failure of parliamentarism to the old power elites – the president, the Reichswehr, big agriculture and heavy industry. Even before the end of the second Müller government, the positions of the old elites, which were critical of Parliament, had had a strong influence on the DVP, whose leadership worked resolutely until the end to replace the government that was supported by the Social Democrats. Under the Bracher thesis, the SPD's rejection of the Brüning compromise on 27 March 1930 is sometimes criticised as a tactical mistake but not as the reason for the failure of parliamentarism.

The research on the end of the coalition and the beginning of the presidential cabinets makes it clear overall how much the political willingness to compromise had lessened in all the parties of the coalition since the autumn of 1929. The studies also show that in the spring of 1930, an anti-parliamentary alternative to the government had been developed, above all by opponents of the Social Democrats in the circle around President Hindenburg, and that it had weakened the political position of the Reichstag as a whole. The first presidential cabinet under Brüning was thus not only a consequence of the failure of the coalition, but as a planned alternative government, it was also one of the causes of the failure.
