= Fourth Marx cabinet =

1927–1928 cabinet of Weimar Germany

Fourth Cabinet of Wilhelm Marx
- 15th Cabinet of Weimar Germany
- 29 January 1927 – 12 June 1928 (until 28 June 1928 as caretaker government)
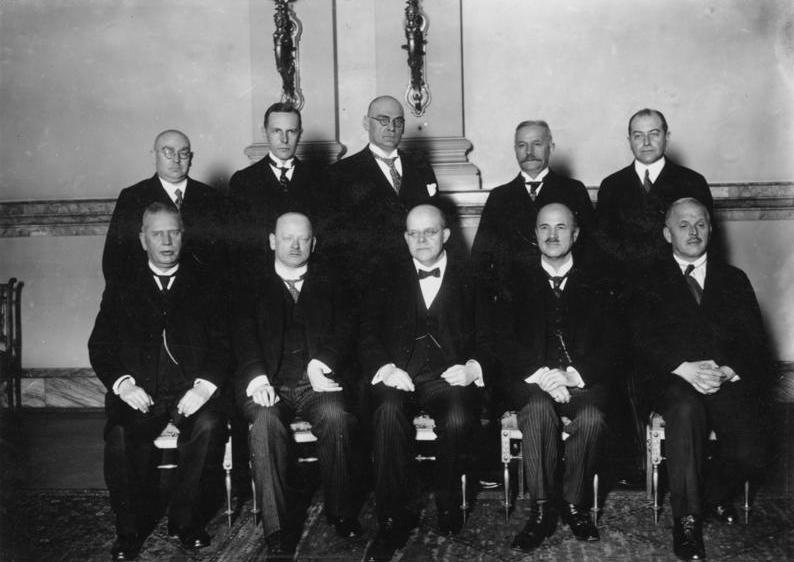
- Members of the cabinet
- Date formed: 29 January 1927
- Date dissolved: 28 June 1928 (1 year, 4 months and 30 days)

People and organisations
- President: Paul von Hindenburg
- Chancellor: Wilhelm Marx
- Vice Chancellor: Oskar Hergt
- Member parties: Centre Party; German People's Party; Bavarian People's Party; German National People's Party
- Status in legislature: Minority coalition government
- Opposition parties: Communist Party; Nazi Party

History
- Election: December 1924 federal election
- Legislature term: 3rd Reichstag of the Weimar Republic
- Predecessor: Third Marx cabinet
- Successor: Second Müller cabinet

The fourth Marx cabinet, headed by Wilhelm Marx of the Centre Party, was the 15th democratically elected government during the Weimar Republic. On 29 January 1927, it replaced the third Marx cabinet, which had resigned after information concerning clandestine operations by Germany's armed forces, the Reichswehr, had come to light.

The governing coalition was made up of four right of centre parties. It cooperated with the Reichswehr in keeping silent about its prohibited activities and passed important labour laws that required overtime pay for more than eight hours of work in a day. In its efforts to finalise a school law left open by the Weimar Constitution, the cabinet was unable to find consensus, and the coalition broke apart.

The fourth Marx cabinet resigned on 12 June 1928 but stayed on as a caretaker government until 28 June. The second cabinet of Hermann Müller of the Social Democratic Party (SPD) took office the next day.

== Formation ==
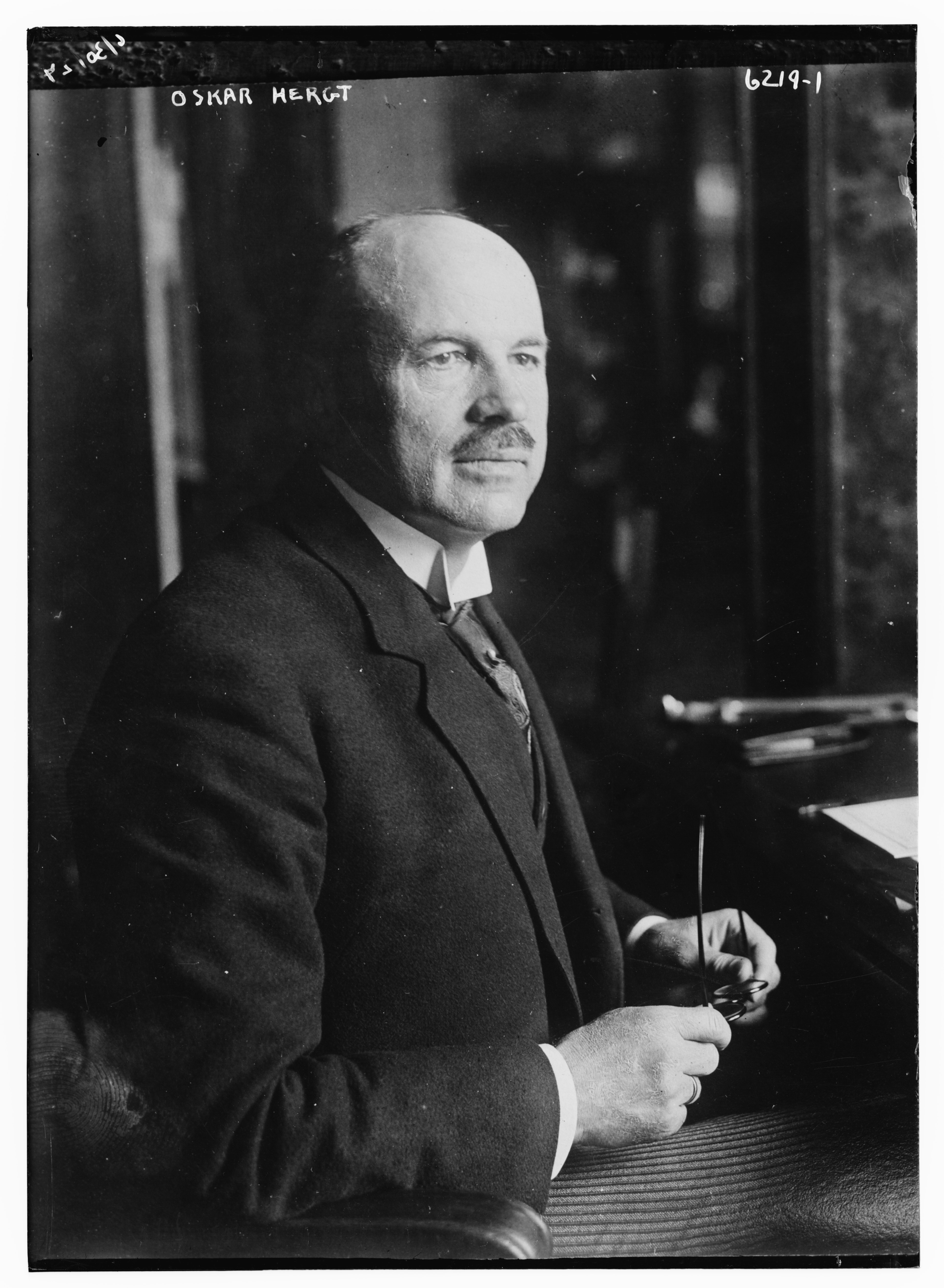
Oskar Hergt (DNVP), Vice-Chancellor and Minister of Justice

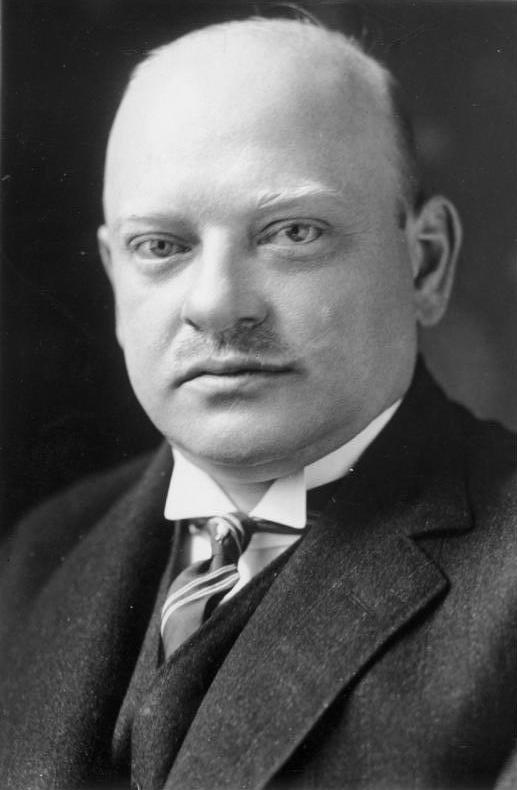
Gustav Stresemann (DVP), Minister of Foreign Affairs

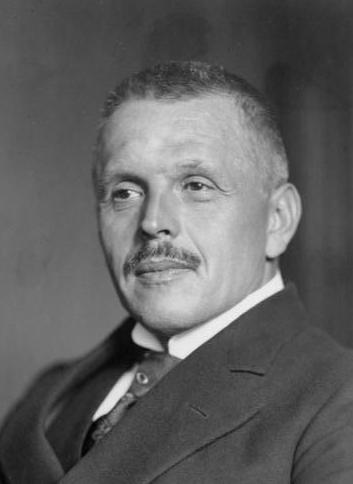
Otto Gessler (Ind.), Reichswehr Minister

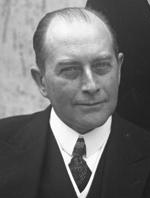
Julius Curtius (DVP), Minister of Economic Affairs

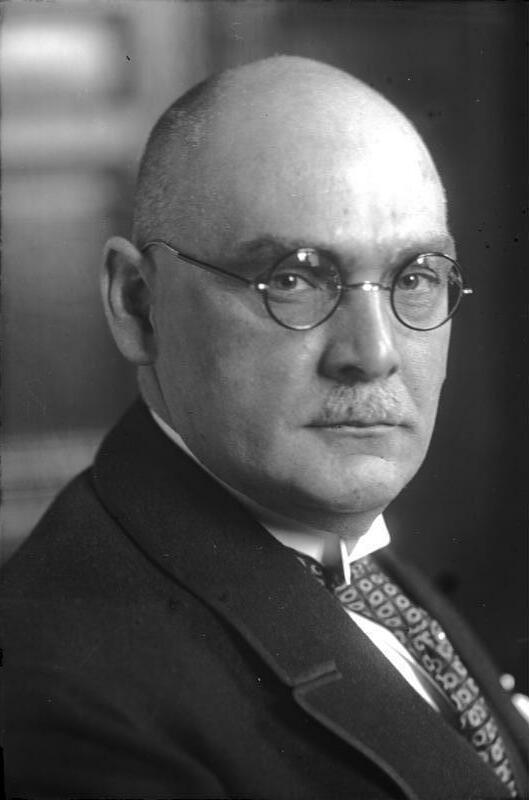
Heinrich Köhler (Centre), Minister of Finance

The third Marx cabinet resigned after it came to light that the Reichswehr had secret contacts with far-right and Freikorps organizations such as Der Stahlhelm and that it was secretly cooperating with the Red Army of the Soviet Union to develop weapons that the Treaty of Versailles had prohibited Germany from having. On 17 December 1926, the government lost a vote of no confidence that the Social Democrats (SPD) introduced in the Reichstag.

Because of the role the SPD played in bringing down the previous government, it was not considered in the coalition talks to form a new government. President Paul von Hindenburg wanted to see a more conservative cabinet, and the right-wing nationalist German National People's Party (DNVP) was eager to return to a place in the government. After several attempts to build a coalition had failed, Marx and the Centre Party drew up a set of guidelines for participation in a new cabinet. They included the stipulations that all parties guarantee their support of the constitutional republican form of government and agree to a continuation of Germany's previous foreign policy. There were also policy outlines regarding the armed forces, school law and social issues. The DNVP, German People's Party (DVP), Centre Party and Bavarian People's Party (BVP) agreed to Marx's conditions, but the German Democratic Party (DDP) refused to join the coalition because it found their school policy too favourable towards denominational schools.

== Members ==
The cabinet consisted of the following ministers:

Portfolio	Minister	Took office	Left office	Party
Chancellorship	Wilhelm Marx	29 January 1927	28 June 1928	Centre
Vice-Chancellorship	Oskar Hergt	31 January 1927	28 June 1928	DNVP
Foreign Affairs	Gustav Stresemann	29 January 1927	28 June 1928	DVP
Interior	Walter von Keudell	31 January 1927	28 June 1928	DNVP
Justice	Oskar Hergt	31 January 1927	28 June 1928	DNVP
Labour	Heinrich Brauns	29 January 1927	28 June 1928	Centre
Reichswehr	Otto Gessler (Note: In order to stay on as Reichswehr minister when the German Democratic Party refused to join the fourth Marx cabinet, Gessler left the party and became an independent. He was later forced to resign as a result of the Lohmann Affair.)	29 January 1927	19 January 1928	Independent
Reichswehr	Wilhelm Groener	20 January 1928	28 June 1928	Independent
Economic Affairs	Julius Curtius	29 January 1927	28 June 1928	DVP
Finance	Heinrich Köhler	29 January 1927	28 June 1928	Centre
Food and Agriculture	Martin Schiele	29 January 1927	28 June 1928	DNVP
Transport	Wilhelm Koch	29 January 1927	27 June 1928	DNVP
Postal Affairs	Georg Schätzel	29 January 1927	28 June 1928	BVP
Occupied Territories	Wilhelm Marx (acting)	29 January 1927	28 June 1928	Centre

== Issues of foreign and domestic policy ==
In light of the revelations that had brought down Marx's previous cabinet, the Reichswehr's leadership decided that it needed to cooperate more closely with the government. On 26 February 1927, it revealed to Marx and his cabinet its strategic vision and armament status, including the aspects that were illegal under the Treaty of Versailles. Marx agreed to keep the plans secret and to take responsibility for them as long as the Reichswehr remained willing to be open about its activities. In spite of the secretive nature of the cooperation, it was a step towards putting the civilian government in more control of the military.

Later in the year, a Berlin newspaper revealed a secret rearmament program that was uncovered during the bankruptcy proceedings of a film production company. Called the Lohmann Affair, it led to the dismissal of two high-ranking naval officials, including Hans Zenker, head of the German Navy, who had been at the 26 February meeting with the cabinet, and to the resignation of Reichswehr Minister Otto Gessler. As a result of the scandal, which the cabinet kept under wraps as much as it could, the government determined that in the future, all secret military expenditures were to be dependent on governmental approval.

In foreign policy, the cabinet's main goal was the withdrawal of occupation forces from Rhineland, an issue that was a particularly high priority for the DNVP. In March 1927, French troops in the Saarland were replaced by a railway protection force, but the DNVP remained unhappy with Foreign Minister Gustav Stresemann's policy of waiting and compromising. In the fall, in fulfilment of a promise first made in 1925, occupying forces in the Rhineland were reduced by about 10,000 men. Most Germans viewed the step unfavourably because it had been delayed too long and was inadequate in scope. There was little prospect for further reductions, since France saw the troops as its guarantee for German adherence to the terms of the Treaty of Versailles in other matters such as reparations payments.

In the policy statement for his fourth government, Chancellor Marx had said that fighting unemployment, passing unemployment insurance and shortening working hours were top priorities. The Reichstag succeeded in passing an overtime law that allowed more than eight hours of work per day only if sanctioned by a collective agreement or "official authorisation". In addition, overtime had to be compensated by supplemental pay of at least 25%. There was resistance from industry to the corresponding changeover from a system of two shifts to three shifts per day, but it was nevertheless implemented in some heavy industrial concerns with the use of a binding declaration from the government. On 7 July 1927, the Reichstag overwhelmingly passed an unemployment compensation law that combined unemployment insurance and job placement into one department with local subdivisions that were made up of representatives of employers, employees and regional public authorities. It was "the last stone in the foundation of German social insurance".

The Law for the Protection of the Republic, which had been passed following the assassination of Foreign Minister Walther Rathenau by right-wing extremists on 24 June 1922, was extended for 2 years in May 1927 with the votes of the DNVP, which had originally voted against it. The law banned organisations that opposed the "constitutional republican form of government," along with their printed materials and meetings.

== The school law and the end of the government ==
The Weimar Constitution, in Article 147 paragraph 2, had left the detailed regulation of school law to be "prescribed by state legislation on the basis of a national law", but the law had never been written. Marx's inability to pass one as promised brought down his government. The proposed legislation was intended to guarantee the fundamental equality of interdenominational, confessional and secular schools. The Centre Party, BVP and DNVP were in general agreement with the proposed law, but the DVP had reservations about it. They wanted to secure the primacy of the interdenominational schools and limit the church's voice in determining religious instruction.

When talks collapsed on 15 February 1928, the Centre Party declared the coalition dissolved but agreed to continue work until 1 April on crucial issues such as the budget. At the urging of President Paul von Hindenburg, the Reichstag passed an emergency labour programme that included subsidies for invalid pensioners, aid for agriculture and a liquidation damages act that provided compensation for property and financial losses suffered by both individuals and companies that were due to liquidations during the war or as a result of the Treaty of Versailles. The outgoing Marx government also passed the 1928 budget and a supplementary budget for the emergency package.

The Reichstag was dissolved on 31 March 1928 and a new Reichstag election was held on 20 May. The Marx cabinet stayed in office until 28 June, after which it was succeeded by the second Müller cabinet.
