= Third Marx cabinet =

1926–1927 cabinet of Weimar Germany

Third Cabinet of Wilhelm Marx
- 14th Cabinet of Weimar Germany
- 17 May 1926 – 17 December 1926 (until 29 January 1927 as caretaker government)
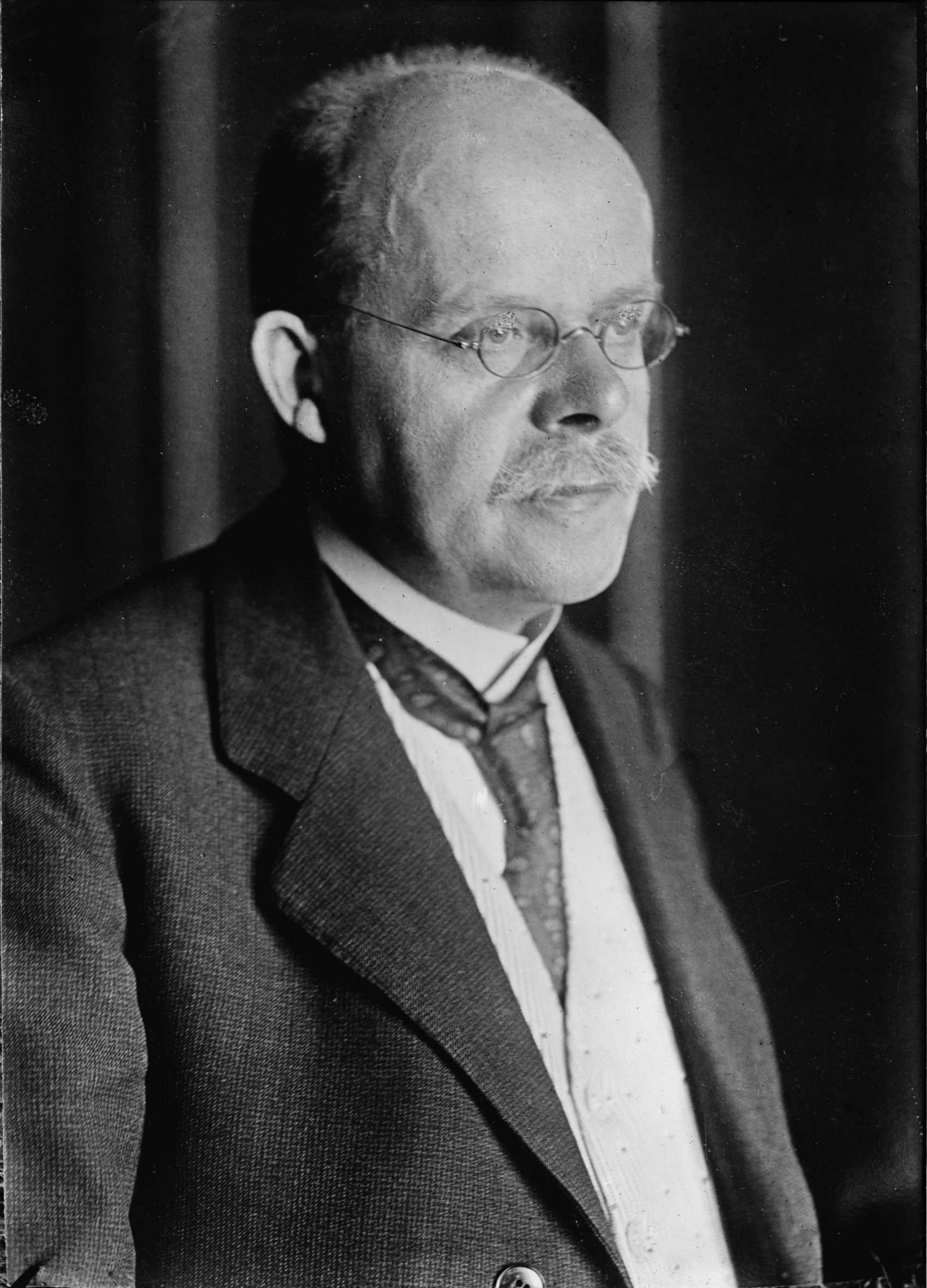
- Chancellor Wilhelm Marx
- Date formed: 17 May 1926
- Date dissolved: 29 January 1927 (8 months and 12 days)

People and organisations
- President: Paul von Hindenburg
- Chancellor: Wilhelm Marx
- Member parties: Centre Party; German People's Party; German Democratic Party; Bavarian People's Party
- Status in legislature: Minority coalition government
- Opposition parties: Communist Party; Nazi Party

History
- Election: December 1924 federal election
- Legislature term: 3rd Reichstag of the Weimar Republic
- Predecessor: Second Luther cabinet
- Successor: Fourth Marx cabinet

The third Marx cabinet, headed by Wilhelm Marx of the Centre Party, was the 14th democratically elected government during the Weimar Republic. On 17 May 1926, it replaced the second Luther cabinet after the resignation of Chancellor Hans Luther (independent) four days earlier. The Reichstag had passed a vote of censure against him for supporting a decree that permitted flying a German trade flag with the colours of the former German Empire in certain mostly overseas locations. The new Marx cabinet was a four-party centrist minority government.

The cabinet came into office facing high unemployment and dwindling cash reserves, but the economy had improved considerably by the time it resigned. It opposed a referendum on the expropriation of Germany's princes, which failed to pass in the popular vote. On the international front, Germany obtained a permanent seat on the Council of the League of Nations and regained some of its lost sovereignty after negotiating the withdrawal of the Military Inter-Allied Commission of Control.

Marx and his cabinet resigned on 17 December 1926 as a result of anger in the Reichstag over secret activities by the German military. It remained in office as a caretaker government until Marx formed his fourth cabinet on 29 January 1927.

== Establishment ==
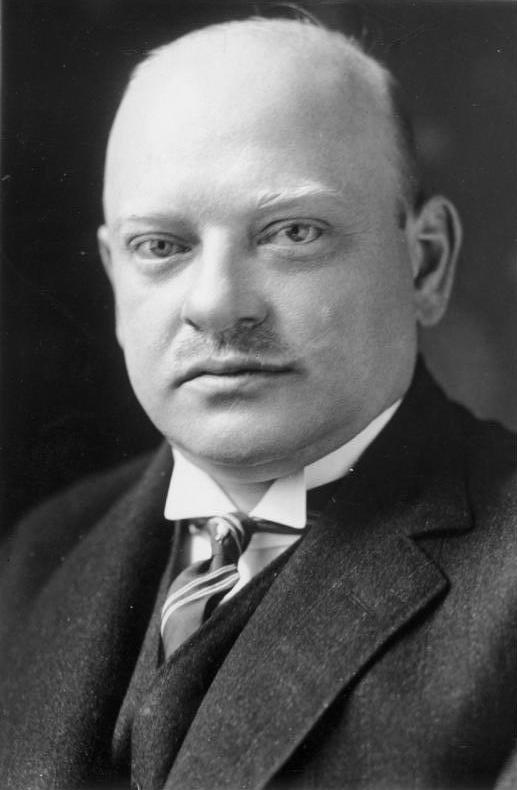
Gustav Stresemann, Minister of Foreign Affairs

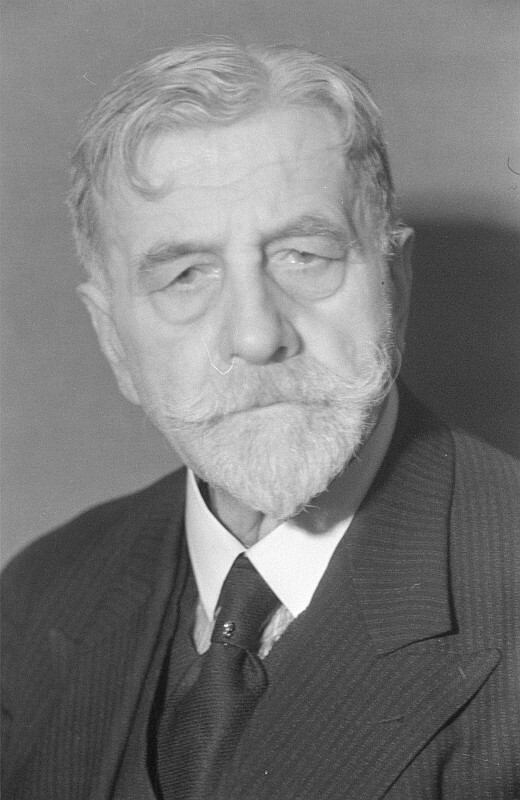
Wilhelm Külz, Minister of the Interior

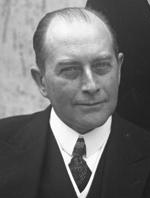
Julius Curtius, Minister of Economic Affairs

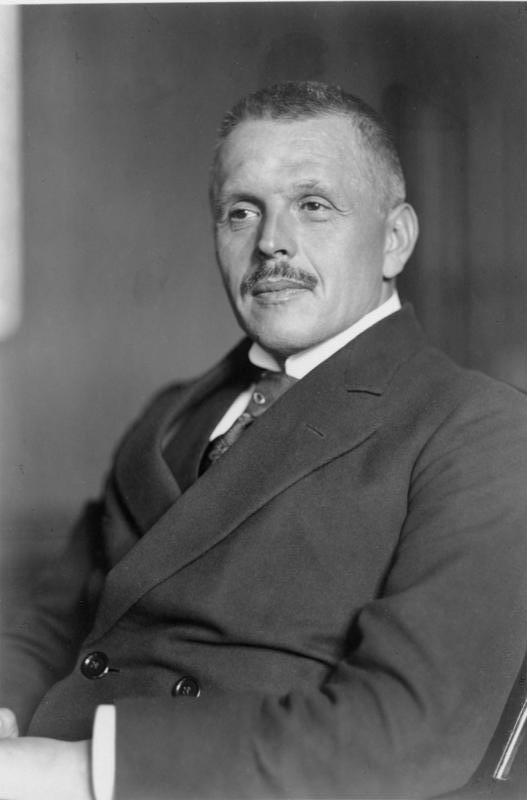
Otto Gessler, Reichswehr Minister

Chancellor Hans Luther (an independent) resigned on 13 May 1926 following a controversy over allowing the use in certain foreign locations of the black-white-red trade flag, which was similar to the former imperial flag.

When Luther refused to remain in office in a caretaker capacity, President Paul von Hindenburg appointed Reichswehr Minister Otto Gessler of the German Democratic Party (DDP) interim chancellor and asked him to form a new government. Since the Social Democratic Party (SPD) was unwilling to tolerate a minority cabinet led by Gessler, the parliamentary group of the Centre Party then asked Konrad Adenauer, mayor of Cologne, to come to Berlin. Adenauer was unwilling to build a temporary minority cabinet as a stepping stone to an eventual grand coalition and wanted instead to create a majority government that included the SPD. Speaking for the German People's Party (DVP), its parliamentary leader Ernst Scholz refused to entertain the idea of a coalition with the SPD for the foreseeable future due to domestic policy disagreements. He would rather have seen a move to include the right-wing German National People's Party (DNVP) in a future government and as a possible interim move towards a "neutral" technocratic cabinet with no links to the SPD. Adenauer therefore gave up his efforts within a day of having started the talks (15 May).

The same day, during a meeting of the caretaker cabinet, Gustav Stresemann (DVP) mentioned Minister of Justice Wilhelm Marx (Centre) as a potential new chancellor. In the evening, Hindenburg asked Marx to form a new cabinet. Before the Centre Party was willing to agree, they asked the DVP for clarification regarding the outlook for an eventual majority government. The parliamentary groups of the two parties came to an agreement on 16 May. It stated the intent of both sides to expand the coalition as soon as possible to make up a majority in the Reichstag, with the stipulation that the only parties that they would consider were those that accepted the binding nature of current international agreements and that supported the government's foreign policy. The DVP hoped for an eventual compromise on the part of the DNVP regarding its opposition to Stresemann's foreign policy that would allow its inclusion in the government. The DDP and Centre viewed the new minority government as a stand-in until a majority, including the SPD, could be formed.

A day later, a new cabinet was announced. All the ministers of the second Luther cabinet kept their positions. Marx left the Justice and Occupied Territories portfolios vacant (with himself as caretaker) in case the grand coalition should prove possible once the referendum on the expropriation of the princes was out of the way. Only when that hope proved elusive due to the opposition of the Social Democrats to the government's position on the expropriation issue did Marx appoint Johannes Bell (Centre) as minister of Justice and ask him to serve as caretaker for the Occupied Territories.

== Members ==
The cabinet consisted of the following ministers:

Portfolio	Minister	Took office	Left office	Party
Chancellorship	Wilhelm Marx	17 May 1926	29 January 1927	Centre
Vice-Chancellorship	Vacant	–	–	–
Foreign Affairs	Gustav Stresemann	17 May 1926	29 January 1927	DVP
Interior	Wilhelm Külz	17 May 1926	29 January 1927	DDP
Justice	Wilhelm Marx (acting)	17 May 1926	16 July 1926	Centre
Justice	Johannes Bell	17 July 1926	29 January 1927	Centre
Labour	Heinrich Brauns	17 May 1926	29 January 1927	Centre
Reichswehr	Otto Gessler	17 May 1926	29 January 1927	DDP
Economic Affairs	Julius Curtius	17 May 1926	29 January 1927	DVP
Finance	Peter Reinhold	17 May 1926	29 January 1927	DDP
Food and Agriculture	Heinrich Haslinde	17 May 1926	29 January 1927	Centre
Transport	Rudolf Krohne	17 May 1926	29 January 1927	DVP
Postal Affairs	Karl Stingl	17 May 1926	29 January 1927	BVP
Occupied Territories	Wilhelm Marx (acting)	17 May 1926	16 July 1926	Centre
Occupied Territories	Johannes Bell (acting)	17 July 1926	29 January 1927	Centre

== In office ==
The number of unemployed when the cabinet took office was 1.8 million. Because the preceding Luther cabinet had lowered taxes in an attempt to stimulate the economy, the Marx government was faced with a significant shortfall in revenue. Finance Minister Peter Reinhold, however, had little success in convincing the other cabinet members to hold to strict spending limits in the face of the country's dwindling cash reserves, which were due largely to the high costs of unemployment benefits. Labour Minister Brauns passed a bill to create jobs through public sector orders that would make use of idle production capacity in key industries, but by the time the programmes were ready to be implemented in the fall of 1926, an upturn in the economy had made the need for them questionable. Attempts to reduce working hours and increase unemployment pay made little progress due to disagreements between parties.

The move to expropriate the property of the former princes of the German Empire which had begun under the second Luther cabinet came to a head in 1926. The Communist Party of Germany (KPD) and the SPD supported a popular referendum to expropriate the property without compensation, with the money to be used to help the unemployed, war victims and others in need. The petition for a referendum on the expropriation obtained enough support for it to be presented to the Reichstag. With only the KPD and SPD voting in favour, the expropriation law proposed in the petition failed to pass, which opened the way for the referendum. The Marx government took a stand against it on the grounds that it was unconstitutional and a breach of the rights to private property and equality before the law. The June 20 popular vote on the referendum failed to pass in spite of the overwhelming vote in favour because too few people cast a ballot to reach the required threshold of 50% of all eligible voters. A compromise bill was then put before the Reichstag that laid out general guidelines for expropriation with compensation and gave the states the power to decide the final terms. Since the bill required a two-thirds majority to pass and the SPD remained opposed, the bill was withdrawn in order to spare the government a defeat.

On 8 September 1926, the League of Nations admitted Germany as a member with a permanent seat on the Council, giving it the status of a major European power. The Marx cabinet was also able to negotiate the withdrawal of the Military Inter-Allied Commission of Control. It had been set up at the end of World War I to oversee Germany's conversion of its armaments production to commercial use. Its liquidation was seen as an important step for Germany in regaining full sovereignty.

Hans von Seeckt, head of the Reichswehr Army Command, was forced to resign after he allowed the Hohenzollern Prince Wilhelm of Prussia to take part in military manoeuvres. Seeckt's successor, General Wilhelm Heye, wanted a better relationship with the government in order to be able to carry out the Reichswehr's secret plans to expand the army beyond the restrictions in the Treaty of Versailles, and also because the SPD was criticising the Reichswehr's degree of autonomy. On 6 December, the SPD gave Reichswehr Minister Gessler evidence showing activities prohibited by the Treaty of Versailles in which the Reichswehr was involved. They included using right-wing military associations to build a clandestine army reserve, procuring off-budget funds from the business community and cooperating with the Soviet Red Army in producing poison gas and building a military aircraft factory in Soviet Russia.

== Resignation ==
Information about the activities caused the SPD to cancel its cooperation agreement with the government on 9 December. The cabinet sought to avoid a conflict by initiating negotiations that would result in a grand coalition that included the SPD. On 15 December, the talks seemed to be making progress, but that evening the SPD's parliamentary group voted to make the voluntary resignation of the cabinet a pre-condition for any formal discussions about a grand coalition. The proposal was rejected by the cabinet and the parties supporting it.

On 16 December, Philipp Scheidemann of the SPD gave a speech in the Reichstag in which he blasted the secret Reichswehr activities and announced a vote of no confidence. The parties of the right called him a traitor, but on 17 December, the vote of no confidence put forward by the SPD was supported by the DNVP and the KPD. The cabinet resigned and was asked by the President to remain in office in a caretaker capacity. It took until 29 January to form a new cabinet. Wilhelm Marx then became the head of a new government, the fourth Marx cabinet.
