= Hermann Dietrich =

German politician (1879–1954)

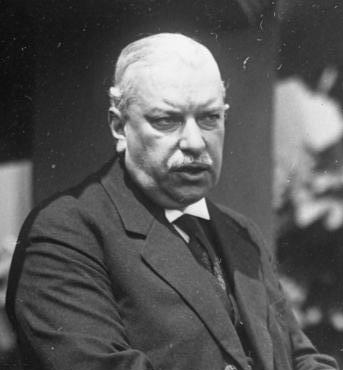
- Dietrich in 1930

Vice-Chancellor of Germany
- In office 30 March 1930 – 1 June 1932
- Chancellor: Heinrich Brüning
- Preceded by: Oskar Hergt (1928)
- Succeeded by: Franz von Papen (1933)

Chairman of the German State Party
- In office 28 July 1930 – 28 June 1933
- Preceded by: Party established
- Succeeded by: Party abolished

Reich Minister of Finance
- In office 26 June 1930 – 1 June 1932
- Chancellor: Heinrich Brüning
- Preceded by: Heinrich Brüning (acting)
- Succeeded by: Lutz Schwerin von Krosigk

Reich Minister for Food and Agriculture
- In office 28 June 1928 – 27 March 1930
- Chancellor: Hermann Müller
- Preceded by: Martin Schiele
- Succeeded by: Martin Schiele

Member of the Reichstag
- In office 24 June 1920 – 7 July 1933
- Constituency: DStP National List (1932-1933); Baden (1920-1932)

Personal details
- Born: Hermann Robert Dietrich; 14 December 1879 Elzach, Grand Duchy of Baden, German Empire
- Died: 6 March 1954 (aged 74) Stuttgart, Baden-Württemberg, West Germany
- Party: German State Party
- Other political affiliations: National Liberal Party (1911-1918); German Democratic Party (1918–1930)
- Occupation: Politician

Hermann Robert Dietrich (14 December 1879 – 6 March 1954) was a German politician of the liberal German Democratic Party and served as a minister during the Weimar Republic.

== Biography ==
=== Early life ===
Born in Elzach, Baden, he studied law before serving as a legal advisor in Karlsruhe. He was Burgomaster of Kehl from 1908–1914 and Mayor of Konstanz throughout World War 1.

=== Political career ===
In 1911 he was elected to Baden’s Landtag as a National Liberal. A founding member of the DDP, he joined the Reichstag in January 1919. Although he was Badens' as Minister for Reich and Foreign Affairs until 1920 he in the Reichstag at the same time. He retained his seat in the Reichstag until all parties but the NSDAP were dissolved in 1933.

In 1930, Dietrich succeeded Paul Moldenhauer as Finance Minister of the Weimar Republic. In the midst of the Great Depression, Dietrich became the "chief proponent" of government contracts in 1930 in an attempt to offset the drastic increase in unemployment. Because the contracts were contingent on the reduction of prices, he and the Provisional National Economic Council had to authorize the reduction of wages in the German industrial community. Dietrich, along with the Chancellor Heinrich Brüning and Minister of Labour Adam Stegerwald, all of whom had studied economics, believed that accelerating the pace of agricultural resettlement would solve unemployment. He was initially opposed to the deflationary policy pushed by Brüning, but later changed his position and said it was a "necessary measure" along with the cut in civil workers' salaries. During President Paul von Hindenburg's bid for re-election, Dietrich was one of few elites in the cabinet barred from speaking at the president's candidacy campaigns for allegedly being "too far left". After the collapse of the Second Brüning cabinet, Dietrich lost his ministry due to his opposition to Franz Von Papen.

Throughout his political career Dietrich was an advocate for the peasantry and rural middle classes, he supported a Social market economy, he supported agricultural tariffs in 1925, and was a steady sponsor of Osthilfe for economically struggling Junkers. Dietrich was a German Nationalist and among the more conservative members of the DDP, he as such he was softly opposed to the Young Plan.

He personally opposed the Enabling Act, but the DStP voted to support the act so in name of party unity he did so.

=== Post-Weimar Republic ===
In 1933 Dietrich resumed his legal practice and lived in the Black Forest. In 1945 he became a founding member of the Free Democratic Party.
