= Reich Ministry for the Occupied Territories =

Weimar Germany ministry

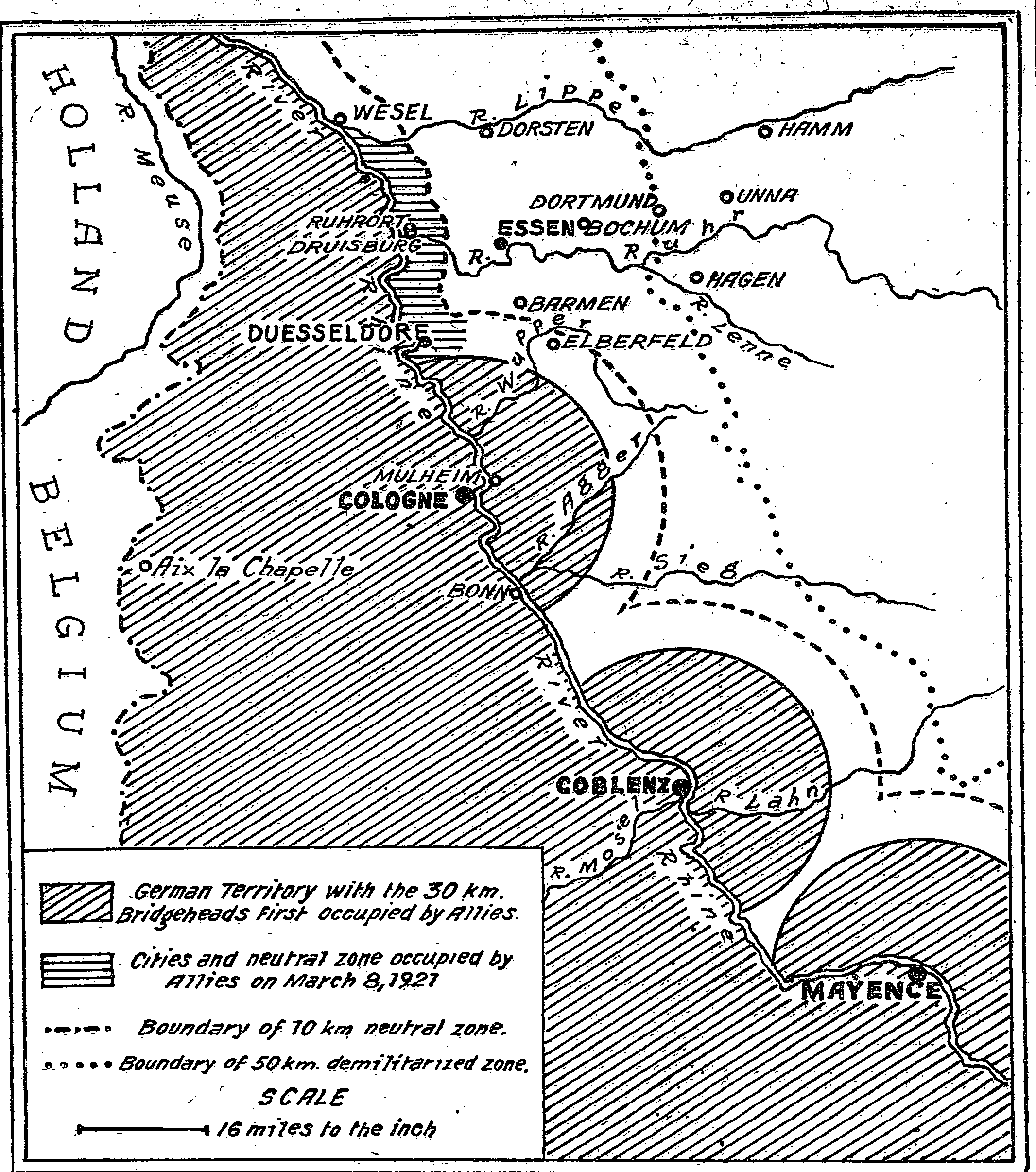
The occupied areas of the Rhineland and the 3 bridgeheads east of the Rhine River

The Reich Ministry for the Occupied Territories (German: Reichsministerium für die besetzten Gebiete) was a cabinet-level ministry of the Weimar Republic from 24 August 1923 to 30 September 1930. It was responsible for the administration of both the Rhineland region occupied by the Allies under the terms of the Treaty of Versailles and of the Ruhr after it was occupied by the French and Belgians in January 1923. The Ministry is not to be confused with Reich Ministry for the Occupied Eastern Territories that existed under the National Socialists.

== Background ==
In December 1918, French, Belgian and British troops occupied parts of the Rhineland and neighboring areas in Hesse, Hesse-Nassau and the Palatinate. The Treaty of Versailles, which came into effect on 10 January 1920, defined the left bank of the Rhine and the bridgeheads of Cologne, Koblenz and Mainz as an Allied zone of occupation. As a result of disputes over German reparations payments required by the Treaty, French and Belgian troops occupied the Ruhr in January 1923.

== Foundation ==
The Reich Ministry of the Interior began to assume responsibility for administering the occupied areas of the Rhineland soon after foreign troops entered. By the spring of 1923, its Department IV had twelve sub-departments that were responsible for general political and economic affairs in the Rhineland. They included the relations of German authorities with occupying authorities, culture and welfare, agriculture and nutrition, municipal and housing affairs, transportation, the civil service and the Saar region. After the occupation of the Ruhr, an additional department was established with oversight in the Ruhr area over the collection of intelligence, occupation costs, personal injury and property damage, welfare measures for civil servants and expelled and displaced persons, and cooperation on economic, transportation, social policy and cultural issues. On 1 April 1923, the Reich Treasury Administration for the Occupied Territories became part of the Interior Ministry as Department R. Its responsibilities included financing occupation costs and providing compensation for expellees.

During the chancellorship of Gustav Stresemann, the Reich Ministry for the Occupied Territories was formally established as a separate ministry by decree of Reich President Friedrich Ebert on 27 August 1923. The reason for the new ministry was more political than administrative. Strengthening the occupied territories was seen as a necessary step following the unrest that took place after the occupation of the Ruhr. A bill introduced by the Centre Party to set up the ministry was adopted unanimously by the Reichstag. Unlike the other Reich ministries, the Reich Ministry for the Occupied Territories was a regional ministry that co-administered other responsibilities in its area.

The presidential decree that established the new ministry simply transferred the responsibilities of the existing Department IV and Department R of the Interior Ministry to the new ministry to be headed by a Reich minister for the occupied territories.

After the end of the Allied occupation of the Rhineland on 30 June 1930, the Ministry was dissolved.

== Ministers ==
Ministers for the occupied territories were officially named only under the first and second cabinets of Gustav Stresemann, the second of Hermann Müller and the first of Heinrich Brüning. The others sat in the cabinets in an acting capacity.

Chancellor	Cabinet	Year	Minister	Party
Gustav Stresemann	I and II	1923	Johannes Fuchs	Centre
Wilhelm Marx	I and II	1923–1925	Anton Höfle	Centre
Hans Luther	I	1925	Josef Frenken; Hans Luther	Centre; Independent
	II	1926	Wilhelm Marx	Centre
Wilhelm Marx	III	1926–1927	Johannes Bell	Centre
	IV	1927–1928	Wilhelm Marx	Centre
Hermann Müller	II	1928–1930	Theodor von Guérard; Carl Severing; Joseph Wirth	Centre; SPD; Centre
Heinrich Brüning	I	1930–1931	Gottfried Treviranus	KVP
