= Presidential cabinets of the Weimar Republic =

Series of government of the Weimar Republic

The presidential cabinets (German: Präsidialkabinette) were a succession of governments of the Weimar Republic whose legitimacy derived exclusively from presidential emergency decrees. From April 1930 to January 1933, three chancellors, Heinrich Brüning, Franz von Papen, and Kurt von Schleicher were appointed by President Paul von Hindenburg, and governed without the consent of the Reichstag, Germany's lower house of parliament. After Schleicher's tenure, the leader of the Nazis Adolf Hitler succeeded to the chancellorship and regained the consent of the Reichstag by obtaining a majority in the March 1933 German federal election with DNVP.

Article 48 of the Weimar Constitution gave the President of Germany (Reichspräsident) the power to pass emergency measures which did not require parliamentary support, as long as the chancellor or competent national minister approved of them. After a grand coalition led by chancellor Hermann Müller collapsed, President Paul von Hindenburg appointed the Centre Party politician Heinrich Brüning to the chancellorship. Since Brüning did not command a majority in parliament, he governed exclusively through the president's emergency powers. When the government suffered a parliamentary defeat, Hindenburg dissolved the Reichstag to enable Brüning to stay in office.

During Brüning's time in office, Adolf Hitler and his Nazi Party became an influential force in German politics. Brüning legislated to oppose the party's paramilitary activity but was replaced with Franz von Papen, a conservative advisor of the president, who sought to compromise with the forces of the radical right. His short-lived presidential government saw the NSDAP gain the largest share of seats in parliament in the election of July 1932. Unable to overcome parliamentary obstruction, he was succeeded by Kurt von Schleicher, who, in turn, was followed by Hitler on 30 January 1933.

The presidential cabinets have been interpreted as a result of the skepticism towards parliamentary government in German society as well as a fundamental shift in political practice towards a strong presidential ruler. Hindenburg's decision to govern without the support of the Reichstag constitutes a milestone on Germany's progression from a multi-party democracy to a totalitarian dictatorship under Hitler.

== Background ==
=== Article 48 ===
The Weimar Constitution of 1919 introduced the office of President of Germany (Reichspräsident), a directly elected head of state with a term length of 7 years. The office was given far-reaching prerogatives, including powers to appoint the federal government and to dissolve the Reichstag, the lower house of Germany's legislature. Through Article 48 of the constitution, the President could use emergency powers which did not require parliamentary support as long as his appointed chancellor or the "competent national minister" (Article 50) approved of them. The power to appoint pliable governments and to dissolve parliament should those governments lose its support meant that Presidents could, in effect, govern solely on the basis of Article 48.

=== Government of Hermann Müller ===
The 1928 German federal election yielded a fractured parliament in which no single party could command a governing majority. The Social Democratic Party (SPD) had gained the most seats while parties right of centre suffered significant losses. SPD politician Hermann Müller became Reichskanzler (chancellor) at the helm of an informal grand coalition including his own party, as well as the Catholic Centre Party, the liberal German People's Party (DVP) and German Democratic Party (DDP). Although the parties of Müller's government had little in common on domestic matters, their principal aim was to guarantee the passage of the Young Plan, an agreement between Germany and the Allies of World War I reducing the amount of war reparations owed.

After the Young Plan was accepted by parliament in early March 1930, the government struggled to find a unified approach to the social and economic challenges posed by the onset of the Great Depression. Differences between the SPD and the DVP became irreconcilable after the latter had begun to align itself with the interests of heavy industry owners. A rift over a structural reform of unemployment benefits led to a collapse of consensus between the coalition parties, resulting in the resignation of Müller's cabinet on 27 March 1930.

== Presidential cabinets ==
=== Brüning ===
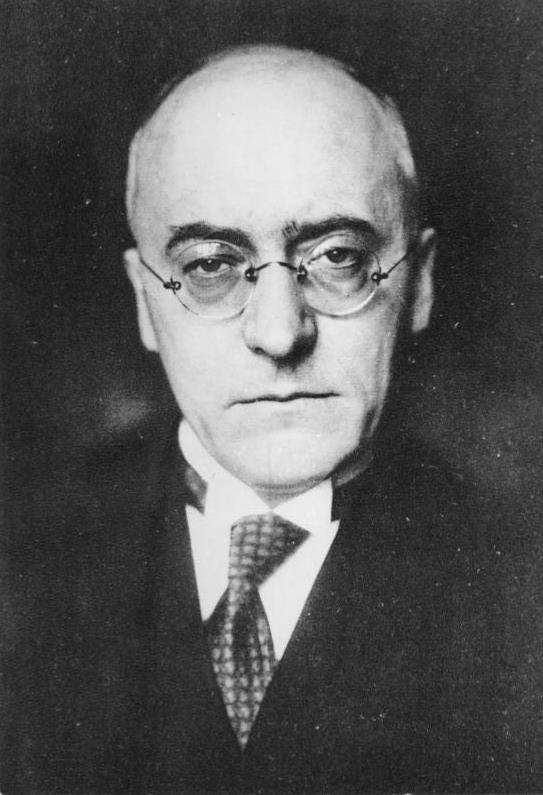
Heinrich Brüning, here pictured around 1930, led the first presidential cabinet from April 1930 to May 1932.

President Paul von Hindenburg, a retired general with links to anti-parliamentary and aristocratic circles, had long sought to replace the grand coalition with a conservative government that did not answer to parliament but to the president himself. Hindenburg's thinking was influenced by his conservative advisors who favoured an authoritarian style of government and by the increasingly deadlocked state of parliament. When Müller's cabinet resigned, Hindenburg appointed the Centre Party politician Heinrich Brüning to the office of chancellor. According to Otto Meissner, the president's chief of staff, Brüning's qualities were uniquely suited to the role: he belonged to the conservative wing of the Center Party and had fought in the First World War, making him acceptable to the far-right. His stance on social issues, on the other hand, made him palatable to the SPD.

The new chancellor's brief was to form a government of right-of-centre ministers and to exclude the SPD, the largest party of the Reichstag, from government. Although Brüning was to present his legislative programme to parliament, he had secured a guarantee that Hindenburg would back up his new chancellor by invoking article 48.

On 3 April 1930, supported by the votes of the nationalist German National People's Party (DNVP), Brüning's government unexpectedly survived an SPD-led motion of no confidence. In July 1930, Brüning intended to pass a bill that would enact harsh tax increases and reduce social spending in a bid to reduce state expenditure against the background of the Great Depression. When parliament rejected the bill, Hindenburg triggered article 48, dissolved the Reichstag, and signed the chancellor's spending plans into law using emergency powers. In the view of the historian Heinrich August Winkler, this step marked the transition from a 'concealed' form of presidential government to an overt one.

In September 1930, the election to replace the dissolved Reichstag returned a parliament without viable coalition options: the National Socialist German Workers' Party (NSDAP) led by Adolf Hitler had won the second most seats after the SPD. Since both the Communist Party of Germany, which had won a sizeable number of seats, and the NSDAP refused to co-operate with other political parties, it became impossible to find majorities for any legislative programme. Brüning attempted to convince the leadership of the NSDAP to work with his government but was turned down. The chancellor was able to survive the obstruction of these parties with the support of the SPD. Rattled by the rising influence of the far-right, the party adopted a 'policy of toleration' (Tolerierungspolitik) towards Brüning's cabinet: it vowed to oppose motions of no confidence and thereby enabled the chancellor to govern solely via article 48. In the following months, the legislative importance of the Reichstag rapidly deteriorated: while parliament had held 94 sessions in 1930, it only convened 13 times in 1932.

Tolerated by the SPD, Brüning continued his policy of fiscal austerity, facing growing opposition from business leaders and the extreme-right Harzburg Front. The 1932 presidential election returned Hindenburg to power but revealed substantial popular support for the NSDAP, whose candidate Hitler had gained 36.8% of the vote. This impression was reinforced through a series of state elections in the spring of 1932 in which the NSDAP performed well. The government sought to counter this trend by banning party-aligned paramilitary groups including the NSDAP's Sturmabteilung and Schutzstaffel. At this time, Hindenburg's advisors, chief among whom former general Kurt von Schleicher, developed plans to install a more authoritarian cabinet with the support of the NSDAP. Schleicher envisaged a form of government in which the Reichswehr, Germany's army, was to be the dominant force with Hitler and his party in a secondary role. Brüning's ban on paramilitary groups ran counter to such plans and precipitated a drive to remove him from office. On 29 May 1932, Hindenburg demanded the chancellor's resignation; the immediate cause for this was a disagreement over the settlement of farmers in the territories east of the river Elbe.

=== Papen ===
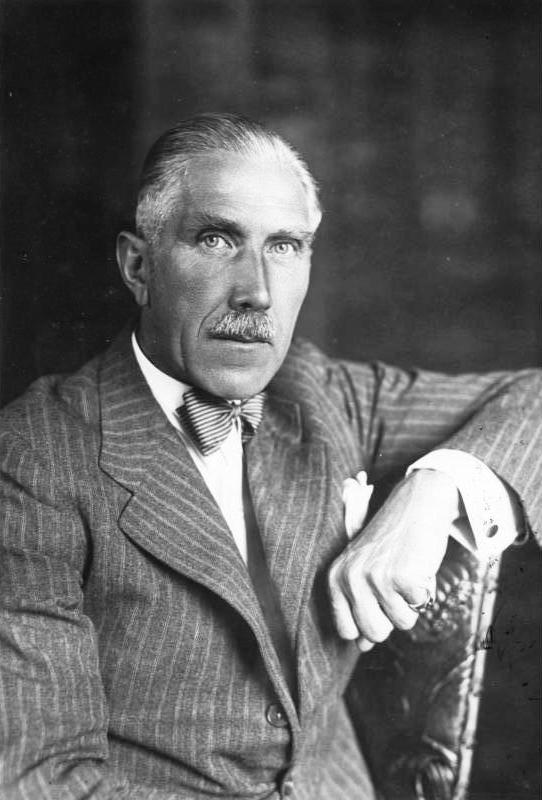
Franz von Papen, photographed in 1936 as German ambassador to Turkey

On 1 June 1932, Hindenburg appointed Franz von Papen to the office of chancellor. A former member of the Centre Party, Papen recruited his cabinet from the ranks of the nobility, leading the SPD-affiliated newspaper Vorwärts to describe it as Das Kabinett der Barone ('Cabinet of barons'). Since only the DNVP had agreed to tolerate his government, the chancellor derived his authority from Hindenburg's use of article 48. Soon after Papen's appointment, Hindenburg dissolved parliament and scheduled an election for 31 July. In the intervening period, the government repealed the ban on paramilitary groups and took over the government of Prussia, whose legislature had been in deadlock after a state election.

The July election returned a landslide victory for Hitler's NSDAP, which won 37.4% of the vote and became the largest party in the Reichstag. In the aftermath of the election, Schleicher offered Hitler an opportunity to enter into the current government. Hitler refused, demanding that he be made chancellor of a new presidential cabinet. Hindenburg brusquely rejected his demands in a meeting on 13 August. Papen remained in office but was defeated in a vote on its emergency powers tabled by the opposition on 12 September. That day a motion of no confidence on the issue of the President's decree was presented by Ernst Torgler. As voting began Papen rose and held out an undated dissolution decree to the Speaker Hermann Göring. Göring shouted to Papen that a vote was already taking place, drawing thunderous cheers. In response Papen dropped the decree on Göring's desk and left the Reichstag. The vote continued; the results were 513 votes of no confidence, 32 of confidence and 5 abstentions. Göring then declared the dissolution decree invalid on the basis of being presented by a government overthrown by the Reichstag. Papen argued that the decree was valid as it was on Göring's table before the vote concluded. Nevertheless, President von Hindenburg declared martial law and held new elections.

Even though the NSDAP regressed from its strong showing in the previous poll, the election of 6 November 1932 did not materially alter the parliamentary deadlock. Hitler again attempted to become chancellor of a presidential government. Hindenburg indicated that he would not approve Hitler's chancellorship unless he could assemble a majority in parliament, a path Hitler rejected categorically. The president realised that the current cabinet had too little support to prevent another defeat and a subsequent election. Papen proposed to sidestep this problem by indefinitely postponing an election and by suppressing opposition groups with force. Hindenburg, though not rigidly opposed to such plans, opted to dismiss Papen under Schleicher's influence.

=== Schleicher ===
On 3 December 1932, Schleicher was appointed chancellor and formed a cabinet of similar characteristics to that of his predecessor. He had won the approval of the president by his opposition to Papen's strongly authoritarian plans, as he doubted the ability of the Reichswehr to contain a popular uprising if it arose. Although Schleicher's government managed to stay in office during a brief session of parliament from 6 to 9 December, it became clear that a motion of no-confidence would eventually be tabled if the Reichstag were to reconvene the next month. Thus, Schleicher began contemplating a prolonged state of emergency without an elected parliament. Germany's military leadership expected far-reaching strikes and even the outbreak of civil war should this option be pursued. The chancellor avoided this outcome by reaching out to all political groups, including the NSDAP and trade unions. His efforts were undermined by the opposition of the agricultural and industrial lobbies who resented his willingness to compromise with organised labour.

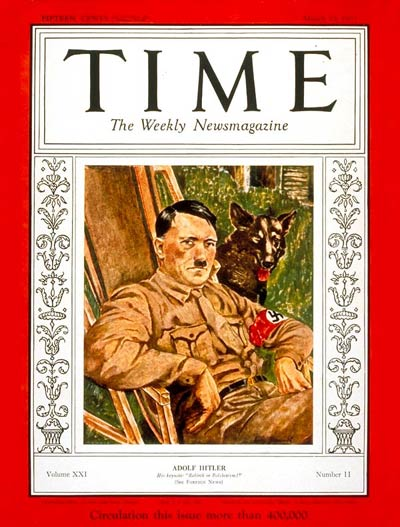
The appointment of Adolf Hitler, here pictured on a March 1933 cover of Time magazine, ended the era of presidential cabinets.

In January 1933, former chancellor Papen entered into negotiations with Hitler with the aim of replacing the government of Schleicher. Papen considered the possibility of collaborating with Hitler because he still harboured resentments against Schleicher and because he shared the view of leading industrialists that Hitler's popular support would aid the construction of a stable government. The pair met in Cologne on 4 January to discuss the possibility of a cabinet involving the DNVP and Hitler's own party under the leadership of both Papen and Hitler. In the following days, Papen intensely lobbied Hindenburg in favour of his plan, arguing that the conservative forces in a potential new government would keep Hitler's radicalism in check.

On 16 January, Schleicher requested that the president dissolve the Reichstag to bring about a prolonged state of emergency. Hindenburg declined and insisted that a solution with the current parliament be found. Schleicher handed in the resignation of his government on 28 January. Two days later, Hindenburg gave in to Papen's suggestions and appointed Hitler to the office of chancellor in the hope that he would be able to muster a majority in parliament. Like those of his predecessors, Hitler's government was initially only supported by the president's use of executive power. What set him from apart from previous presidential cabinets was his leadership of a political mass movement and its paramilitary organisations.

== Assessment ==
According to the historian Andreas Rödder, the presidential cabinets were the result of a wider scepticism towards parliamentary government that had taken hold in German society around 1930 after years of legislative impasse. He argues that the accrual of executive power in the hands of the president appeared as the most practical option when the political status quo had proved ineffective. For the historians Udo Wengst and Johannes Hürter, on the other hand, they mark a shift in political culture which emphasised the authority of the president. In their view, governance of the Weimar Republic acquired a perceptibly different quality centred on constitutional issues and dictated by Hindenburg whose commitment to democracy was limited.

Winkler writes that Hindenburg's use of Article 48 reappropriated the intent of the Weimar constitution. The article was designed for use in situations of utmost danger to the nation and was to be relinquished once these had passed. In his view, Hindenburg turned an emergency device into a substitute of the original constitution without intending to return to the constitutional norm. After the NSDAP had become the dominant party of German politics in the election of September 1930, parliament could no longer facilitate a path back to normal constitutional government since sustainable majorities could no longer be formed.

The president's decision to govern without the support of the Reichstag is regarded by historians as a milestone on Germany's progression from a multi-party democracy to a totalitarian dictatorship under Hitler: the abolition of parliamentary government removed moderate parties from power and eroded trust among the electorate, making the anti-democratic NSDAP a more palatable political choice. According to the historian and political scientist Karl Dietrich Bracher, the development of semi-constitutional forms of government was part of a broader European trend, while the historian Andreas Wirsching points to the 6 February 1934 crisis in France as a comparable but violent outcome of the erosion of trust in parliamentary government.

== Bibliography ==
- Dyzenhaus, David (1997). "Legal Theory in the Collapse of Weimar: Contemporary Lessons?" (PDF). The American Political Science Review. 91 (1): 121–134. doi:10.2307/2952263. ISSN 1537-5943. JSTOR 2952263.
- Kolb, Eberhard (2005). The Weimar Republic. London and New York: Routledge. ISBN 978-0-203-34166-7.
- Kolb, Eberhard (2013). Die Weimarer Republik (in German) (8th ed.). Munich: Oldenbourg Wissenschaftsverlag. doi:10.1524/9783486718775. ISBN 978-3-486-49796-0.
- Rödder, Andreas (1999). "Reflexionen über das Ende der Weimarer Republik. Die Präsidialkabinette 1930-1932/33. Krisenmanagement oder Restaurationsstrategie?". Vierteljahrshefte für Zeitgeschichte (in German). 47 (1): 87–101. ISSN 0042-5702. JSTOR 30195525.
- Schulz, Gerhard (1992). Ehrlich, Ernst L (ed.). Von Brüning zu Hitler: Der Wandel des politischen Systems in Deutschland 1930–1933 (in German). Berlin and Boston: De Gruyter. doi:10.1515/9783110848946. ISBN 978-3-11-013525-1.
- Vespignani, Enzo (1976). Faschismus (in German). Berlin: Elefanten Press. ISBN 978-3-88520-003-1.
- Winkler, Heinrich August (1993). Weimar 1918-1933. Die Geschichte der ersten deutschen Demokratie (in German). Munich: C.H. Beck. ISBN 978-3-406-44037-3.
