= Paul Moldenhauer =

German politician (1876–1947)

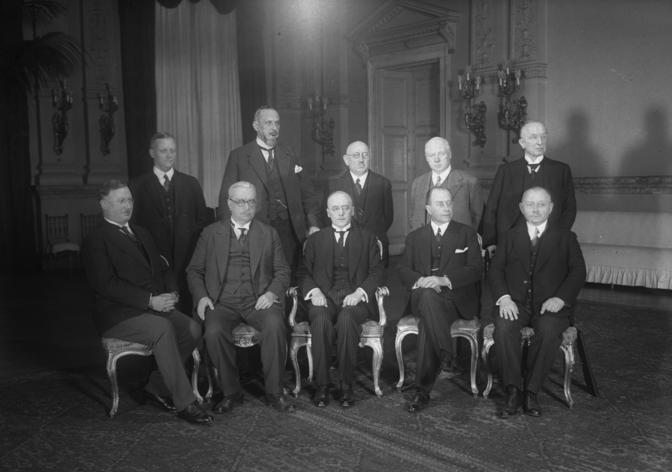
Germany's Cabinet Brüning I (1930): Finance Minister Paul Moldenhauer standing in the second row, second from the right

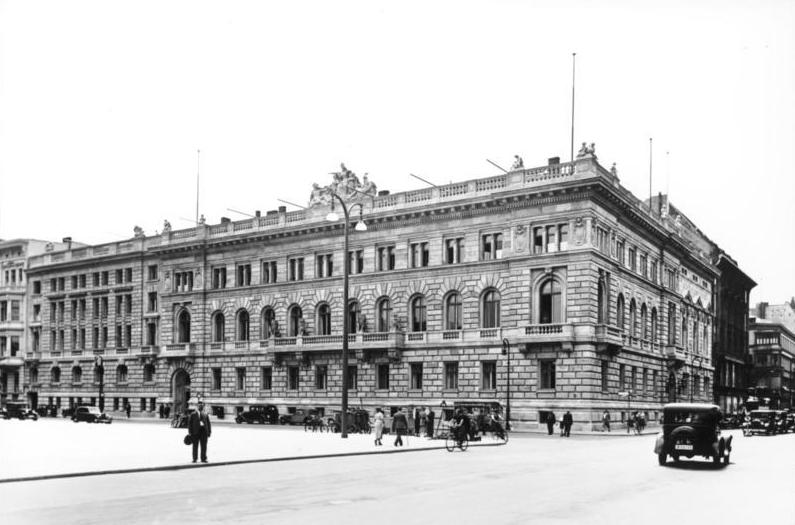
Ministry of Finance (Reichsministerium der Finanzen) at the Wilhelmplatz in Berlin (1930)

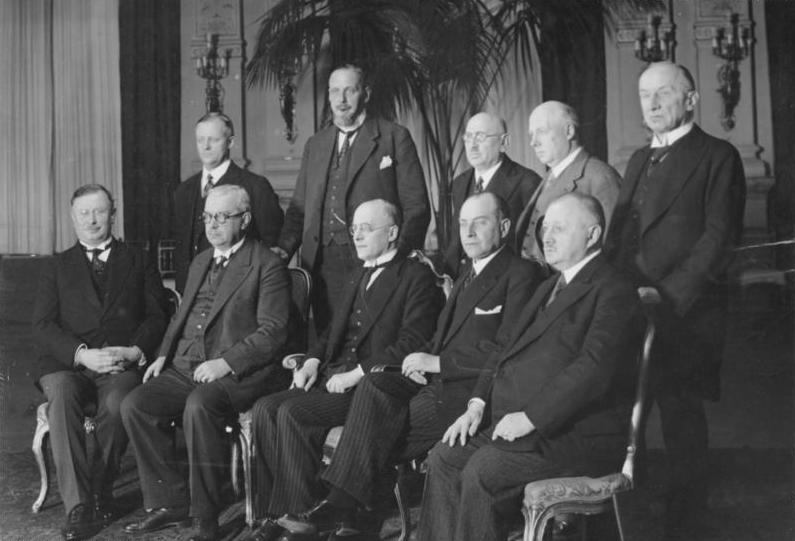
Germany’s Government under Brüning 31 March 1930: seated from left to right interior minister Joseph Wirth (Zentrum), minister of trade and industry Hermann Dietrich (DDP), chancellor Brüning, foreign minister Julius Curtius (DVP), postal minister Georg Schätzel (BVP), standing from left to right: minister for Elsass-Lothringen Gottfried Reinhold Treviranus (Konservative Volkspartei), minister for agriculture Martin Schiele (DNVP), minister for justice Johann Viktor Bredt (Wirtschaftspartei), labour minister Adam Stegerwald (Zentrum), minister of finance Paul Moldenhauer (DVP), traffic minister Theodor von Guérard (Zentrum). Defence minister Wilhelm Groener missing from picture

Paul Moldenhauer (2 December 1876 in Cologne – 1 February 1947) was a German cabinet minister, lawyer, economist and politician (DVP). He served as a German Reichstag member 1920-1932 and was German Minister of Finance and Minister of Trade and Industry in the late 1920s and early 1930s.

== Biography ==
Paul Moldenhauer was born in 1876 in Cologne. He studied jurisprudence and political science at the University of Bonn. In 1897 he commenced doctoral studies at the University of Göttingen where he was awarded his Ph.D. in 1899. He also obtained a degree in insurance studies, which at this time was a relatively new and growing subject area. Moldenhauer was thereafter active in the insurance industry until 1902 in Aachen and in Cologne. In 1901 he habilitated (became a Professor Doctor) in insurance studies at the University of Cologne, where he became a member of the faculty of economics. He was a member of the German Colonial Society.

After the Great War, Moldenhauer returned to the University of Cologne as a faculty member. He also became active in politics and engaged himself in the post-war socio-economical debate. He undertook several trips to the United States and to England, where he established good relations with academics at leading universities including Princeton, Harvard and Cambridge. Notably, he maintained a dialogue with John Maynard Keynes concerning stimulative fiscal policy.

Moldenhauer was elected in 1919 to the Prussian parliament in Berlin, and in 1920 to the parliament of the Weimar Republic. He remained a member of parliament until June 1930, when he resigned from his post as minister of finance together with several other cabinet ministers following disagreements within the government of Heinrich Brüning regarding the economic and financial policy.

Following his time as a cabinet member and minister of finance, Moldenhauer returned to academia as a professor at the University of Berlin, and later as a board member of companies including Friedrich Krupp AG, Gerling Versicherungs-AG, and Bayer AG.

Paul Moldenhauer was dedicated to stabilising Germany's economy and its relations with France, Great Britain and the United States, and was a leading delegate at the Disarmament Conferences in Den Haag 1930 and Geneva 1932.

== Finance Minister of Germany ==
On 11 November 1928, Moldenhauer was appointed cabinet member and Minister of Trade and Industry (Reichswirtschaftsminister) in Chancellor Hermann Müller’s government. Following a cabinet reshuffle he was subsequently appointed minister of finance (Reichsminister der Finanzen). Following Müller’s resignation as Chancellor, Moldenhauer stayed on as minister of finance also in the coalition government of Heinrich Brüning.

== German Delegate to Disarmament Conventions in Geneva and Den Haag ==
Paul Moldenhauer was dedicated to stabilising Germany's economy and its relations with France, Great Britain and the United States, and his policies under the Müller government were orientated toward reconciliation and normalisation. Together with Müller, Stresemann and von Schubert, and subsequently Brüning, Curtius and von Bülow, Finance Minister Moldenhauer was a leading delegate at the Disarmament Conferences in Geneva and Den Haag.

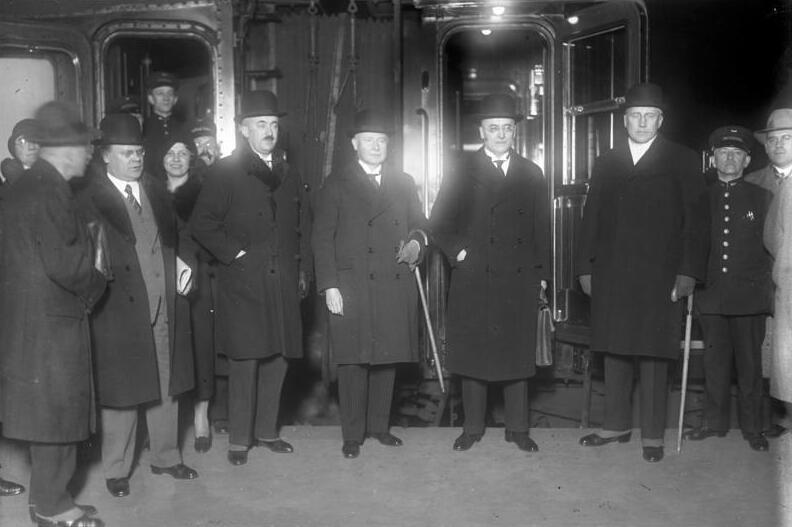
The German delegation to the Disarmament Conference in Geneva 1932

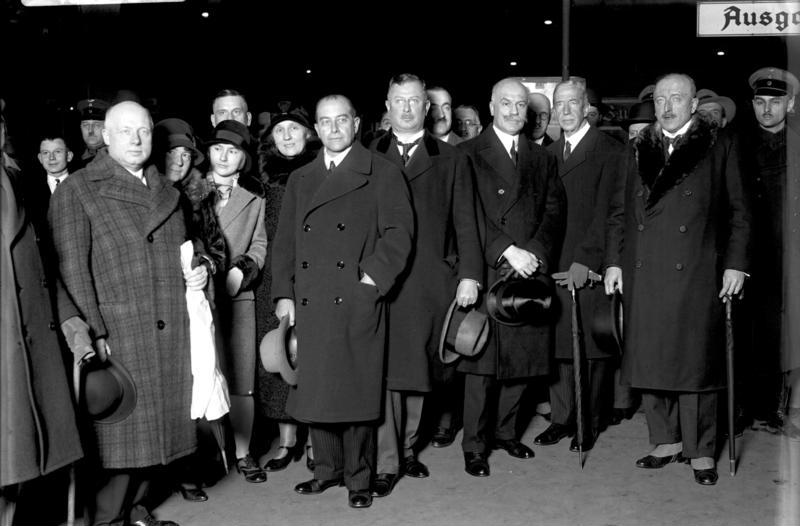
The German delegation to the Disarmament Conference in Den Haag 1930

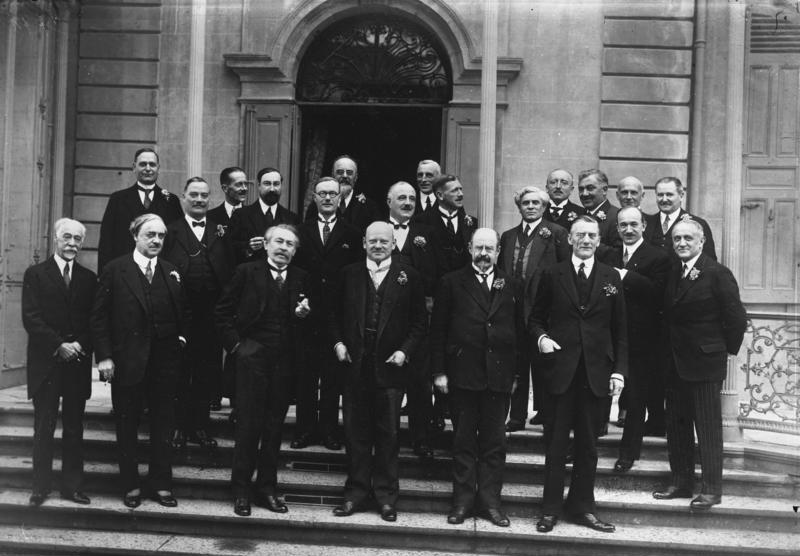
Germany accepted into the League of Nations in Geneva 1926

== Works ==
- Das Versicherungswesen, 1905/12, I, 1925, II, 1923
- Die Aufsicht über die privaten Versicherungsunternehmungen, 1903
- Die industriellen und landwirtschaftlichen Haftpflichtversicherungsverbände, 1907
- Internationale Fortschritte der Sozialversicherung, 1912
- Von der Revolution zur Nationalversammlung, Die Frage der rheinisch-westfälischen Republik, 1919
- Die rheinische Republik, 1920
- Grenzgebiete zwischen Feuer- und Transportversicherung, 1921
- Das Londoner Abkommen und die deutsche Volkswirtschaft, 1924
- Der künftige Kurs der deutschen Sozialpolitik, 1926
- Internationale Sozialpolitik, 1927
