= Theodor von Guérard =

German jurist and politician (1863–1943)

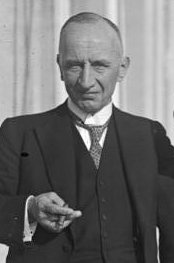
- von Guérard in 1928

Reich Minister of Transport
- In office 30 March 1930 – 10 October 1931
- Chancellor: Heinrich Brüning
- Preceded by: Adam Stegerwald
- Succeeded by: Gottfried Treviranus
- In office 27 June 1928 – 6 February 1929
- Chancellor: Hermann Müller
- Preceded by: Wilhelm Koch
- Succeeded by: Georg Schätzel (acting)

Reich Minister of Justice
- In office 13 April 1929 – 27 March 1930
- Chancellor: Hermann Müller
- Preceded by: Erich Koch-Weser
- Succeeded by: Johann Viktor Bredt

Reich Minister for the Occupied Territories
- Acting; 28 June 1928 – 6 February 1929
- Chancellor: Hermann Müller
- Preceded by: Wilhelm Marx (acting)
- Succeeded by: Carl Severing (acting)

Member of the Reichstag
- In office 24 June 1920 – 18 July 1930
- Constituency: Koblenz–Trier

Personal details
- Born: 29 December 1863 Koblenz, Rhine Province, Kingdom of Prussia
- Died: 21 July 1943 (aged 79) Ahaus, Province of Westphalia, Nazi Germany
- Political party: Centre Party
- Education: University of Freiburg; University of Bonn; Humboldt University of Berlin

Karl Theodor von Guérard (29 December 1863 – 21 July 1943) was a German jurist and politician of the Catholic Centre Party (German: Zentrum). He served as Minister of Justice and Minister of Transport of the Weimar Republic in the late 1920s and early 1930s.

== Early life ==
von Guérard was born on 29 December 1863 at Koblenz, as the son of Bernhard von Guérard (1825–1882), Obergerichtsprokurator and his wife Eleonore (1829–1905) née Kehrmann. The family of his father had emigrated from Lorraine in the 18th century, thus the French name.

He studied jurisprudence and political sciences and then joined the Prussian civil service. From 1898 to 1905 he was Landrat at Mondschau, and then worked at the Oberpräsidium Koblenz, the administrative center of the Prussian Rhine Province.

He married Hedwig Mooren (1871–1950) at Düsseldorf in 1891. They had two sons and two daughters.

== Political career ==
He was a member of the Reichstag from 1920 to 1930 for the Zentrum. Initially considered part of the conservative wing of the party, he was active on subjects such as the occupied territories as well as judicial and transport issues. Following the 1924 elections, he argued in favour of a coalition with the right-wing German National People's Party (DNVP). However, when he took up the position of executive vice-chair of his party's Reichstag group in May 1926, he became more left-wing oriented.

In December 1927, he became chairman of the Zentrum group and in this function helped bring about the demise of the third government of Wilhelm Marx. He then became Minister of Transport and Minister for the Occupied Territories in the second cabinet of Hermann Müller in 1928. During a reshuffle he became Minister of Justice. Although he was considered an opponent of Heinrich Brüning, Theodor von Guérard was again appointed Minister of Transport in 1930 under Brüning's chancellorship. On the behest of president Paul von Hindenburg, Theodor von Guérard left the government in autumn of 1931.

This ended his political career. He died in Ahaus (Westphalia) on 21 July 1943.

== Works ==
- Die große Steuerreform des Jahres 1922, Schriftenreihe zur deutschen Politik, H. 4, 1922 (with H. Lange-Hegermann and P. Schulz-Gahmen)
- Das besetzte Gebiet, in: Politisches Jahrbuch, ed. by G. Schreiber, 1925, 1926, 1927/28 (the last with Herm. Hofmann), 1926–28.
