= Julius Curtius =

German politician (1877–1948)

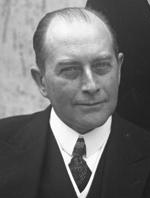
- Curtius in 1930

Reich Minister for Foreign Affairs
- In office 8 November 1929 – 3 October 1931
- Chancellor: Hermann Müller; Heinrich Brüning
- Preceded by: Gustav Stresemann
- Succeeded by: Heinrich Brüning

Reich Minister of Economics
- In office 19 January 1926 – 11 November 1929
- Chancellor: Hans Luther; Wilhelm Marx; Hermann Müller
- Preceded by: Rudolf Krohne
- Succeeded by: Paul Moldenhauer

Member of the Reichstag
- In office 24 June 1920 – 4 June 1932
- Constituency: Baden

Personal details
- Born: 7 February 1877 Duisburg, Kingdom of Prussia, German Empire
- Died: 10 November 1948 (aged 71) Heidelberg, West Germany
- Party: German People's Party (DVP)
- Spouse: Adda Carp
- Children: 5
- Profession: Lawyer, politician

Julius Curtius (7 February 1877 – 10 November 1948) was a German politician who served as Minister for Economic Affairs (from January 1926 to December 1929) and Foreign Minister of the Weimar Republic (from October/November 1929 to October 1931).

== Early life ==
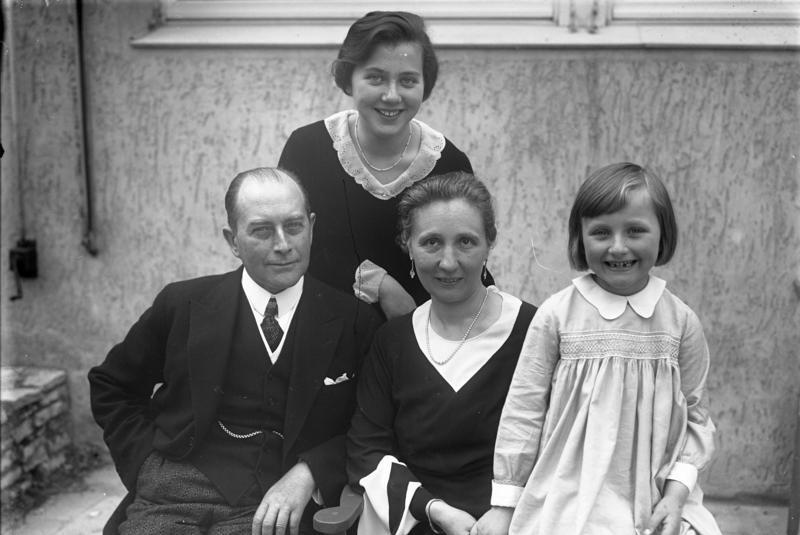
Julius Curtius with his wife and two daughters, 1930

Julius Curtius was born on 7 February 1877 at Duisburg in what was then the Prussian Rhine Province.

His father Friedrich (1850-1904) owned an ultramarine works at Duisburg and an alum works at Eichelkamp. Friedrich's brother was Theodor Curtius, a professor of chemistry. Julius' mother was Adele (1824–98, née Brockhoff).

Julius married Adda Carp (1883-1967), sister of industrialist Werner Carp, in 1905. They had two sons and three daughters.

Curtius studied law at Kiel, Strasbourg and Bonn and was awarded a doctorate at Berlin. In 1905, he started practicing law at Duisburg. After 1911, he began working on issues in the field of public policy (Staatswissenschaften) at Heidelberg. He served in the First World War, finishing at the rank of Hauptmann (captain) of the Landwehr and Batterieführer and was awarded both Iron Crosses. He remained at Heidelberg where he also was a member of the city council (Stadtverordneter) until 1921. He then worked as a lawyer at the Kammergericht Berlin. He mainly represented (also as a member of supervisory boards) firms in the steel and coal, potash and railway rolling stock businesses. From 1920 to 1932, he was a member of the Reichstag for the German People's Party (DVP).

== Minister ==
Curtius became Reichswirtschaftsminister (Minister for Economic Affairs) in January 1926 as a member of the second cabinet of Hans Luther and remained in that office in several different cabinets that followed. After Gustav Stresemann died on 3 October 1929, Curtius became the acting Foreign Minister and in November vacated his old position and took over the Auswärtiges Amt.

As a minister he supported job-creation schemes and a close cooperation with the Soviet Union, especially in economic affairs. His main achievement was - as collaborator and "heir" of Stresemann - progress in the question of wartime reparations and the return of the occupied Rhineland. As the minister responsible for the Young Plan, Curtius was heavily criticized by DNVP, Der Stahlhelm, Nazis and the Pan-German League, who labelled him a "traitor to the fatherland".

Curtius unsuccessfully worked with Austria's Johann Schober in March 1931 to set up a German-Austrian custom union. However, France blocked this by putting economic pressure on Austria and by bringing about a decision by the Permanent Court of International Justice at The Hague, which voted 8:7 to rule the union in contradiction of the Geneva protocol of 1922 (see Anschlussverbot). This caused Curtius to resign on 3 October 1931.

To prevent the union being established, the French had withdrawn a number of short loans they had made to Austria; the withdrawal of the French loans helped to cause the collapse of Creditanstalt, Austria's largest bank, in May 1931, which in its turn brought about a series of banking collapses all over Central Europe in the summer of 1931.

Curtius was intimately involved in the negotiations that led to the issuing of the Hoover Moratorium by the U.S President Herbert Hoover that halted war reparations payments by Germany in June 1931 as part of the effort to limit the financial fall-out of the banking collapse.

== Later life and death ==
Following his resignation, Curtius left politics and worked as a lawyer, asset manager and farmer. After his house in Berlin was destroyed in World War II and his estate in Mecklenburg was seized by the Communist authorities he moved to Heidelberg in July 1946. Curtius died at Heidelberg on 10 November 1948.

== Works ==
- Über die Einführung von Volksinitiative und Volksreferendum in der neuen Verfassungen der deutschen Staaten, 1919
- Bismarcks Plan eines deutschen Volkswirtschaftsrats, 1919
- Was im Haag erreicht wurde, 1929
- Innere Konsolidierung und außenpolitische Aktionsfähigkeit, 1930
- Zur nationalen Freiheit, in: Um Deutschlands Zukunft, 1931, p. 17-38
- Germany and the Polish Corridor, 1933
- Bemühung um Österreich, Das Scheitern des Zollunionsplans von 1931, 1947
- Sechs Jahre Minister der deutschen Republik, 1948
- Der Young-Plan, Entstellung und Wahrheit, 1950

Political offices
Preceded by Gustav Stresemann	Foreign Minister of Germany; 1929 – 1931	Succeeded by Heinrich Brüning
