= Second Marx cabinet =

1924–25 cabinet of Weimar Germany

Second Cabinet of Wilhelm Marx
- 11th Cabinet of Weimar Germany
- 3 June 1924 – 15 December 1924 (until 15 January 1925 as caretaker government)
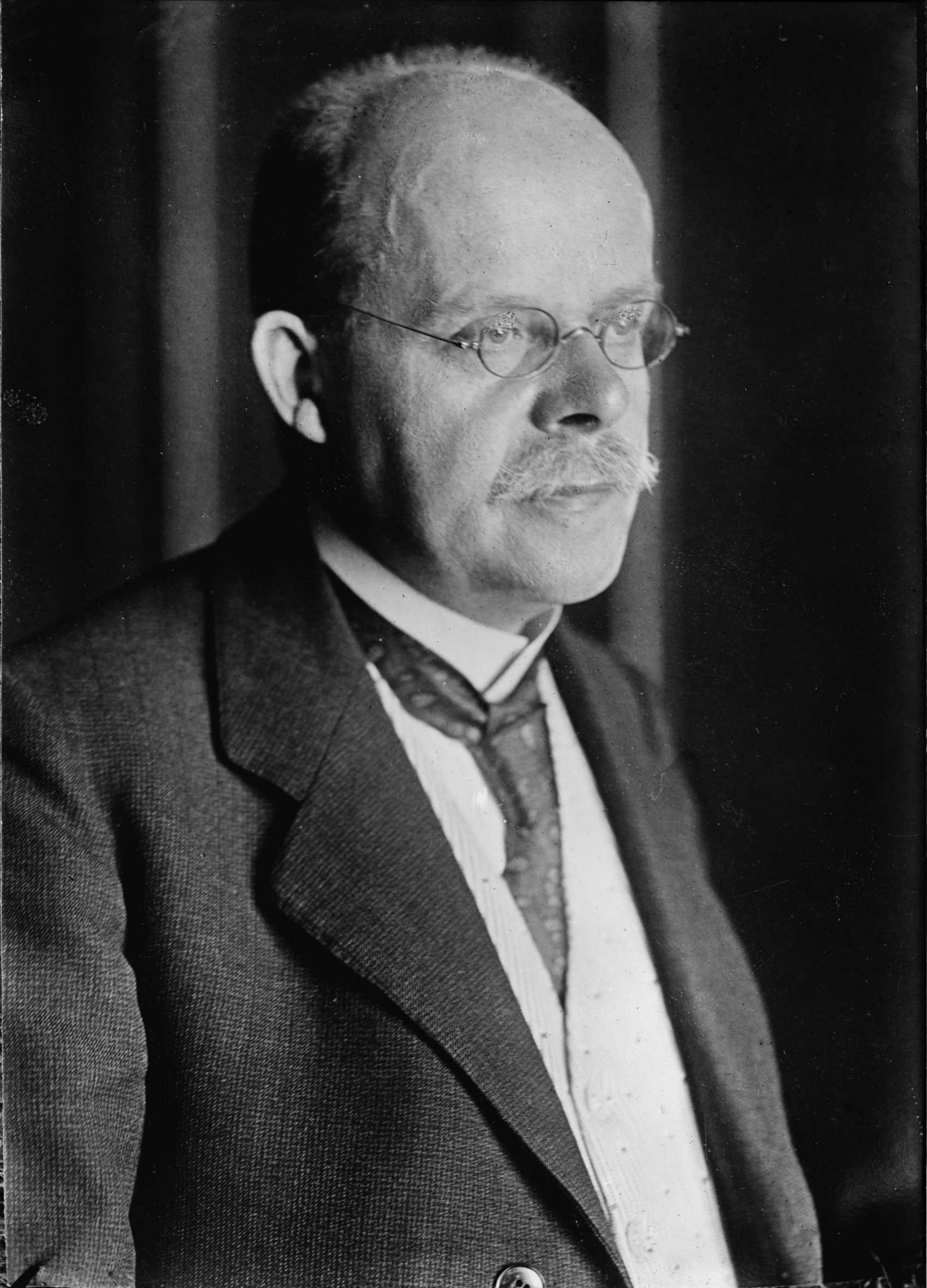
- Chancellor Wilhelm Marx
- Date formed: 3 June 1924
- Date dissolved: 15 January 1925 (7 months and 12 days)

People and organisations
- President: Friedrich Ebert
- Chancellor: Wilhelm Marx
- Vice Chancellor: Karl Jarres
- Member parties: Centre Party; German People's Party; German Democratic Party
- Status in legislature: Minority coalition government
- Opposition parties: German National People's Party; Communist Party; National Socialist Freedom Movement

History
- Election: May 1924 federal election
- Legislature term: 2nd Reichstag of the Weimar Republic
- Predecessor: First Marx cabinet
- Successor: First Luther cabinet

The second Marx cabinet, headed by Wilhelm Marx of the Centre Party, was the 11th democratically elected government during the Weimar Republic. It took office on 3 June 1924 when it replaced the first Marx cabinet, which had resigned on 26 May following the unfavourable results of the May 1924 Reichstag election. The new cabinet, made up of the Centre Party, German People's Party (DVP) and German Democratic Party (DDP), was unchanged from the previous one. The three coalition parties ranged politically from centre-left to centre-right.

During the cabinet's tenure, the Reichstag voted in favour of the Dawes Plan, which resolved important issues regarding the reparations payments that the Treaty of Versailles required Germany to make to the Allied victors of World War I.

Due to the failure of Marx's attempts to expand the cabinet's minority coalition to the right, new elections were held in December 1924. The results provided little help to Marx in his attempt to form a more stable coalition, with the result that his second cabinet resigned on 15 December 1924. It remained in office as a caretaker government until it was replaced on 15 January 1925 by the cabinet of the independent Hans Luther.

== Establishment ==
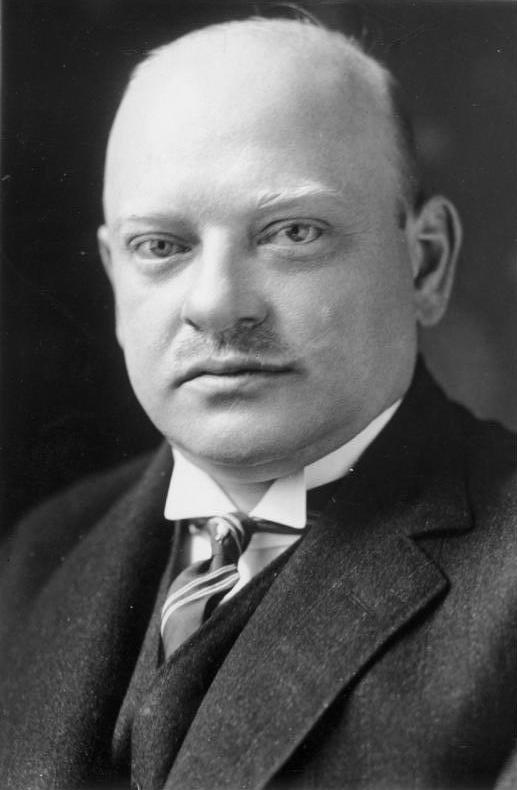
Gustav Stresemann (DVP), Foreign Minister

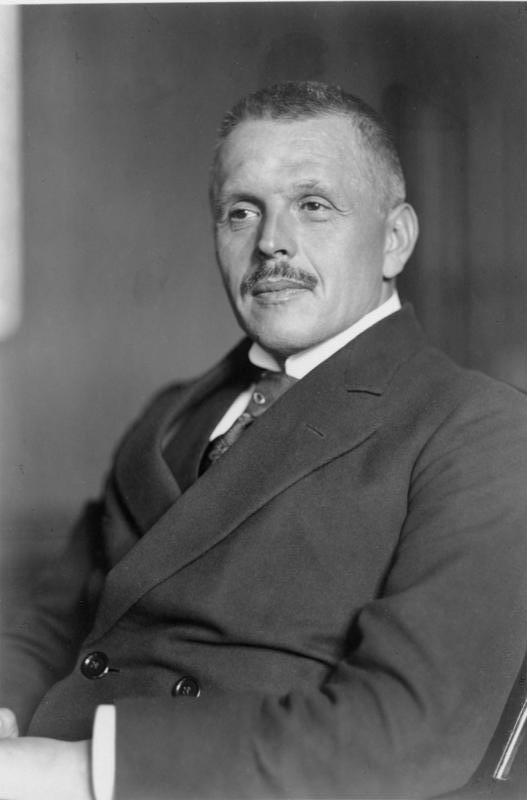
Otto Gessler (DDP), Reichswehr Minister

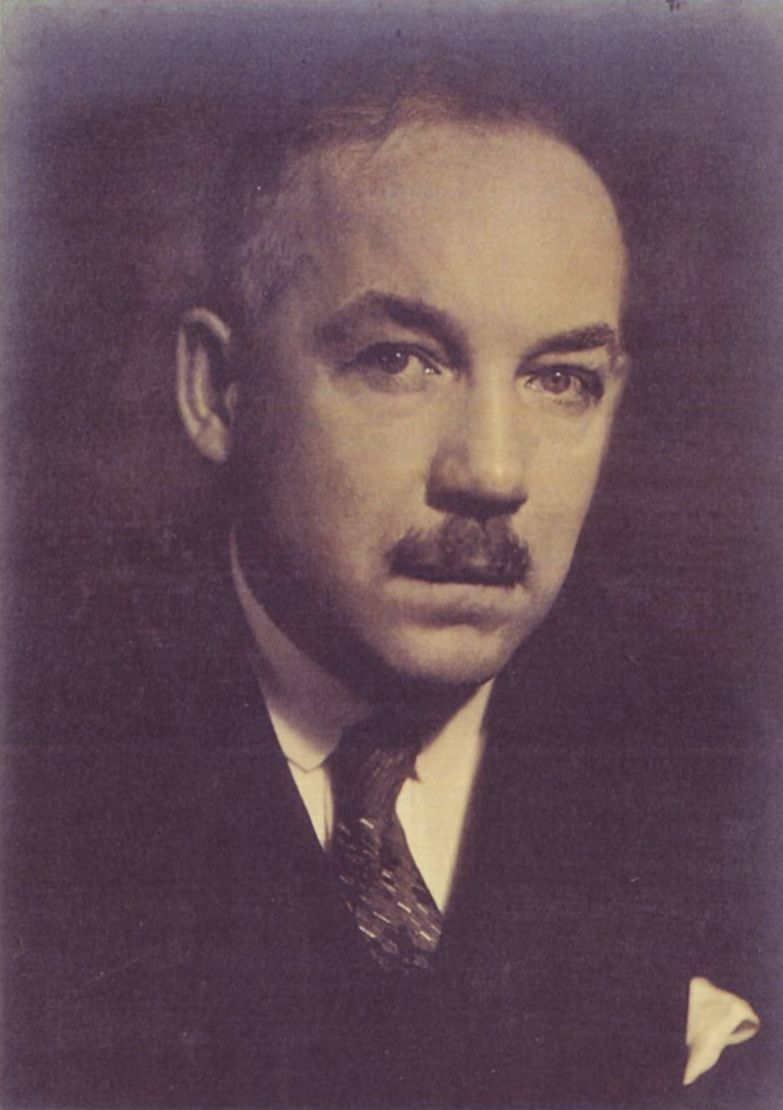
Eduard Hamm (DDP), Minister of Economic Affairs

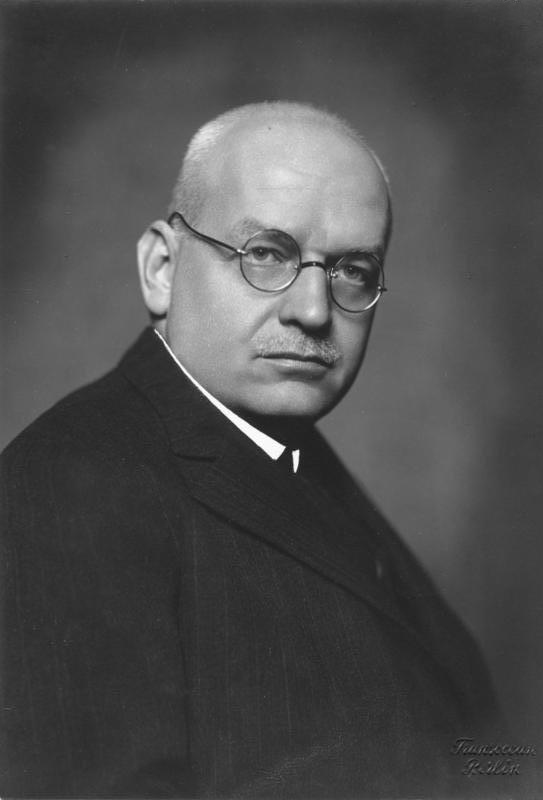
Hans Luther (Ind.), Minister of Finance

Following the lapse on 15 February 1924 of the enabling act that had allowed the emergency decrees on which many of the actions of the first Marx cabinet were based, there was no prospect of the Reichstag granting an extension. After the introduction of several draft laws that were aimed at undoing some of the government's decrees, notably on taxes, working hours and cuts to the public workforce, Marx called for new elections in May in order to prevent the Reichstag from undoing what he saw as vital policies.

The election results, which weakened the parties of the political centre and strengthened the extremes of the spectrum, were unfavourable for Marx. Because the need to approve and implement the Dawes Plan, which had been presented in April, would require a government able to act decisively, Marx's first cabinet stayed on until the new Reichstag assembled. After the German People's Party (DVP) forced the cabinet's resignation on 26 May – and faced with unacceptable demands from the newly strengthened German National People's Party (DNVP) – all of the existing ministers were simply reconfirmed in their posts as the second Marx cabinet on 3 June.

== Members ==
The members of the cabinet were as follows:

Portfolio	Minister	Took office	Left office	Party
Chancellorship	Wilhelm Marx	3 June 1924	15 January 1925	Centre
Vice-Chancellorship	Karl Jarres	3 June 1924	15 January 1925	DVP
Foreign Affairs	Gustav Stresemann	3 June 1924	15 January 1925	DVP
Interior	Karl Jarres	3 June 1924	15 January 1925	DVP
Justice	Curt Joël (acting)	3 June 1924	15 January 1925	Independent
Labour	Heinrich Brauns	3 June 1924	15 January 1925	Centre
Reichswehr	Otto Gessler	3 June 1924	15 January 1925	DDP
Economic Affairs	Eduard Hamm	3 June 1924	15 January 1925	DDP
Finance	Hans Luther	3 June 1924	15 January 1925	Independent
Food and Agriculture	Gerhard von Kanitz	3 June 1924	15 January 1925	Independent
Transport	Rudolf Oeser	3 June 1924	11 October 1924	DDP
Transport	Rudolf Krohne (acting)	12 October 1924	15 January 1925	DVP
Postal Affairs	Anton Höfle	3 June 1924	15 January 1925	Centre
Occupied Territories	Anton Höfle (acting)	3 June 1924	15 January 1925	Centre

== In office ==
The most important issue that the cabinet faced was the vote on the Dawes Plan. It had been drafted by a committee of experts from the victorious powers of World War I in an attempt to resolve major questions surrounding Germany's payment of reparations. The report emphasised that Germany must have a stable currency and a balanced budget, but did not set a total reparations amount. Germany was to pay one billion gold marks in the first year, with the amount rising to 2.5 billion marks per year in 1928. The Reichsbank, Germany's central bank, and its national railway were placed under international control to secure payments. The Plan also provided for the withdrawal of French and Belgian troops from the occupied Ruhr.

In spite of the fact that the political right objected to the Dawes Plan because of its limits on German sovereignty, the Reichstag voted 314 to 117 on 29 August to accept it. The supporters included half of the DNVP party membership, which led to suspicions that they had exchanged their yes votes for promises of cabinet posts. The Plan was formally signed by Germany and the Allied nations the next day.

== Resignation ==
The parties on which the coalition was based had only 138 out of 472 seats in the Reichstag, although the Social Democratic Party (SPD), with its 100 seats, for the most part supported the government's foreign policy. The DVP was interested in getting parliamentary support for key decisions from the DNVP and adding them to the coalition. One reason was that the DVP viewed the DNVP as its main rival for the public vote and wanted to include them in the government in order to force them to accept responsibility for the government's policies. Marx asked the DNVP to settle for three seats in the cabinet rather than the four they wanted, and requested that the DDP allow Otto Gessler to stay on as Reichswehr minister even if the DDP did not formally take part in the government. In negotiations in October 1924, however, the DDP refused to accept government participation by the DNVP. Marx's attempts to get the DDP to agree to tolerate a cabinet based on the Centre Party, DVP and DNVP also failed. He then asked President Ebert to dissolve the Reichstag (elected not even six months previously), which he did on 20 October.

The economic situation improved considerably in 1924, which was a key factor in the shift of votes from extreme to centrist parties in the election of 7 December. The Communist and Nazi Parties lost votes, whilst both Social Democrats and DNVP posted gains. That made it an open question whether the new government should include the former or the latter. Arithmetically, both an SPD/Centre/DDP/DVP or a Centre/DDP/DVP/DNVP coalition would have been able to rely on a Reichstag majority. When the DVP rejected governing with the SPD, Marx announced the cabinet's resignation on 15 December, although it stayed in office as a caretaker government. Negotiations on a new cabinet proved as difficult as they had been prior to the elections. They were broken off, and a resumption was postponed until early January 1925.

In the talks, none of the parties moved from their earlier positions. A government based on a parliamentary majority thus proved elusive. Once again, the idea of a "government of personages" was considered, i.e., of individuals not representing parties. Marx offered two DNVP seats in a new "non-partisan" cabinet, but both DVP and DNVP rejected the suggestion. A final attempt by Marx to retain a cabinet based just on the Centre and DDP failed, and on 9 January, he informed Ebert that he was unable to form a new government. On 15 January, the independent Hans Luther succeeded in putting together a cabinet of technocrats and "trusted men" based on a loose combination of parties from the Centre Party to the DNVP. The first Luther cabinet replaced Marx's government the same day.
