= Second Stresemann cabinet =

1923 cabinet of Weimar Germany

Second Cabinet of Gustav Stresemann
- 9th Cabinet of Weimar Germany
- 6 October 1923 – 23 November 1923 (until 30 November 1923 as caretaker government)
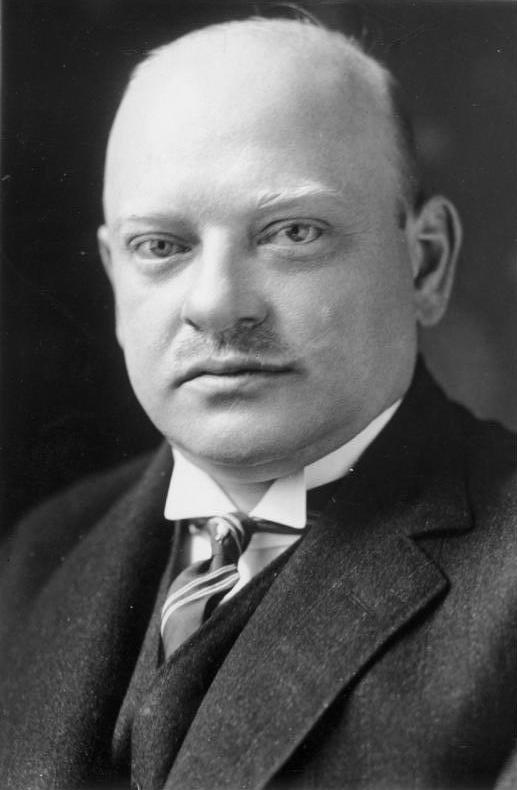
- Chancellor Gustav Stresemann
- Date formed: 6 October 1923
- Date dissolved: 30 November 1923 (1 month and 24 days)

People and organisations
- President: Friedrich Ebert
- Chancellor: Gustav Stresemann
- Member parties: German People's Party; Social Democratic Party (Note: Withdrew from the coalition effective 3 November); Centre Party; German Democratic Party
- Status in legislature: Majority coalition government (Note: Until the Social Democrats withdrew from the coalition effective 3 November); Minority coalition government (Note: From 3 November)
- Opposition parties: Communist Party of Germany; Social Democratic Party (Note: After withdrawing from the coalition effective 3 November)

History
- Election: 1920 federal election
- Legislature term: 1st Reichstag of the Weimar Republic
- Predecessor: First Stresemann cabinet
- Successor: First Marx cabinet

The second Stresemann cabinet, headed by Chancellor Gustav Stresemann of the German People's Party (DVP), was the ninth democratically elected government of the Weimar Republic. It took office on 6 October 1923 when it replaced the first Stresemann cabinet, which had resigned on 3 October over internal disagreements related to increasing working hours in vital industries above the eight-hour per day norm. The new cabinet was a majority coalition of four parties from the moderate left to the centre-right.

During its brief time in office, the cabinet successfully introduced the new currency that ended the disastrous period of hyperinflation. It was confronted with the resumption of war reparations payments following the end of passive resistance to the occupation of the Ruhr and faced down potentially separatist state governments in Saxony, Thuringia and Bavaria.

Stresemann's second cabinet resigned on 23 November 1923 after the Social Democrats (SPD) withdrew from the coalition over the government's handling of the separatist movements. After losing a confidence vote in the Reichstag, the cabinet resigned and, after a short caretaker period, was replaced on 30 November by the first cabinet of Wilhelm Marx of the Centre Party.

== Establishment ==
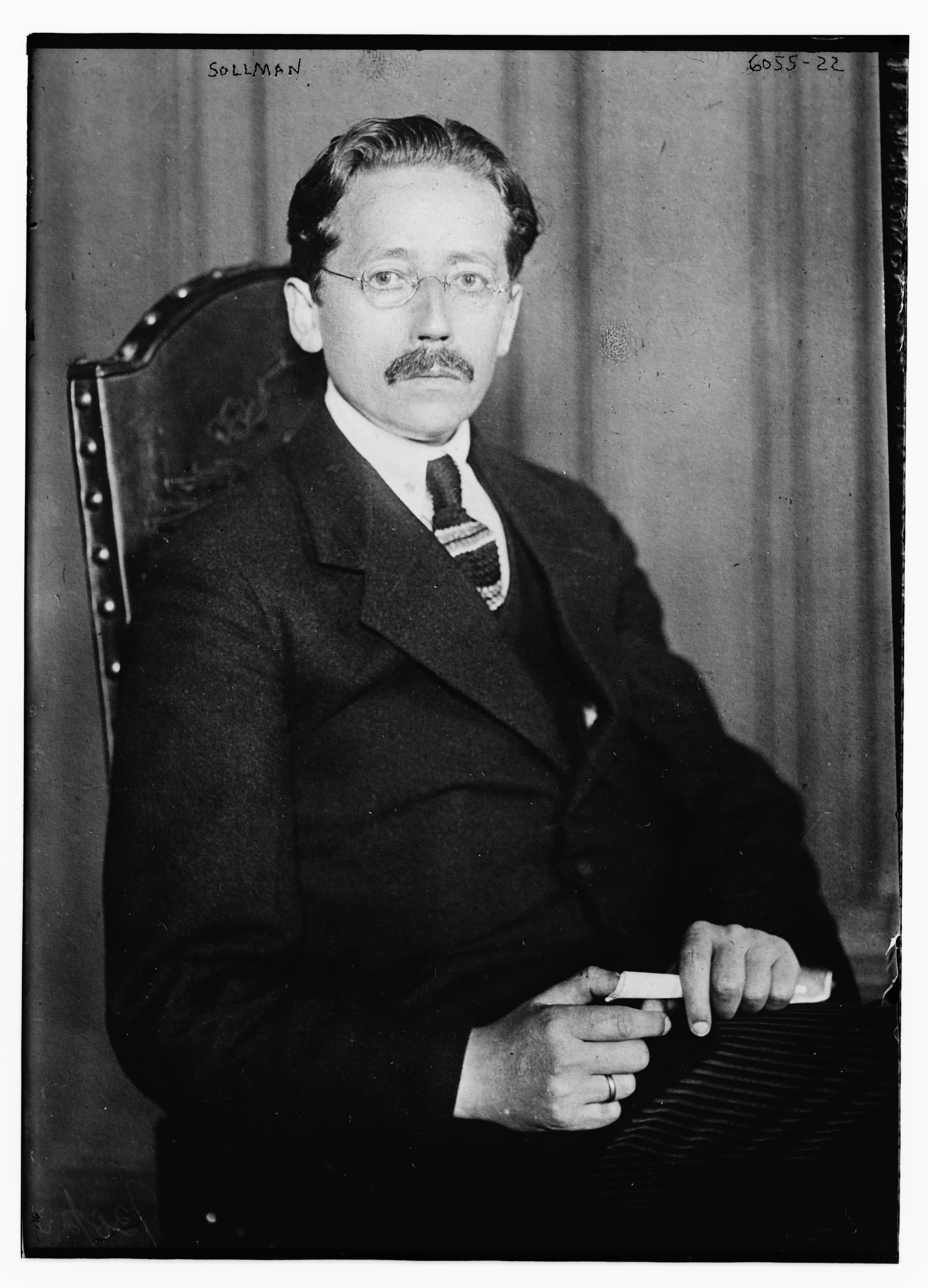
Wilhelm Sollmann (SPD), Minister of the Interior

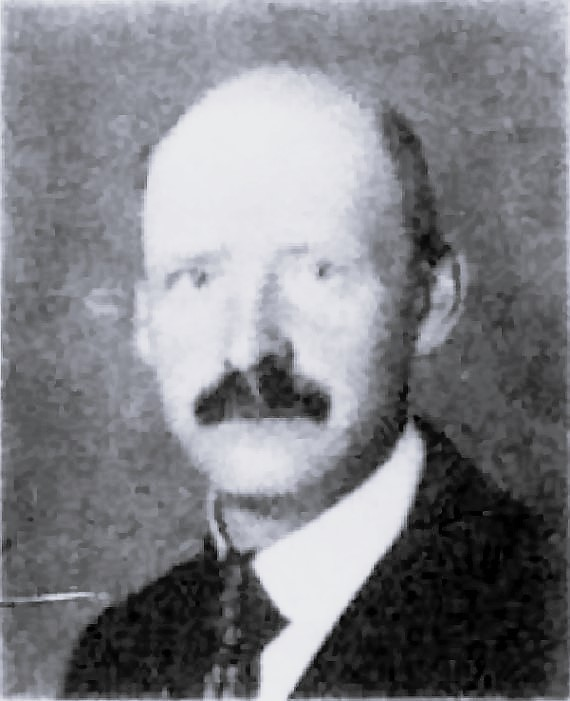
Gustav Radbruch (SPD), Minister of Justice

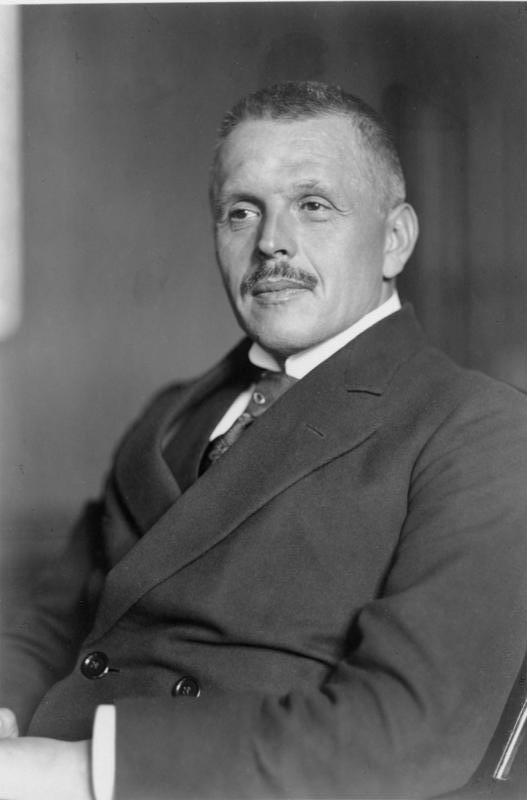
Otto Gessler (DDP), Reichswehrminister

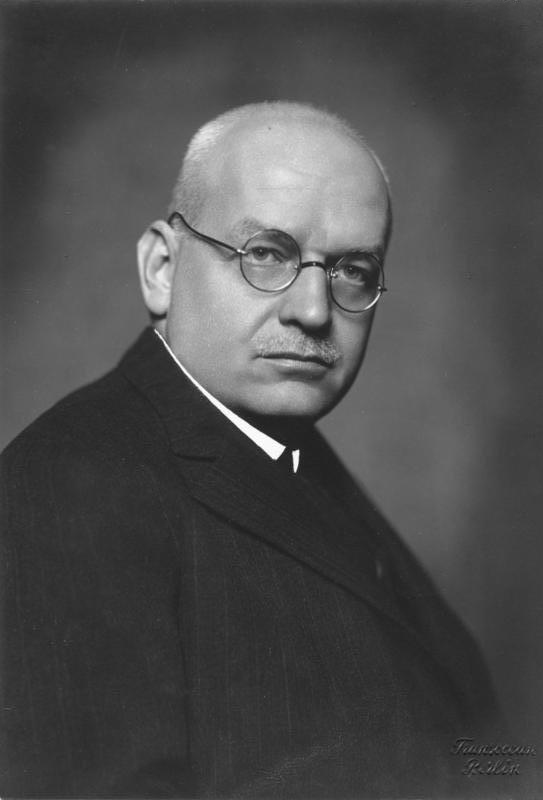
Hans Luther (Ind.), Minister of Finance

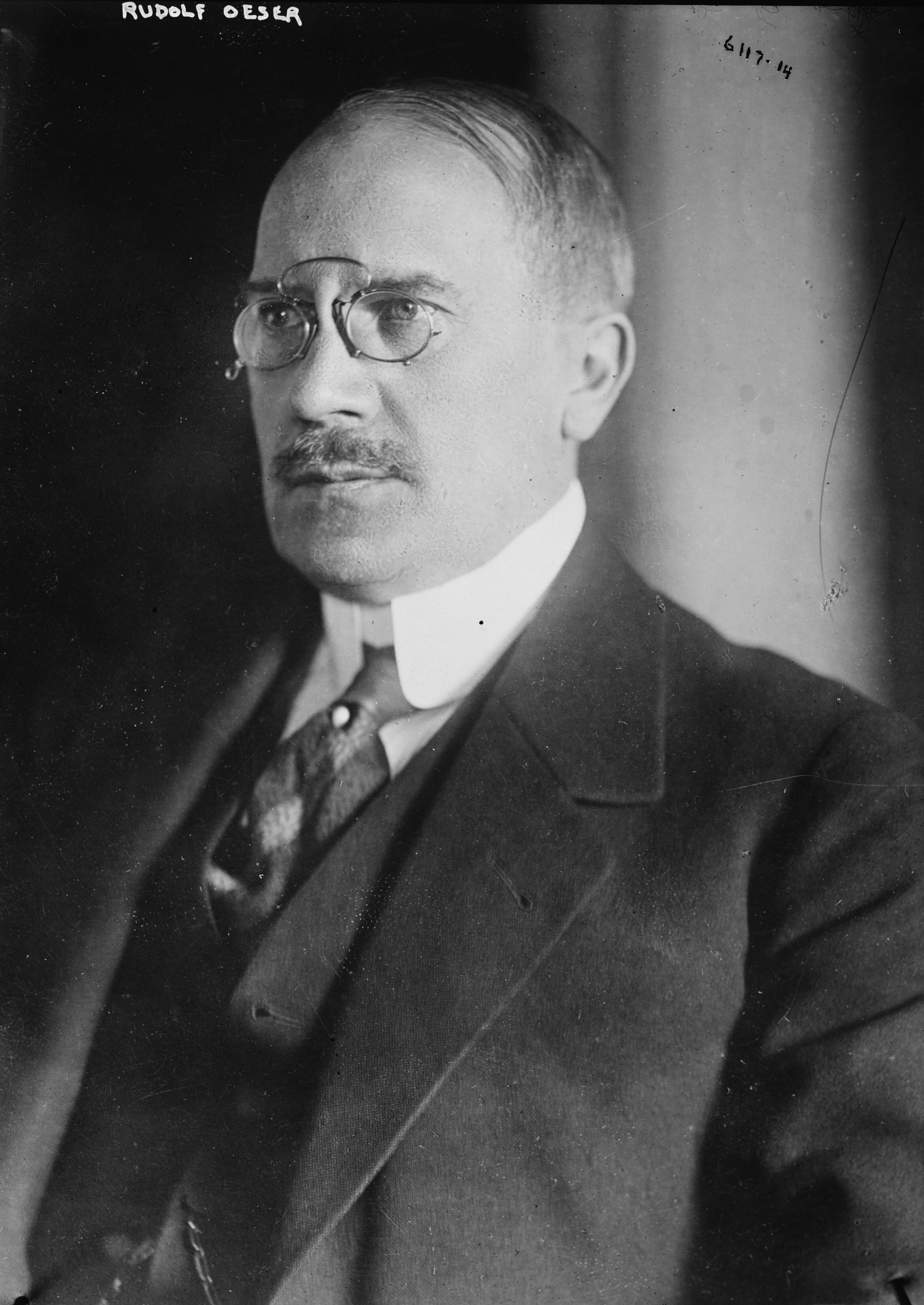
Rudolf Oeser (DDP), Minister of Transport

The first Stresemann cabinet resigned late on 3 October 1923 due to disagreement between the political parties over the extent to which the planned enabling act should give the government the power to change the length of the working day by decree. The grand coalition of the German People's Party (DVP), Social Democrats (SPD), Centre Party and German Democratic Party (DDP) was not replaced by a new configuration that included the right-wing German National People's Party (DNVP), which would have been consistent with the earlier decisions taken by the DVP Reichstag members. Since the majority of the DVP wanted to keep Stresemann in office and it proved impossible to form a different coalition under him, the original parties once again tried to form a government. Hans von Raumer (DVP) and Rudolf Hilferding (SPD) did not return, as demanded by the DVP. Raumer had resigned on 2 October, prior to the whole cabinet's resignation the next day. To replace Hilferding at the Ministry of Finance, Stresemann considered the future Reichsbank president Hjalmar Schacht but had to drop the idea after Schacht's actions during the occupation of Belgium during World War I became the subject of criticism. Hans Luther was then switched from Food and Agriculture to Finance. Von Raumer's successor was Joseph Koeth, an independent ex-officer and head of the former Ministry for Economic Demobilisation. Johannes Fuchs, acting Minister for the Occupied Territories, wanted to resign but was persuaded to remain in office. Finally, on 22 October, Gerhard von Kanitz, another independent who was close to the DVP and to landed interests within the DNVP, was appointed to Food and Agriculture.

== Members ==
The members of the cabinet were as follows:

| Portfolio | Minister | Took office | Left office | Party |
|---|---|---|---|---|
| Chancellorship | Gustav Stresemann | 6 October 1923 | 30 November 1923 | DVP |
| Vice-Chancellorship | Vacant | – | – | – |
| Foreign Affairs | Gustav Stresemann | 6 October 1923 | 30 November 1923 | DVP |
| Interior | Wilhelm Sollmann | 6 October 1923 | 2 November 1923 | SPD |
| Interior | Karl Jarres | 11 November 1923 | 30 November 1923 | DVP |
| Justice | Gustav Radbruch | 6 October 1923 | 2 November 1923 | SPD |
| Justice | Vacant | 3 November 1923 | 30 November 1923 | |
| Labour | Heinrich Brauns | 6 October 1923 | 30 November 1923 | Centre |
| Reichswehr | Otto Gessler | 6 October 1923 | 30 November 1923 | DDP |
| Economic Affairs | Joseph Koeth | 6 October 1923 | 30 November 1923 | Independent |
| Finance | Hans Luther | 6 October 1923 | 30 November 1923 | Independent |
| Food and Agriculture | Gerhard von Kanitz | 22 October 1923 | 30 November 1923 | Independent |
| Transport | Rudolf Oeser | 6 October 1923 | 30 November 1923 | DDP |
| Postal Affairs | Anton Höfle | 6 October 1923 | 30 November 1923 | Centre |
| Reconstruction | Robert Schmidt | 6 October 1923 | 2 November 1923 | SPD |
| Reconstruction | Vacant | 3 November 1923 | 30 November 1923 | |
| Occupied Territories | Johannes Fuchs | 6 October 1923 | 30 November 1923 | Centre |

== In office ==
The enabling act that was originally discussed in the first Stresemann cabinet was passed on 13 October. It gave the government the powers to implement by decree the measures it thought necessary to stop the ongoing hyperinflation. The most significant of the measures was the successful replacement of the all but worthless Papiermark with the stable Rentenmark on 15 November 1923. Due to a lack of gold reserves, the new currency was backed by a special forced mortgage placed on all land in Germany used for business or agricultural purposes.

The cabinet had to deal with several crucial issues that threatened Germany's integrity. The most pressing was the occupation of the Ruhr, which was closely connected to the issue of war reparations and a major cause of the economic collapse and hyperinflation brought on by the policy of passive resistance against the French and Belgian intervention.

Stresemann had announced the end of the Ruhr resistance on 26 September, but industrial production did not resume immediately. The second Stresemann cabinet was closely involved in negotiations that resulted in the MICUM Accord, a series of treaties signed between November 1923 and September 1924 that ended the ruinous period of work stoppages in heavy industry, which had resulted from passive resistance. Since the payments to the occupying nations did not reflect just a resumption of reparation payments but also included compensation for the occupation costs, they were seen as marking the failure of passive resistance and, ultimately, a capitulation by Germany to French demands.

During the occupation of the Ruhr, the French actively encouraged separatism in the Rhineland, which resulted in the establishment of two short-lived separatist and pro-French entities, the Rhenish Republic and the Autonomous Palatinate. Since they did not enjoy widespread support among the German population, they soon collapsed. The British government also resolutely opposed France's attempt to extend its sphere of influence permanently to all of Germany west of the Rhine.

Finally, there were regional challenges to the government's authority from the left in Thuringia and Saxony and from the right in Bavaria. On the left, the Social Democrats under Minister Presidents Erich Zeigner in Saxony and August Frölich in Thuringia allied with the Communist Party (KPD) and made use of the economic crisis and the threat of right-wing counter-revolution in Bavaria (see below) to set up armed militia called the Proletarian Hundreds that soon numbered around 100,000 men. It brought on a confrontation with the government in Berlin, which asked President Ebert to declare martial law and set into motion a process of military action called a Reichsexekution against the state governments of Saxony and Thuringia. On 23 October, Otto Gessler ordered the Reichswehr to move into both states. In Thuringia, the militias were disbanded and the communist ministers resigned. In Saxony, however, there was armed resistance, and Zeigner refused to remove the Communist ministers from his cabinet. Stresemann then appointed Rudolf Heinze Reich commissioner for Saxony. Heinze had the state government deposed and arrested.

In Bavaria – a hotbed of right-wing opposition against the democratic government in Berlin and home to numerous activists including Erich Ludendorff, Gustav von Kahr and Adolf Hitler – Minister President Eugen von Knilling refused to accept the authority of Stresemann's cabinet and appointed von Kahr as state commissioner, in effect establishing a right-wing dictatorship in Bavaria. It also declared martial law and considered a march on Berlin to depose the government. Local commanders disobeyed orders from Hans von Seeckt, the Reichswehr's commander in chief. Since von Seeckt refused to use military force against the Bavarian government, there was no repeat of the events in Saxony.

On 8/9 November, Hitler launched his Beer Hall Putsch in Munich, but von Kahr failed to side with him and had the attempted government takeover put down by local troops and police.

== Resignation ==
On 2 November 1923, the Social Democrats decided to withdraw from the cabinet, thereby ending the grand coalition. The cause was the toppling and arrest in late October of the Social Democratic-Communist state government of Saxony, which had been executed by former vice-chancellor and minister of justice Rudolf Heinze of the DVP. The SPD resented the use of a member of the DVP to carry out the removal of the elected government. SPD Chairman Hermann Müller was willing to accept it on the condition that the Berlin government take similar drastic steps to deal with the right-wing state government of Bavaria. This became the official position of the SPD Reichstag membership on 31 October. The SPD also demanded the end of the state of emergency in Saxony. The latter demand was refused by the DDP and DVP ministers. In a stormy cabinet meeting on 2 November, the issue came to a head and the SPD ministers resigned the next day.

With the move of the SPD into opposition to the cabinet in early November, the government's period in office was limited to the time before the Reichstag was next in session. The president of the chamber scheduled a session for 20 November. Motions of no confidence against the cabinet were to be expected on that day. Stresemann decided to go on the offensive, and the DDP and DVP introduced a motion of confidence. It was voted down on 23 November by 231 to 151 with 7 abstentions. Since it was not a vote of no confidence in the sense of Article 54 of the Weimar Constitution, there was no legal obligation for the cabinet to resign. Due to the parliamentary realities, the second Stresemann cabinet resigned the same day. It remained in office as an acting government until the formation of the Marx cabinet on 30 November.
