= First Marx cabinet =

1923–1924 cabinet of Weimar Germany

First Cabinet of Wilhelm Marx
- 10th Cabinet of Weimar Germany
- 30 November 1923 – 26 May 1924 (until 3 June 1924 as caretaker government)
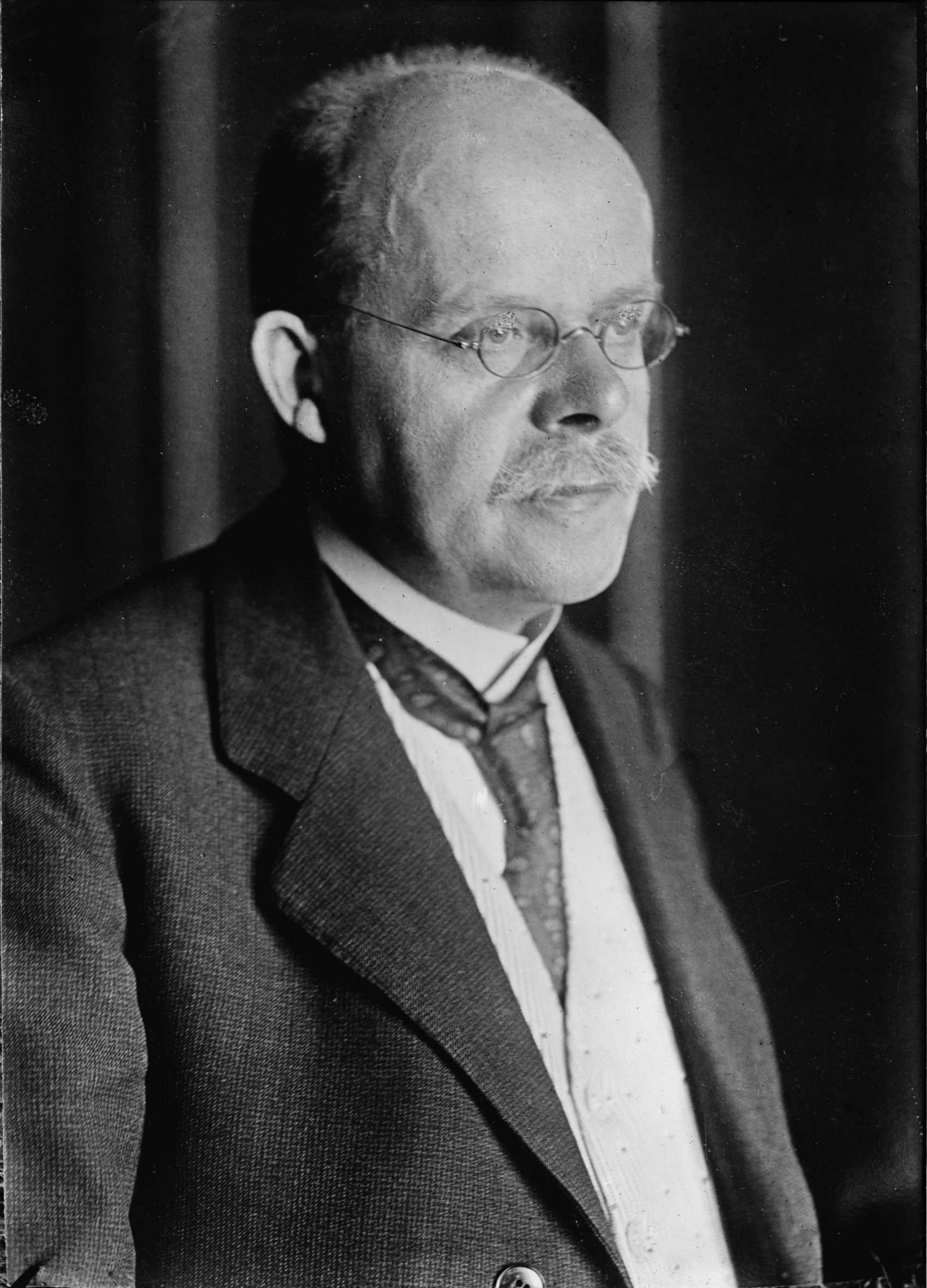
- Wilhelm Marx
- Date formed: 30 November 1923
- Date dissolved: 3 June 1924 (6 months and 4 days)

People and organisations
- President: Friedrich Ebert
- Chancellor: Wilhelm Marx
- Vice Chancellor: Karl Jarres
- Member parties: Centre Party; German People's Party; German Democratic Party
- Status in legislature: Minority coalition government
- Opposition parties: German National People's Party; Communist Party

History
- Election: 1920 federal election
- Legislature term: 1st Reichstag of the Weimar Republic
- Predecessor: Second Stresemann cabinet
- Successor: Second Marx cabinet

The first Marx cabinet, headed by Wilhelm Marx of the Centre Party, was the tenth democratically elected government during the Weimar Republic. It took office on 30 November 1923 when it replaced the Second Stresemann cabinet, which had resigned on 23 November after the Social Democratic Party (SPD) withdrew from the coalition. Marx's new cabinet was a minority coalition of three centre to centre-right parties.

The government used emergency decrees to handle Germany's deep economic problems caused by hyperinflation and large budget deficits. It gained control over a potentially separatist right-wing government in Bavaria. When the authorisation for the economic emergency decrees expired, it faced pressure to repeal many of the measures it had implemented and called for new elections in May 1924. The results left it weakened, and it resigned on 26 May 1924. It was replaced on 3 June by an unchanged second cabinet led by Marx.

== Establishment ==
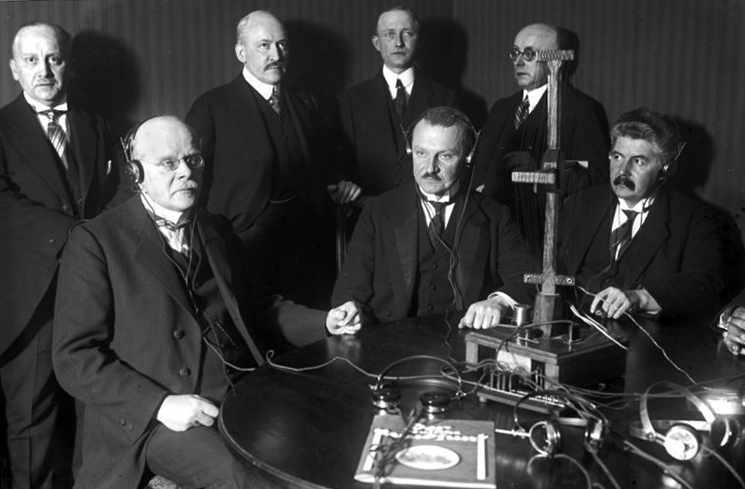
Members of the cabinet at a radio broadcast. Marx is at the left, sitting.

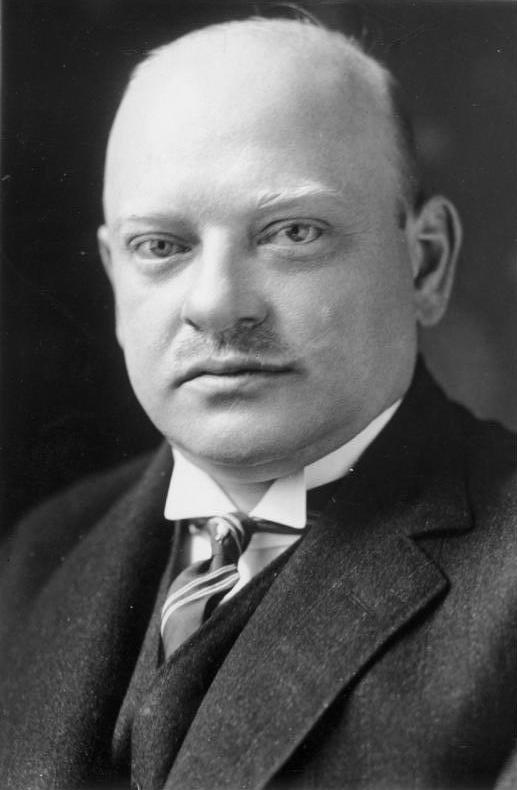
Gustav Stresemann (DVP), Foreign Minister

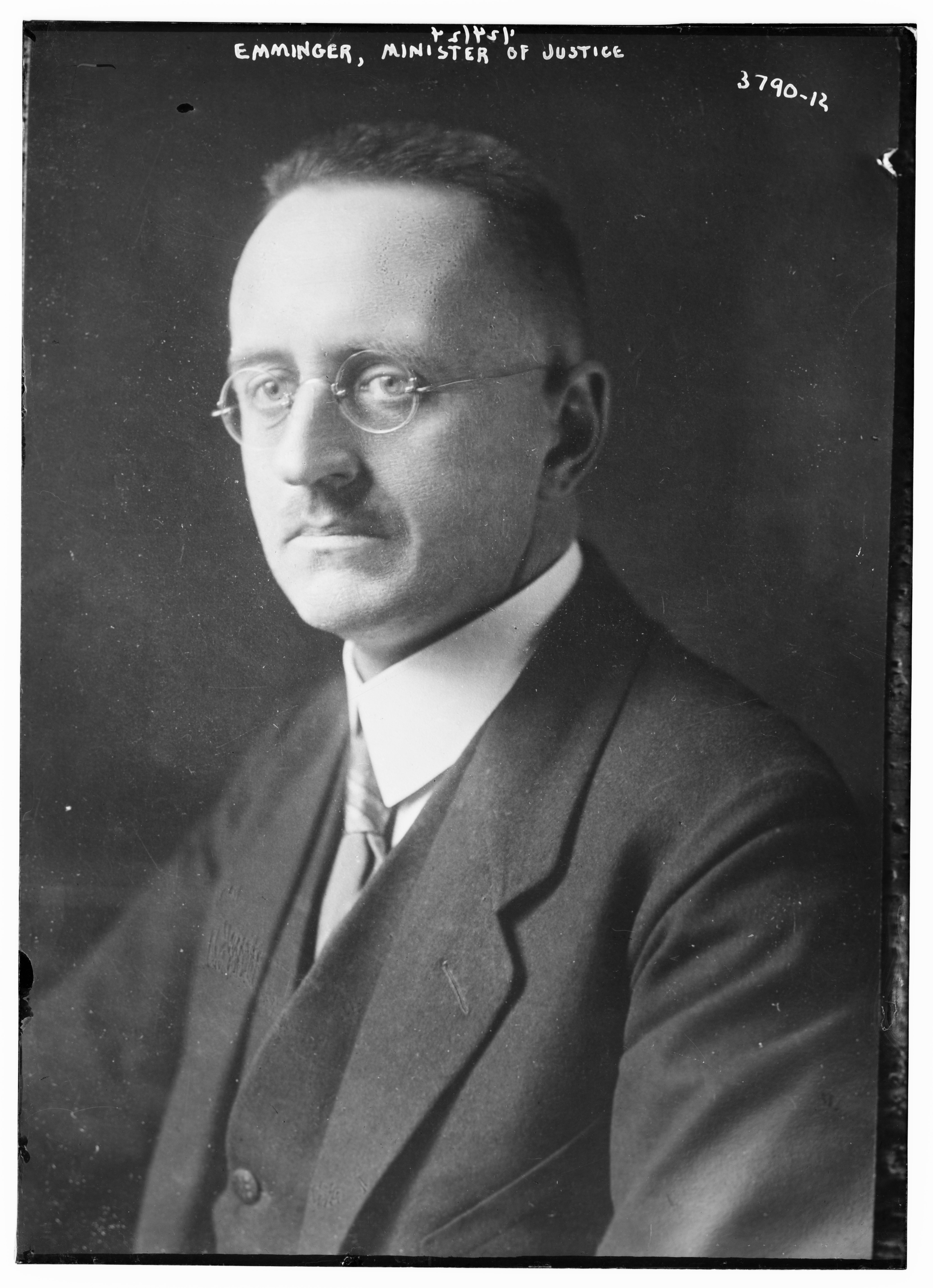
Erich Emminger (BVP), Minister of Justice

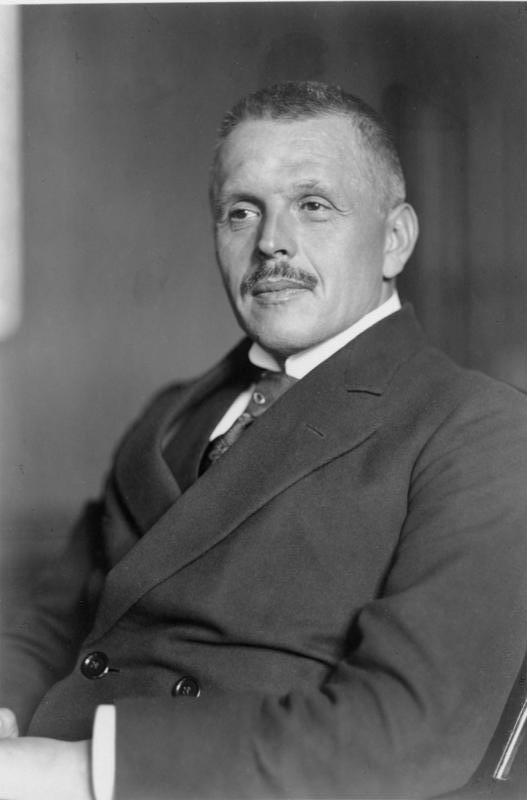
Otto Gessler (DDP), Reichswehr Minister

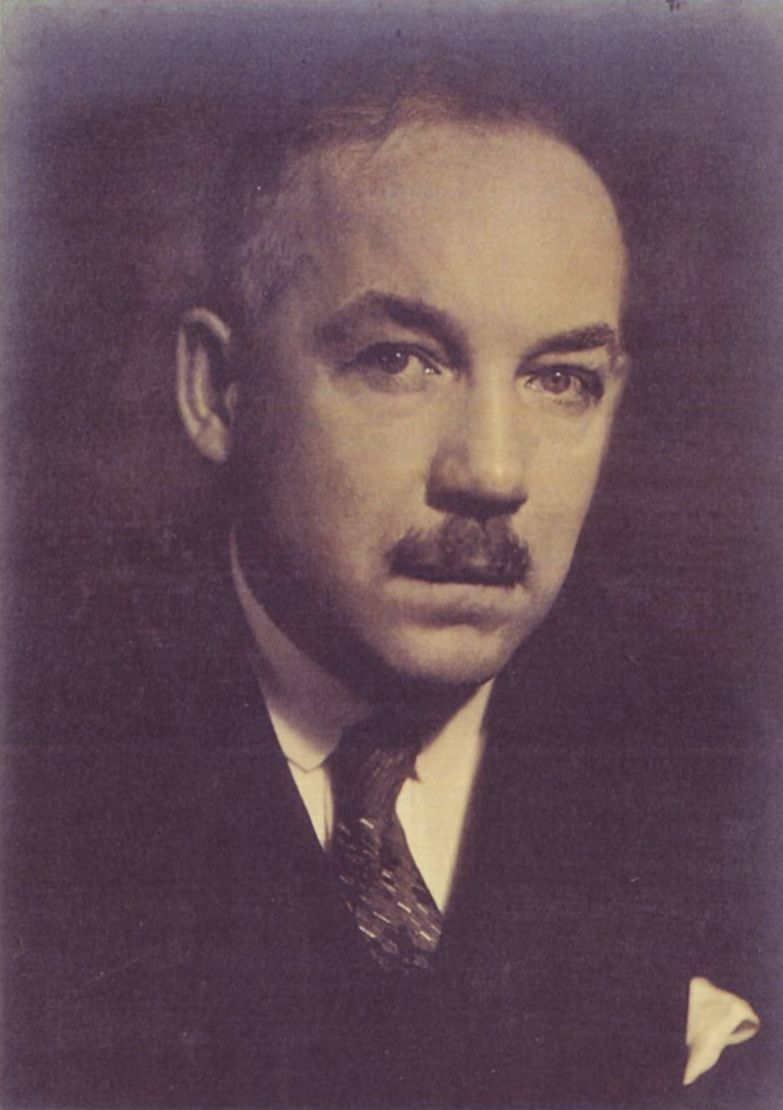
Eduard Hamm (DDP), Minister of Economic Affairs

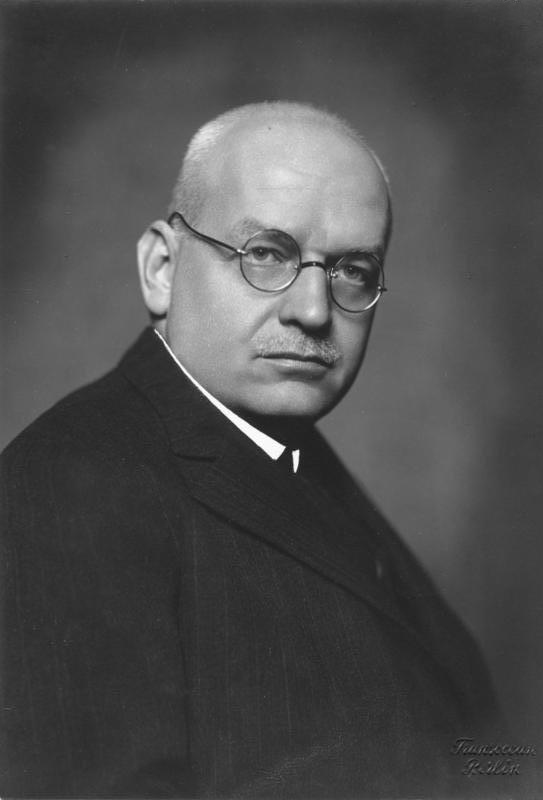
Hans Luther (Ind.), Minister of Finance

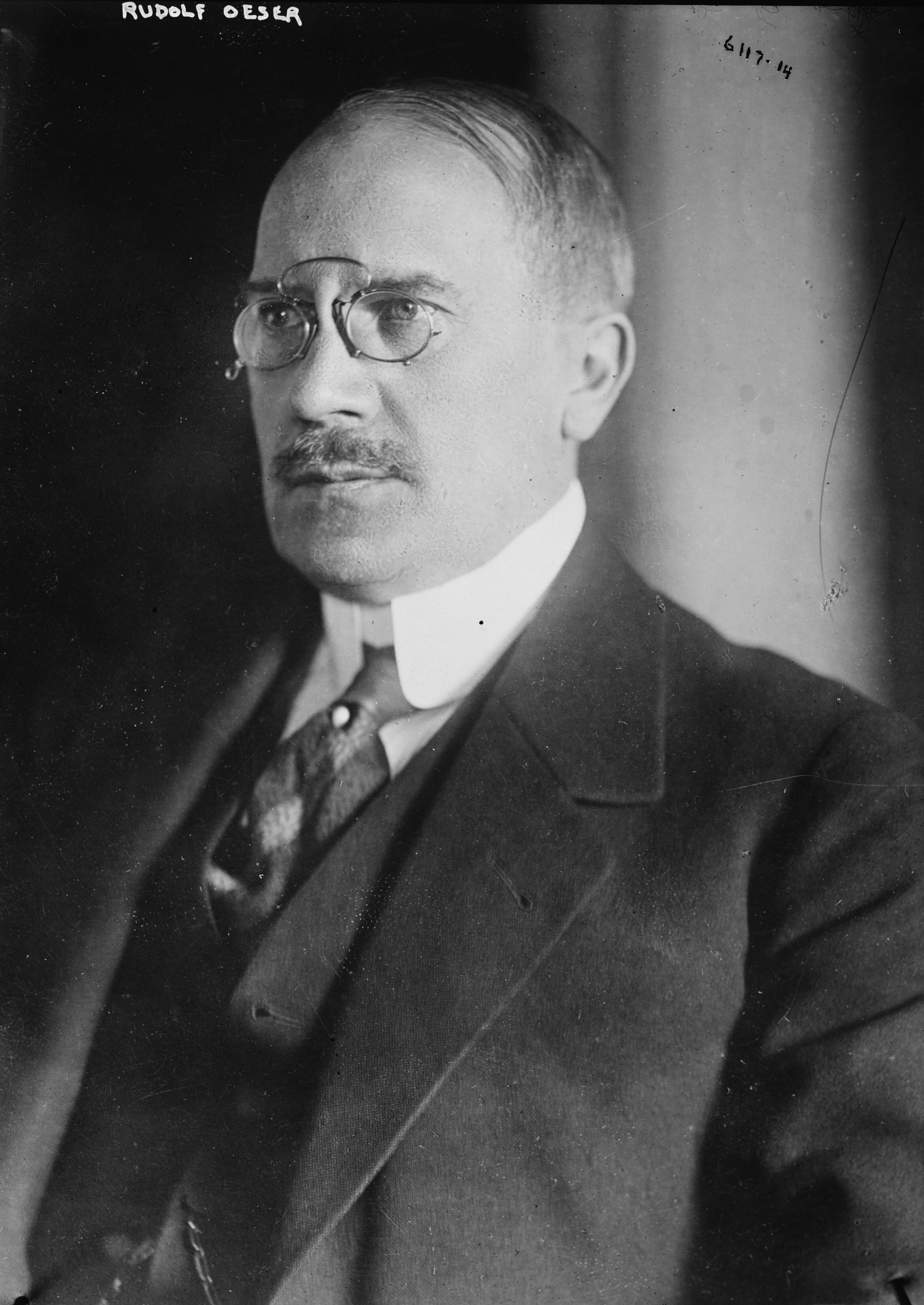
Rudolf Oeser (DDP), Minister of Transport

On 2 November 1923, the Social Democrats (SPD) withdrew from the second Stresemann cabinet in protest over its ouster of the democratically elected governments in Saxony and Thuringia after they had included the Communist Party in their ruling coalitions. The Stresemann government resigned following its loss in a confidence vote in the Reichstag on 23 November but remained in office in a caretaker capacity. The situation in Germany at the time was too critical to delay the formation of a new government. The major problems included the ongoing occupation of the Ruhr, a military state of emergency in place since 26 September 1923 and the dire state of public finances. Attempts to create a new coalition nevertheless proved to be difficult. A restoration of the grand coalition, including the SPD, seemed hopeless. The focus was on a new "bourgeois" cabinet based on the Centre Party, German People's Party (DVP), German Democratic Party (DDP) and the national-conservative German National People's Party (DNVP). Although among the coalition parties, the DVP was most amenable to inclusion of the DNVP, the other two parties also tacked to the right in the discussions.

Initially, the Centre (including Marx personally) refused to nominate a candidate for chancellor or to take the lead in coalition negotiations. Siegfried von Kardorff of the DVP was recommended by the DDP and Centre on 24 November 1923. Kardorff contacted the DNVP but was rebuffed. Stresemann then suggested to President Friedrich Ebert that he hand the task of forming a cabinet to the DNVP, but their political demands were unacceptable to Ebert. On 25 November, the President asked former Treasury minister Heinrich Albert to form an independent cabinet, but the idea was vetoed by the parties. A possible chancellorship for Karl Jarres (DVP) was dropped due to opposition from the Centre and DDP.

The next attempt was made under Adam Stegerwald of the Centre Party, and on 27 November, negotiations with the DNVP started. Although the right-wing DNVP was ready for some concessions, they demanded that members of their party be included not just in the national cabinet but also in the Prussian state government. The other parties refused to end their coalition with the SPD in Prussia, as would have been necessary to make it possible.

Stegerwald gave up on 29 November and asked Ebert to find a less controversial person for the job than himself. Ebert chose Wilhelm Marx, chairman of the Centre, who by the next day had managed to put together a DVP, DDP and Centre coalition. The Bavarian People's Party (BVP) sent one of their Reichstag delegates, Erich Emminger, to serve as minister of Justice, but as an independent minister without party affiliation. No formal coalition agreement was made.

The new cabinet showed much continuity with the previous one. The Centre, DVP and DDP agreed that Stresemann should keep the Foreign Office portfolio, which he had already held as chancellor. Jarres remained at Interior and also became vice-chancellor. Hans Luther, one of the architects of the currency reform, stayed on as Minister of Finance. Otto Gessler and Heinrich Brauns had held their posts since 1920. Rudolf Oeser and Anton Höfle stayed on, with the latter also taking over the Ministry for the Occupied Territories, recently created under Stresemann. Gerhard Graf von Kanitz, a former DNVP member, also remained in the cabinet after Georg Schiele (DNVP) refused the position at Food and Agriculture. The only new ministers were Eduard Hamm, a former Bavarian minister of trade and state secretary at the Reich chancellery of Wilhelm Cuno, and Emminger of the BVP. The latter appointment was intended to build a bridge to the Bavarian state government, at the time in more or less open rebellion against the Berlin government.

== Members ==
The members of the cabinet were as follows:

| Portfolio | Minister | Took office | Left office | Party |
|---|---|---|---|---|
| Chancellorship | Wilhelm Marx | 30 November 1923 | 3 June 1924 | Centre |
| Vice-Chancellorship | Karl Jarres | 30 November 1923 | 3 June 1924 | DVP |
| Foreign Affairs | Gustav Stresemann | 30 November 1923 | 3 June 1924 | DVP |
| Interior | Karl Jarres | 30 November 1923 | 3 June 1924 | DVP |
| Justice | Erich Emminger (Note: Emminger, although a member of the BVP, served as an independent minister without party affiliation. The BVP was not a formal coalition partner.) | 30 November 1923 | 15 April 1924 | BVP |
| Justice | Curt Joël (acting) | 15 April 1924 | 3 June 1924 | Independent |
| Labour | Heinrich Brauns | 30 November 1923 | 3 June 1924 | Centre |
| Reichswehr | Otto Gessler | 30 November 1923 | 3 June 1924 | DDP |
| Economic Affairs | Eduard Hamm | 30 November 1923 | 3 June 1924 | DDP |
| Finance | Hans Luther | 30 November 1923 | 3 June 1924 | Independent |
| Food and Agriculture | Gerhard von Kanitz | 30 November 1923 | 3 June 1924 | Independent |
| Transport | Rudolf Oeser | 30 November 1923 | 3 June 1924 | DDP |
| Postal Affairs | Anton Höfle | 30 November 1923 | 3 June 1924 | Centre |
| Ministry for Reconstruction (Note: The Ministry was dissolved on 11 May 1924.) | Gustav Müller (acting) | 30 November 1923 | 11 May 1924 | Independent |
| Occupied Territories | Anton Höfle (acting) | 30 November 1923 | 3 June 1924 | Centre |

== In office ==
=== Economic policy ===
The enabling act of 8 December 1923 gave the cabinet wide-ranging powers that made it possible for Marx to complete the currency reform begun under Stresemann's chancellorship with the introduction of the Rentenmark. It required massive adjustments to the public fiscal balance. Earlier large deficits financed by printing money had been a major cause of hyperinflation. Among the measures introduced by the cabinet were a 25% cut in the number of civil servants and various significant tax hikes. With the help of these unpopular decrees, the Marx government achieved the stabilisation of the currency through the "Miracle of the Rentenmark".

=== Domestic security ===
Marx followed a cautious course in dealing with rebellious state governments. He secretly met Eugen von Knilling, Minister President of Bavaria, on 18 January 1924 and convinced him to drop Gustav von Kahr and Otto von Lossow, two key figures in the right-wing movement in the state. Knilling also agreed to disband the illegal people's courts and to give up control of the railway, which was to be reorganised as the German National Railway. In compensation, Marx ordered that in the future the high command of the Reichswehr appoint and dismiss the state commander (Landeskommandant) for Bavaria in consultation with the state government.

In the Rhineland, Marx helped to defuse the situation by promising additional subsidies to the occupied territories on 6 December 1923. The improving economic circumstances soon boosted industrial output and resulted in falling unemployment in the region.

The first Marx cabinet maintained the unity of the nation by dealing with Bavaria, the occupied territories and the left-wing uprisings in Thuringia and Saxony. As Marx said in his government statement of 4 December 1923 when he asked the German people for understanding and the willingness to make additional sacrifices, the question was one of the very survival of the nation as a whole.

== Resignation ==
On 15 February 1924, the enabling act lapsed and there was no prospect of the Reichstag granting an extension. The parliament met on 20 February, and several draft laws were presented aimed at undoing some of the government's decrees, notably on taxes, working hours and cuts to the public workforce. The government decided to fight to keep the laws in place, since it saw them as cornerstones of its economic and fiscal policies. The opposition parties refused to withdraw their motions. Chancellor Marx then asked for the Reichstag to be dissolved on 13 March, arguing that vital decrees would otherwise be revoked. The elections of 4 May weakened the parties of the political centre and strengthened the extremes of the spectrum. The DDP and DVP in particular lost votes. The DNVP, in conjunction with the Agricultural League, had the largest parliamentary group (105 seats versus the SPD's 100), and demanded to be included in the government in a leading role.

Since the implementation of the Dawes Plan, which was intended to resolve the problems surrounding Germany's World War I reparations, required a government able to act decisively, the cabinet wished to stay on until the new Reichstag assembled. This resulted in criticism both from the DNVP, which called for the cabinet's resignation on 15 May, and from within the coalition parties. Coalition talks started on 21 May, but the DNVP refused to agree to the Dawes Plan, which they had labelled a "second Versailles" during the election campaign. Moreover, their preferred candidate for the chancellorship, former Grand Admiral Alfred von Tirpitz, proved very controversial.

On 26 May, the DVP forced the cabinet to resign. President Friedrich Ebert asked Marx to again form a new government. The DNVP demanded a change in foreign policy, the dismissal of Gustav Stresemann as foreign minister and a firm pledge regarding a change in the Prussian state government to include the DNVP. On 3 June, Marx broke off the negotiations, and on the same day, all the existing ministers were confirmed in their posts. The Centre Party, DDP and DVP again formed the coalition on which the second Marx cabinet was based.
