= Anton Höfle =

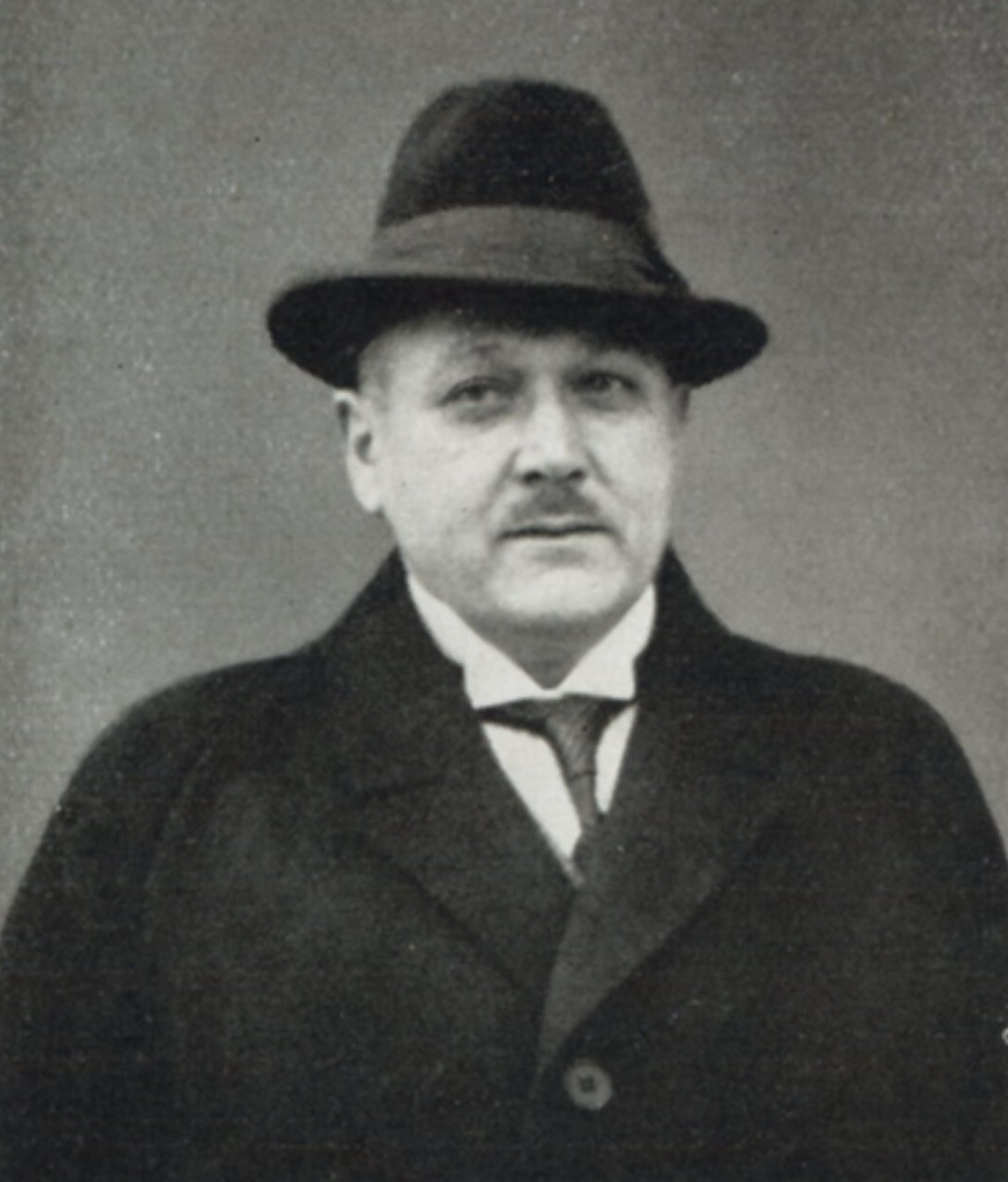

Anton Höfle (19 October 1882 – 20 April 1925) was a German trade unionist and politician of the Catholic Center Party during the era of the Weimar Republic.

== Biography ==
=== Early life and education ===
Höfle attended the Humanistisches Gymnasium in Kaiserslautern and studied law and political science in Munich and Erlangen, attaining a Phd in 1907. During that time he joined a catholic student organization and worked in the Handels- und Gewerbekammer München. Starting in 1914, he directed different trade unions, such as the Deutscher Technikerverbands (lit. German association of technicians) until 1919 and the Gesamtverband Deutscher Beamtengewerkschaften (German Civil Service Association).

=== Reichtstag career ===
Höfle was elected a member of parliament in June 1920, representing the then-electoral districts of Westfalen-North and Thuringia. Under Chancellor Gustav Stresemann, he was appointed Reichspostminister (Postal Minister) on 13 August 1923 and stayed in this office under the successive Chancellor Wilhelm Marx (see: First Marx cabinet, Second Marx cabinet) until 15 January 1925.

In the second Marx cabinet he was also appointed acting minister for the Occupied Territories on 30 November 1923.

=== Barmat-Scandal ===
During his term as a minister, Höfle approved a loan of 34,6m Reichsmark to the Barmat brothers, that could not be paid back. After this became public, Höfle resigned from his positions on 15 January 1925, gave up his membership of the parliament on 9 February 1925. He died shortly after.

== Film ==
Im 1960, Wolfgang Luderer directed a crime movie called Der Fall Hoefle (the case Hoefle).

== Works ==
- Kompaß für die Frau im Handwerk, 1913
- Behörden-Adreßbuch, 1922 ff.

== Literature and Sources ==
- Victor Schiff: Die Höfle-Tragödie. Geschichte eines Justizmordes. Verlag für Sozialwissenschaft, Berlin 1925.
- Christoph Albrecht-Heider: „Ich sehe der weiteren Entwicklung mit Ruhe entgegen“. Der Fall des Postministers Anton Höfle. In: Das Archiv. Magazin für Kommunikationsgeschichte. Heft 3/2017, S. 34–37, ISSN 1611-0838.
- Christoph Albrecht-Heider: Geschäfte mit Staatskrediten. Der Barmat-Skandal. In: Das Archiv. Magazin für Kommunikationsgeschichte. Heft 3/2017, S. 38–39, ISSN 1611-0838.
- Karin Jaspers, Wilfried Reininghaus: Westfälisch-lippische Kandidaten der Januarwahlen 1919. Eine biographische Dokumentation (= Veröffentlichungen der Historischen Kommission für Westfalen, Neue Folge, Bd. 52). Aschendorff, Münster 2020, ISBN 978-3-402-15136-5, S. 92–93.
