= Wilhelm Marx =

Chancellor of Germany, 1923–1925, 1926–1928

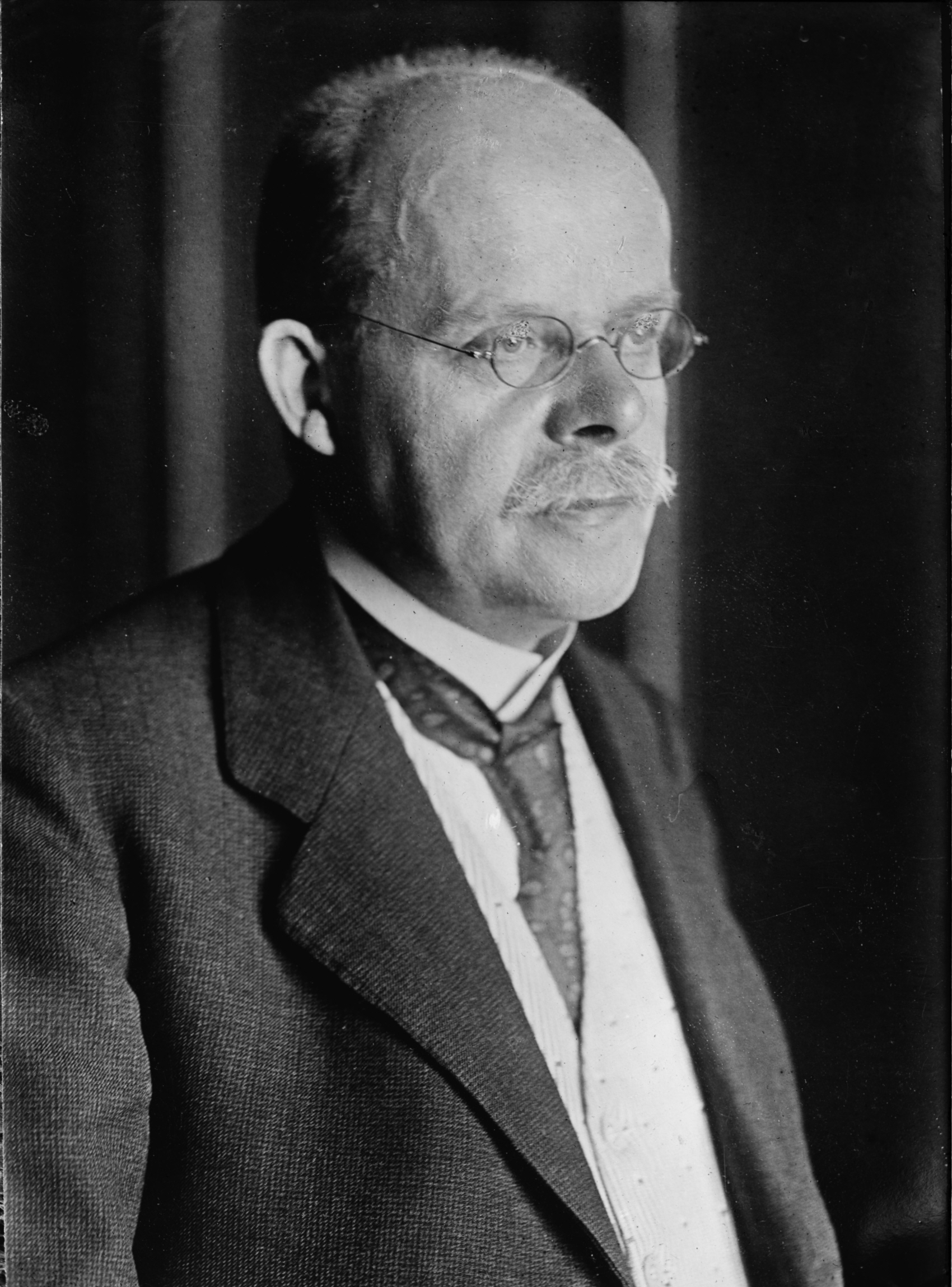
- Marx in 1923

Chancellor of Germany (Weimar Republic)
- In office 17 May 1926 – 28 June 1928
- President: Paul von Hindenburg
- Vice-Chancellor: Oskar Hergt
- Preceded by: Hans Luther
- Succeeded by: Hermann Müller
- In office 30 November 1923 – 15 January 1925
- President: Friedrich Ebert
- Vice-Chancellor: Karl Jarres
- Preceded by: Gustav Stresemann
- Succeeded by: Hans Luther

Minister of Justice
- In office 10 January 1926 – 12 May 1926
- Chancellor: Hans Luther
- Preceded by: Josef Frenken
- Succeeded by: Johannes Bell

Minister for the Occupied Territories
- In office 10 January 1926 – 12 May 1926
- Chancellor: Hans Luther
- Preceded by: Hans Luther
- Succeeded by: Johannes Bell

Minister President of Prussia
- In office 18 February 1925 – 6 April 1925
- Preceded by: Otto Braun
- Succeeded by: Otto Braun

Chairman of the Centre Party
- In office 17 January 1922 – 8 December 1928
- Preceded by: Karl Trimborn
- Succeeded by: Ludwig Kaas

Member of the Reichstag (Weimar Republic)
- In office 24 June 1920 – 10 June 1932
- Constituency: Thuringia (1928–1932); Düsseldorf East (1920–1928)

(German Empire)
- In office 2 March 1910 – 9 November 1918
- Constituency: Köln 6

Member of the Weimar National Assembly
- In office 6 February 1919 – 6 June 1920
- Constituency: Düsseldorf East

Personal details
- Born: Wilhelm Marx; 15 January 1863 Cologne, Kingdom of Prussia
- Died: 5 August 1946 (aged 83) Bonn, Germany
- Party: Centre
- Spouse: Johanna Verkoyen (m. 1891)
- Children: 4
- Education: University of Bonn
- Profession: Lawyer

Wilhelm Marx (15 January 1863 – 5 August 1946) was a German judge, lawyer, and politician who twice served as chancellor of Germany during the Weimar Republic, from 1923 to 1925 and again from 1926 to 1928. He also briefly held the position of Minister-President of Prussia in 1925. A leading figure in the Centre Party, he served as its chairman from 1922 to 1928. With a total tenure of three years and 73 days, he was the longest-serving chancellor of the Weimar Republic.

After being a member of the Reichstag of the German Empire for ten years, Marx was elected in 1919 to the Weimar National Assembly that drafted Germany's new constitution and then in 1920 to the Republic's Reichstag where he served until not long before the Nazi takeover. As chancellor, he helped steer Germany through the crisis year of 1923 with its hyperinflation and rebellious state governments. The following year, his government worked to end the immediate crisis over Germany's war reparations and then in 1927 successfully brought Germany into the League of Nations. His terms in office saw a number of progressive pieces of legislation pass, including family allowances for state employees and comprehensive unemployment insurance.

After resigning from the Reichstag in 1932, Marx worked with various civic organisations. He remained in Germany through the Nazi era and died in Bonn in 1946.

== Early life ==
Marx was born in 1863 in Cologne to the Catholic school rector Johann Marx (1822–1882) and his wife, Gertrude (1826–1909). He had a sister, Barbara, who later headed the Cologne Ursulines.

Marx was awarded his secondary school certificate (Abitur) at the Marzellengymnasium in 1881. He then studied jurisprudence at the University of Bonn from 1881 to 1884. As a student he became a member of Catholic Student Association Arminia of Bonn.

Marx married Johanna Verkoyen (1871–1946) in 1891. They had three sons and a daughter. One of the sons was killed in World War I.

== Legal career ==
In 1888, he passed the second state exam for the Prussian civil service and began working as an assessor in Cologne and Waldbröl and later at the land registry in Simmern. In 1894 he became a judge at Elberfeld, in 1904 state court judge (Landgerichtsrat) at Cologne, in 1907 superior state court judge (Oberlandesgerichtsrat) at Düsseldorf, in January 1921 state court president (Landgerichtspräsident) in Limburg an der Lahn and on 27 September 1921 senate president of the superior state court (Kammergericht) Berlin on the same day that he was elected president of the Reichstag parliamentary group of the Centre Party.

Prior to 1919, under the German Empire that was dominated by Protestant Prussia, his religion and political activities were a handicap for his career as a judge.

== Early political career ==
Marx started his political activities in Elberfeld, where he became active in the Centre Party. From 1899 to 1918, he was a member of the Prussian House of Representatives, the lower chamber of the state parliament (Landtag). From 1899 to 1904, he was the head of the Elberfeld Centre Party and from 1906 to 1919 deputy head of the party in the Prussian Rhine Province. In 1907, he became the chairman of the Düsseldorf Centre Party and in 1910 presided over the Augsburg Catholics Day. From 1910 to 1918, he was a member of the Reichstag for the Cologne district six. In 1911, he founded a Catholic school organisation in Düsseldorf to fight against the secularisation of the German school system.

Marx supported the Reichstag Peace Resolution of 1917 that called for a negotiated peace without the territorial gains that were popular among Rhineland Centre Party members. Following the end of World War I and the collapse of the German Empire, Marx was elected in 1919 to the Weimar National Assembly that drew up the Weimar Constitution. He was then a member of the Weimar Reichstag from 1920 until 1932. Marx condemned the German Revolution that overthrew the Hohenzollern monarchy but supported the new Weimar Republic. The Weimar Constitution explicitly made the exercise of civil rights independent of one's religious beliefs, unlike the imperial constitution, which did not mention religion at all. Marx opposed separatism in the Rhineland and argued against the creation of a Rhineland Republic in December 1918. In the summer of 1919, Marx was one of the few Centre Party members to support German acceptance of the Treaty of Versailles, since he feared that failure to do so would result in French annexation of the occupied Rhineland.

After the assassination of Matthias Erzberger by the right-wing terrorist group Organisation Consul in 1921, Marx became the head of the Centre Party's Reichstag parliamentary group on 27 September 1921 and, on 17 January 1922, party chairman. He supported Centre Party Chancellor Joseph Wirth in his "fulfillment policy" (Erfüllungspolitik) which attempted to comply as far as possible with the Treaty of Versailles, notably the reparation demands of the Allies, in order to show that it would be impossible to meet them. Independent Chancellor Wilhelm Cuno received Marx's help in mobilising civil disobedience against the Occupation of the Ruhr by France and Belgium. Marx then helped replace Cuno's cabinet with the grand coalition headed by Gustav Stresemann of the German People's Party (DVP). When Stresemann's government fell in November 1923, Reich President Friedrich Ebert requested that Marx form a government.

== Chancellor ==
=== First term, 1923–1925 ===
On 30 November 1923, Marx formed his minority first cabinet based on the Centre Party, the right-liberal German People's Party (DVP), the conservative Catholic Bavarian People's Party (BVP) and the center-left liberal German Democratic Party (DDP). The financial and economic situation of the Reich at the time was dire – Germany's hyperinflation peaked in late 1923 – and the central government's authority was challenged by right- and left-wing state governments as well as by separatism in the Rhineland. Marx pushed through the Enabling Act of December 1923 that gave his government the authority "to take such measures as it deems necessary and urgent in view of the plight of the people and the Reich". The government's achievements included stabilizing the currency following the introduction of the Rentenmark, fiscal consolidation, the resolution of the conflict between the Reich and Bavaria's right-wing government and de-escalation of tensions in the occupied Rhineland territories. In January 1924, the Emminger Reform replaced the system of trial by jury in Germany with a mixed system of career and lay judges that still exists today.

In social policy, Marx's government presided over the introduction of family allowances for state employees and the issuing of the Federal Social Welfare Decree on 13 February 1924. This was aimed at tackling the causes of destitution and helping all those in need. Poor law residence was replaced by usual residence, and the federal statutes (as noted by one study) "established the principle that persons who could not provide minimum subsistence for themselves and their dependents, and who did not receive help from others, were entitled to proper maintenance including food, clothing, housing, medical aid in case of sickness, and the aid required in order to recover working capacity". Apart from the basic relief rate for destitute persons in general, there were higher rates for certain groups, including social insurance pensioners, war invalids and survivors, and victims of inflation.

Following the May 1924 election, the second Marx cabinet was formed on 3 June. It was once again a minority government made up this time of the Centre Party, DVP and DDP; it lasted until December 1924. Its focus was on relations with the Allies and on regaining control of the occupied territories in the west. In August 2024, the government signed up to the Dawes Plan which settled the diplomatic crisis over Germany's war reparations. After the December 1924 Reichstag elections, Marx was unable to form a cabinet and resigned on 15 December. He remained in office as caretaker until 15 January 1925, when the independent Hans Luther took over as chancellor.

=== Between chancellorships, 1925–1926 ===
In February 1925, Marx became Minister President of Prussia following a call by the Centre Party in the state parliament. On 18 March, his party nominated him for the presidential election following the death of Reich President Friedrich Ebert. In the first round of voting, Marx was the candidate of the Centre Party and, in the second round, of the entire Weimar Coalition (Centre, DDP and Social Democrats). Marx received close to 4 million votes in the first round, but in the runoff was defeated by Paul von Hindenburg. His loss was attributed to the fact that the Bavarian People's Party, a sister party of the Centre, endorsed Hindenburg as a protest against the Marx's cooperation with the Social Democrats.

Some also attributed Marx's loss to the candidature of Ernst Thälmann of the Communist Party of Germany, who did not drop out in the second round. However, historian Peter Fritzsche rejected this view, calling the claim "far-fetched" and arguing that "given the explicit enmity of this party toward the Weimar "capitalist state", it would have been completely unrealistic to expect the KPD to support the candidate of the Weimar system". Fritsche instead found that the BVP's endorsement of Hindenburg was crucial to Marx's defeat.

Marx lost by 13.7 million to Hindenburg's 14.6 million votes. In April 1925, Otto Braun replaced Marx as Prussian Minister President. Marx had resigned after he was unable to form a working cabinet.

=== Second term, 1926–1928 ===
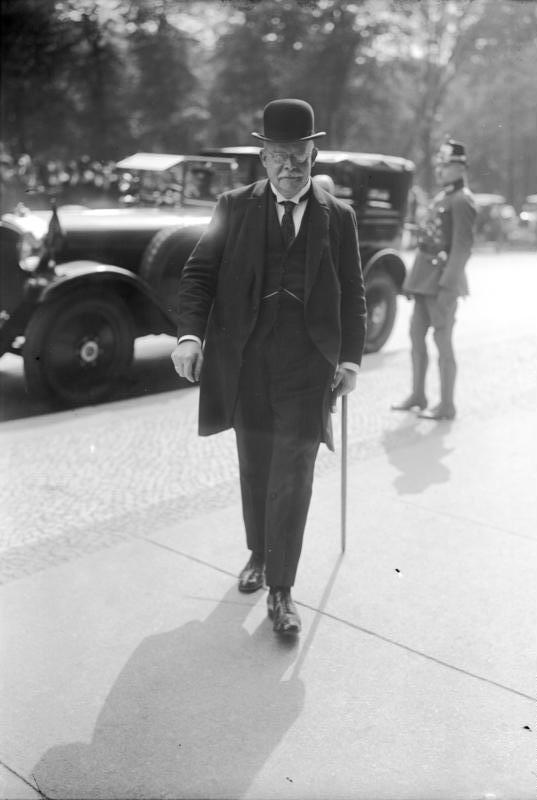
Centre Party leader Marx entering the Reichstag, June 1928

Marx considered leaving politics, but on 26 January 1926, he accepted an appointment as Minister of Justice and Minister for the Occupied Territories in the second cabinet of Hans Luther. After Luther's government fell, Gustav Stresemann suggested Marx as chancellor, and Hindenburg appointed him on 17 May 1926. His cabinet was formed from the Centre Party, DVP, DDP and BVP.

Even though Luther's government had fallen because of his decree allowing the old imperial flag to be flown alongside the Republic's in certain locations, Marx did not rescind it. In June 1926 a referendum to expropriate the assets of the former ruling houses of Germany without compensation failed to reach the fifty percent needed to pass. Marx's cabinet survived the referendum's failure and shortly afterwards succeeded in bringing Germany into the League of Nations. He resigned as chancellor on 17 December 1926 when he lost an SPD-initiated vote of no confidence on the issue of the recently uncovered clandestine military relations between the Reichswehr and the Soviet Union.

In January 1927, Marx formed a new government with the same parties as before but with the addition of the right-wing German National People's Party (DNVP). The fourth and final Marx cabinet extended the 1922 Law for the Protection of the Republic, although in order to gain the DNVP's support the extension was limited to two years. It also passed a law on working hours (14 April 1927) as well as the Law on Employment Services and Unemployment Insurance (Gesetz über Arbeitsvermittlung und Arbeitslosenversicherung) of 16 July 1927 which established a comprehensive unemployment insurance system. The government sought to standardise locally administered poor relief payments by fixing them in line with the prices of essential goods, and Germany became the first major industrial nation to sign the Washington Agreement for extended maternity leave.

Although the coalition broke up over the issue of the School Law (Reichsschulgesetz) and the blame was put on the DVP, it was mostly internal opposition within the Centre Party, notably by Joseph Wirth, Adam Stegerwald and Theodor von Guérard that resulted in the cabinet's fall. Marx resigned on 12 June 1928. After putting into action an emergency program, he was dismissed as chancellor by Hindenburg on 29 June 1928. In total, his four terms in office made him the longest-serving Reich chancellor of the Weimar Republic.

== Later life ==
After the Centre Party's poor performance at the polls in May 1928, Marx resigned as party chairman on 8 December 1928. He then focused on work for numerous associations and civil organisations. In 1932, he resigned his seat in the Reichstag and retired.

In 1933, under Nazi Germany, Marx was charged in the trial of the People's Association for Catholic Germany, an organisation which he had chaired, but the charge against him was dropped in 1935. After the end of World War II, he continued to live in Bonn, where he died in 1946. Marx is buried at the Melaten cemetery in Cologne.

Political offices
Preceded by Gustav Stresemann	Chancellor of Germany; 1923 – 1925	Succeeded by Hans Luther
Preceded by Otto Braun	Prime Minister of Prussia; 1925	Succeeded by Otto Braun
Preceded by Hans Luther	Chancellor of Germany; 1926 – 1928	Succeeded by Hermann Müller
