= Eduard Hamm =

German lawyer and politician (1881–1944)

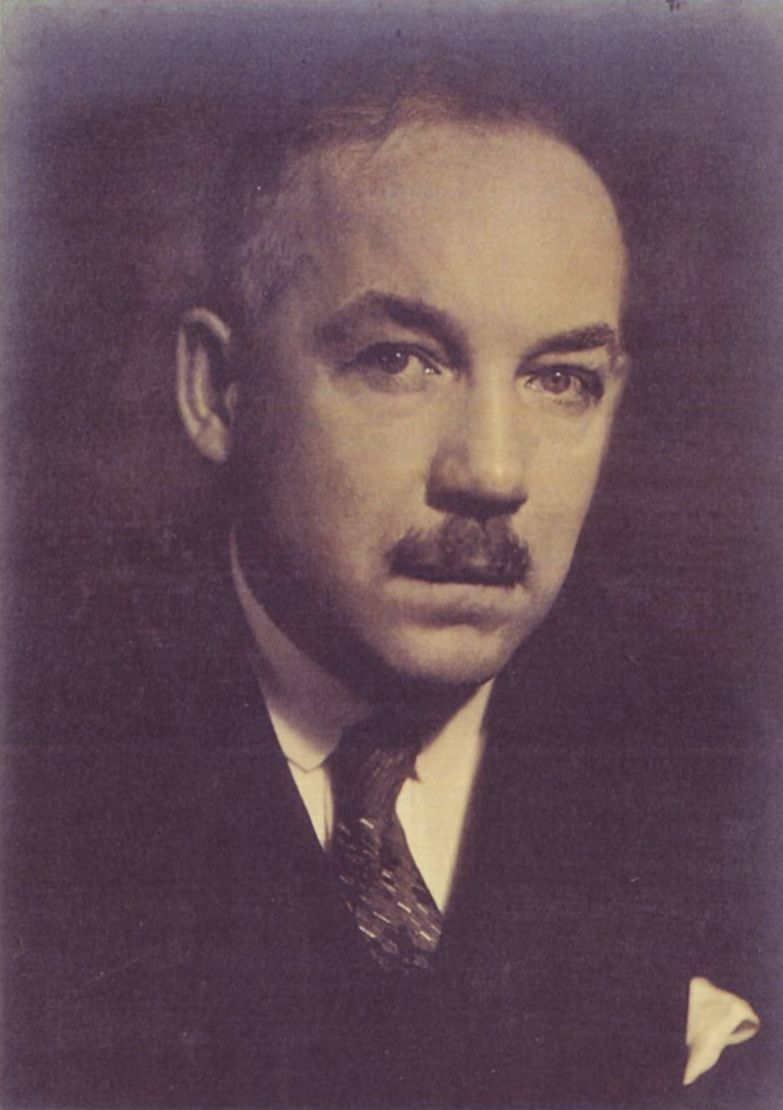
- Born: 7 March 1881; Munich, German Empire
- Died: 2 September 1944 (aged 63); Berlin, Nazi Germany
- Education: LMU Munich
- Occupations: Lawyer, politician
- Spouse: Maria von Merz
- Children: 2 daughters, 1 son

Eduard Hamm (7 March 1881 – 2 September 1944) was a German lawyer and politician who served in several government positions during the Weimar Republic. Hamm studied law at the Ludwig-Maximilians-Universität München (LMU) and subsequently worked in the Bavarian civil service. He later became a member of the Bavarian Landtag and the German Reichstag, representing the German Democratic Party. Hamm served as Minister for Trade, Industry and Commerce in the government of the Free State of Bavaria from 1919 to 1922, and later as Reich Minister for Economics under Chancellor Wilhelm Marx.

After retiring from politics in 1933, Hamm worked as a lawyer in Berlin and Munich. He was arrested by the Gestapo in 1944 following the 20 July Plot and died under mysterious circumstances in prison. Hamm was married to Maria von Merz and had three children.

== Early life ==
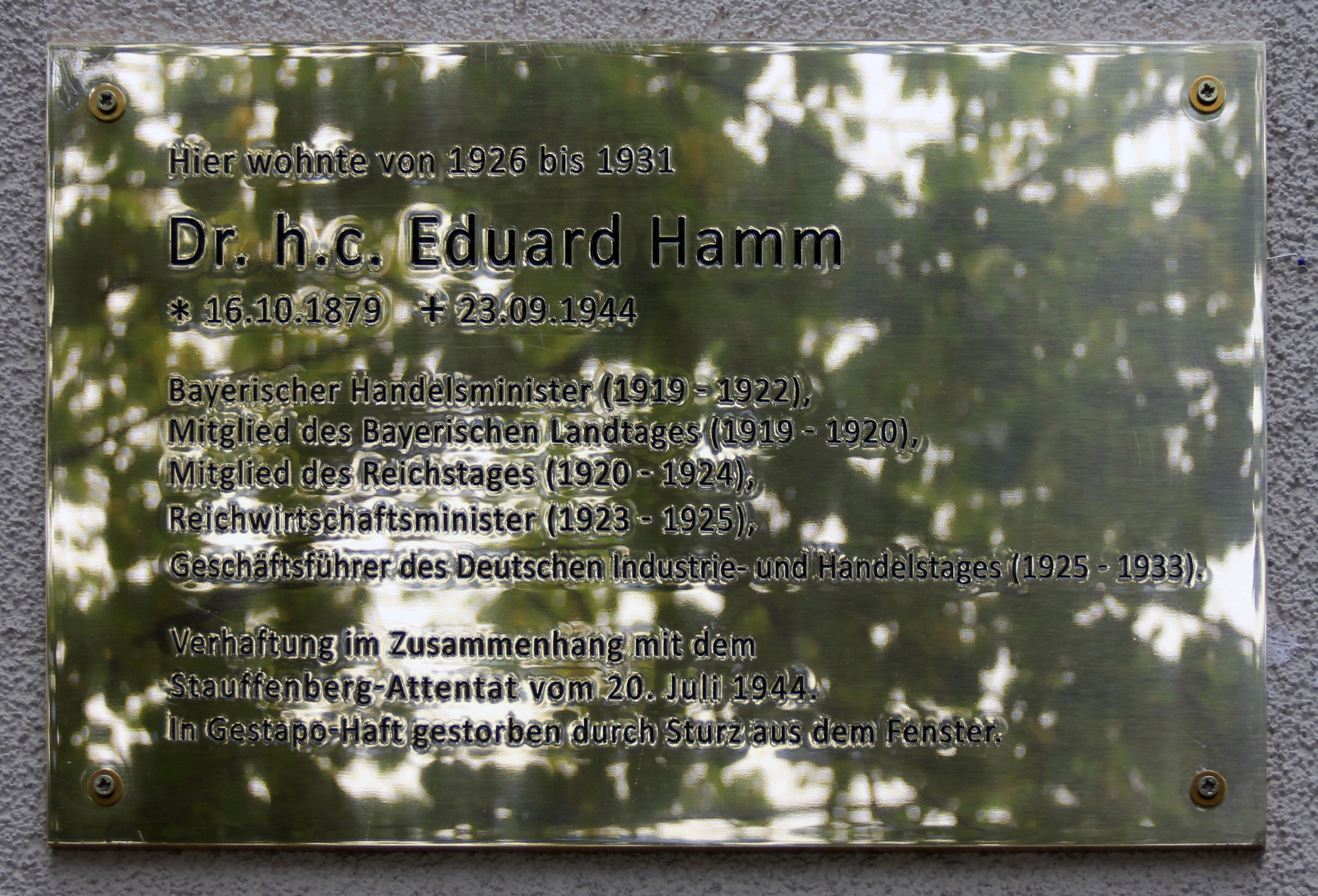
Memorial plaque at the house, Otto-Suhr-Allee 143, in Berlin-Charlottenburg

The son of an Oberlandesgerichtsrat attended high schools in Metten and Deggendorf and graduated from Gymnasium at St. Stephan in Augsburg. He then began studying law at the Ludwig-Maximilians-Universität München (LMU) and passed the first exam in 1902 and the second in 1905. Hamm was a scholarship holder of the Maximilianeum Foundation and a member of the Academic Choral Society, Munich.

After passing the exam, Hamm entered the Bavarian civil service and worked as a "helper" (Hilfskraft) in the Bavarian Ministry of Justice from 1906, then as a Third Public Prosecutor at the District Court of Munich II, as a legal advisor in Lindau (Bodensee), and as an assessor in the district office of Memmingen in 1908/09.

In 1911, he was appointed to the Bavarian Ministry of the Interior and in 1916 was seconded from it as a board member to the Central Purchasing Company. Subsequently, he worked as a councilor at the War Food Office in Berlin until he returned to the Bavarian Ministry of the Interior in 1917. In early 1918, he became a Legation Councilor in the Trade Department of the Bavarian State Ministry of Foreign Affairs.

== Political career ==
After the November Revolution and the end of the Munich Soviet Republic, Hamm was a member of the Bavarian State Parliament from 15 July to 14 October 1920. He resigned his seat in the state parliament after being elected to the Reichstag of the Weimar Republic in the June 1920 German federal election, where he served until 1924.

From 31 May 1919 to 24 July 1922, Hamm was Minister for Trade, Industry and Commerce in the governments of the Free State of Bavaria led by the Prime Ministers Hoffmann, von Kahr and Lerchenfeld-Köfering. In 1922/1923, he was a State Secretary in the Reich Chancellery under Wilhelm Cuno, and from 30 November 1923, to 15 January 1925, he was Reich Minister of Economics under Chancellor Wilhelm Marx.

After leaving the federal government, Hamm was a member of the executive board of the German Industry and Commerce Day from 1925 to 1933, a member of the Provisional Reich Economic Council and editor of the Deutsche Wirtschaftszeitung [German Economic Newspaper], in which he criticized the economic program of the National Socialist German Workers' Party.

As early as 1920/1921, Hamm had denounced the "anti-Semitic propaganda" of the National Socialists in the Bavarian cabinet and had requested a ban on the Völkischer Beobachter. After the Nazi regime took power, Hamm was retired in 1933. He withdrew from active political life and worked as a lawyer in Berlin and Munich in the following years. He continued to maintain contacts, especially with the resistance circle around Otto Geßler, Franz Sperr and Carl Friedrich Goerdeler. In the event of a coup, he was intended to serve as a provisional governor for Bavaria in the Shadow Cabinet of Beck/Goerdeler.

After the assassination attempt on Hitler in 1944, Hamm was arrested on 2 September as part of the "Operation Grid" by the Gestapo and taken to the Lehrter Straße prison in Berlin, where he died under circumstances that have still not been clarified. According to a Gestapo officer's testimony, he had jumped out of a window during an interrogation and died as a result of the fall. The suicide theory was later repeated in literature and interpreted to mean that Eduard Hamm wanted to avoid revealing the names of accomplices.

== Personal life ==
Eduard Hamm was married to Maria von Merz since 1907, with whom he had two daughters and a son. The historian Wolfgang Hardtwig is his grandson.

== Legacy ==
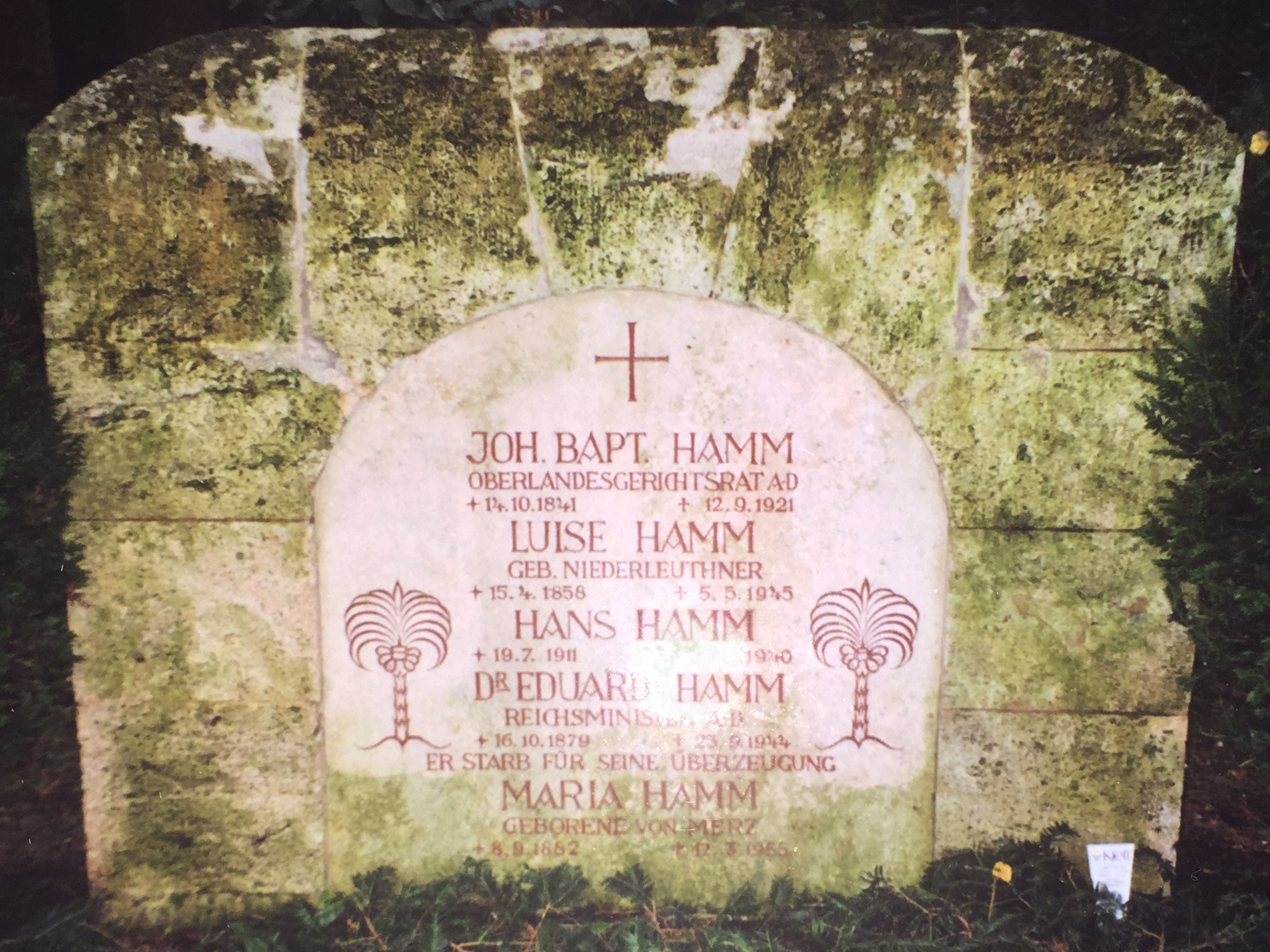
Honorary grave at the Waldfriedhof Munich.

He is buried in the Munich Waldfriedhof; his grave was declared an honorary grave by Mayor Christian Ude. Part of his estate has been in the Passau City Archives since 2017.
