= May 1924 German federal election =

- 4 May 1924

All 472 seats in the Reichstag 237 seats needed for a majority
- Registered: 38,374,983 (▲6.7%)
- Turnout: 77.4% (▼1.8pp)
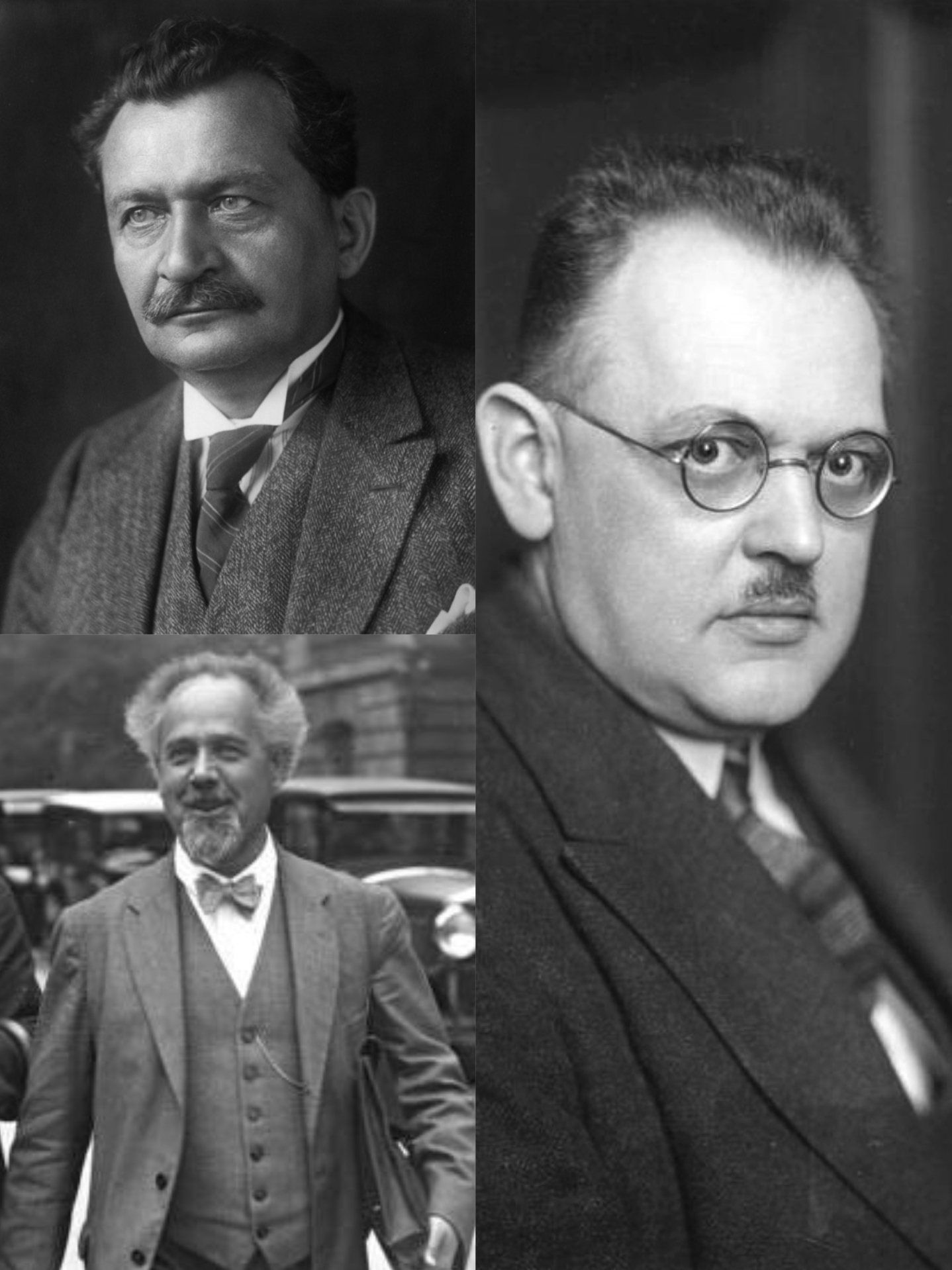

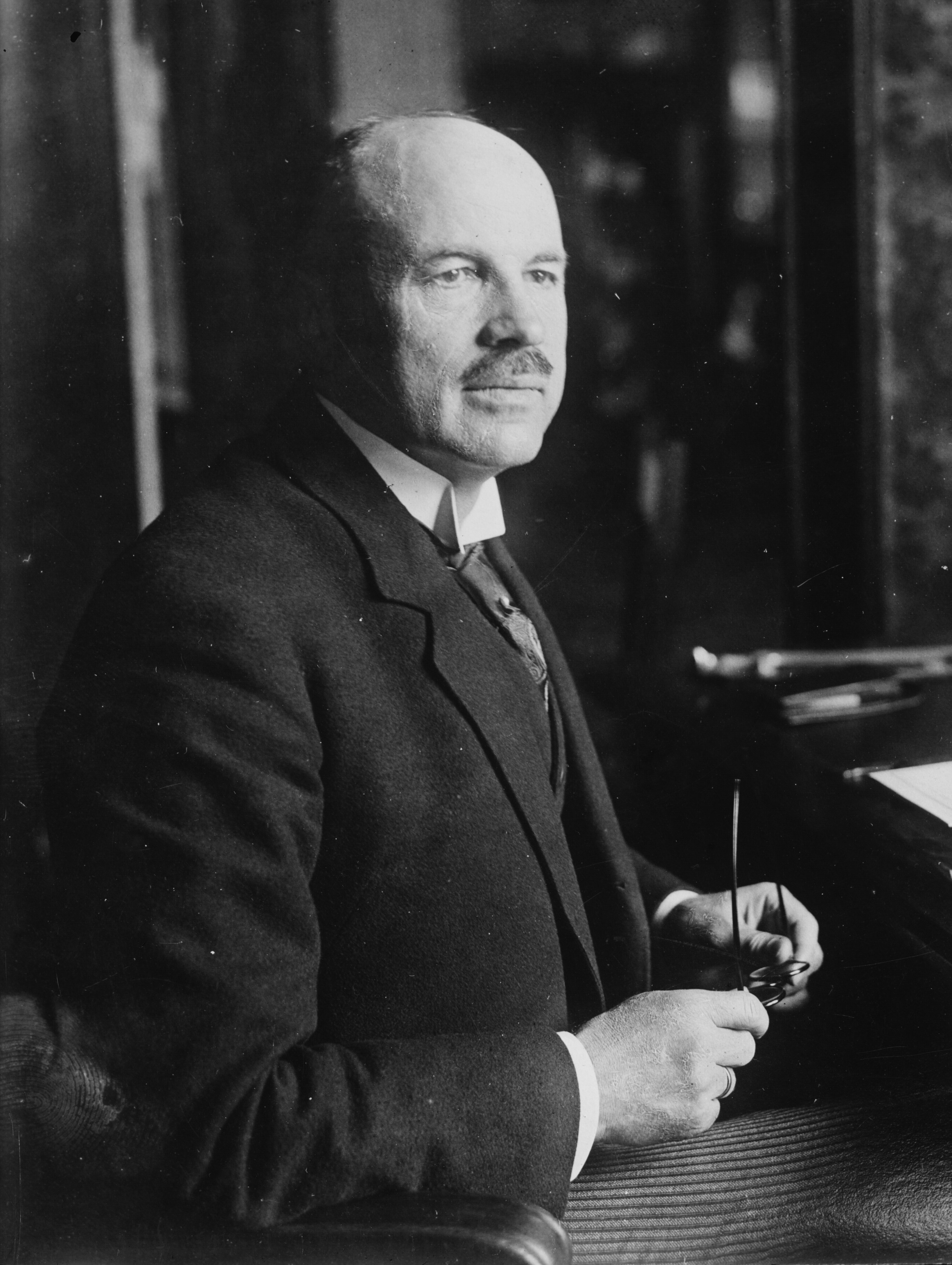

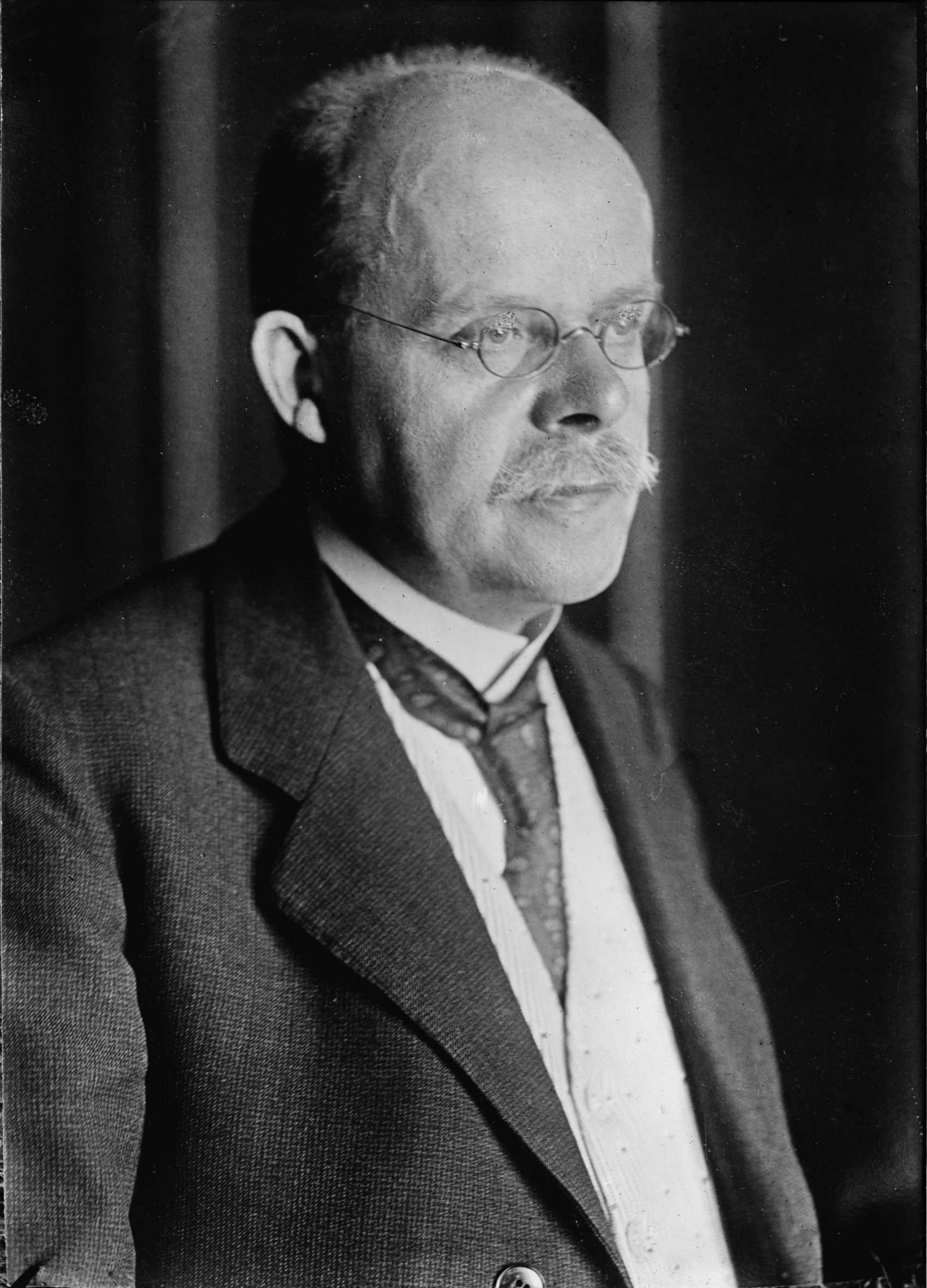

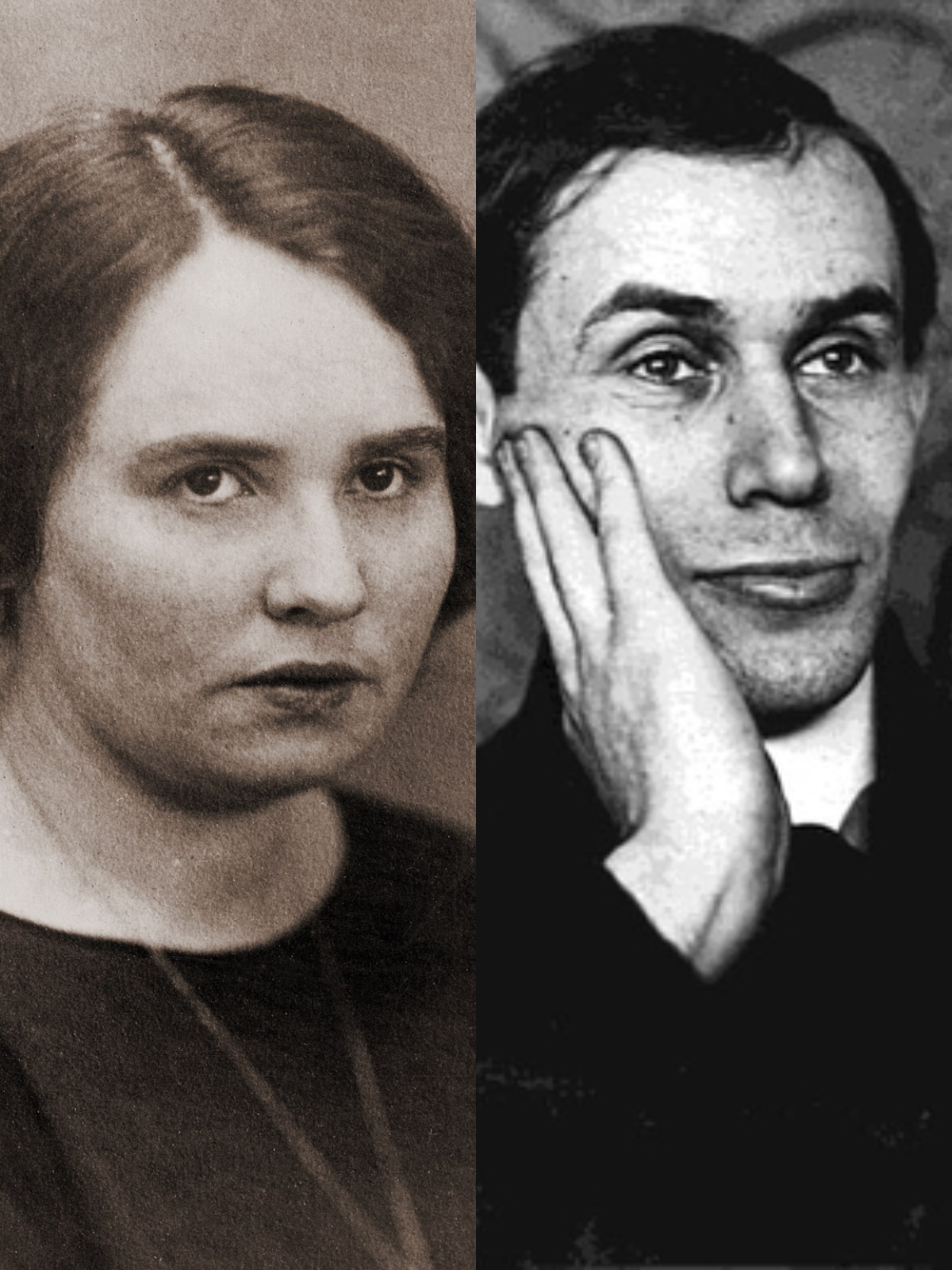

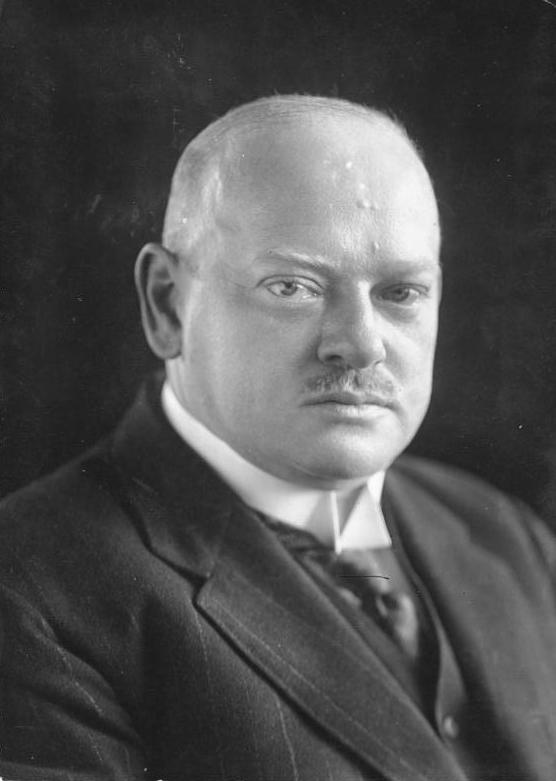

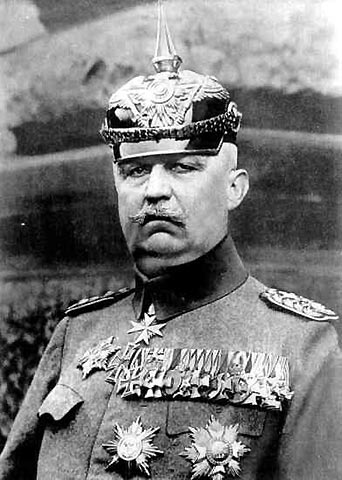
	First party	Second party	Third party
Leader	Hermann Müller; Otto Wels; Arthur Crispien	Oskar Hergt	Wilhelm Marx
Party	SPD	DNVP	Centre
Last election	21.9%, 103 seats	15.1%, 71 seats	13.6%, 64 seats
Seats won	100	95	65
Seat change	▼3	▲24	▲1
Popular vote	6,008,905	5,696,475	3,914,379
Percentage	20.5%	19.5%	13.4%
Swing	▼1.4 pp	▲4.4 pp	▼0.2 pp
	Fourth party	Fifth party	Sixth party
Leader	Ruth Fischer & Arkadi Maslow	Gustav Stresemann	Erich Ludendorff
Party	KPD	DVP	NSFP
Last election	2.1%, 4 seats	13.9%, 65 seats	Did not exist
Seats won	62	45	32
Seat change	▲58	▼20	New party
Popular vote	3,693,280	2,694,381	1,918,329
Percentage	12.6%	9.2%	6.5%
Swing	▲10.5 pp	▼4.7 pp	New party
Government before election
First Marx cabinet
Z–DVP–BVP–DDP
Government after election
Second Marx cabinet
Z–DVP–DDP

A federal election for the second Reichstag of the Weimar Republic was held in Germany on 4 May 1924. It took place following a series of national crises in 1923, most notably the occupation of the Ruhr by French and Belgian troops and the resulting period of hyperinflation. The election campaign was marked by strong ideological differences over how the government had handled the problems. In the voting, the parties of the far left and far right made significant gains at the expense of the moderate parties that had been in the government or had supported it.

The splintered party groupings in the new Reichstag made it impossible to form a majority coalition. The government led by Wilhelm Marx of the Centre Party therefore continued in office, but his cabinet – already the eleventh government of the Weimar Republic – lasted only a little over six months before Marx requested a new election.

== Background ==
The election of 4 May 1924 took place in the wake of a number of national crises during the previous year: hyperinflation, the occupation of the Ruhr, the Beer Hall Putsch and conflicts between the federal and state governments, especially in Saxony and Thuringia (the attempted communist takeover known as the German October) and in Bavaria. A national state of emergency was declared on 27 September in response to Bavaria's refusal to implement certain national laws. The hyperinflation was controlled with the introduction of a new currency in November 1923, and the government was able to bring the Allies of World War I to the table on the issue of the Ruhr and Germany's war reparations. When the state of emergency lapsed in March 1924, Chancellor Wilhelm Marx, faced with parliamentary opposition to a number of the decrees issued by his minority centre-right government, requested the dissolution of the Reichstag for a new election.

== Campaign ==
The election campaign brought out the strong differences of opinion among the parties over the government's currency stabilization measures during the state of emergency. The conflicts became even more apparent following the release in mid-campaign of the Dawes Committee's report, which laid out a plan for Germany to pay the war reparations it owed under the Treaty of Versailles. The government, made up of the Catholic Centre Party, the German People's Party (DVP) and the German Democratic Party (DDP), took the opportunity to emphasize the positive aspects of the Dawes Plan, such as its promise that foreign troops would be withdrawn from the Ruhr, and to point out that the currency stabilization program had succeeded. The German National People's Party (DNVP) countered by calling the Dawes Plan a "second Versailles", and the Communist Party of Germany (KPD) denounced it as an "enslavement of the German proletariat". Within the Social Democratic Party (SPD), a group centered around Otto Wels wanted a coalition with the bourgeois parties, but the left wing around Paul Levi saw the role of the SPD in a principled opposition.

The Nazi Party had been banned by the Reich government following Adolf Hitler's failed Beer Hall Putsch in November 1923, and at the time of the election campaign Hitler was in prison. The Nazis ran as the National Socialist Freedom Movement (NSFP) in a combined electoral list with the German Völkisch Freedom Party (DVFP), which had also been banned after the putsch. The wing of the Nazis centering around Hermann Esser and Julius Streicher opposed both the party union and participation in the election. The majority of the 32 representatives elected by the NSFP in May 1924 were originally members of the DVFP and not the Nazi Party.

== Electoral system ==
The Reichstag was elected via party list proportional representation. For this purpose, the country was divided into 35 multi-member electoral districts. A party was entitled to a seat for every 60,000 votes won. This was calculated via a three-step process on the constituency level, an intermediate level which combined multiple constituencies, and finally nationwide, where all parties' excess votes were combined. In the third nationwide step, parties could not be awarded more seats than they had already won on the two lower constituency levels. Due to the fixed number of votes per seat, the size of the Reichstag fluctuated between elections based on the number of voters.

The voting age was 20 years. People who were incapacitated according to the Civil Code, who were under guardianship or provisional guardianship, or who had lost their civil rights after a criminal court ruling were not eligible to vote.

== Results ==
The election resulted in losses for the parties of the moderate centre that had been part of the government in the previous year, particularly the DVP, which lost 20 seats, and the DDP, which lost 11. The Centre Party managed to hold its own and gained one additional seat. The SPD's loss of just three seats appeared outwardly to have been modest, but behind it lay the fact that in 1922 it had merged with the Independent Social Democrats (USPD), which had won almost five million votes and 83 seats in 1920. The SPD's losses between 1920 and 1924 show that it was unable to retain the former supporters of the USPD. Most of them turned to the KPD.

Parties of the far right and far left made the greatest advances. The radical nationalist German National People's Party (DNVP) with 95 seats very nearly surpassed the SPD's 100. The Agricultural League, a new party with which the DNVP was closely allied, won 19 seats. The National Socialist Freedom Movement, which the banned Nazi Party had joined, picked up 32 seats with 6.5% of the vote. On the left of the spectrum, the KPD, with the help of former USPD voters, won 58 more seats than in 1920 and almost 13% of the vote.

Party	Votes	%	+/–	Seats	+/–
Social Democratic Party	6,008,905	20.52	−1.40	100	−3
German National People's Party	5,696,475	19.45	+4.38	95	+24
Centre Party	3,914,379	13.37	−0.27	65	+1
Communist Party of Germany	3,693,280	12.61	+10.52	62	+58
German People's Party	2,694,381	9.20	−4.70	45	−20
National Socialist Freedom Movement	1,918,329	6.55	New	32	New
German Democratic Party	1,655,129	5.65	−2.63	28	−11
Bavarian People's Party	946,648	3.23	−0.93	16	−4
Agricultural League	574,939	1.96	New	10	New
Economic Party of the German Middle Class	500,820	1.71	New	7	New
German Social Party	333,427	1.14	+1.06	4	+4
German-Hanoverian Party	319,792	1.09	−0.04	5	0
Independent Social Democratic Party	235,145	0.80	−16.83	0	−83
Bavarian Peasants' League	192,786	0.66	−0.12	3	−1
Christian Social People's Community	124,451	0.43	New	0	New
Polish People's Party	100,260	0.34	New	0	New
National Freedom Party	62,071	0.21	New	0	New
Geusen League	59,222	0.20	New	0	New
Party of Tenants	45,920	0.16	New	0	New
Republican Party of Germany	45,722	0.16	New	0	New
German Workers' Party	36,291	0.12	New	0	New
Free Economy Union F.F.F.	36,013	0.12	New	0	New
Socialist League	26,418	0.09	New	0	New
Haeusser Alliance	24,451	0.08	New	0	New
Wendish People's Party	10,827	0.04	+0.01	0	0
National Block	9,561	0.03	New	0	New
Schleswig Club	7,620	0.03	+0.01	0	0
Bavarian Middle Class League – Southern Region	5,659	0.02	New	0	New
Independent Economic Group	1,848	0.01	New	0	New
Masurian Union	1,029	0.00	New	0	New
Total	29,281,798	100.00	–	472	+13
Valid votes	29,281,798	98.56			
Invalid/blank votes	427,582	1.44			
Total votes	29,709,380	100.00			
Registered voters/turnout	38,374,983	77.42			
Source: Gonschior.de

== Aftermath ==
No clear majority could be formed in the new Reichstag. The German People's Party forced the cabinet's resignation on 26 May, and Marx was faced with what he saw as unacceptable demands from the newly strengthened German National People's Party. Given the stalemate, all of the existing ministers were reconfirmed in their posts as the second Marx cabinet on 3 June.

The following months were dominated by debate over the Dawes Plan, which set out a payment plan for Germany's war reparations. Its passage required a two-thirds majority due to the constitutional amendments necessary, meaning that both SPD and DNVP support was needed. The former favoured the plan, while the latter was deeply divided. After a contentious session, about half of the DNVP delegation voted in support, enough to secure its passage. With that major issue resolved, the cabinet negotiated for the DNVP's entry into the government, but without success. With no prospect of a stable government, the Reichstag was dissolved in October 1924 for a new election in December.
