= Karl Jarres =

German politician (1874–1951)

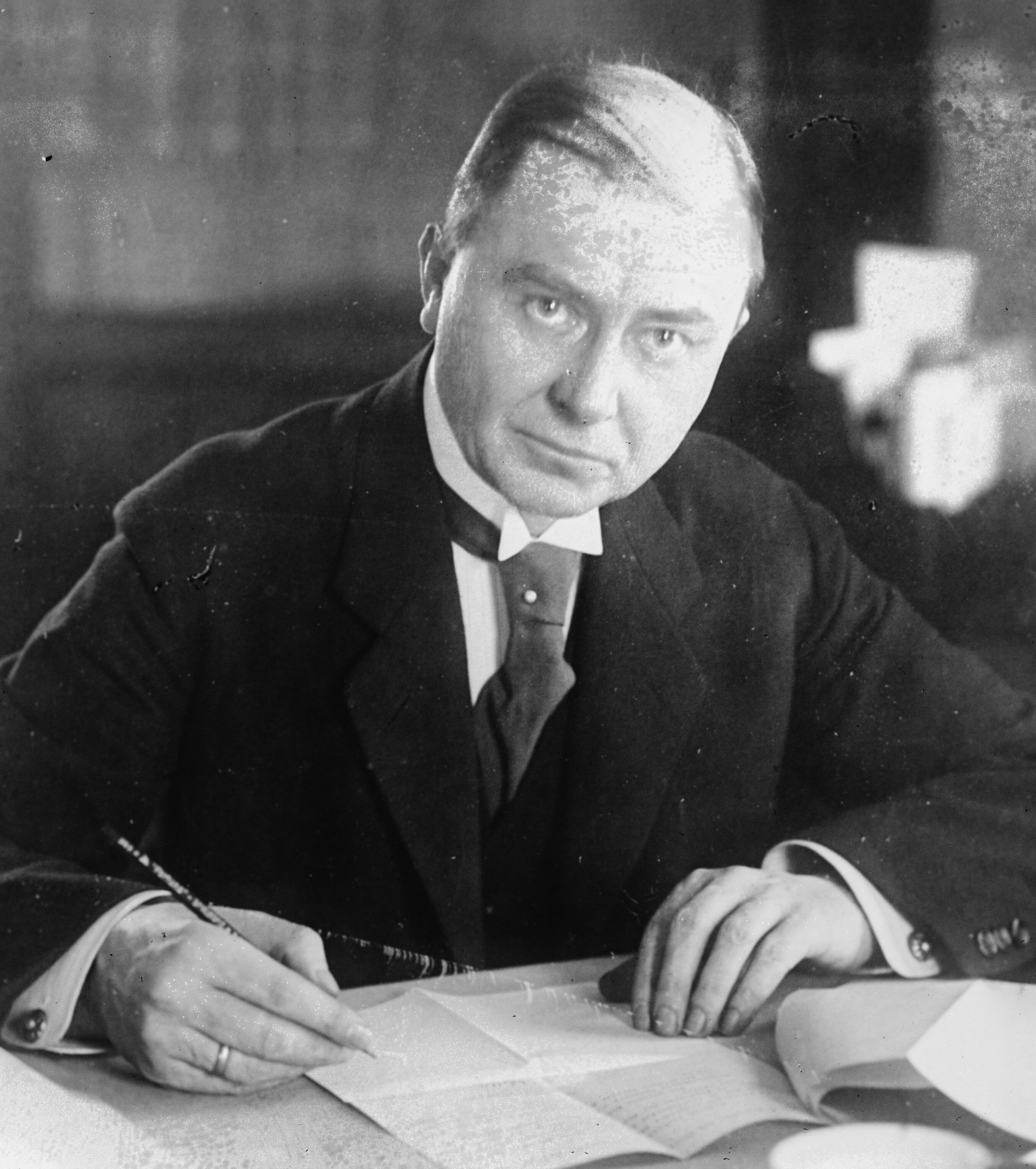
- Jarres in his office, c. 1900

Vice-Chancellor of Germany
- In office 30 November 1923 – 15 December 1924
- Chancellor: Wilhelm Marx
- Preceded by: Robert Schmidt
- Succeeded by: Oskar Hergt

Reich Minister of the Interior
- In office 11 November 1923 – 15 December 1924
- Preceded by: Wilhelm Sollmann
- Succeeded by: Martin Schiele

Personal details
- Born: 21 September 1874 Remscheid, Germany
- Died: 20 October 1951 (aged 77) Duisburg, North Rhine-Westphalia, West Germany
- Party: German People's Party (DVP)
- Other political affiliations: National Liberal Party
- Spouse: Freya Schüll (1880–1945)
- Children: Lotte (*1904), Lore (*1911)
- Education: University of Erlangen
- Occupation: Lawyer, civil servant, politician, industrialist

Karl Jarres (21 September 1874 – 20 October 1951) was a German lawyer and politician of the German People's Party (Deutsche Volkspartei, or DVP) during the Weimar Republic. From 1923 to 1924, he was the minister of the Interior and vice-chancellor of Germany. Jarres was also the long-serving mayor of Duisburg from 1914 to 1933. After the Nazis deposed him, he started a career in industry.

== Early life ==
Karl Jarres was born on 21 September 1874 in Remscheid, in the Prussian Rhine Province. His father, Rudolf Jarres (1842–1922) was a merchant. His mother was Maria Jarres (1849–1936), née Busch (daughter of merchant and Remscheid city treasurer Robert Busch). Karl studied law at London, Paris, Bonn and Berlin, and was awarded a Dr. jur. in 1897 at the University of Erlangen. After his legal clerkship, Jarres started working in municipal administration. He was Stadtassessor (1901) and then Beigeordneter (1903) at Düren. In 1907, he became Beigeordneter at Cologne. In 1910, he was elected mayor of Remscheid.

Jarres was married in Düren in 1903, to Freya (1880–1945), née Schüll, daughter of a paper manufacturer. They had two daughters.

== Political career ==
In 1911, Jarres became Oberbürgermeister (lord mayor) of Remscheid. After 1914, he was the Oberbürgermeister of Duisburg, located in the Ruhr region, a position he held until 1933. As representative for Duisburg, Jarres was a member of the Prussian upper chamber — the Herrenhaus — from 1914 to 1918.

During World War I Jarres was successful in securing food supplies for the city. During and after the Revolution he opposed the establishment of a far-left Räteherrschaft (rule by workers' and soldiers' councils), at the cost of being at times subject to physical violence. He joined the German People's Party (DVP) when it was created in 1918 (he was previously a member of the National Liberal Party) and remained a member until the DVP dissolved in 1933. However, Jarres never played a leading role in the party. From May 1921 to April 1933, Jarres was a member of the Prussian State Council and served as its Second Vice President from May 1921 to January 1924. He was also a deputy in the Provincial Landtag of Rhine Province from 1920 to 1933. He was also active in the Städtetag.

During the Occupation of the Ruhr in 1923 Jarres was deposed as mayor by the military authorities and served a deportation order by the Belgians. Since he ignored it, a military court sentenced him to two months in prison. After he was released, the Prussian and German governments appointed him Vertrauensmann for the occupied territory. He had become known nationwide for his steadfast stance against the occupation. Strongly nationalistic feeling (he was a Burschenschaft member) and a dedication to liberty made him one of the most ardent supporters of the Versackungspolitik (leaving sole responsibility for the Ruhr to the occupiers).

=== Minister in the German government ===
On 11 November 1923, Jarres followed the invitation by Gustav Stresemann and became Minister of the Interior in the second Stresemann cabinet. He kept that position under Chancellor Wilhelm Marx until December 1924. In the first and second Marx cabinets, Jarres was also Vice-Chancellor. After the Ruhr crisis was over, Jarres loyally supported the policies of Stresemann (now Foreign Minister). The second Marx cabinet resigned on 15 December 1924, and was replaced on 15 January 1925 by the first cabinet of Hans Luther.

=== Candidate for Reichspräsident of Germany ===
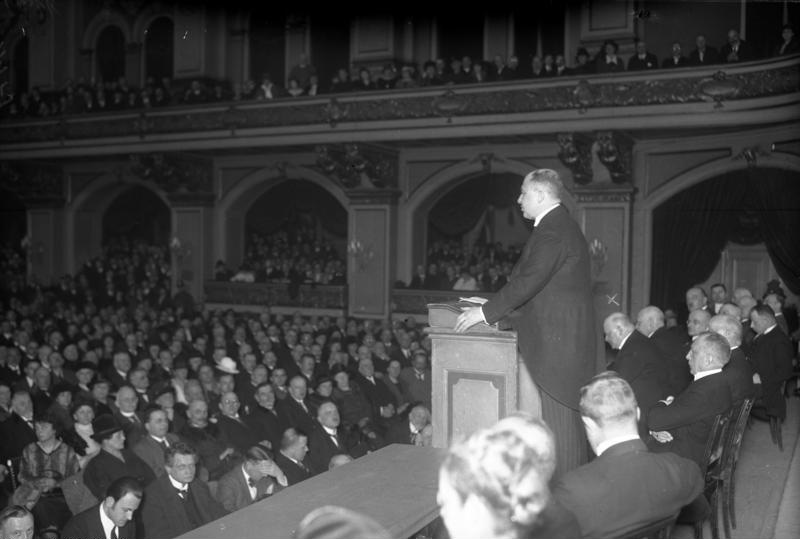
The start of the election campaign for the Reich Presidential election 1925. Karl Jarres, the candidate of the right-wing bloc, gave his first election speech on March 18, in front of thousands in the Philharmonie in Berlin. Behind him [x] is the Foreign Minister Gustav Stresemann.

Again urged by Stresemann, Jarres became the candidate of the DVP in the 1925 German Presidential election, the first direct election to the office of President of the Reich (Reichspräsident), following Friedrich Ebert's death. In the first round of the election he received the largest number of votes with over ten million and his plurality was at nearly 39%. The next major candidates were Otto Braun of the Social Democrats with nearly eight million votes (29%) and Wilhelm Marx of the Catholic Center Party with nearly four million votes (14.5%). Jarres withdrew his candidacy in the second round of voting in favor of Paul von Hindenburg, who would go on to win the closely fought second round of elections against Marx and Ernst Thälmann, the candidate of the Communist Party of Germany (KPD).

=== Lord mayor of Duisburg ===
Returning from Berlin to Duisburg in 1925, Jarres worked towards a substantial increase in the size of the city in the territorial restructuring of the Ruhr, but achieved only the merger with Hamborn in 1929 (only in 1975 did Duisburg grow to the size he had envisaged). When the Great Depression hit the city, relying mostly on heavy industry (coal and steel), was severely affected and Jarres could do little to prevent unemployment from rising.

== After 1933 ==
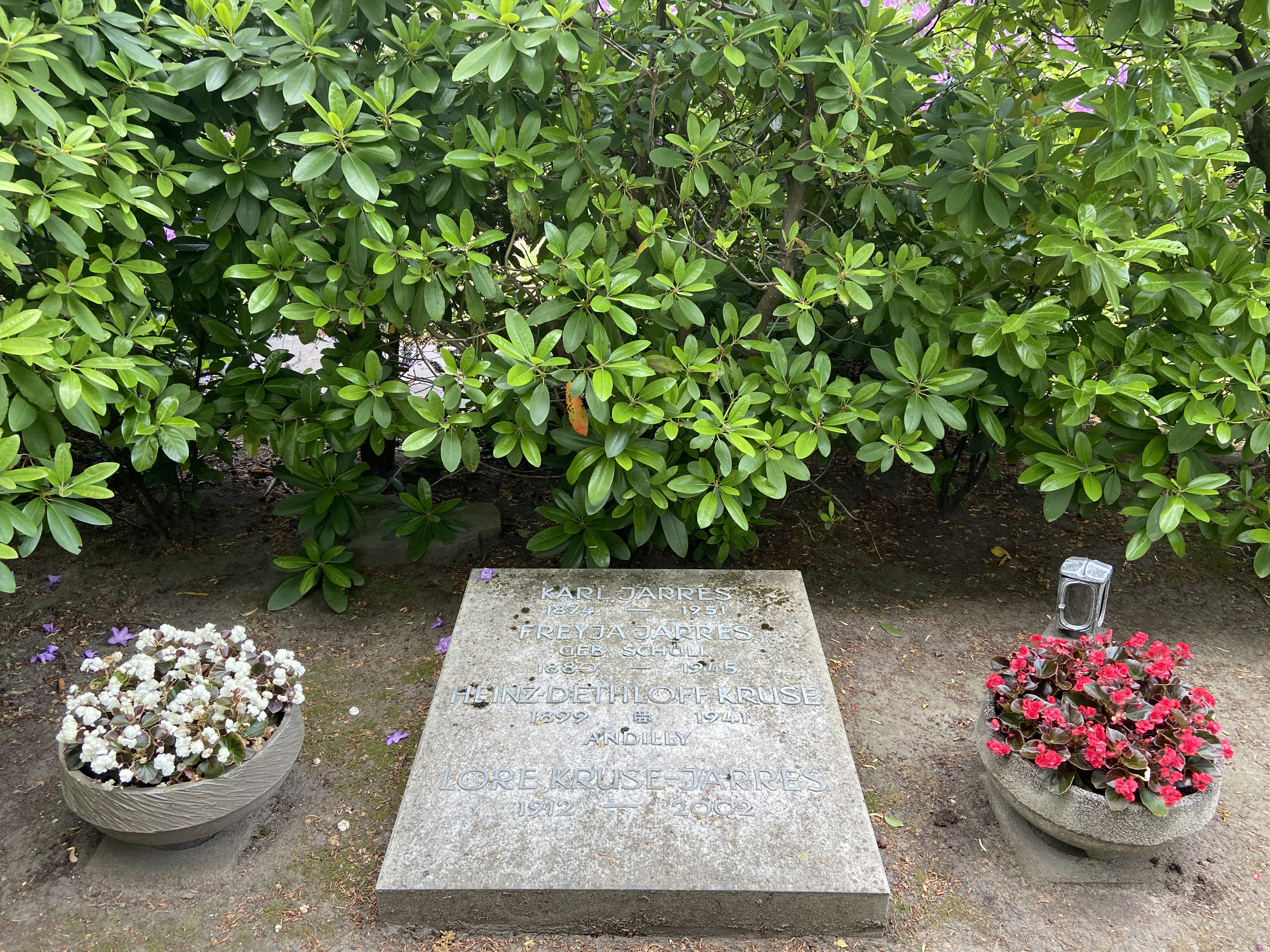
The grave of Karl Jarres at the Waldfriedhof (Woodlawn Cemetery) in Duisburg.

Reelected in 1930, Jarres was deposed as mayor by the Nazis on 5 May 1933 and in November formally retired from public life (im Ruhestand). He spent the rest of his career in private industry, as a member of the supervisory board or management board of well-known Duisburg companies such as Demag. As a leading industrialist, he was appointed by Minister President Hermann Göring to the newly reconstituted Prussian State Council on 11 July 1933 and served until the fall of the Nazi regime. After the end of the Second World War, he was instrumental in the rebuilding of the Ruhr industry. From 1942 to 1951, he was chairman of the supervisory board of Klöckner, because he was a close friend of Peter Klöckner for decades, who died in 1940.

Jarres died on 20 October 1951 at Duisburg.
