= 1916 Berlin strike =

German strike during the First World War

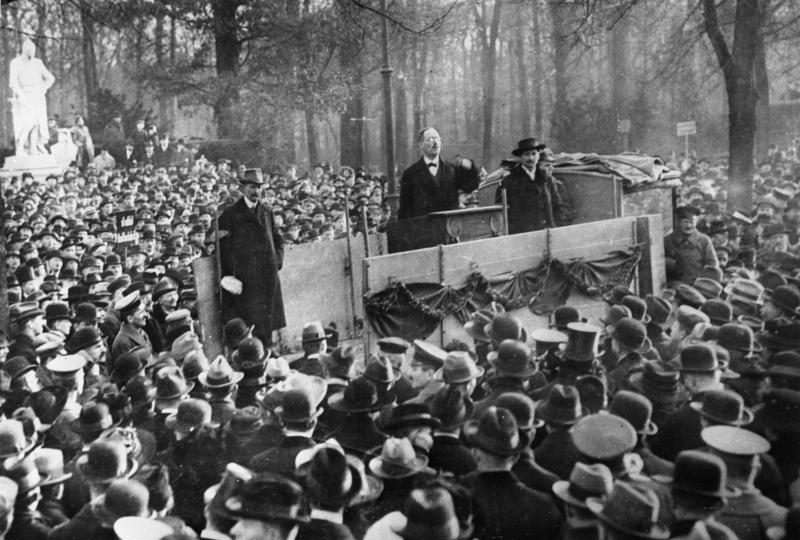
Karl Liebknecht, pictured speaking to a crowd after the end of the war in 1918

A labour strike took place in Germany on 28 June 1916. This was the first industrial action of national significance in Germany during the First World War. It was held to protest the trial of anti-war socialist campaigner Karl Liebknecht. The strike was not supported by the leadership of the German trade unions, who had agreed not to strike during the war as part of the Burgfriedenspolitik, but was organised by a number of junior officials who later became known as the Revolutionary Stewards. The strike was joined by 55,000 Berlin workers from at least 35 factories and several thousand workers from Stuttgart, Bremen, Braunschweig and Essen. Following the strike, wages fell and support for the Stewards declined. Later in the war, the Stewards organised larger strikes, in protest at the continuation of the conflict and cuts in food rations.

== Background ==
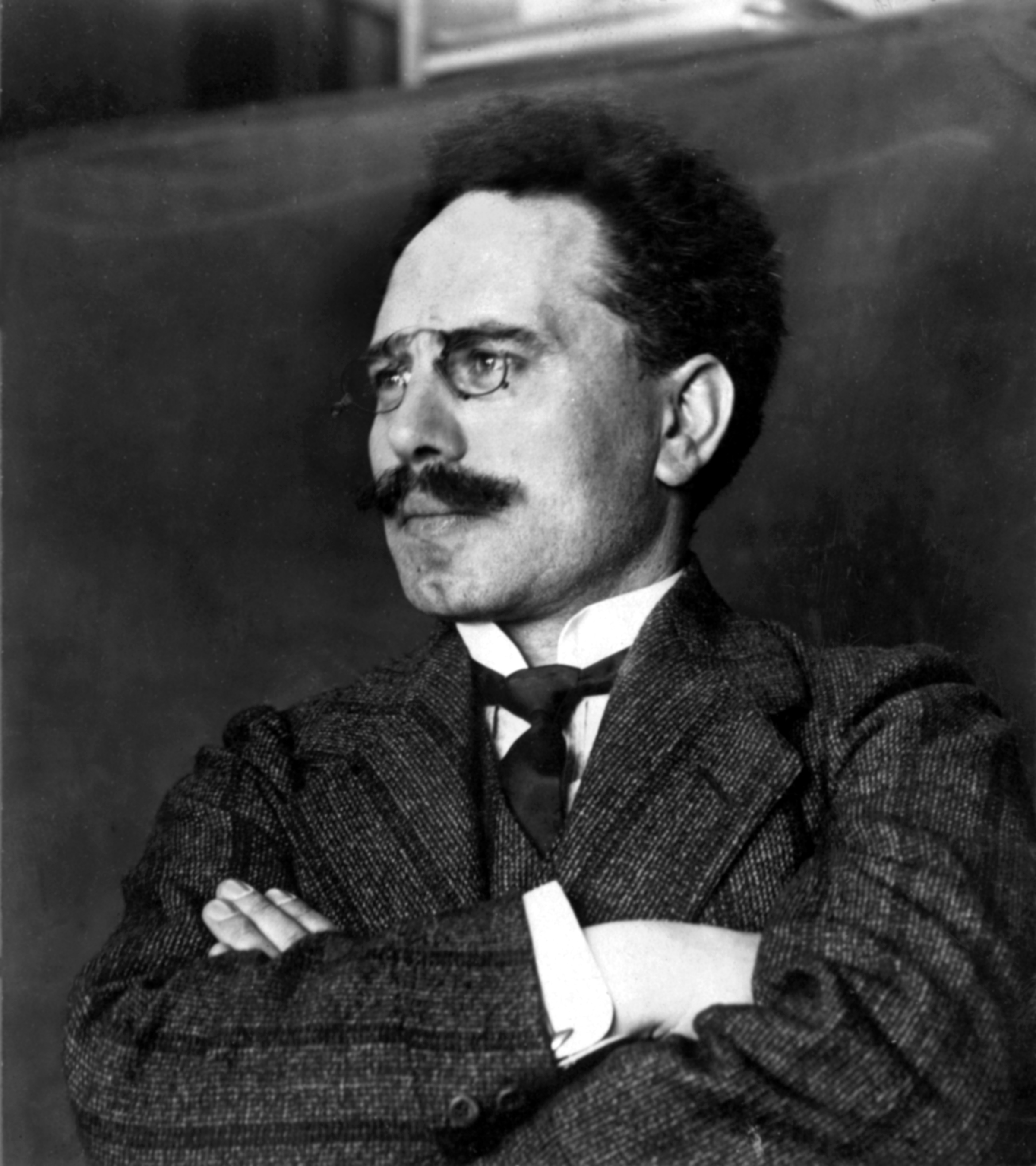
Liebknecht pictured in 1911

Germany had been fighting the First World War since 1914. Food shortages, caused by the Allied naval blockade, had led to riots in the German capital Berlin in October 1915. Some anti-war sentiment was evident by 1916. Karl Liebknecht, a socialist and anti-war campaigner associated with the Spartacus League, had held a demonstration at Potsdamer Platz in Berlin on 1 May to protest against the war and his conscription into the army as a labourer. The demonstration was broken up by police and Liebknecht imprisoned, awaiting trial. Later in May Socialist youths organised demonstrations in Hanover and Braunschweig against a compulsory war bonds scheme, which led to its abandonment. The socialist youth had diverged from the Social Democratic Party (SPD) over the party's support for the war, and distributed literature denouncing the party.

== Strike ==
The authorities provided little notice of the trial of Liebknecht, to hinder any planned demonstrations. However the Spartacus League held a demonstration in support of Liebknecht on 27 June, the first day of his trial.

At the start of the war the leaders of the German trade unions had agreed not to call any strikes for its duration. However the union members were not united in this regard. Some 50-80 shop stewards associated with the Berlin branch of the German Metal Workers' Union (DMV) favoured a strike in support of Liebknecht. The shop stewards met on the evening of 27 June at the Musiker-Festsäle dance hall to discuss a possible action. The stewards identified a large number of police informers in the audience and cancelled the meeting. A group of around 30 shop stewards withdrew to a public house on Sophienstrasse to discuss the matter. A proposal by Richard Müller for a general strike on 28 June was approved.

The strike began the following morning with a coordinated withdrawal of labour at 35 factories, including those of Borsig, AEG, Löwe and Schwartzkopff, which were then some of the largest engineering companies in the country. Word spread and other sites, including non-unionised factories, joined the strike. Some 55,000 workers in Berlin and several thousand in Stuttgart, Bremen, Braunschweig and Essen participated.

The Potsdamer Platz demonstration continued into the day of the strike. SPD and DMV leaders spoke out against the strikes and handed out anti-strike leaflets to workers. At a meeting held ostensibly to encourage the strikers back to work socialist activist Sepp Oerter spoke angrily against the government and the war. The German authorities carried out a large number of house searches in response to the strike and increased the censorship of mail. Dozens of striking workers and union leaders were drafted into the army, including Müller, though he was released three months later.

Liebknecht was tried and convicted. The unions did not carry out further strikes when he appeared in court again for his appeals and sentencing, perhaps because of the unexpectedly harsh measures meted out by the authorities in response to the first strike.

== Legacy ==
The strike was the first industrial action of national significance in Germany during the war and the socialist youth movement regarded it as the most important demonstration of the war years. The strike demonstrated the potential that the working class had to influence the war and marked the first time that unions had moved beyond industrial disputes into wider political matters. The strike led to the harsher treatment of Liebknecht by the authorities, on 23 August his sentence, originally for 2 years and 6 months of imprisonment with hard labour, was increased to four years and one month.

Wages fell after the strike which the unions blamed on the industrial action, this caused workers to support the union leadership and oppose further strike action. A strike planned for August 1916 by the Spartacus League was not supported and had little impact. The union officials involved in the June 1916 strike became known as the Revolutionary Stewards. They played a key role in the organisation of a much larger strike in April 1917, in protest at a 25% cut in the bread ration. This strike mobilised 200–300,000 men and women in Berlin, Braunschweig, Dresden, Halle, Hanover and Magdeburg and had more of an anti-war theme than the 1916 strike. In the same month a new Independent Social Democratic Party of Germany was founded, becoming an umbrella organisation for anti-war movements in the country. The Revolutionary Stewards also organised the January 1918 strike protesting cuts in the flour ration and which openly called for peace, without German territorial expansion.
