= German revolution of 1918–1919 =

Overthrow of the German Empire

German revolution
- Part of the Revolutions of 1917–1923 and Political violence in Germany (1918–1933)
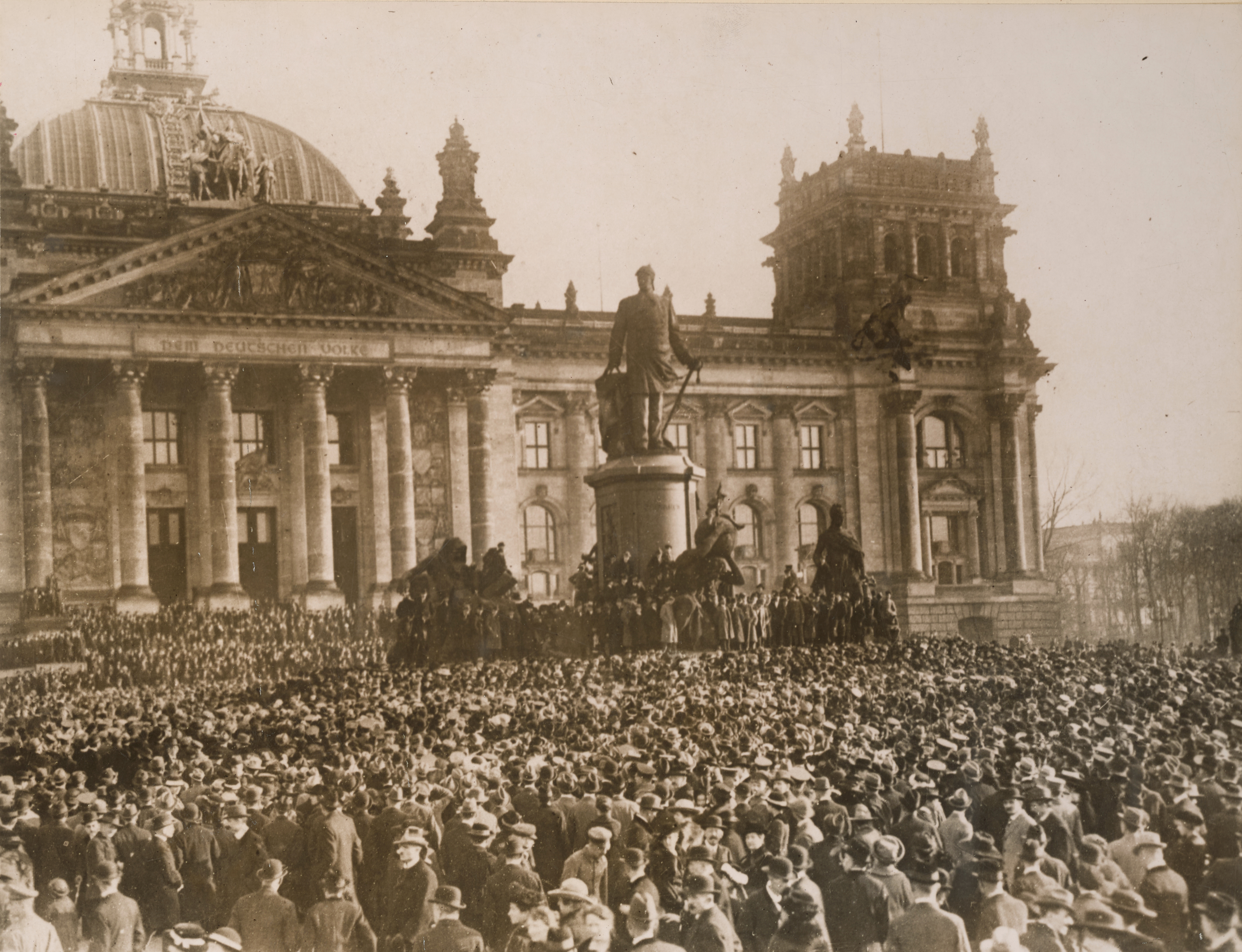
- Proclamation of the republic by Philipp Scheidemann at the Reichstag building in Berlin, 9 November 1918
Date	First stage: 29 October – 9 November 1918 (1 week and 4 days); Second stage: 10 November 1918 – 11 August 1919 (9 months and 1 week)
Location	Germany
Result	Weimar Republic victory

Belligerents
Before November 9th 1918: German Empire: Imperial Army; After November 9th 1918: Weimar Republic: Freikorps; Reichswehr; Der Stahlhelm; SPD	Revolutionaries: SPD (until 9 Nov. 1918); USPD (from 9 Nov. 1918); Spartacus League; KPD (from 30 Dec. 1918); IKD; Revolutionary Stewards; FVdG; Soviet Republics: People's State of Bavaria; Bavarian Soviet Republic; Bremen Soviet Republic; Würzburg Soviet Republic; Alsace–Lorraine Soviet Republic; Supported by: Russian SFSR

Commanders and leaders
Before November 9th 1918: (German Empire) Wilhelm II; (German Empire) Max of Baden; (German Empire) Ludwig III of Bavaria; (German Empire) Erich Ludendorff; (German Empire) Paul von Hindenburg; (German Empire) Wilhelm Groener; (German Empire) Franz von Hipper; (German Empire) Reinhard Scheer; After November 9th 1918: (Weimar Republic) Friedrich Ebert; (Weimar Republic) Gustav Noske; (Weimar Republic) Philipp Scheidemann; (Weimar Republic) Otto Wels; (Weimar Republic) Waldemar Pabst; (Weimar Republic) Franz Seldte; (Weimar Republic) Matthias Erzberger; (Weimar Republic) Hugo Preuß; (Weimar Republic) Eugen Schiffer	Rosa Luxemburg X Karl Liebknecht X Kurt Eisner X Clara Zetkin; Franz Mehring; Leo Jogiches X Wilhelm Pieck; Ernst Toller (surrendered); Erich Mühsam (surrendered); Richard Müller; Emil Barth; Gustav Landauer X Eugen Leviné (executed); Max Levien; Rudolf Egelhofer X Karl Radek; Johann Knief; Emil Eichhorn

The German revolution of 1918–1919, also known as the November Revolution (German: Novemberrevolution), brought down the German Empire at the end of World War I and set the stage for the establishment of the Weimar Republic. The revolution was sparked by the hardships suffered by the German people during the war, the economic and psychological impacts of the Empire's defeat, and the social tensions between the general populace and the aristocratic, military and bourgeois elite. It quickly and almost bloodlessly brought down the Empire by 9 November 1918, then in its second and more violent stage, the supporters of a parliamentary republic defeated those who wanted to create a soviet-style council republic.

The revolution began on 29 October 1918 when sailors at Kiel mutinied against orders to sail out against the British fleet. They established a revolutionary workers' and soldiers' council and in early November spread the revolt across Germany. Councils took power from the existing military, royal and civil authorities with little resistance or bloodshed. The revolution reached Berlin on 9 November, a republic was proclaimed, and Emperor Wilhelm II fled to Holland the next day.

On 10 November, the Council of the People's Deputies was formed as a provisional government by members of Germany's two main socialist parties. Under the leadership of Friedrich Ebert, it kept most of the imperial officer corps, administration and judiciary in place so that it could use their expertise to address the crises of the moment.

Those on the left wing of the revolution wanted to nationalise key industries, democratise the military and set up a council republic, but the moderates had control of most of the workers' and soldiers' councils and blocked any substantial movement towards their goals. The split between the moderate and radical socialists erupted into violence in the last days of 1918. The Spartacist uprising in January 1919 failed in its attempt to create a dictatorship of the proletariat and led to the murders of Rosa Luxemburg and Karl Liebknecht by members of the Freikorps. Into the spring, there were additional violently suppressed efforts to push the revolution further in the direction of a council republic, as well as short-lived local soviet republics, notably in Bavaria, Bremen and Würzburg.

The revolution's end date is generally given as 11 August 1919, the day the Weimar Constitution was adopted, but in many ways the revolution remained incomplete. It failed to resolve the fracture in the Left between moderate socialists and communists, while anti-democratic voices from the imperial government remained in positions of power. The Weimar Republic was from its birth under great pressure from both those on the Left and the Right who sought to undermine and replace it. In the end, the far Right was successful, and the Weimar Republic came to an end with the ascent of Hitler and the National Socialist Party.

== Background events ==
=== World War I ===
World War I brought out serious weaknesses in the German Empire's social and political structures. When hostilities started in 1914, the German government portrayed the war as defensive, and all of Germany's political parties, including the left-wing Social Democratic Party (SPD), threw their support behind it with a pledge of intra-party peace (Burgfriedenspolitik). The "Spirit of 1914", the initial enthusiasm for the war that affected many but by no means all Germans, waned as the expected quick victory failed to materialize. The Allied blockade of Germany, which lasted from 1914 to 1919, cut off imported foodstuffs and led to widespread hunger as early as the Turnip Winter of 1916/17. Profiteering skyrocketed with the emergence of a large black market, inflation rose rapidly and class antagonisms increased. The growing discontent affected the bourgeoisie as well as workers, and the Pan-Germans and others on the Right began to blame Jews for the problems.

The Hindenburg Programme, an armaments and economic policy begun in late 1916 by the Supreme Army Command (OHL) in order to increase munitions output, was seen by the Left as worker exploitation despite some important concessions to them. Significant labour strikes, many centred in the armaments industry, took place beginning in 1916 and culminated in the huge January 1918 strike. Outwardly a demand for better food rations, it was also a mass worker protest against the war. In a sign of the growing social divide, the prominent Lutheran pastor Bruno Doehring anticipated the stab-in-the-back myth when he accused the January strikers of falling on the frontline soldiers from behind. The German Fatherland Party, a populist pro-victory movement founded in September 1917, claimed a membership of over one million by July 1918. After Russia pulled out of the war, the Fatherland Party fed an "annexationist fever" for lands in the east among the conservative elite.

Political weaknesses in the German Empire emerged along with the war's social divisions. Under the Burgfriede, the Reichstag met only irregularly and then usually to do little more than approve additional war funding. Emperor Wilhelm II had not played a major role in German politics since the Daily Telegraph Affair in 1908, yet he remained technically the supreme commander of the military. It was able to step in to fill political voids because the imperial constitution did not define or put limits on its power. In 1916 generals Paul von Hindenburg and Erich Ludendorff used their positions in the OHL to become in effect an ersatz monarchy. In July 1917 they were able to force out long-time Chancellor Theobald von Bethmann Hollweg, who saw the necessity for political reforms in light of the changed domestic situation, and replace him with a conservative of their own choice, Georg Michaelis. Less than a week later, the Reichstag passed a resolution calling for a negotiated peace without annexations, but it was rejected by the military and the conservative parties and ignored by the Allies.

The war also led to a split in the SPD, the largest political party in Germany, which had taken 35% of the national vote and 110 seats in the last imperial Reichstag elected in 1912. Because of increasing intra-party conflicts centering around the members who opposed the war, party leadership under Friedrich Ebert expelled them from the party in January 1917. The Spartacists were among the expellees who founded the anti-war Independent Social Democratic Party (USPD) under the leadership of Hugo Haase on 6 April 1917. After that point, the SPD was officially renamed the Majority Social Democratic Party of Germany (MSPD), although it was still generally referred to as the SPD. The USPD called for an immediate end to the war and a further democratisation of Germany.

=== End of the war ===
==== Impact of the Russian Revolution ====
In April 1917, the German government facilitated Vladimir Lenin's return to Russia from his exile in Switzerland in the hope that he would weaken the tsarist regime and its conduct of the war. After the 1917 October Revolution that put Lenin and the Bolsheviks in power, many in both Russia and Germany expected that Soviet Russia would attempt to foment a communist revolution in Germany. For Germany's far left, it provided hope for its own success, but for the moderate socialists and the middle and upper classes, it was a source of fear that the kind of bloody civil war that was occurring in Russia could also break out in Germany.

The moderate SPD leadership consequently shifted away from the party's official stance as revolutionary socialists. Otto Braun clarified the SPD's position in an article titled "The Bolsheviks and Us" (Die Bolschewiki und Wir) in the party newspaper Vorwärts of 15 February 1918: "Socialism cannot be erected on bayonets and machine guns. If it is to last, it must be realised with democratic means. ... Therefore we must draw a thick, visible dividing line between ourselves and the Bolsheviks."

On 3 March 1918, the newly established Soviet government signed the Treaty of Brest-Litovsk with Germany to end Russia's involvement in the war. The terms of the treaty, under which Russia lost 34% of its population, 54% of its industrial land, 89% of its coalfields and 26% of its railways, were arguably harsher for the Russians than the later Treaty of Versailles would be for the Germans. Brest-Litovsk revived the German people's hopes for a final victory in the West, but social tensions increased when the foodstuffs expected from the eastern regions did not arrive, and the shock of the final defeat that came six months later was that much worse because of the raised expectations.

==== Military collapse ====
Following the Allied breakthrough at the Battle of Amiens on 8 August 1918 – Ludendorff's "black day of the German Army" – military morale began to deteriorate rapidly. Troops increasingly refused to obey orders, deserted and voluntarily surrendered to the enemy. Ludendorff later wrote in his war memoirs: "Retreating troops, passing by a fresh division that was fighting bravely, called out: 'Strike breakers!' and 'You're dragging out the war!'" The collapse of military morale was echoed in the civilian population. A Reichstag representative from Baden reported in late September that many southern Germans felt "enormous bitterness against Prussia; not against the Prussian people but against the Junkers and the military caste. The dominant feeling among us is that Prussia must fail, and if Prussia does not fail, Germany will fail because of Prussia."

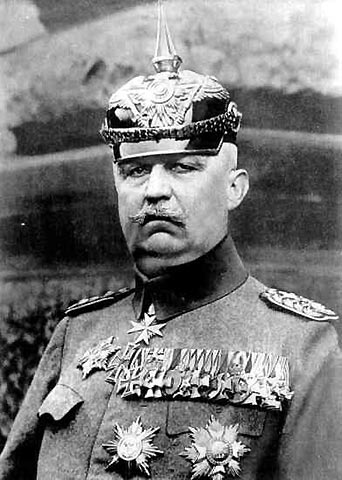
Erich Ludendorff in 1918. His calculated shifting of responsibility for the war's loss from the army to the civilian government gave rise to the stab-in-the-back myth.

On 29 September 1918, the Supreme Army Command informed Emperor Wilhelm II and Chancellor Georg von Hertling that the military situation was hopeless in the face of the enemy's overwhelming advantage in manpower and equipment. General Ludendorff said that a request for an immediate ceasefire should be sent to the Entente powers. In hopes of more favourable peace terms, he also recommended accepting American president Woodrow Wilson's demand that the imperial government be democratised. His aim was to protect the reputation of the Imperial Army by placing the responsibility for the capitulation and its consequences at the feet of the democratic parties and the Reichstag. In a veiled reference to the workers who had struck the armaments plants, the Social Democrats who had helped pass the Reichstag Peace Resolution and the radical Spartacists who wanted a dictatorship of the proletariat, he said to his staff officers on 1 October:

I have asked His Majesty to bring into the government those circles to whom we mainly owe it that we have come this far. ... Let them now make the peace that must be made. They should eat the soup they have served up to us!

His statement marked the birth of the "stab-in-the-back myth", according to which revolutionary socialists and republican politicians had betrayed the undefeated army and turned an almost certain victory into a defeat.

==== Political response ====
Although shocked by Ludendorff's report and the news of the certain defeat, the majority parties in the Reichstag, most notably the SPD, were willing to take on the responsibility of government. Chancellor Hertling objected to introducing a parliamentary system and resigned. Emperor Wilhelm II then appointed Prince Max of Baden as the new imperial chancellor on 3 October. The Prince was considered a liberal and at the same time was a representative of the royal family. Most of the men in his cabinet were independents, but there were also two members of the SPD. The following day, the new government offered the Allies the truce that Ludendorff had insisted on, and on the 5th the German public was informed of the dismal situation that it faced. Even up to that late point, government propaganda and the press had led the people to believe that the war would still be won. The shock of the impending defeat caused a "paralytic bitterness and deep resignation" which eased the way for those who wanted an immediate ceasefire.

During October, President Wilson responded to the request for a truce with three diplomatic notes. As a precondition for negotiations, he demanded the retreat of Germany from all occupied territories, the cessation of submarine activities and (implicitly) the Emperor's abdication. Following the third note of 24 October, which emphasised the danger to international peace inherent in the power of the "King of Prussia" (Wilhelm II) and the "military authorities of the Empire", General Ludendorff resigned and was replaced as First General Quartermaster by General Wilhelm Groener.

On 28 October, the Reichstag passed constitutional reforms that changed Germany into a parliamentary monarchy. The chancellor and his ministers were made dependent on the confidence of the parliamentary majority rather than the emperor, and peace treaties and declarations of war required the Reichstag's approval. Because the chancellor was also responsible for the emperor's acts under the constitution, the emperor's military right of command (Kommandogewalt) became the chancellor's responsibility and thus subject to parliamentary control. As far as the Social Democrats were concerned, the October Constitution met all the party's important constitutional objectives. Ebert regarded the formation of the Baden government as the birthday of German democracy. Since the Emperor had voluntarily ceded power, he considered a revolution unnecessary.

The October constitutional reform was not a thorough break with the existing state and its legal order. It had been conceived of as a "revolution from above" that was the only means of preventing a "revolution from below". The reforms on paper did not convince angry and exhausted workers and soldiers. The population as a whole saw the Emperor as responsible for the suffering and outcome of the war, and calls for his abdication grew.

=== Overview of causes ===
Sociologist Max Weber attributed the quick collapse of the Empire in the revolution to the "hollowing out" of Germany's traditional standards during the war. The expansion of black markets revealed the economic and monetary failures of the Wilhelmine system. Historian Eberhard Kolb saw a vast "paralysis of the will" in the state's power to preserve order and a corresponding desire among the people for a more complete transformation of the political and social order. The German populace was already war weary when the request for a ceasefire came like a thunderbolt. From that point, they wanted only peace. Wilson's Fourteen Points fed the belief that Germany would get a just peace if it democratised, and so the desire for peace led to demands for democracy. In the words of historian Heinrich August Winkler: "The revolution from below broke out because the revolution from above, the October regime-change, had failed. The failure was the result of obstruction by the military. The obstruction ... made it impossible to preserve the institution of monarchy. Collapse, obstruction, and revolution led to the proclamation of the German Republic on 9 November 1918."

Historian Hans Mommsen wrote of the causes of the revolution:

The popular movement that swept away the regime in the first days of November 1918 was directed against the usurped authority of the system's military supporters and the social injustice upon which it was founded. This protest was elemental but did not assume the character of unbridled violence and outrageous excesses. The end of the war seemed to signal the beginning of a new era, one that would do away with class justice and mindless obedience, with arbitrariness and social inequality.

== Revolution, first stage: fall of the Empire ==
=== Sailors' revolt ===
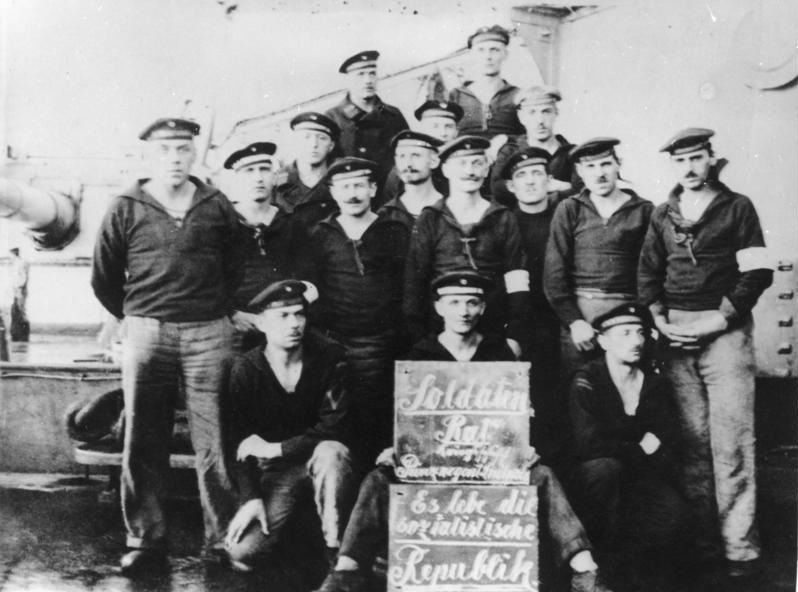
Kiel mutiny: the soldiers' council of the battleship Prinzregent Luitpold. The sign reads in part "Long live the socialist republic."

The German revolution was triggered by a sailors' mutiny centered on the North Sea ports of Kiel and Wilhelmshaven in late October 1918. While the war-weary troops and general population of Germany awaited the end of the war, the Imperial Naval Command in Kiel under Admiral Franz von Hipper and Admiral Reinhard Scheer planned without authorization to dispatch the Imperial Fleet for a last battle against the British Royal Navy in the southern North Sea.

The naval order of 24 October 1918 and the preparations to sail triggered a mutiny among the sailors involved. They had no intention of risking their lives so close to the end of the war and were convinced that the credibility of the new government, engaged as it was in seeking an armistice with the Entente, would be compromised by a naval attack at such a crucial point in the negotiations.

The mutiny began on a small number of ships anchored off Wilhelmshaven. Faced with the sailors' disobedience, naval command called off the offensive during the night of 29–30 October, arrested several hundred of the mutineers and had the ships return to port. On 3 November, police and soldiers confronted a protest march by the sailors towards the prison in Kiel where the mutineers were being held. The soldiers opened fire and killed at least nine protestors. The following day, workers in Kiel declared a general strike in support of the protest, and sailors from the barracks at Wik, north of Kiel, joined the march, as did many of the soldiers sent to help control the protests.

Faced with the rapidly escalating situation, Admiral Wilhelm Souchon, the naval commander in Kiel, released the imprisoned sailors and asked the protestors to send a delegation to meet with him and two representatives of the Baden government who had arrived from Berlin. The sailors had a list of fourteen demands, including less harsh military punishment and full freedom of speech and the press in the Empire. One of the representatives from the Reich government, Gustav Noske of the Majority Social Democrats (SPD), calmed the immediate situation with a promise of amnesty, but by then Kiel was already in the hands of a workers' and soldiers' council, and groups of sailors had gone to nearby cities to spread the uprising. Within days the revolution had encompassed the western part of Germany.

=== Spread of the revolution ===
By 7 November, the revolution had taken control in all large coastal cities – Lübeck, Bremen, Hamburg – and spread to Braunschweig, Cologne and as far south as Munich. There, Kurt Eisner of the radical Independent Social Democrats (USPD) was elected president of the Bavarian Workers', Peasants' and Soldiers' Council, and on 8 November he proclaimed the People's State of Bavaria. King Ludwig III and his family fled Munich for Austria, where in the 12 November Anif declaration he relieved all civil servants and military personnel from their oath of loyalty to him, effectively abdicating the Wittlesbach throne. By the end of the month, the dynastic rulers of all the other German states had abdicated without bloodshed.

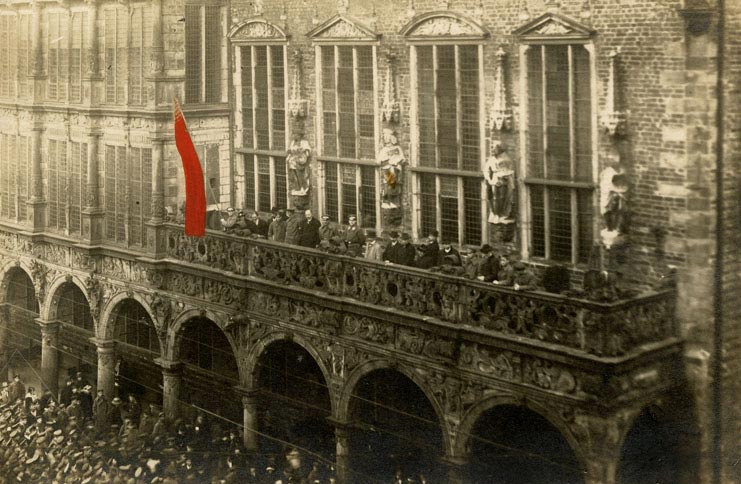
Proclamation of the Bremen Soviet Republic outside the city hall on 15 November 1918

There was little to no resistance to the establishment of the councils. Soldiers by simple acclamation often elected their most respected comrades; workers generally chose members of the local executive committees of the SPD or USPD. With the support of local citizens, they freed political prisoners and occupied city halls, military facilities and train stations. The military authorities surrendered or fled, and civic officials accepted that they were under the control of the councils rather than the military and carried on with their work. Little changed in the factories except for the removal of the military discipline that had prevailed during the war. Private property was not touched. The sociologist Max Weber was part of the workers' council of Heidelberg and was pleasantly surprised that most members were moderate German liberals. The councils took over the distribution of food, the police force and the accommodation and provisions of the front-line soldiers who were gradually returning home.

The workers' and soldiers' councils were made up almost entirely of SPD and USPD members. Their program called for an end to the war and to the authoritarian monarchical state. Apart from the dynastic families, they deprived only the military commands of their power and privilege. There were hardly any confiscations of property or occupations of factories. The duties of the imperial civilian administration and office holders such as police, municipal administrations and courts were not curtailed or interfered with. In order to create an executive committed to the revolution and to the future of the new government, the councils for the moment left government officials in place and took over only their supervision from the military commands that had been put in place during the war.

Notably, revolutionary sentiment did not affect the eastern parts of Germany to any considerable extent. Workers' and soldiers' councils did form in some of the larger cities such as at Breslau, Görlitz und Glogau in Silesia and Königsberg in East Prussia.

=== Reaction in Berlin ===
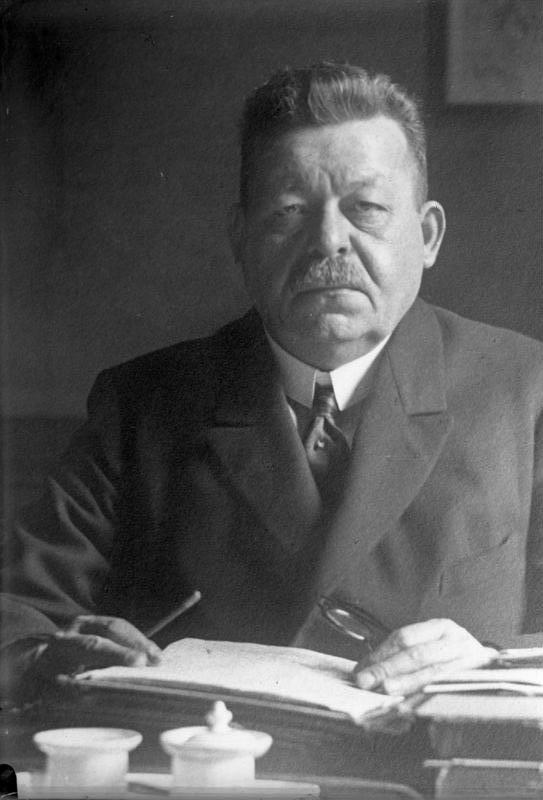
Friedrich Ebert, who led the Majority Social Democrats through the revolution

Friedrich Ebert, the leader of the SPD, agreed with the chancellor, Prince Max of Baden, that a social revolution had to be prevented and order upheld at all costs. In the restructuring of the state, Ebert wanted to win over the middle-class parties that had cooperated with the SPD in the Reichstag in 1917 as well as the old elites of the German Empire. He wanted to avoid the spectre of radicalisation of the revolution along Russian lines and was also worried that the precarious food supply situation could break down, leading to the takeover of the administration by inexperienced revolutionaries. He was certain that the SPD would be able to implement its reform plans in the future due to its parliamentary majorities.

Ebert did his best to act in agreement with the old powers and intended to save the monarchy. In hopes that the Emperor's departure and the establishment of a regency would save the constitutional monarchy that had been established on 28 October, the SPD called for Wilhelm's abdication on 7 November. According to notes taken by Prince Max of Baden, Ebert told him, "If the Emperor does not abdicate, the social revolution is unavoidable. But I do not want it, indeed I hate it like sin."

Wilhelm II, still at his headquarters in Spa, was considering returning to Germany at the head of the army to quell any unrest in Berlin. Even when General Groener told him that the army no longer supported him, he did not abdicate. The Chancellor planned to travel to Spa to convince Wilhelm personally of the necessity, but his plans were overtaken by the rapidly deteriorating situation in Berlin.

By this time, Wilhelm accepted that he would have to give up his imperial crown but still believed he could remain king of Prussia. This was not possible under the imperial constitution, which defined the empire as a confederation under the permanent presidency of Prussia. The imperial crown was thus tied to the Prussian crown, and Wilhelm could not renounce one throne without renouncing the other.

=== Abdication and proclamations of a republic ===
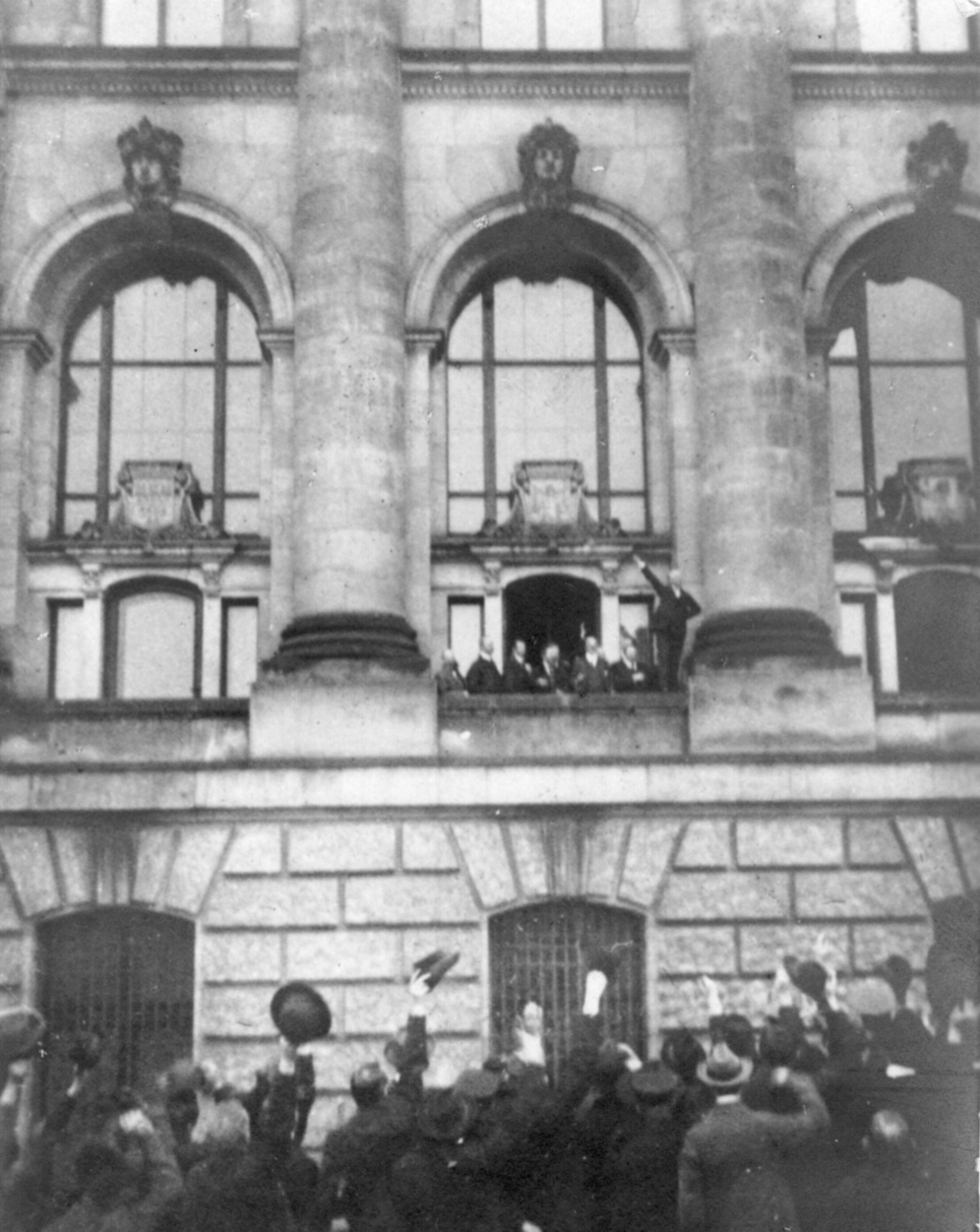
Philipp Scheidemann at a window of the Reichstag building proclaiming a republic

On 9 November, Chancellor von Baden telephoned the Emperor and tried to persuade him to give up the throne to a regent who would then constitutionally appoint Ebert as chancellor. He did so rather than meet the Emperor in person at Spa. After his efforts failed, Baden, without authorization, issued a proclamation that the Emperor and the Crown Prince had renounced the German and Prussian thrones. Immediately thereafter, following a short meeting of the cabinet, the Prince resigned and transferred the chancellorship to Friedrich Ebert, a move that was not allowed under the constitution. Ebert quickly released a statement announcing the formation of a new "people's government" whose immediate tasks were to end the war as quickly as possible and to ensure a sufficient supply of food for the German people, who were still suffering under the impact of the Allied blockade. The statement ended with "Leave the streets! Keep order and peace!"

The premature news of the abdication came too late to make any impression on the demonstrators who had filled the streets of Berlin. Nobody heeded the public appeals. While having lunch in the Reichstag building, the SPD deputy chairman Philipp Scheidemann learned that Karl Liebknecht of the Spartacus League planned to proclaim a socialist republic. Scheidemann did not want to leave the initiative to the Spartacists and stepped to a window of the Reichstag building where he proclaimed a republic before the mass of demonstrators gathered there. Ebert, who believed that the decision about the future form of the government of Germany belonged to a national assembly of the people's democratically elected representatives, stormed angrily at Scheidemann for his spontaneous decision to announce a republic. A few hours later, in the Berlin Lustgarten, Liebknecht proclaimed a socialist republic, which he reaffirmed from a balcony of the Berlin Palace to an assembled crowd at around 4 pm.

Facing an untenable situation, Wilhelm left for exile in the Netherlands the following day, effectively ending 400 years of Hohenzollern rule over Prussia and Germany. It was not until 28 November that he issued a formal statement of abdication. Finally acknowledging he had lost both of his crowns for good, he permanently renounced "the rights to the Crown of Prussia and the associated rights to the German Imperial Crown".

== Revolution, second stage: defeat of the radical Left ==
Once the monarchy had collapsed under the pressure of the workers' and soldiers' councils, it was up to the leadership of the socialist parties in Berlin to quickly establish the new order and address the many critical problems the defeated nation faced. From the beginning, the moderates of the SPD held the leading position. They had the broadest support from the working class and at the least grudging backing of the imperial bureaucracy, most of which remained in place. The Council of the People's Deputies immediately removed some of the Empire's harsh restrictions, such as on freedom of expression. They promised an eight-hour workday and elections that would give women the right to vote for the first time.

However, Ebert showed himself willing to use the military and Freikorps against opposing members of the socialist Left. This quickly led to fractures between the SPD and USPD and then to street battles with the Spartacists and communists.

=== The councils ===
==== Establishment, pact with the military and armistice ====
Ebert wanted to take the sting out of the revolutionary mood and to meet the demands of the 9 November demonstrators for the unity of the labour parties. He offered the USPD equal participation in the government and was ready to accept Karl Liebknecht as a minister. The USPD, at Liebknecht's insistence, demanded that elected representatives of the unions and soldiers have full executive, legislative and judicial control. The SPD refused, and negotiations got no further that day.

Around 8 pm, a group of 100 Revolutionary Stewards from the larger Berlin factories occupied the Reichstag. Led by their spokesmen Richard Müller and Emil Barth, they formed a revolutionary parliament. Most of the participating stewards had been leaders during the strikes earlier in the year. They did not trust the SPD leadership and had planned a coup for 11 November independently of the sailors' revolt, but were unprepared for the revolutionary events since Kiel. In order to take the initiative from Ebert, they decided to announce elections for the following day, a Sunday. Every Berlin factory was to elect workers' councils and every regiment soldiers' councils that were then to elect a revolutionary government from members of the two labour parties (SPD and USPD) in the evening. The government would be empowered to execute the resolutions of the revolutionary parliament, since they intended to replace Ebert's function as chancellor.

On the evening of the ninth, the SPD leadership learned of the plans for the elections and the councils' meeting. Since they could not be prevented, Otto Wels used the party apparatus to influence the voting in the soldiers' councils and won most of them over to the SPD. By morning it was clear that the SPD would have the majority of the delegates on its side at the councils' meeting that evening.

USPD chairman Hugo Haase returned from Kiel the morning of 10 November and was able to broker a compromise in the negotiations with the SPD about the new government. The revolutionary government, to be called the Council of the People's Deputies (Rat der Volksbeauftragten) at the USPD's insistence, gave the USPD much of what it wanted. The council was to be made up of three representatives of the SPD (Ebert, Scheidemann and Otto Landsberg) and three from the USPD (Haase, Wilhelm Dittmann and Emil Barth). The workers' and soldiers' councils were to be given political power – not full executive, legislative and judicial control – and a national assembly would be discussed only "after a consolidation of the conditions created by the revolution".

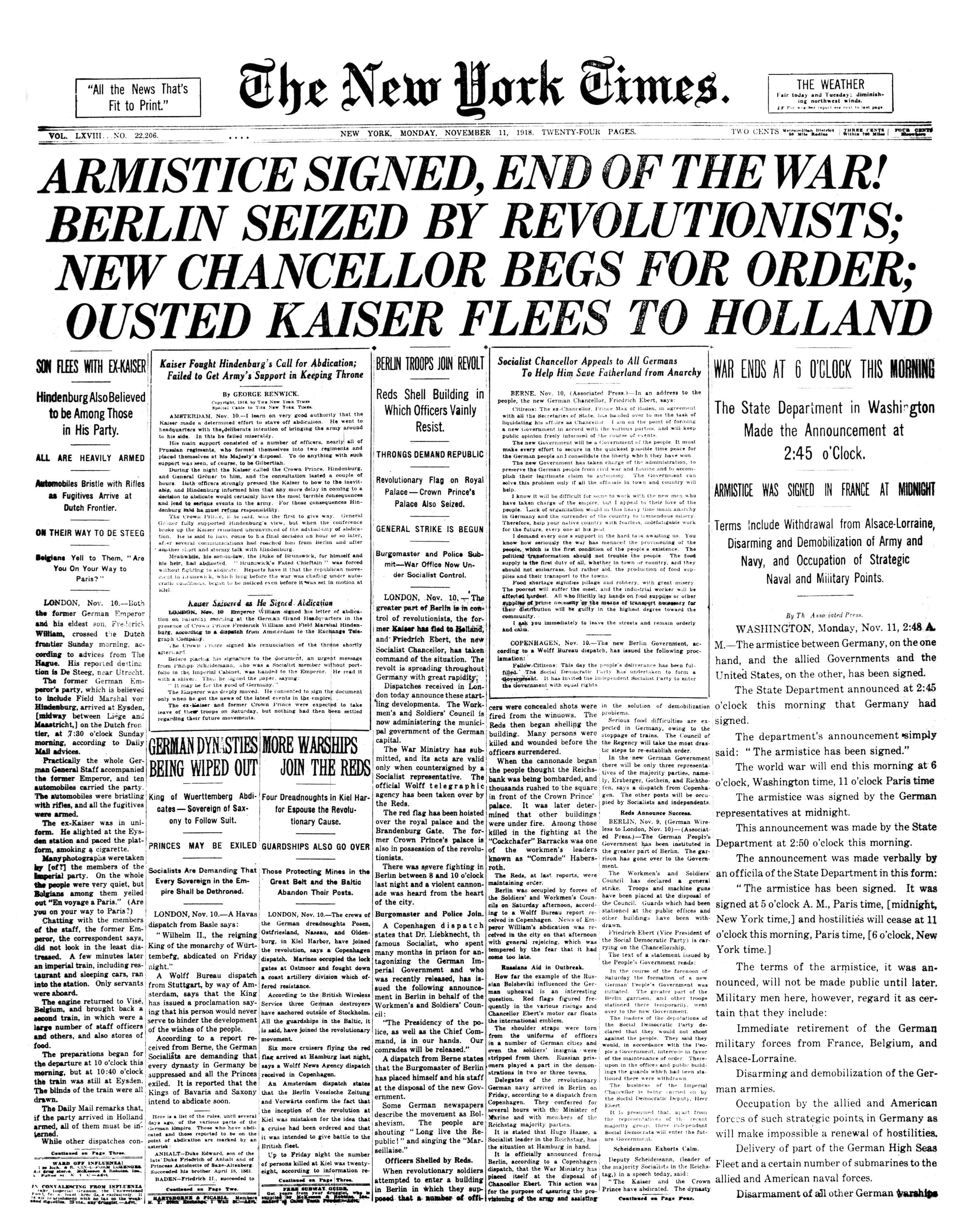
"Berlin seized by revolutionists": The New York Times on Armistice Day, 11 November 1918

In the assembly of the newly elected councils that convened in the afternoon at the Circus Busch, almost all of the soldiers' councils and a large part of the workers' representatives stood on the side of the SPD. After it ratified the membership of the Council of the People's Deputies, Emil Barth called for an action committee to oversee it and presented a list of names drawn up by the Revolutionary Stewards. The proposal took the SPD leadership by surprise and started heated debates in the assembly. Ebert was able to push through an "Executive Council of Workers' and Soldiers' Councils of Greater Berlin" (Vollzugsrat des Arbeiter- und Soldatenrates Grossberlin) made up of seven SPD members, seven from the USPD and fourteen mostly independent soldiers' representatives. It was to oversee the People's Deputies until the creation of a national assembly and was chaired by Richard Müller of the USPD and Brutus Molkenbuhr representing the soldiers.

On the evening of the same day, a phone call between Ebert and General Wilhelm Groener, the new First Quartermaster General, resulted in the unofficial and secret Ebert–Groener pact. In exchange for Groener's assurance of the army's support "for the good of the state", Ebert promised Groener that the military's hierarchies and command structures would not be changed. He thus made no attempt to democratise the authoritarian military. As Groener stated in his memoirs: "The best and strongest element of the old Prussianism was saved for the new Germany."

In the turmoil of the day, the Ebert government's acceptance of the Entente's harsh terms for a ceasefire after a renewed demand from the Supreme Army Command went almost unnoticed. On 11 November, the Centre Party deputy Matthias Erzberger signed the armistice agreement at Compiègne, France, on behalf of the government in Berlin, and World War I came to an end.

==== Interim government ====
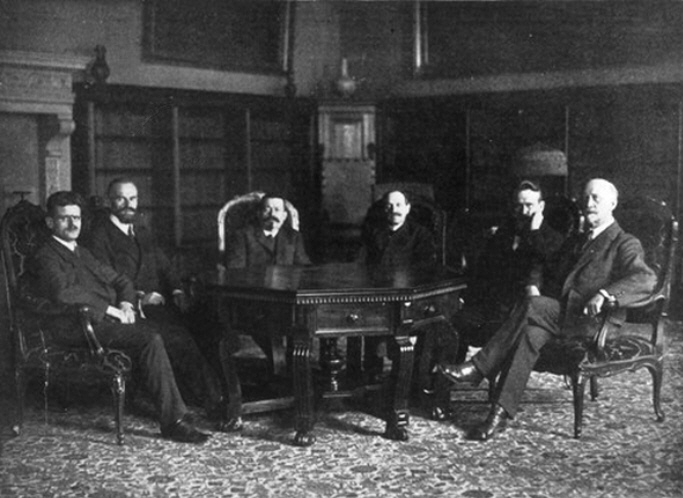
The Council of the People's Deputies. From left to right: Barth (USPD), Landsberg (SPD), Ebert (SPD), Haase (USPD), Dittmann (USPD), Scheidemann (SPD)

On 12 November, the Council of People's Deputies published its government programme in the proclamation "To the German People". It lifted the state of siege and censorship, granted amnesty to all political prisoners, guaranteed freedom of association, assembly and the press and abolished the rules that governed relations between servant and master. It also promised the introduction of direct, equal and universal suffrage for all women and men from the age of 20 years, the eight-hour workday and improvements in benefits for unemployment, social insurance and workers' compensation.

In theory, the Executive Council of Workers' and Soldiers' Councils of Greater Berlin was the highest-ranking council of the revolutionary regime and therefore Richard Müller the head of state of the newly declared "Socialist Republic of Germany", but in practice the Executive Council's initiative was blocked by internal power struggles. In the eight weeks of the double rule of the Executive Council and the Ebert-led government, the latter was always dominant. Although Haase was formally co-chairman in the Council of the People's Deputies with equal rights, the higher-level administration almost always preferred to work with the more moderate Ebert and the SPD.

The government saw its immediate tasks as fulfilling the terms of the Treaty of Versailles, demobilisation, providing adequate food and fuel supplies for a nation still under the Allied blockade and ensuring both internal and foreign security against separatists in the Rhine Province and Polish insurgents in the East. In order to make sure that the new democracy was firmly anchored, the government would have had to make an almost complete break with the old institutions, but the SPD decided that facing the immediate post-war crises was more important. To do that, it had to rely on existing structures and expertise within both the government and private enterprise. Even after 9 November, far from everything had collapsed. The administration continued to function. Civil servants from the imperial era were under the supervision of the councils but kept their positions and continued to do their work in most respects unchanged. The judiciary and education systems had been only minimally affected by the revolution if at all, and after the Ebert–Groener Pact, the Supreme Army Command became a partner of the Council of the People's Deputies. Generals and other high-ranking officers kept their positions. The Ebert government needed the OHL to manage the monumental problem of demobilisation, but the Council of the People's Deputies did not try to limit its powers to the most essential tasks. No attempt was made to dispossess the East Elbian nobility (which had historically provided much of the officer corps) or the bourgeois owners of large estates.

The SPD and USPD were under great time pressure to act. When the two parties formed their alliance, it chose to govern outside the imperial constitution. It instructed the Reichstag not to reconvene and decreed that the existing Federal Council of the states (Bundesrat) should exercise only its administrative functions, not its legislative powers. The Council in essence took over the former roles of the emperor, chancellor, Bundesrat and Reichstag. The council began working according to rules of procedure on 12 November. The rules prohibited unauthorised intervention in the administration by individual members of the council. Its instructions to the state secretaries had to be issued collectively and only as guidelines, not for individual cases.

Through the various councils, the socialists were able to establish a firm base at the local level. But while they believed that they were acting in the interest of the new order, the party leaders of the SPD regarded them as elements that threatened the peaceful changeover of power that they imagined had already taken place. Along with the middle-class parties, they pushed for speedy elections to a national assembly that would make the final decision on the form of the new state. The position soon brought the SPD into opposition with many of the revolutionaries. The USPD continued to want to delay elections until after the achievements of the revolution had been consolidated.

Although Ebert had saved the decisive position of the SPD and prevented a social revolution, he was not happy with the results. He did not regard the council assembly or the Executive Council as helpful, but rather as obstacles impeding a smooth transition from monarchy to a new system of government. The entire SPD leadership mistrusted the councils rather than the old elites in the army and administration. At the same time they considerably overestimated the old elite's loyalty to the new republic. Ebert could no longer act as chancellor in front of the OHL or his middle-class colleagues among the ministers and in the Reichstag, but only as chairman of a revolutionary government. In spite of having taken the lead of the revolution in order to halt it, conservatives saw him as a traitor.

==== Nationalisation and labour unions ====
At the insistence of the USPD representatives, the Council of People's Deputies appointed a "Nationalisation Committee" that included the Marxist theoreticians Karl Kautsky and Rudolf Hilferding, the chairman of the Socialist Miners' Union Otto Hue and a number of leading economists. The committee was to examine which industries were "fit" for nationalisation and to prepare for the nationalisation of the coal industry. It sat until 7 April 1919 without producing any tangible results. "Self-Administration Bodies" were installed only at coal and potash mines. From those bodies emerged the modern German Works Councils, or Factory Committees.

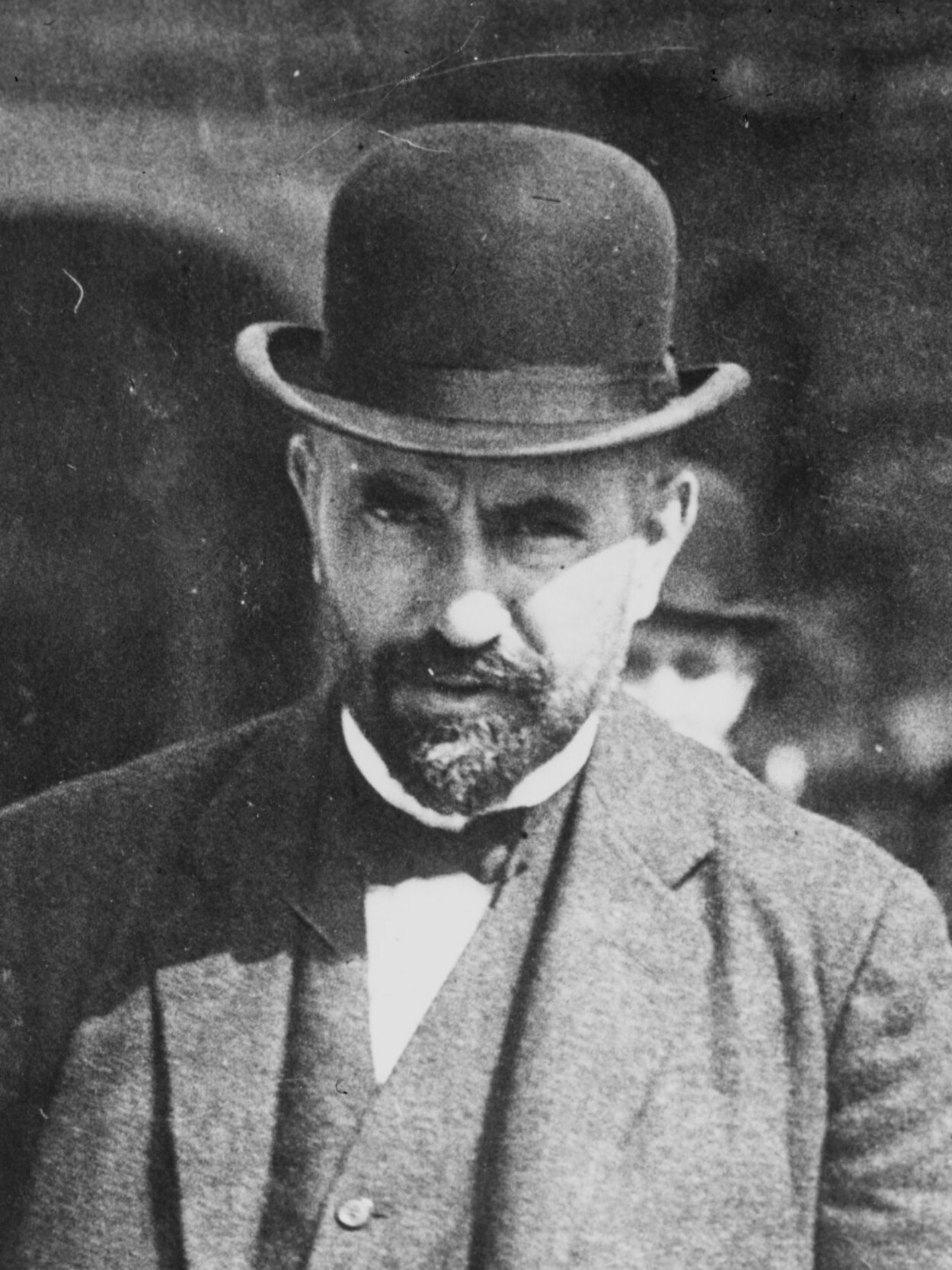
Hugo Stinnes, one of Germany's leading industrialists

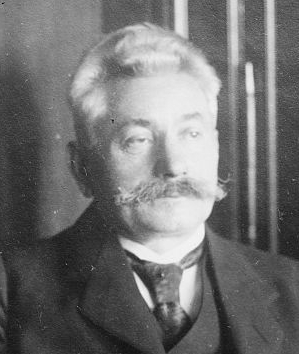
Carl Legien, who represented the unions in creating the agreement that shared his name

Like the SPD moderates, the unions also feared the councils because their supporters saw them as replacing the unions. To prevent such a development, union leader Carl Legien (SPD) met with representatives of heavy industry led by Hugo Stinnes in Berlin from 9 to 12 November. On 15 November, they signed the Stinnes–Legien Agreement, which had advantages for both sides. Employers acknowledged trade unions as the official representatives of the workforce and recognised their right to collective bargaining. The agreement also introduced the eight-hour day, allowed for the creation of workers' councils and arbitration committees in firms with more than 50 employees, and guaranteed that returning soldiers would have a right to their pre-war jobs. Future disputes were to be resolved through a newly created organisation called the "Central Working Group" (Zentralarbeitsgemeinschaft, or ZAG).

With the agreement, the unions achieved several of their longtime demands, and by their recognition of private enterprise, they made the efforts towards nationalising the means of production more difficult.

=== Turn to violence ===
==== Opposition from the Right ====
On 6 December 1918, in what was likely a putsch attempt, a group of armed students and soldiers, including some members of the People's Navy Division (Volksmarinedivision), went to the Reich Chancellery and asked Friedrich Ebert to accept the office of president with nearly dictatorial powers, an offer that Ebert carefully refused. At around the same time – although some sources say that it involved the same demonstrators who spoke to Ebert – a group of soldiers briefly took the members of the Executive Council into custody. In an unrelated incident several hours later, members of the Garde-Füsilier-Regiment, which was responsible for security in Berlin's government quarter, fired on an approved Spartacist demonstration, killing 16 and seriously wounding 12. It is not certain who gave the order to fire or who was behind the assumed putsch. The historian Heinrich August Winkler attributes it to "high-ranking officers and officials" who planned to have Ebert disband the workers' and soldiers' councils with the military's support.

Ebert and the Army High Command (OHL) had agreed that troops returning from the front would parade through Berlin on 10 December. Ebert greeted them with a glowing speech that included words that would help give rise to the stab-in-the-back myth: "No enemy overcame you." General Groener had wanted to use the soldiers to disarm the civilians of Berlin and rid it of Spartacists, but the majority of the soldiers wanted only to return home for Christmas with their families and simply dispersed into the city after the parade. Their lack of interest in more fighting put an end to Groener's hope that he could lead the troops to domestic successes that would make the OHL the recognized force in restoring order.

As a result of the events, the potential for violence and the danger of a coup from the Right became visible. Rosa Luxemburg, in the Spartacist newspaper Rote Fahne ("Red Flag"), set out ambitious demands "as immediate measures to protect the Revolution," including:

Disarmament of the entire police force and of all officers and nonproletarian soldiers; disarmament of all members of the ruling classes.
Confiscation of all weapons and munitions stocks as well as armaments factories by workers’ and soldiers’ councils.
Arming of the entire adult male proletarian population as a workers’ militia. Creation of a Red Guard of proletarians as an active part of the militia for the constant protection of the Revolution against counter-revolutionary attacks and subversions.

Two days later, the Reich Congress of Workers' and Soldiers' Councils rejected a motion by the Spartacus League and the Independent Social Democrats to invest total legislative and executive power into the workers' and soldiers' councils, effectively voting itself out of power in favor of a parliamentary system.

==== Reich Congress of Workers' and Soldiers' Councils ====
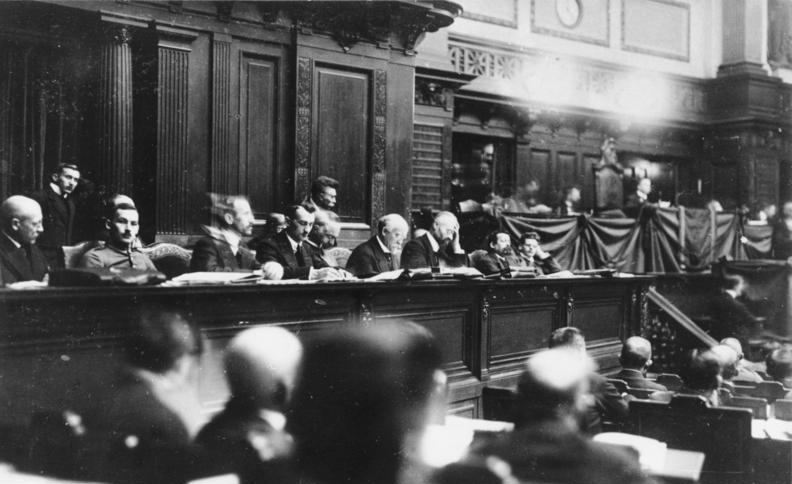
Reich Congress of Workers' and Soldiers' Councils. From right to left on the ministerial bench: Emil Barth, Friedrich Ebert, Otto Landsberg and Philipp Scheidemann

The Executive Council called for a meeting of the workers' and soldiers' councils from the entire country to be held in Berlin beginning on 16 December. When the Reich Congress of Workers' and Soldiers' Councils (Reichskongress der Arbeiter- und Soldatenräte) met in the hall of the Prussian House of Representatives, it consisted mainly of SPD followers. Not even Karl Liebknecht or Rosa Luxemburg had been chosen to attend, leaving the Spartacus League without influence. On 19 December, the Council voted 344 to 98 against the creation of a council system as the basis for a new constitution. Instead, they supported the government's decision to call for elections as soon as possible for a constituent national assembly to decide on the future state system.

The Congress then approved a proposal by the SPD to give the Council of the People's Deputies lawgiving and executive power until the national assembly made a final decision on the form of government. Oversight of the council was switched from the Berlin Executive Council to a new Central Council of the German Socialist Republic (Zentralrat der Deutschen Sozialistischen Republik). After the Congress accepted the SPD's definition of parliamentary oversight, the USPD boycotted the election to the Central Council, with the result that it had only SPD members.

With the oversight of the Berlin Executive Council, the People's Deputies were to exercise military command authority and to see to the ending of militarism. The Congress voted unanimously for the democratisation of the military as laid out in the Hamburg Points: there were to be no more rank insignia and no carrying of weapons when not in service; soldiers were to elect officers; soldiers' councils were to be responsible for discipline; and the standing army was to be replaced by a people's army (Volkswehr). The Army Command strongly objected to the Hamburg Points, and no trace of them was left in the Weimar Constitution.

==== Christmas crisis ====
Because the People's Navy Division had been helpful to the government in Kiel and was considered loyal, it was ordered to Berlin in early November to help protect the city's government quarter and stationed in the Royal Stables across from the Berlin Palace. Following the coup attempt of 6 December, the sailors deposed their commander because of his alleged involvement in it. The government came to see the division as generally standing with the leftist revolutionaries, and on 23 December, the Council of the People's Deputies ordered it out of Berlin, considerably reduced its size and refused the men their pay.

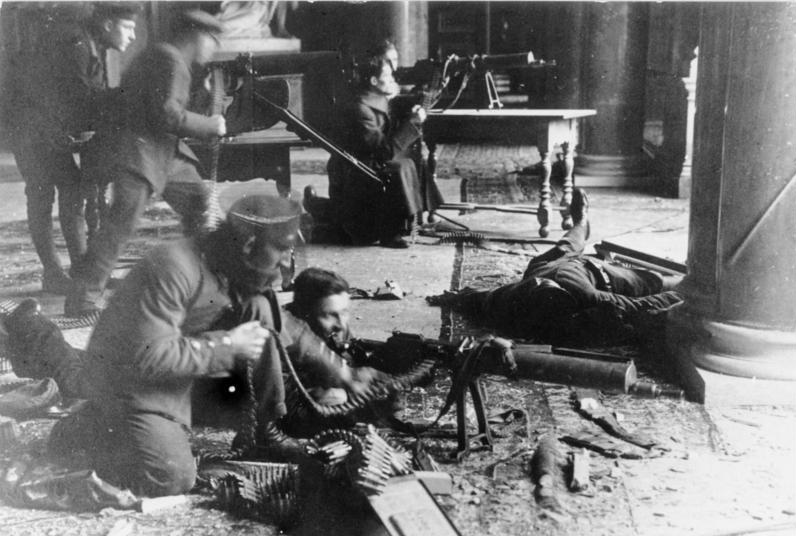
Leftist soldiers during Christmas fighting in the Berlin Palace

The sailors then occupied the Reich Chancellery, cut the phone lines, put the Council of People's Representatives under house arrest, and took Otto Wels hostage and physically abused him. Ebert, who was in touch with the Supreme Command in Kassel via a secret phone line, gave orders on the morning of 24 December to attack the Palace with troops loyal to the government. The sailors repelled the attack after they were joined by armed workers and the security forces of the Berlin police. The government troops had to withdraw with the loss of 56 soldiers. The People's Navy Division, which counted just 11 deaths, was allowed to remain intact, and the sailors received their pay.

The main result of the Christmas crisis, which the Spartacists named "Ebert's Bloody Christmas", was that the USPD resigned from the government in protest on 29 December. Its three members were replaced on the Council of the People's Deputies by two from the SPD: Gustav Noske (responsible for the military) and Rudolf Wissell (labour and social affairs). In light of the military's failure at the Berlin Palace, Noske ordered a strengthening of the Freikorps for use against internal enemies.

==== Founding of the Communist Party and Spartacist uprising ====
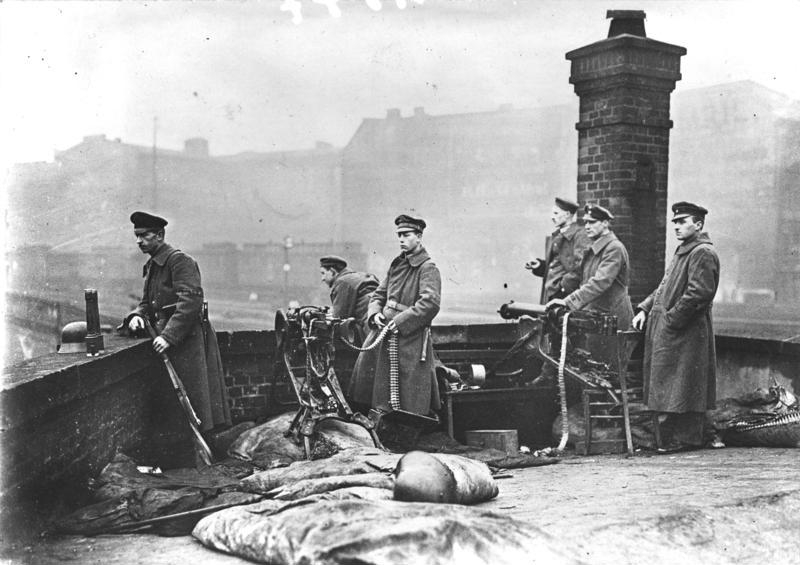
The occupation of the Silesian railway station in Berlin by government troops

After their experiences with the SPD and the USPD, the Spartacists concluded that their goals could be met only by forming a party of their own. They therefore joined with other left-socialist groups from across Germany to found the Communist Party of Germany (KPD).

Rosa Luxemburg drew up a founding programme and presented it on 31 December 1918. She wrote that the communists could never take power without the clear will of the majority of the people. She proposed that the KPD participate in the elections for a national assembly, but a motion to boycott the elections passed 62 to 23. In the words of Marxist historian Arthur Rosenberg, the majority still implicitly hoped to gain power through "putschist adventures". After deliberations with the Spartacists, the Revolutionary Stewards decided to remain in the USPD.

A wave of violence started on 4 January when the Prussian government dismissed the chief of the Berlin police, Emil Eichhorn (USPD), for supporting the People's Navy Division during the Christmas crisis. His dismissal led the USPD, Revolutionary Stewards and KPD chairmen Karl Liebknecht and Wilhelm Pieck to call for a demonstration the following day. On 5 January, as on 9 November 1918, hundreds of thousands of people poured into the centre of Berlin, many of them armed. In the afternoon, the train stations and the newspaper district with the offices of the middle-class press and the SPD' Vorwärts were occupied.

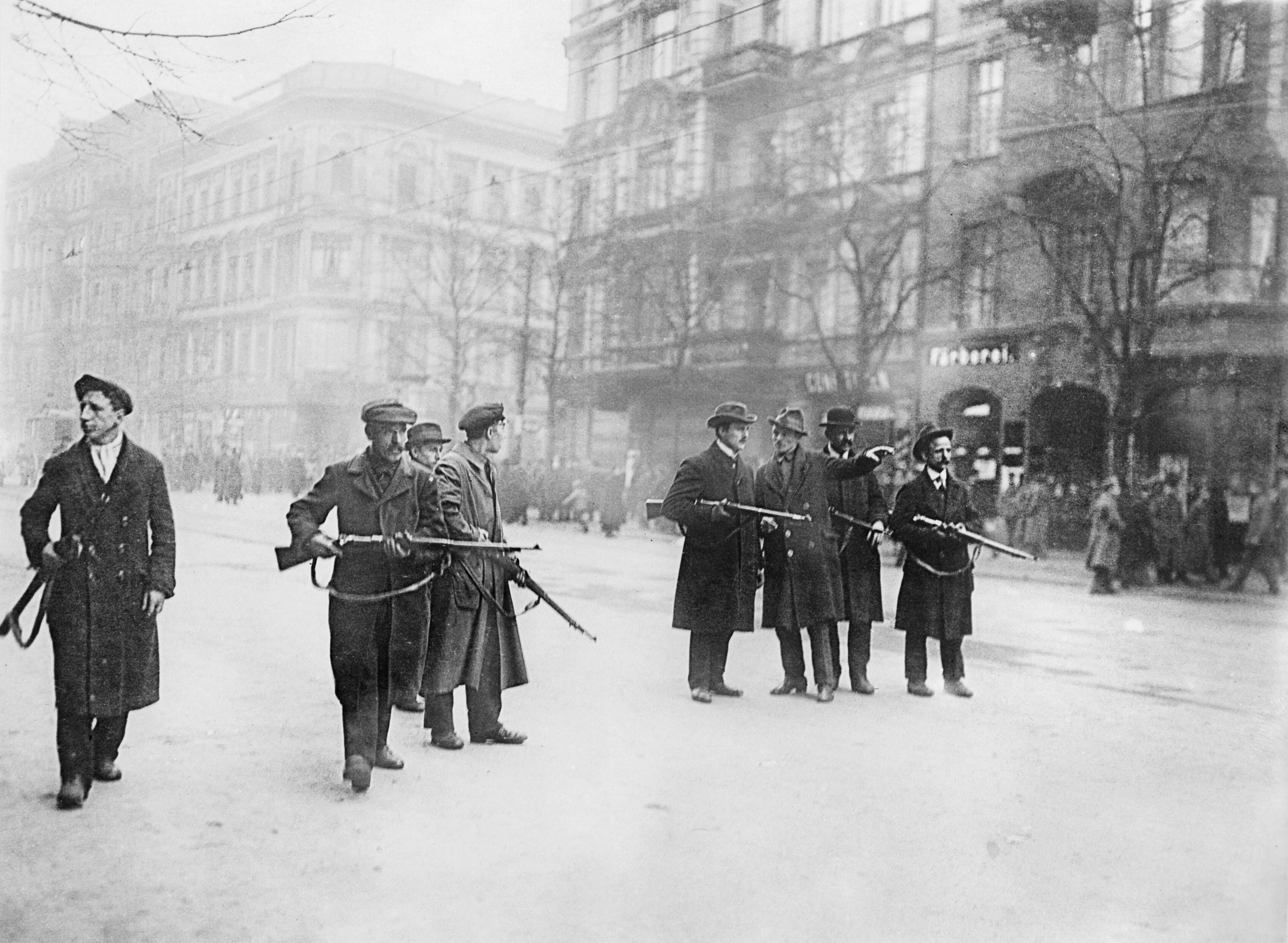
Spartacist militia in Berlin

The demonstrators were mainly the same people who had participated in the revolutionary actions in November who were demanding the fulfilment of their wish for a workers' government expressed two months previously. The so-called "Spartacist uprising" that followed originated only partially in the KPD. The Spartacists did not have a leading position in January 1919. KPD members were a minority among the insurgents.

The initiators of the revolt, who had gathered at the Police Headquarters, elected a 53-member "Interim Revolutionary Committee" (Provisorischer Revolutionsausschuss) that failed to make use of its power and was unable to give any clear direction. Liebknecht wanted the government overthrown and agreed with the majority of the Committee that supported an armed struggle. Rosa Luxemburg and other KPD leaders (Leo Jogiches, Karl Radek) thought a revolt at that time to be premature and spoke out against it, although Luxemburg later gave in and followed the will of the majority of the committee.

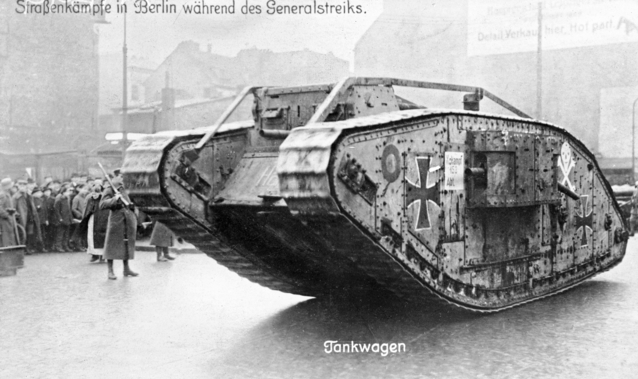
A British Mark IV tank, captured during World War I, in use by German government troops. Berlin, January 1919

On the following day, 6 January, the Revolutionary Committee again called for a mass demonstration. Even more people heeded the call and filled the streets from the Siegesallee to the Alexanderplatz. But the masses were leaderless; the Committee provided no direction and no orders to act. In addition, the protestors lacked support from the military. Even the People's Navy Division was unwilling to support the armed revolt and declared themselves neutral. The other regiments stationed in Berlin mostly remained loyal to the government. As a result, very little happened that day.

While more troops were moving into Berlin on Ebert's order, he accepted an offer by the USPD to mediate between the government and the Revolutionary Committee, but the negotiations failed the following day. On 8 January, in an appeal to the people of Berlin, the Council of the People's Deputies stated that "force can be fought only with force. ... The hour of reckoning approaches!" The USPD and KPD leadership decided to press ahead with the revolutionary overthrow of the Ebert government, but the masses were more interested in the unification of the parties of the Left. Finally, on 11 January, Freikorps forces attacked and took the Vorwärts building with heavy weaponry. Six parliamentarians who came out to negotiate a surrender were summarily shot. The remaining occupied buildings were taken the same day, and by 12 January the uprising was over. The death toll was estimated at 156.

The historian Eberhard Kolb calls the January Revolt the revolution's Battle of the Marne (Germany's July 1918 battlefield defeat that led directly to the Armistice). The 1919 uprising and its brutal end exacerbated the already deep divisions in the workers' movement and fuelled more political radicalisation.

==== Murder of Karl Liebknecht and Rosa Luxemburg ====
Rosa Luxemburg and Karl Liebknecht, the ringleaders of the January Revolt, were forced to go into hiding after its failure, but in spite of the urgings of their associates, they refused to leave Berlin. On the evening of 15 January 1919, the two were found by the authorities in an apartment in the Wilmersdorf district of Berlin. They were immediately arrested and handed over to the largest Freikorps unit, the heavily armed Guards Cavalry Rifle Division. Its staff officer, Captain Waldemar Pabst, had them questioned. The same night both prisoners were clubbed with the butt of a rifle and shot in the head. Karl Liebknecht's body, without a name, was delivered to a nearby morgue. Rosa Luxemburg's body was thrown into Berlin's Landwehr Canal, where it was found only on 1 July.

The perpetrators for the most part went unpunished. The Nazi Party later compensated the few who had been put on trial or jailed, and they merged the Garde-Kavallerie into the SA (Sturmabteilung). In an interview given to Der Spiegel in 1962 and in his memoirs, Pabst maintained that he had talked on the phone with Noske in the Chancellery and that Noske and Ebert had approved of his actions. Pabst's statement was never confirmed, especially since neither the Reichstag nor the courts ever examined the case.

==== Final revolts ====
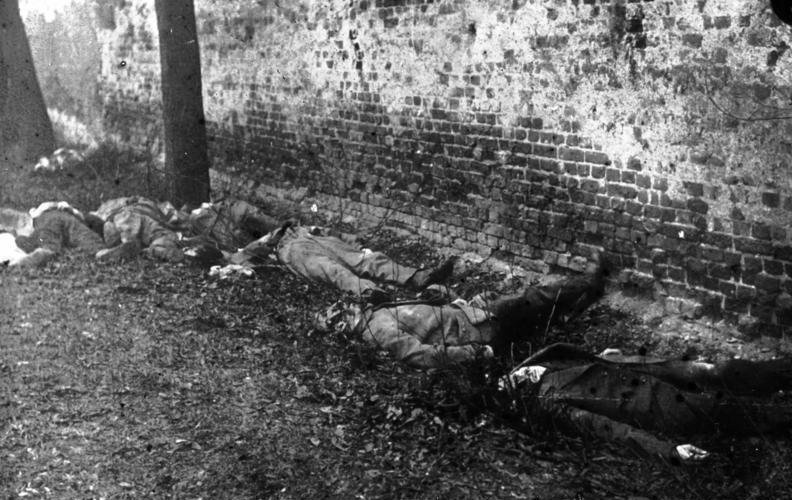
Dead revolutionaries in Berlin after summary execution, March 1919

In the first months of 1919, there were additional armed revolts in parts of Germany that culminated in the Berlin March Battles. The overall cause was continued disappointment among workers of the radical left that the revolution had not achieved the goals they had hoped for in November 1918: nationalisation of key industries, recognition of the workers' and soldiers' councils and establishment of a council republic. In 1919, however, attaining the goals would have required the overthrow of the Ebert government. General strikes were called in Upper Silesia in January, in the Ruhr district in February and in Saxony and Thuringia in February and March.

In Berlin, members of the USPD and KPD called for a general strike, which started on 4 March. Its key aims were the socialisation of major industries, democratisation of the military and the safeguarding of the position of the remaining workers' and soldiers' councils. Against the will of the leadership, the strikes escalated into street fighting. The Prussian state government, which had declared a state of siege, called on the Reich government for help. It responded with the deployment of both government and Freikorps troops. On 9 March, Gustav Noske, to whom executive power had been transferred, gave the order to shoot on sight anyone found carrying a weapon. By the end of the fighting on 16 March, the uprising had been bloodily quashed, with a death toll of at least 1,200.

Short-lived soviet republics were proclaimed in a number of cities and towns into early 1919, but only those in Bavaria and Bremen lasted longer than a few days. They were overthrown by government and Freikorps troops with considerable loss of life: 80 in Bremen (February) and about 600 in Munich (May).

According to the predominant opinion of modern historians, the establishment of a Bolshevik-style council government in Germany following the war would have been all but impossible. The Ebert government felt threatened by a coup from the Left and was certainly undermined by the Spartacus movement. That underlay its cooperation with the Supreme Army Command and the Freikorps. The brutal actions of the Freikorps during the various revolts estranged many left democrats from the SPD. They regarded the behaviour of Ebert, Noske and the other SPD leaders during the revolution as a betrayal of their own followers.

=== National Assembly and new Reich constitution ===
On 19 January 1919, Germans voted for representatives to a constituent national assembly in an election that included women for the first time. The SPD received the highest percentage of votes (38%), and with the Catholic Centre Party and the liberal German Democratic Party, it formed the Weimar Coalition. The USPD received only 7.6% of the vote; the KPD did not participate. To remove itself from the post-revolutionary confusion in Berlin, the National Assembly met in Weimar beginning on 6 February. The Assembly elected Friedrich Ebert temporary president on 11 February and Philipp Scheidemann minister president on 13 February.

In addition to drawing up and approving a new constitution, the Assembly was responsible for passing urgently needed Reich laws. In May it found itself embroiled in the highly contentious issue of whether or not to accept the terms of the Treaty of Versailles. Under intense pressure from the victorious Allies, it agreed on 16 June 1919 after Scheidemann resigned as minister president with the words, "What hand should not wither that puts itself and us in these fetters?" Gustav Bauer of the SPD took his place.

The Weimar Constitution was ratified by the National Assembly on 11 August and became effective three days later. It established a federal parliamentary republic (sometimes called a semi-presidential republic because of the strength of the presidency) with a comprehensive list of fundamental rights and a popularly elected Reichstag that was responsible for legislation, the budget, and control of the executive. The government, headed by the chancellor, was dependent on the confidence of the Reichstag. The president, who was elected by popular vote for seven years, could dissolve the Reichstag, and under Article 48 had the power to declare a state of emergency and issue emergency decrees when public security was threatened.

In October 1922, the Reichstag lengthened Ebert's term of office until 23 June 1925. He died in office a few months before then, and Paul von Hindenburg was elected the second and last president of the Republic. His use of Article 48 was instrumental in paving the way for Adolf Hitler's rise to power.

== Aftermath ==
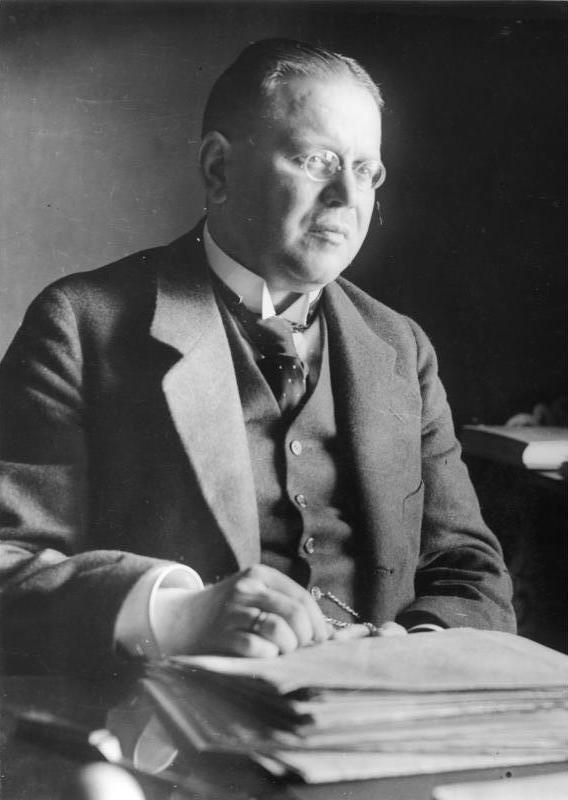
Matthias Erzberger, assassinated in 1921 by members of the radical Right because he had signed the Treaty of Versailles

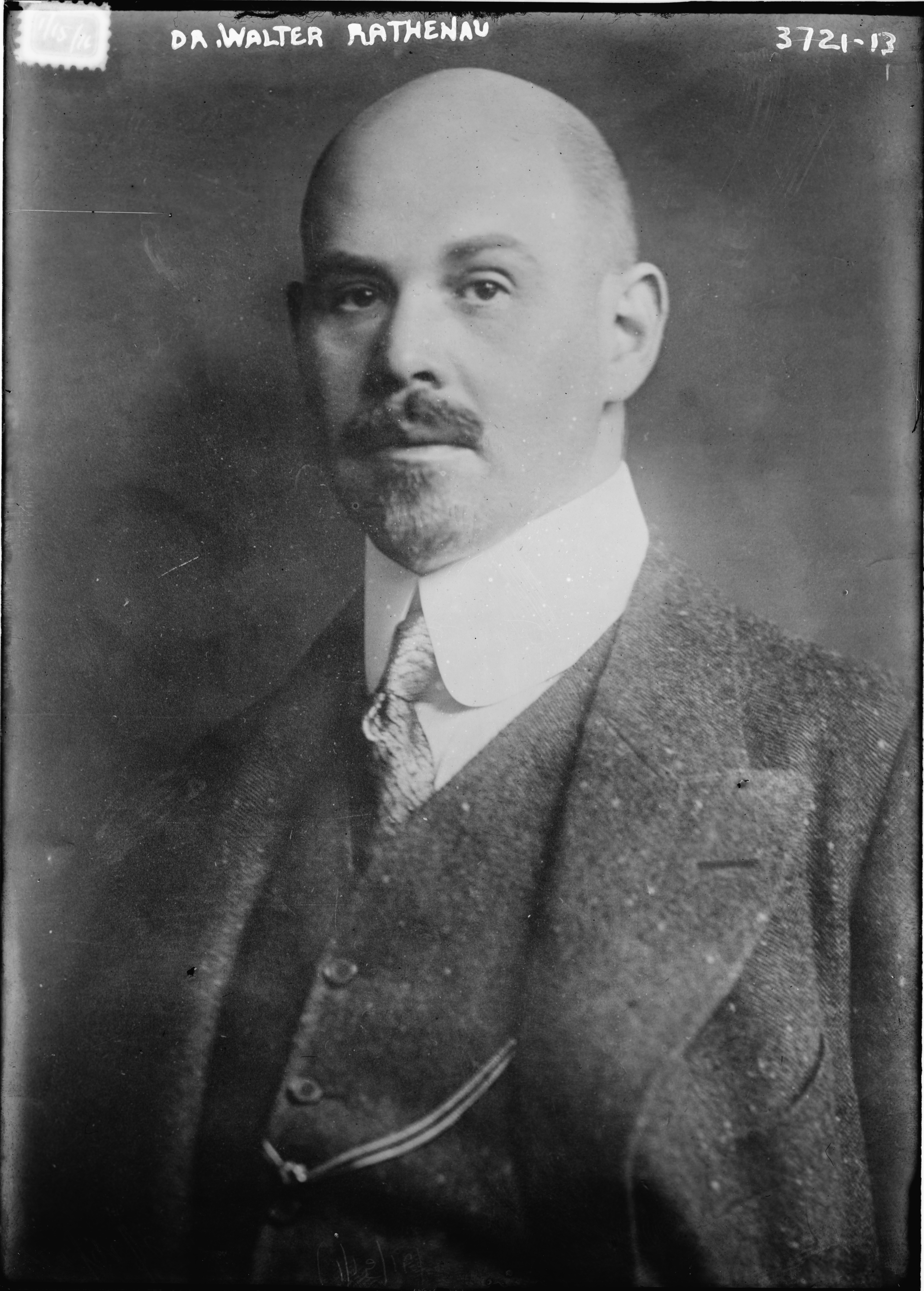
Walther Rathenau, Germany's Jewish foreign minister, who was assassinated in 1922

From 1920 to 1923, both nationalist and left-wing forces continued fighting against the Weimar Republic. In March 1920, a coup organized by Wolfgang Kapp (the Kapp Putsch) attempted to overthrow the government, but the venture collapsed within a few days under the effects of a general strike and the refusal of government employees to obey Kapp. Members of the ultra-nationalist Organisation Consul assassinated former minister of finance Matthias Erzberger in 1921 and Foreign Minister Walther Rathenau in 1922. The recently formed Nazi Party, under the leadership of Adolf Hitler, in what is now known as the Beer Hall Putsch, planned to take over the government of Bavaria, march to Berlin and seize control of the Reich government. Their attempt, made on 9 November 1923, was stopped in Munich by the local police, Hitler was arrested and sentenced to five years in prison. He was released in less than a year.

In the wake of the Kapp Putsch, civil war-like fighting broke out with the Ruhr uprising when the Ruhr Red Army, made up of some 50,000 armed workers, mostly adherents of the KPD and USPD, used the disruption caused by the putsch to take control of the regions' industrial district. After bloody battles in which an estimated 1,000 insurgents and 200 soldiers died, Reichswehr and Freikorps units suppressed the revolt in early April. In the March Action of 1921, the KPD, the Communist Workers' Party of Germany (KAPD) and other far-left organisations attempted a communist uprising in the industrial regions of central Germany. It was quashed by government troops.

From 1924 to 1929, the Weimar Republic was relatively stable. The period, known in Germany as the "Goldene Zwanziger" (Golden Twenties), was marked by internal consolidation and rapprochement in foreign affairs along with a growing economy and a consequent decrease in civil unrest.

== Impact on the Weimar Republic ==
The revolution ended the monarchical system both in the Empire and its individual states, did away with hereditary titles of nobility and introduced equal suffrage in elections, including for women. By doing so, the revolution created a representative democracy, a form of government with which Germany as a nation had had no prior experience. In order to take advantage of existing expertise during the crises of the period, the revolution left much of the military hierarchy and imperial civil service, including the judiciary and educational system, largely untouched. Many of the people who stayed in their positions were monarchists who did not want a republic and worked to undermine it throughout Weimar's life. Far-right extremists, especially certain members of the former officer corps, used the stab-in-the-back myth to blame an alleged conspiracy of communists, socialists and Jews for Germany's defeat in World War I. The myth fell on fertile ground in nationalist circles. They employed it to defame as "November criminals" the revolutionaries and politicians such as Ebert who never wanted the revolution and had done everything they could to channel and contain it.

Further complicating the revolution's legacy was the fact that it came not long after the Russian Revolution and the bloody civil war that followed it. Germans across the political spectrum, with the exception of the extreme Left, feared that there would be a similar communist uprising in Germany and actively opposed any additional movement to the left. The revolution's failure to implement a communist system resulted in a permanent schism in the Left that contributed to the Weimar Republic's long-term political instability. The SPD supported the revolution and its parliamentary fruits, whereas the KPD fought to continue the struggle and accused the ruling Social Democrats of having betrayed the ideals of the workers' movement by blocking the creation of a council republic.

Both political extremes were determined to bring down the Weimar Republic. In the end, the far Right was successful, and the Weimar Republic came to an end with the ascent of Hitler and the National Socialist Party. The fractures in the German Left that had become permanent during the revolution made Adolf Hitler's rise to power in 1933 easier than it might have been if the Left had been more united.

== Contemporary statements ==
Depending on their political standpoints, contemporaries had greatly differing opinions about the revolution.

Ernst Troeltsch, a Protestant theologian and philosopher, rather calmly remarked how the majority of Berlin citizens perceived 10 November:

On Sunday morning, after a frightful night, the morning newspapers gave a clear picture: the Emperor in Holland, the revolution victorious in most urban centres, the royals in the states abdicating. No man dead for Emperor and Empire! The continuation of duties ensured and no run on the banks! ... Trams and subways ran as usual, which is a pledge that basic needs are cared for. On all faces it could be read: Wages will continue to be paid.

The liberal journalist Theodor Wolff wrote – incorrectly, according to historian Sebastian Haffner who quotes him – on 10 November in the newspaper Berliner Tageblatt:

Like a sudden storm, the biggest of all revolutions has toppled the imperial regime, including everything that belonged to it. It can be called the greatest of all revolutions because never has a more firmly built ... fortress been taken in this manner at the first attempt. Only one week ago, there was still a military and civil administration so deeply rooted that it seemed to have secured its dominion beyond the change of times. ... Only yesterday morning, at least in Berlin, all this still existed. Yesterday afternoon it was all gone.

The extreme Right had a completely opposite perception. On 10 November, conservative journalist Paul Baecker wrote an article in Deutsche Tageszeitung which already contained essential elements of the stab-in-the-back myth:

The work fought for by our fathers with their precious blood – dismissed by betrayal in the ranks of our own people! Germany, yesterday still undefeated, left to the mercy of our enemies by men carrying the German name, by felony out of our own ranks broken down in guilt and shame.
The German socialists knew that peace was at hand anyway and that it was only a matter of holding out against the enemy for a few days or weeks in order to wrest bearable conditions from them. In this situation they raised the white flag.
This is a sin that can never be forgiven and never will be forgiven. This is treason not only against the monarchy and the army but also against the German people themselves who will have to bear the consequences in centuries of decline and of misery.

In an article on the 10th anniversary of the revolution, the journalist Kurt Tucholsky remarked that neither Wolff nor Baecker were right. Nevertheless, Tucholsky accused Ebert and Noske of betrayal, not of the monarchy but of the revolution. Although he wanted to regard it as only a coup d'état, he analysed the course of events more clearly than most of his contemporaries. In 1928 he wrote in "November Coup":

The German Revolution of 1918 took place in a hall.

The things taking place were not a revolution. There was no spiritual preparation, no leaders ready in the dark; no revolutionary goals. The mother of this revolution was the soldiers' longing to be home for Christmas. And weariness, disgust and weariness.
The possibilities that nevertheless were lying in the streets were betrayed by Ebert and his like. Fritz* Ebert, whom you cannot heighten to a personality by calling him Friedrich, opposed the establishment of a republic only until he found there was a post of chairman to be had; comrade Scheidemann è tutti quanti, all were would-be senior civil servants. (* Fritz is the colloquial term for Friedrich like Willy is for William.)

The following possibilities were left out: shattering federal states, division of landed property, revolutionary socialization of industry, reform of administrative and judiciary personnel. A republican constitution in which every sentence rescinds the next one, a revolution talking about well-acquired rights of the old regime, can be only laughed at.

The German Revolution is still to take place.

Walther Rathenau was of a similar opinion. He called the revolution a "disappointment", a "present by chance", a "product of desperation", a "revolution by mistake". It did not deserve the name because it did "not abolish the actual mistakes" but "degenerated into a degrading clash of interests".

Not a chain was broken by the swelling of spirit and will, only a lock merely rusted through. The chain fell off and the freed stood amazed, helpless, embarrassed and needed to arm against their will. The ones sensing their advantage were the quickest.

The historian Sebastian Haffner in turn came out against Tucholsky and Rathenau. He lived through the revolution in Berlin as a child and wrote 50 years later in his book about one of the myths related to the events of November 1918 that had taken root especially in the bourgeoisie:

It is often said that a true revolution in Germany in 1918 never took place. All that really happened was a breakdown. It was only the temporary weakness of the police and army in the moment of military defeat which let a mutiny of sailors appear as a revolution. At first sight, one can see how wrong and blind it is comparing 1918 with 1945. In 1945 there really was a breakdown. Certainly a mutiny of sailors started the revolution in 1918, but it was only a start. What made it extraordinary is that a mere sailors' mutiny triggered an earthquake which shook all of Germany; that the whole home army, the whole urban workforce and in Bavaria a part of the rural population rose up in revolt. This revolt was not just a mutiny anymore, it was a true revolution ... As in any revolution, the old order was replaced by the beginnings of a new one. It was not just destructive but also creative ... As a revolutionary achievement of masses the German November 1918 does not need to take second place to either the French July 1789 or the Russian March 1917.

=== Historical research ===
The Revolution of 1918/19 is one of the most important events in the modern history of Germany, yet it is poorly embedded in German historical memory. The failure of the Weimar Republic that the revolution brought into being and the Nazi era that followed it for a long time obstructed the view of the events. The democratic centre parties, especially the SPD, were also only minimally interested in fairly assessing the events which turned Germany into a republic.

During the Nazi regime, works on the Weimar Republic and the German revolution published abroad and by exiles could not be read in Germany. Around 1935, that affected the first published history of the Weimar Republic by Arthur Rosenberg. In his view, the political situation at the beginning of the revolution was open: the moderate socialist and democratically oriented workforce had a chance to become the social foundation of the republic and to drive back the conservative forces. It failed because of bad decisions by the SPD leadership and because of the revolutionary tactics employed by the extreme left wing of the workforce.

After 1945, West German historical research on the Weimar Republic concentrated most of all on its decline. In 1951, Theodor Eschenburg mostly ignored the revolutionary beginning of the republic. In 1955, Karl Dietrich Bracher also dealt with the German revolution from the perspective of the failed republic. Erich Eyck shows how little the revolution after 1945 was regarded as part of German history. His two-volume History of the Weimar Republic gave barely 20 pages to the events. The same can be said for Karl Dietrich Erdmann's contribution to the 8th edition of the Gebhardt Handbook for German History (Gebhardtsches Handbuch zur Deutschen Geschichte), whose viewpoint dominated the interpretation of events related to the German revolution after 1945. According to Erdmann, 1918/19 was about the choice between "social revolution in line with forces demanding a proletarian dictatorship and parliamentary republic in line with the conservative elements like the German officer corps". As most Social Democrats were forced to join with the old elites to prevent an imminent council dictatorship, the blame for the failure of the Weimar Republic was to be put on the extreme Left, and the events of 1918/19 were successful defensive actions of democracy against Bolshevism.

This interpretation at the height of the Cold War was based on the assumption that the extreme Left was comparably strong and a real threat to democratic development. On this point, West German researchers ironically found themselves in line with Marxist historiography in the German Democratic Republic (GDR), which attributed considerable revolutionary potential most of all to the Spartacists.

While in the postwar years the majority SPD (MSPD) was cleared of its Nazi odium as "November Criminals", GDR historians blamed the SPD for "betrayal of the working class" and the USPD leadership for their incompetence. Their interpretation was mainly based on the 1958 theories of the Central Committee of the Socialist Unity Party of Germany according to which the German revolution was defined as a "bourgeois-democratic revolution", led in certain aspects by proletarian means and methods. The fact that a revolution by the working class in Germany never happened could be attributed to the "subjective factor", especially the absence of a "Marxist-Leninist offensive party". Contrary to the official party line, Rudolf Lindau supported the theory that the German revolution had a Socialist tendency.

In the GDR, the founding of the KPD (Communist Party of Germany) was consistently declared to be the decisive turning point in German history, but in spite of ideological bias, historical research in the GDR expanded detailed knowledge of the German revolution.

During the 1950s, West German historians had focused their research on the final stages of the Weimar Republic. In the 1960s, they shifted to its revolutionary beginnings, realising that the decisions and developments during the revolution were central to the failure of the first German republic. The workers' and soldiers' councils especially moved into focus, and their previous appearance as a far-left movement had to be revised extensively. Authors like Ulrich Kluge, Eberhard Kolb and Reinhard Rürup argued that in the first weeks of the revolution the social base for a democratic redesign of society was much stronger than previously thought and that the potential of the extreme Left was weaker than the SPD's leadership, for example, assumed.

As Bolshevism posed no real threat, the scope of action for the Council of the People's Deputies (also supported by the more reform-oriented councils) to democratise the administration, military and society had been relatively large, but the SPD's leadership did not take the step because it trusted in the loyalty of the old elites and mistrusted the spontaneous mass movements in the first weeks of the revolution. The result was the radicalisation of the council movement. The theories were supported by the publications of the minutes of the Council of the People's Deputies. Increasingly, the history of the German revolution appeared as the history of its gradual reversal.

This new interpretation of the German revolution gained acceptance in research rather quickly even though older perceptions remained alive. Research concerning the composition of the worker's and soldier's councils, which today can be easily verified by sources, is undisputed to a large extent, but the interpretation of the revolutionary events based on the research has been criticised and partially modified since the end of the 1970s. Criticism was aimed at the partially idealised description of the workers' and soldiers' councils, which especially was the case in the wake of the German Student Movement of the 1960s (1968). Peter von Oertzen went particularly far in this respect, describing a social democracy based on councils as a positive alternative to the bourgeois republic. In comparison, Wolfgang J. Mommsen did not regard the councils as a homogeneous, focused movement for democracy but as a heterogeneous group with a multitude of different motivations and goals. Eckhard Jesse and Henning Köhler talked about the "construct of a democratic council movement". Certainly, the authors also excluded a relapse to the positions of the 1950s: "The councils to a large extent were neither communist-oriented, nor can the policies of the majority SPD in every aspect be labelled fortuitous and worth praising."

Heinrich August Winkler tried to find a compromise, according to which the Social Democrats depended to a limited extent on cooperation with the old elites but went considerably too far: "With more political willpower they could have changed more and preserved less."

With all the differences concerning details, historical researchers agree that in the German revolution, the chances to put the republic on a firm footing were considerably better than the dangers coming from the radical left. Instead, the alliance of the SPD with the old elites constituted a considerable structural problem for the Weimar Republic.

== See also ==
- Finnish Civil War
- Greater Poland uprising (1918–1919)
- Hungarian Soviet Republic
- Silesian Uprisings
- Revolutions of 1917–1923
- First Red Scare

== Citations ==
=== Sources ===
- Haffner, Sebastian (1991). Die deutsche Revolution 1918/1919 [The German Revolution 1918/1919] (in German). Munich: Knauer. ISBN 978-3426038130.
- —— (2002). Der Verrat: Deutschland 1918/1919 [The Betrayal: Germany 1918/1919] (in German). Berlin: Verlag 1900. ISBN 978-3930278008.
- Hoffrogge, R. (12 September 2014). Working class politics in the German Revolution: Richard Müller, the revolutionary shop stewards and the origins of the council movement. Historical Materialism Book Series. Brill. ISBN 978-90-04-21921-2.
- Huber, Ernst Rudolf (1978). Deutsche Verfassungsgeschichte seit 1789 [German Constitutional History since 1789] (in German). Vol. V. Weltkrieg, Revolution und Reichserneuerung: 1914–1919 [World War, Revolution and Reich Renewal: 1914–1919]. Stuttgart: W. Kohlhammer. ISSN 0066-6505.
- Kolb, Eberhard (1984). Die Weimarer Republik [The Weimar Republic] (in German). Munich / Vienna: Oldenbourg. ISBN 978-3486489118.
- Mommsen, Hans (1996). The Rise and Fall of Weimar Democracy. Translated by Forster, Elborg; Jones, Larry Eugene. Chapel Hill, NC: University of North Carolina Press. ISBN 0-8078-4721-6.
- Sontheimer, Kurt (1978) [1962]. Antidemokratisches Denken in der Weimarer Republik. Die politischen Ideen des deutschen Nationalismus zwischen 1918 und 1933 [Anti-democratic thinking in the Weimar Republic. The political ideas of German nationalism between 1918 and 1933] (in German). Munich: Deutscher Taschenbuch Verlag. ISBN 978-3423043120.
- Weitz, Eric D. (2018). Weimar Germany: Promise and Tragedy. Princeton University Press. ISBN 978-0-691-18305-3.
- Winkler, Heinrich August (May–June 1990). "Choosing the Lesser Evil: The German Social Democrats and the Fall of the Weimar Republic". Journal of Contemporary History. 25 (2/3): 205–227. doi:10.1177/002200949002500203. JSTOR 260730.
- —— (1993). Weimar 1918–1933. Die Geschichte der ersten deutschen Demokratie [Weimar 1918–1933. The History of the First German Democracy] (in German). Munich: C.H. Beck. ISBN 3-406-37646-0.
- —— (2000). Der Lange Weg nach Westen [The Long Road to the West] (in German). Vol. 1: 1789–1933. Munich: C.H. Beck. ISBN 978-3-406-66049-8.
