= Emil Barth =

German politician (1879–1941)

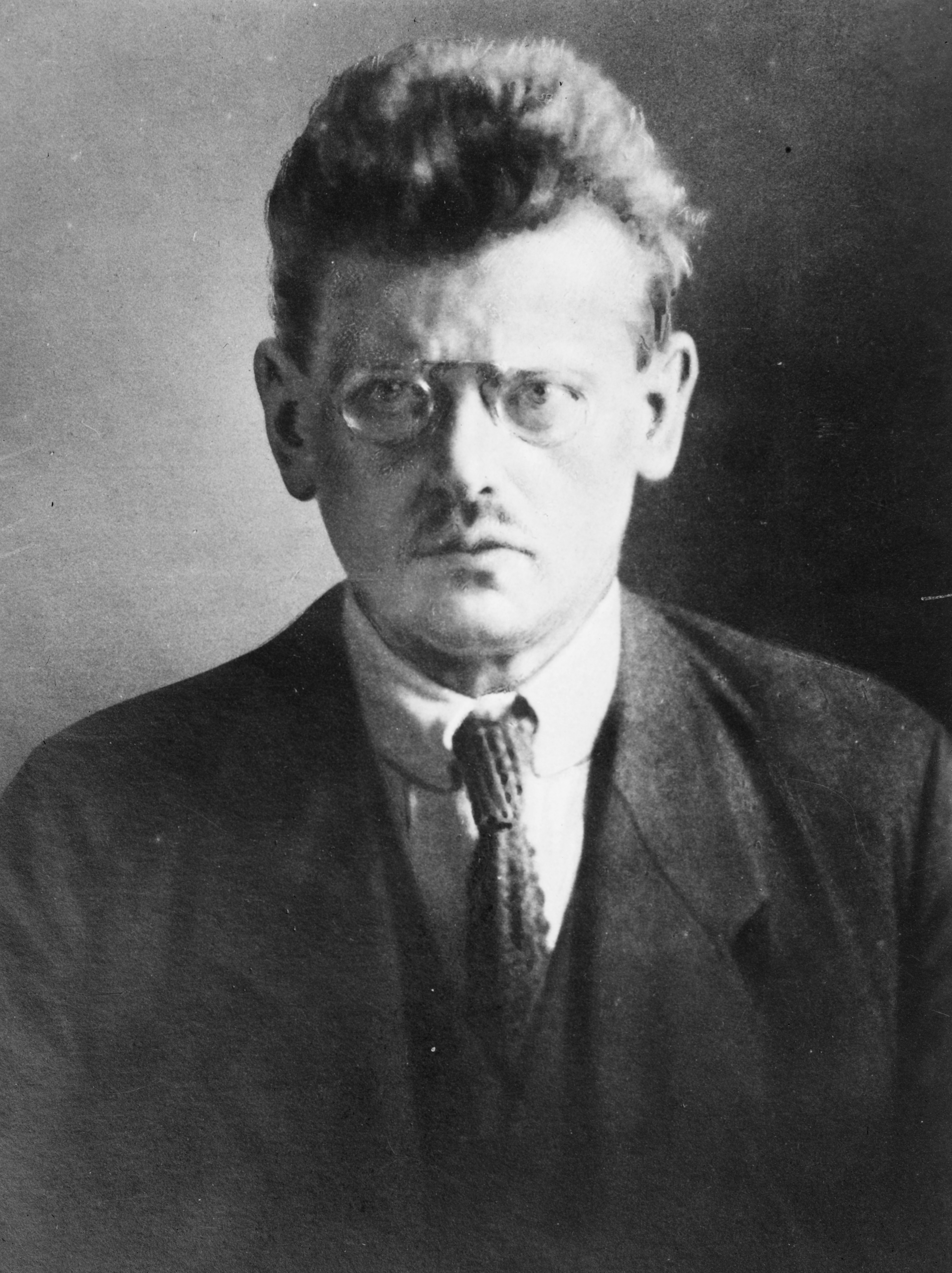
Barth in Berlin, 1918

Emil Barth (Heidelberg, 23 April 1879 – Berlin, 17 July 1941) was a German Social Democratic party worker and socialist politician who became a key figure in the German Revolution of 1918.

== Life ==
Barth was born into a working-class family.

Barth joined the anti-war Independent Social Democratic Party (USPD) in 1917, and became leader of the revolutionary shop stewards in January 1918.

He was one of six members of the Council of the People's Deputies (Rat der Volksbeauftragten) created on 10 November 1918 in Berlin to govern Germany after Kaiser Wilhelm II had abdicated and the Republic had been proclaimed by Karl Liebknecht and Philipp Scheidemann. Three members of the Council were Majority Social Democrats (Ebert, Scheidemann and Landsberg), and three were Independent Social Democrats (Haase, Dittmann and Barth). While the former two USPD commissioners were moderate and interested in conciliation with the MSPD, Barth was the most left-wing, associated with Karl Liebknecht, who refused to serve on the Council because it had a non-revolutionary majority. That same day, 10 November, Barth first acceded to Ebert's plan to place the revolutionary soldiers back under the command of their (counter-revolutionary) officers, but then changed his position in a drawn-out but stormy speech later that evening. The soldiers should not submit to the old "discipline" of their officers. Many heeded Barth's call, and the revolution gained momentum during November.

On 29 December 1918, Barth and the other USPD members resigned from the Council to protest Ebert's use of the military to quash an uprising by revolutionary sailors demanding back pay. The Council then added two MSPD members, Gustav Noske and Rudolf Wissell.

Although he became somewhat more moderate by the end of 1918, Barth had always been the Council's most radical member, calling on workers, for instance, not to 'debase the revolution to a movement for wages,' since that would merely ameliorate conditions, making fundamental change less likely (in an article in Die Rote Fahne, 28 November 1918). In 1920 Barth published his memoirs as From the Workshop of the Revolution, in which he claimed that the USPD had worked toward fomenting revolution against the German war machine already years earlier, and portrayed himself somewhat grandiosely as a major leader. That book was later (for instance in the 1925 Dolchstoss-Trial) used as evidence that the left had undermined the war effort.

In 1921/22 Barth became a member of the Social Democrats (SPD) when the MSPD and USPD merged into one party again. (He did not join the more radical Communist Party KPD, which had split from the USPD in early 1919.) He held some speeches for the SPD during the 1920s, and was arrested several times during the Nazi period after 1933. He died in 1941.

== Works ==
- Emil Barth, Geldwert, Geldentwertung und Proletariat (Berlin: A. Hoffmann, 1919), 37 pages.
- Emil Barth, Sozialisierung: Ihre Notwendigkeit, ihre Möglichkeit (Neukölln: Selbstverlag, 1920), 37 pages.
- Emil Barth et al., Aus der Werkstatt der deutschen Revolution (Berlin: A. Hoffmann, 1920), 158 pages.
- Emil Barth, "Die Revolution vom Januar 1918 bis Marz 1919," NL Barth, K II: "Manuskripte und Aufsatze," No. 275 (Archiv der Sozialen Demokratie, Bonn).
- Emil Barth, Cajetan Freund, and Theodor Heller, Das Erbauungsbuch des guten Handwerkers [exhibition Munich, 1927: "Das Bayerische Handwerk"] (Munich: Deukula-Verlag Grassinger & Co., 1927), 68 pages.

== Secondary Literature ==
Contemporaries' Accounts

- Dittmann, Wilhelm, Erinnerungen (ed. by Jürgen Rojahn, 3 vols.) (Frankfurt: Campus, 1995).
- Müller, Richard, Vom Kaiserreich zur Republik (Berlin: Malikverlag, 1925; Berlin: Olle & Wolter, 1979)(2 vols.).
- Müller-Franken, Hermann, Die Novemberrevolution: Erinnerungen (Berlin: Der Bücherkreis, 1928).

Scholarly Works

- Broue, Pierre, Ian Birchall, and Brian Pearce, The German Revolution, 1917–1923 (Chicago: Haymarket, 2006), 991 pages (translated by John Archer).
- Coper, Rudolf, Failure of a Revolution: Germany in 1918–1919 (Cambridge University Press, 1955).
- Harman, Chris, The Lost Revolution: Germany 1918 to 1923 (Chicago: Haymarket, 2003). [see especially the glossary entry on Barth, p. 309]
- Hoffrogge, Ralf: Working-Class Politics in the German Revolution, Richard Müller, the Revolutionary Shop Stewards and the Origins of the Council Movement, Brill Publishers, Leiden 2014, ISBN 9789004219212.
- Maehl, William Harvey, The German Socialist Party (American Philosophical Society, 1987). This work draws on unpublished manuscripts in Barth's papers in the Archiv der Sozialen Demokratie in Bonn.
- Matthias, Erich and Susanne Miller, Die Regierung der Volksbeauftragten 1918/19: Erster Teil (Düsseldorf, Droste, 1969).
- Miller, Susanne, "Der Nachlass Emil Barth," IWK 3(1966), 26-27.
- Ryder, A.J., The German Revolution of 1918: A Study of German Socialism in War and Revolt (Cambridge University Press, 1967).
