= Revolutionary Stewards =

Union stewards backing the 1918/19 German Revolution

During the First World War (1914–1918), the Revolutionary Stewards (German: Revolutionäre Obleute) or Revolutionary Shop Stewards were factory shop stewards who were independent of the official unions and freely chosen by workers in various German industries. They rejected the war policies of the German Empire and the support which parliamentary representatives of the Social Democratic Party (SPD) gave to the policies. They also played a role during the German Revolution of 1918–19.

Their leader, Richard Müller, stated that their goal was a "council republic in the Russian style”.

== Background ==
The SPD, at the time the largest workers' party in Europe, voted for war bonds for the imperial government in 1914. Karl Liebknecht was initially the only SPD member of the Reichstag who publicly rejected the measure. After having followed party discipline and voting for the bonds in August, he voted against the measure in December 1914. With the split between the Independent Social Democratic Party (USPD) and the Majority SPD (MSPD), there was a party in the Reichstag opposing the policy of "party truce" (Burgfriedenspolitik) between the various political parties. The Stewards supported the USPD's outright opposition to the war.

== January 1918: anti-war strike ==
Since most of the union functionaries supported the political truce, the Stewards created an opposition of industrial workers against the First World War in Germany. This was in part a reaction to the growing number of deaths on the front and the growing social need at home. Their most important speakers were Richard Müller and Emil Barth. The Revolutionary Stewards were especially strongly represented in the Berlin armament industry. They had already had experience with strikes, including the protest strike against the trial of Karl Liebknecht in summer 1916 and the wave of strikes centered on Braunschweig and Leipzig in January 1917.

The Stewards were a crucial force in organising the January Strike of 1918, which was centred on Berlin, the Ruhr, Saxony, Hamburg, and Kiel, in which strikers demanded the end of the war through a negotiated peace and a democratisation of the empire. They were in part inspired by the success achieved by the Bolsheviks under Lenin and Trotsky in the Russian October Revolution only a few months earlier. For this reason, the strikes were also directed against plans of annexation, which the Central Powers (Germany and Austria-Hungary) were pursuing in ongoing peace negotiations with Soviet Russia in Brest-Litovsk. The strikers demanded fundamental political changes within Germany as well as a just peace agreement with Russia that did not include territorial claims by the German Empire against the "New Russia". The demands were not met by the Supreme Army Command and the imperial government of Chancellor Georg von Hertling.

The strike was ended when the Supreme Army Command declared an aggravated state of siege, put some factories under military protection, and conscripted many of the striking workers for military service.

== November Revolution and council movement ==
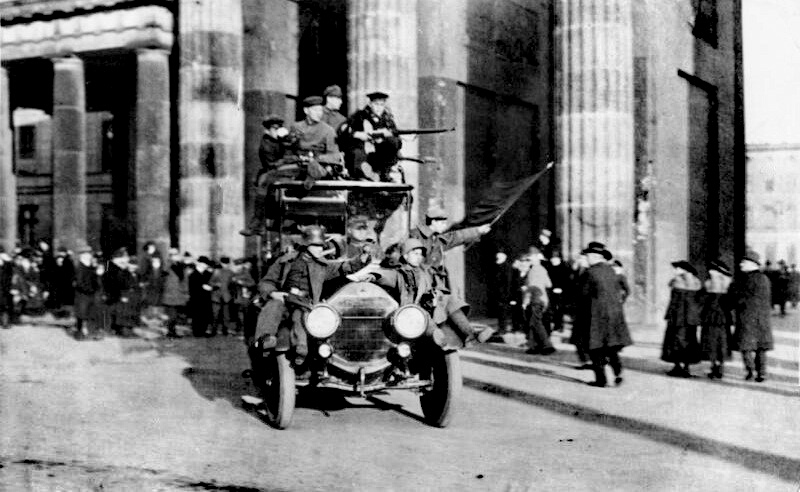
November Revolution of 1918: Revolutionary soldiers of the Red Flag on 9 November 1918 at the Brandenburg Gate in Berlin.

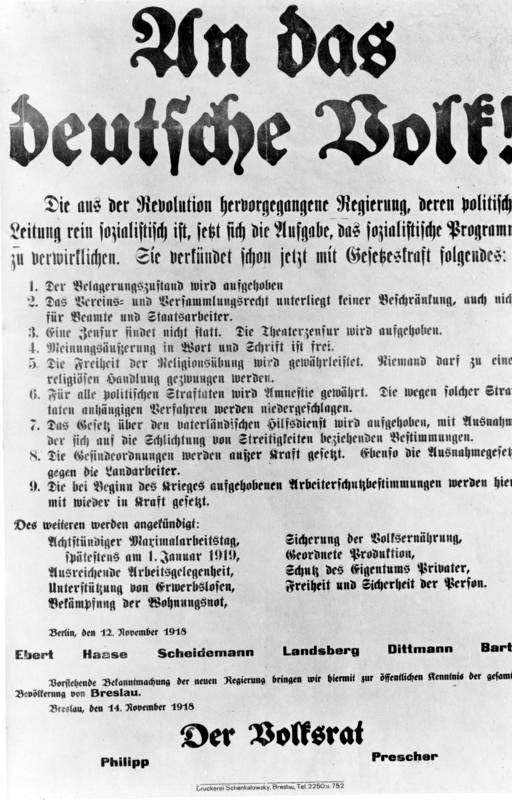
Announcement poster of the revolutionary government of 12 November 1918, signed by representative of the Revolutionary Stewards, Emil Barth

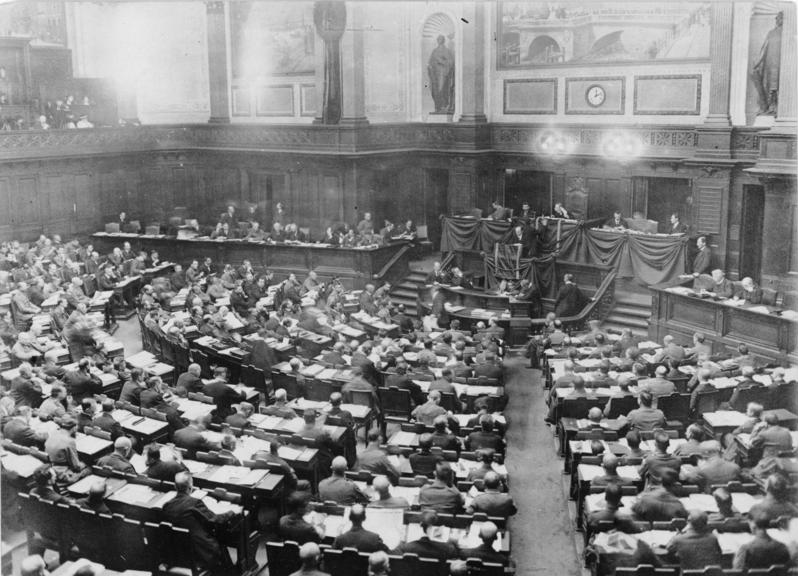
Reich Congress of Workers' and Soldiers' Councils in the Prussian Landtag in Berlin on 16 December 1918 during the opening speech of executive council member and representative of the Revolutionary Stewards, Richard Müller

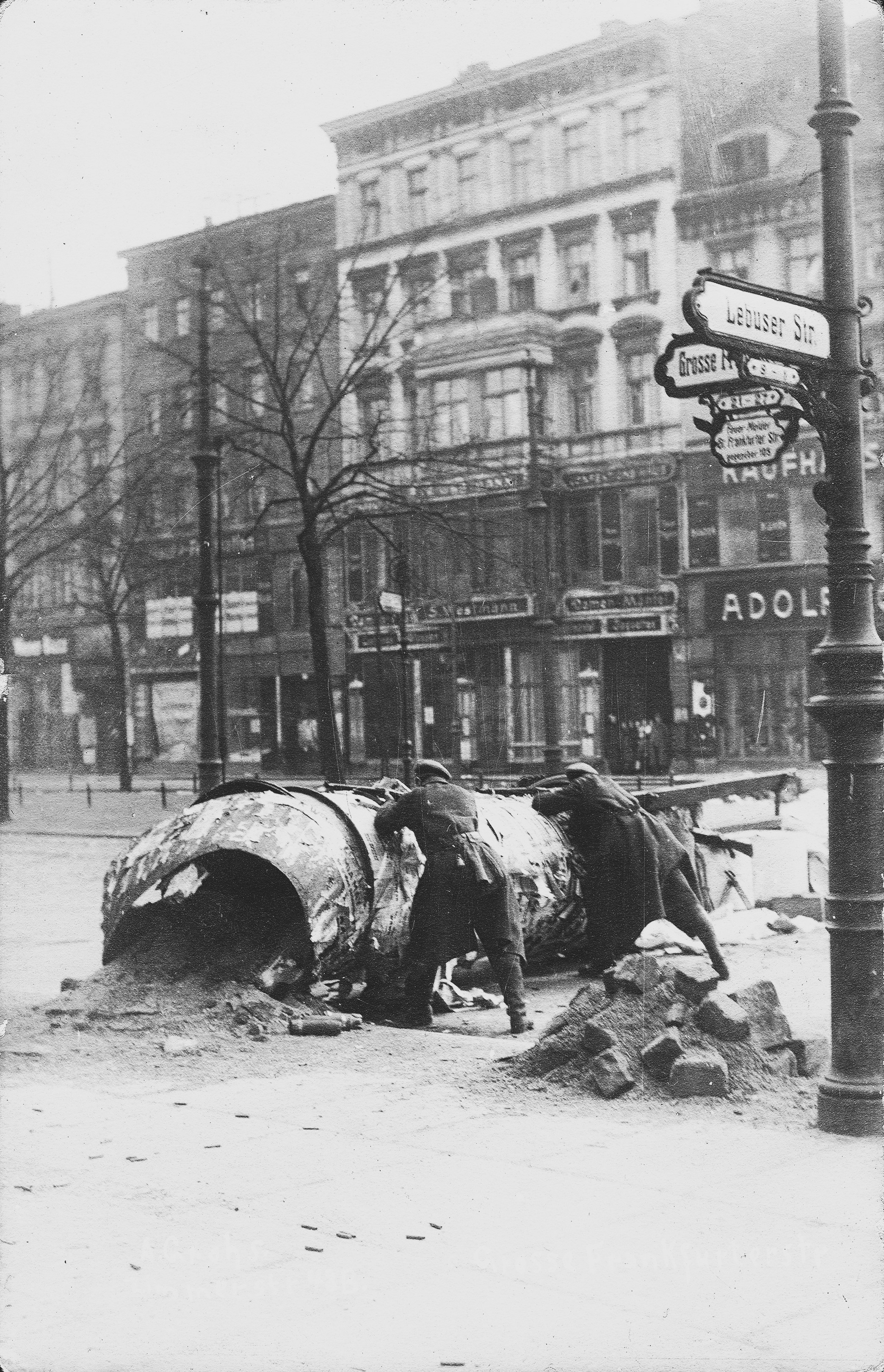
Spartacist uprising, January 1919: barricade fighting in Berlin.

=== November 1918: revolution ===
In the early days of November 1918, the Revolutionary Stewards were one of the few political groups demanding an end to the monarchy. In addition, unlike the Majority SPD led by Friedrich Ebert, they were also in favour of "socialisation" of industries and government by workers' and soldiers' councils rather than a parliamentary system. On 2 November 1918 there was a meeting of the Executive Committee of the Stewards, also attended by Liebknecht, which voted 21 to 19 against initiating revolutionary action on 4 November as the workers were not yet disposed to act. They settled on 11 November. In Berlin, the Stewards numbered around 80 to 100. The core group numbered only about a dozen.

On 8 November, driven by events to accelerate their plan, the Stewards called for a general strike in Berlin on the next day. The Spartacists, the SPD and the unions supported the call. On 9 November, workers' and soldiers' councils were formed, the headquarters of police was occupied and hundreds of thousands of demonstrators converged on the city centre. Imperial Chancellor Max of Baden announced prematurely that Emperor Wilhelm II had abdicated and handed over his office to Friedrich Ebert. In the afternoon Ebert grudgingly asked the USPD to nominate three ministers for the future government. That evening a group of several hundred followers of the Stewards occupied the Reichstag and held an impromptu debate. They called for the election of soldiers' and workers' councils the next day (one per battalion or 1,000 workers). They were to assemble at "Zirkus Busch" and elect a provisional revolutionary government, the Council of the People's Deputies (Rat der Volksbeauftragten).

In order to keep control of events and against his own anti-revolutionary convictions, Ebert decided that he needed to preempt the workers' councils and thus—whilst the formal head of government—also become the leader of the revolution. On 10 November, the SPD managed to ensure that a majority of the newly elected workers' and (especially) soldiers' councils came from among their own supporters. Meanwhile, the USPD agreed to work with him and share power in the new revolutionary government. Ebert announced the pact between the two socialist parties to the assembled councils who were eager for a unified socialist front and approved the parity of three members each coming from SPD and USPD. However, the Stewards had anticipated that they would fail to prevent the SPD from dominating the Council of the People's Deputies. They therefore called for an Executive Committee (Aktionsausschuss) of the workers' and soldiers' councils to be set up in parallel to the Council of the People's Deputies and that would be under the control of the Stewards. Its powers were to be left deliberately vague. Emil Barth, who was presiding over the assembly, then made a tactical error by giving a long-winded speech rather than moving directly to the vote. Listeners, including Ebert, were able to deduce the Stewards' intentions from what Barth said. Ebert made another speech, declaring that the committee was superfluous, but if it was to be set up, it must be made up equally of SPD and USPD just like the Council of the People's Deputies. When Barth said that no SPD delegate must sit on the committee, the assembly exploded with protest, in particular from the soldiers' councils. After an interruption, the session continued and Barth announced an Executive Committee of 20 members: ten soldiers and ten workers. Half of the latter would be supporters of the SPD, half supporters of the Stewards. The soldiers's delegates were to be elected on 11 November. The Stewards had lost.

=== December 1918: congress of councils and Christmas crisis ===
From 16 to 21 December 1918, the Reich Congress of Workers' and Soldiers' Councils (Reichsrätekongress or Reichsversammlung der Arbeiter- und Soldatenräte) met in Berlin inside the Prussian Landtag building. There was one delegate for every 200,000 citizens and 100,000 soldiers. Out of 514 delegates, around 300 came from the SPD, about 100 from the USPD (of which ten were Spartacists) and the rest were liberals, not associated with any party or members of independent revolutionary groups. The Congress took some important decisions (in each case with a broad majority):

- It rejected a proposal by the USPD to retain the council system as the basis for a socialist republic and to give the councils the supreme legislative and executive power.
- It approved a proposal by the SPD to vest legislative and executive power with the Council of the People's Deputies until a National Assembly could make more permanent arrangements. Moreover, the Executive Committee created on 10 November was replaced with a Central Council (Zentralrat). The latter was made up of SPD members only as the USPD boycotted its election because the new institution would have no legislative powers.
- Elections for a National Assembly were set for 19 January 1919, the earliest possible date.

However, the Congress also passed two resolutions that went against the interests of the SPD leadership. First, it called on the Council of the People's Deputies to begin immediately with the socialisation of all "suitable" industries, especially mining. Secondly, it approved the Hamburg Points, which called for the election of officers, for disciplinary power to lie with the soldiers' councils, no insignia of rank and no rank off-duty. However, the demands were anathema to the leadership of the military, in particular those relating to the position of the soldiers' councils vis-à-vis the regular officer corps.

The last two decisions of the Congress underscored a division regarding short-term changes to the economy, the bureaucracy and the military between a broad-based consensus across party lines of the democratic-socialist movement on the one hand and the leadership of the SPD and the military on the other. The SPD members of the Council of the People's Deputies consequently dragged their feet over the implementation of the last two points, causing increasing resentment and anger among the labour movement and its more radical representatives like the Spartacists and the Stewards.

On 29 December, the only representative of the Revolutionary Stewards, Emil Barth (also a member of the USPD), and two further representatives of the USPD left the Council of the People's Deputies in protest against the events of the Christmas crisis (Weihnachtskämpfe), in which government troops were deployed against the Volksmarinedivision, a unit of leftist revolutionary soldiers established on 11 November 1918. The fighting caused many on the left to accuse the leadership of the SPD of having betrayed the revolution.

Although the Revolutionary Stewards supported the idea of a council republic rather than a parliamentary democracy, they rejected the Communist Party of Germany (KPD), founded on 30/31 December 1918, which pursued the same goal. This was because the KPD was not ready to accept the five conditions set by Richard Müller on behalf of the Revolutionary Stewards: withdrawal of the anti-voting decision, a program committee with equal representation, condemnation of "putschism", taking part in party publicity and abandonment of the additional name "Spartacus League".

=== January 1919: January uprising ===
In the atmosphere of outrage created on the left by the military action against the Volksmarinedivision—which Liebknecht called "Ebert's bloody Christmas"—the Stewards were among the initiators of the Spartacus Uprising (Spartakusaufstand) in January 1919. Emil Eichhorn, a member of the USPD and head of the Berlin police, had refused to act against the revolting sailors during the Christmas crisis. Some of his men from the Security Police (Sicherheitspolizei) had even actively supported the uprising. Paul Hirsch, Prussian Minister of the Interior, therefore dismissed Eichhorn on 4 January. Notwithstanding their differences, the Stewards, the USPD and the Spartacists called for a protest demonstration in support of Eichhorn.

On 5 January 1919, around half a million people gathered at a mass demonstration in Berlin. Armed demonstrators stormed the Berlin newspaper quarter, where they occupied the editorial office of the SPD paper Vorwärts as well as other publishing buildings. The main railway stations were also seized. The force of the popular response caught the organizers by surprise. At a meeting at the police headquarters attended by Eichhorn, 70 Stewards, ten members of the USPD led by Georg Ledebour, three representatives of the soldiers, and Liebknecht and Wilhelm Pieck for the KDP, the men were caught up in the momentum of the hour and lost sight of the real situation, overestimating the support for their actions from the military in the Berlin area. They voted 80 to six to topple the government. The Stewards' representative Paul Scholze, Karl Liebknecht (KPD) and Georg Ledebour (USPD) now signed a proclamation demanding the toppling of Ebert's government. They wanted to prevent elections to the National Assembly and to continue with the revolution. A "provisionary revolutionary committee" was set up. It numbered 53 members, including Scholze, Liebknecht and Ledebour, and declared that it had taken over the government. Its only action, though, was to issue a call for another demonstration on the next day.

The masses reassembled on Sunday, 6 January. However, no orders came from the revolutionary leaders. In isolated actions, the government printing office and a telegraph office were seized. No one occupied the government buildings—whilst some armed supporters of the Ebert government gathered around the Reich Chancellery. The masses started to disperse and by midnight the centre of Berlin had been vacated. During the day, the committee had relocated to the Marstall, the barracks of the Volksmarinedivision, but had been asked to leave and thus returned to the police headquarters.

There they remained, when Ebert accepted mediation by those of the USPD who had left the Council of the People's Deputies in late December. Ebert had just one condition: the occupation of the newspaper buildings must end. On 7 January, the revolutionary committee declined. Whilst negotiations continued, Ebert prepared for a military response. He made Gustav Noske, since the withdrawal of the USPD a member of the Council of the People's Deputies, the military commander-in-chief and rallied the regular troops of the Berlin area to his cause.

On the orders of Ebert, government forces commanded by Noske crushed the uprising between 9 and 12 January. Its defeat came after intense struggles, especially around the Berlin police headquarters and the publishing building of Vorwärts in which a reported 165 people lost their lives. The dead included several prisoners who were summarily executed, some after they had approached the government forces under a flag of truce.

== Decline of the Revolutionary Stewards ==
The January uprising led to the dissolution of the Revolutionary Stewards' network, because many of its members took part in the uprising while others such as Richard Müller opposed it. The organization of the Revolutionary Stewards dissolved, though many of its members continued to work in the council structures. The struggles, at times approaching the level of civil war, which took place in some regions of Germany in the following months put the council movement increasingly on the defensive. Various calls for regional council republics, for example in Bremen or, more famously, the Bavarian Soviet Republic, were suppressed with military force by regular armed forces and right-wing Freikorps troops by mid-1919.

Under the Weimar Constitution which came into force in August 1919, the republic became a pluralistic parliamentary democracy. After the defeat of the council movement, the Revolutionary Stewards still had influence and called for and helped execute a general strike against the right-wing nationalist and anti-democratic Kapp Putsch of March 1920. The strike brought the economy to a virtual stand-still and, together with the refusal of the bureaucracy to cooperate with the new government, caused the putsch to fail in a matter of days. However, in some parts of Germany, the striking workers refused to return to work and offered armed resistance to the legitimate government of President Ebert and Chancellor Bauer. The most significant of these events was the Ruhr Uprising, which was crushed by the Reichswehr and Freikorps in April 1920.

After 1920, the former Stewards did not play a notable role in the German labour movement any more. Many former activists became members of the KPD, especially after the left wing of the USPD merged with the KPD when the USPD split at the end of 1920. Occasionally it operated under the alternate name "United Communist Party of Germany" (VKPD). Other Stewards remained in the USPD and future related groups, or joined the SPD again, after a part of the remaining USPD returned to the SPD in 1922. Towards the end of 1922, the core of the local structures of the USPD in Berlin, which continued to exist as a small party, was composed largely of former Revolutionary Stewards.

Some Stewards who continued to follow a party-independent "antiauthoritarian" council model joined the anarcho-syndicalist Free Workers' Union of Germany (FAUD).

== Prominent members ==
- Richard Müller
- Ernst Däumig
- Emil Barth
- Paul Scholze
