= German strike of January 1918 =

Political strike in Germany against the First World War

The German strike of January 1918 was a strike against World War I which spread across the German Empire. It lasted from 25 January to 1 February 1918. It is known as the "Januarstreik", as distinct from the "Jännerstreik" which preceded it spreading across Austria-Hungary between January 3 and 25, 1918. The strike began in Berlin on 28 January and spread across the rest of Germany, but finally collapsed. The strike was caused by food shortages, war weariness and the October Revolution in Russia, which raised the hopes of revolutionary Marxists in Germany. The strike was conceived by the Independent Social Democratic Party of Germany or USPD, whose left wing, the Spartacus League was now agitating for political revolution in order to end the war. While the strikes were triggered by the earlier "Jännerstreik" in Austria, the widespread response in Germany signaled the USPD's growing importance in German politics. At its height the strike involved over a million people in important industrial regions such as Kiel, Hamburg, Mannheim, and Augsburg, only being shut down when the military arrested or impressed the strike leaders, sending them to the front lines.

== Background ==
From 1916 onward, illegal labor strikes in Germany had begun to increase in occurrence due to eroding wages as well as food and energy shortages. For example in June 1916 over 50,000 laborers in Berlin went on strike to protest the jailing of Karl Liebknecht. In April 1917 the government responded with military force after workers in Berlin and Leipzig rioted over bread rationing. The increasingly dire living standards of German workers made political parties such as the USPD, which opposed the war, increasingly more appealing. The USPD facilitated the creation of "workers' councils", which, while dissimilar to their soviet counterparts in that they were not dedicated to radicalism or revolutionary activity, still promoted striking and other popular agitation. These workers' councils had their origins in the 1916 Auxiliary National Services Law passed by the German government which allowed for workers employed in companies with more than 50 people to create committees to negotiate on wages and conditions. Representatives from these auxiliary committees, as well as representatives from other formal and informal workers groups joined the USPD backed workers councils throughout Germany.

By early January 1918, Spartacists were distributing flyers calling for a general strike but had no set date or agreement from the USPD. Richard Müller, leader of the Revolutionary Stewards concurred that labor was ready for an organized strike and proposed calling one at a joint USPD meeting in mid-January. At the meeting of USPD delegates and representatives, the majority agreed with leaders such as Hugo Haase that a general strike was necessary, while a minority, including Heinrich Ströbel opposed the strike. However, the party would not commit to presenting a call to strike in writing. However, because the Stewards represented the workers and had the influence to call strikes on the factory level, it was up to them if and when strikes would be called. On 27 January Müller, acting as the Steward leader, convinced the Berlin Turners to unanimously declare a strike. Spartacist leaflets began circulating stating "Monday, January 28 the general strike begins!".

== Berlin ==
On 28 January Berlin's Metalworkers' Union or Deutscher Metallarbeiter-Verband (DMV) which was staffed with local representatives and USPD members, was demanding peace without annexations, food relief, an end to conscription, and pro-democracy reforms. The full list of demands was written up by Müller and included:

- peace without annexation or indemnities
- worker representation in peace negotiations
- food supply improvements
- ending the state of siege
- restoration of the freedom of speech and assembly
- ending labor by women and children
- ending military control of factories
- freeing political prisoners
- democratization of the German state, including universal suffrage for all adults 20 and older

Additionally the left wing of the USPD, or Spartacists, including leaders Karl Liebknecht and Rosa Luxemburg demanded a global revolution.

400,000 workers went on strike primarily in the munitions and metal plants. Within each factory in Berlin meetings and elections were held with revolutionary delegates being elected by significant majorities. By noon 414 of the elected delegates were meeting and being presented with Müller's program. In turn they elected an eleven member action committee and invited delegates from the USPD and SPD to represent the two main socialist parties. The USPD delegates included Hugo Haase, Georg Ledebour, and Wilhelm Dittmann, while the SPD delegates were Friedrich Ebert, Philipp Scheidemann, and Otto Braun. The meeting was however interrupted by a false panic over rumors of an imminent police raid after which the SPD delegates left. By nightfall the government had enacted a ban on factory meetings and strike councils, despite the number of strikers now reaching half a million.

The next day on 29 January the Action Committee nominated representatives to meet with the Under Secretary for the Minister of the Interior of Germany, but were only allowed to meet with a civil servant who informed them the Action Committee had been declared illegal and that they would be subject to criminal prosecution. While strikers continued to confront the police, the military prepared to shut down the strikers, putting up red posters that notified of a heightened state of siege, setting up courts-martial, and drafting NCOs to support the police. The Action Committee proceeded to publish leaflets calling for a strengthening of the strike and an open air meeting in Treptow Park on the 31st.

At the meeting in Treptow Park Ebert called for the workers to continue supporting the war effort, after which he was denounced by the strikers. Dittmann was arrested at the meeting for publicly calling for subversion and sentenced to five years imprisonment.

On 1 February the military informed the strikers it would impose martial law. Meanwhile the SPD representatives in the Action Committee declared that work must restart soon. The Imperial government quickly dissolved a 414 member delegate action committee the strikers had elected, and then conscripted up to 50,000 of the strikers. The Action Committee then conceded defeat, issuing a call to return to work on 3 February.

== Aftermath ==
After the strike was called off 50,000 workers were conscripted to the front and the leadership of the Spartacists, including Leo Jogiches, was arrested. Additionally, the Spartacists took as a lesson that they needed to focus on winning the loyalty of the German soldiers as well as that of the workers.
