= Richard Müller (socialist) =

German socialist and historian (1880–1943)

Richard Müller (9 December 1880 – 11 May 1943) was a German socialist, metal worker, union shop steward, and later historian. Trained as a lathe-operator, Müller later became an industrial unionist and organizer of mass-strikes against World War I. In 1918 he was a leading figure of the council movement in the German Revolution. In the 1920s he wrote a three-volume history of the German Revolution.

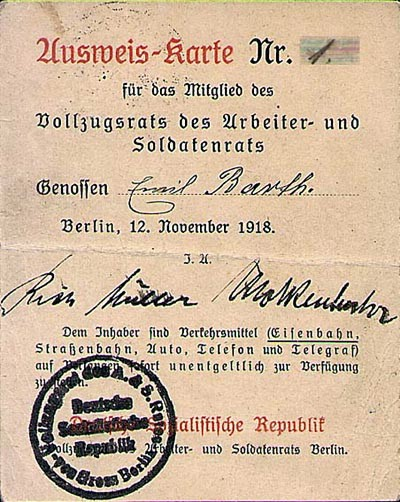
Passport Nr. 1 for Emil Barth, member of the Berlin Executive Council (highest-ranking worker´s council in the German Revolution); with signatures from Richard Müller and Brutus Molkenbuhr

== Early life ==
Born in a small village called Weira in the Grand Duchy of Saxe-Weimar-Eisenach, in what today is the German state of Thuringia, Müller left home and started working in the metal-industry after his father died in 1896. He became a lathe operator and around 1906 a member of the Deutscher Metallarbeiter-Verband (DMV), the German metalworkers union. Around the same time he became a member of the Social Democratic Party of Germany (Sozialdemokratische Partei Deutschlands - SPD) which by then was the biggest socialist party in Europe.

== World War I and the Anti-War Movement ==
In 1914 Müller was chairman of the agitational commission of the Berlin branch of the Metalworkers Union. Müller represented around 9,000 lathe-operators in the city of Berlin. When the First World War started, the social-democrats and the union leaders decided to collaborate with the imperial government and to support the war-movement. The lathe-operators, however maintained a left wing viewpoint and criticized this nationalist turn of the socialist and trade union movement and started wildcat strikes.

From 1916 to 1918, these strikes became a mass-movement which substantially challenged the political support for the world-war. Müller, as the head of an organization called the "Revolutionary Stewards", was the leading figure behind these mass-strikes. Müller was arrested and drafted into the military three times, but he always managed to find a way out and return to his political work.

After the January-Strike in 1918 a big wave of repression hit the anti-war-movement. Müller and his circle decided to plan an armed uprising within the next months. Preparations began quite slowly, but gained speed in the fall of 1918, when the military catastrophe for Germany became more and more obvious to the public. Müller and the shop-stewards started secret conferences that involved Karl Liebknecht and his spartacist league but also some representatives of the Independent Social Democratic Party of Germany (USPD) who had split from SPD because they opposed the war. Liebknecht in these meetings pushed for action, but Müller and his comrades had a more pragmatic way of organizing things. In order to secure the success of the revolution, they wanted to avoid premature actions at all costs.

== German Revolution ==
Although the Berlin Coalition of Müller's revolutionary stewards, the spartacists and the USPD was the best-prepared group, the Revolution itself started spontaneously as a mutiny within the German war-fleet. When news about these events came to Berlin, the revolutionaries sped up their preparations and called for action on 9 November. The shop-stewards, who were the only leftist group with a widespread network in the factories, called for a general strike and armed demonstrations formed to enter the city center.

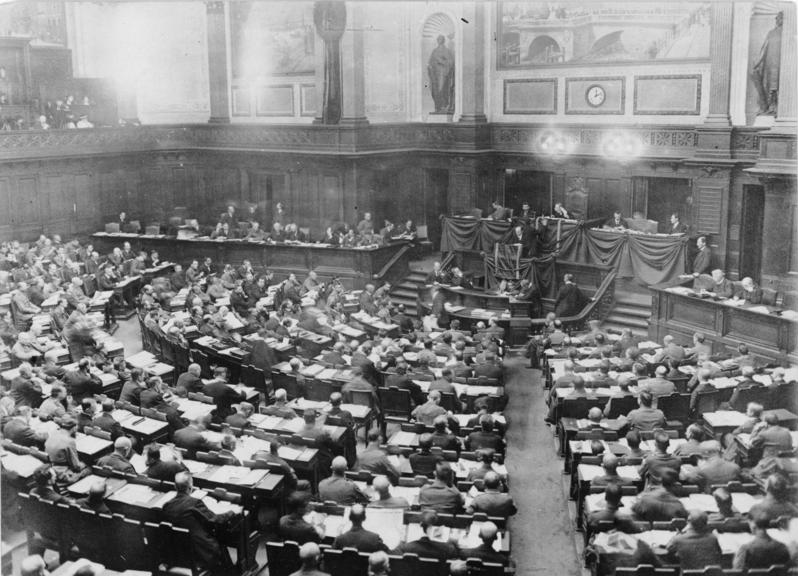
First Congress of the Worker´s and Soldier´s Councils of Germany, December 1918 - opening speech by Richard Müller

The revolutionaries took Berlin by surprise, almost no resistance was put against their actions. One day after the revolution, Müller became chairman of the "Executive Council of Workers' and Soldiers' Councils" (Vollzugsrat). By then this was the highest organ of the newly declared "Socialist republic of Germany", so that in theory Müller was head of state. But in fact power concentrated within the "Council of People's Representatives" (Rat der Volksbeauftragten), a revolutionary government dominated by Friedrich Ebert, leader of the Social Democrats. Müller and the more radical forces in the executive council lost power very quickly. They had to hand over executive powers to the Council of People's Representatives only two weeks after the revolution, and in the summer of 1919 Vollzugsrat was shut down by force after several strikes calling for socialization of core-industries were turned down as well. These strikes in the spring of 1919 were the biggest mass-mobilisation of the German council movement in which Müller was a leading figure. Together with his friend Ernst Däumig he wrote a very influential conception how council-communism could work in practise. By then, the periodical "The Workers-Council" (Der Arbeiter-Rat), was the theoretical organ of the council movement and Müller was one of its main authors. During the strike Movement in March 1919 Richard Müller was strike-leader for the larger Berlin area and tried to build a united front of all working class parties, but failed.

== Communist Party ==
When the Communist Party of Germany (KPD) was founded by Karl Liebknecht and Rosa Luxemburg on New Year's Eve of 1918, they tried to integrate Müller and the revolutionary stewards because of their credibility among workers and their widespread network within the factories. Although Müller was part of the socialist left and sympathizing with Liebknecht, he and his group decided not to join the party. The reason was its intention to boycott the upcoming elections for the national assembly and to leave the major unions in order to form their own communist union movement.

After the KPD turned away from this political course, Müller and many of his former comrades joined the party in October 1920. By then, the USPD had split and the left majority altogether had found its way to Communism. By then the council movement was already dead and political parties once again were the main organisation of the socialist movement.

Within the KPD, Müller became Leader of the "Reichsgewerkschaftszentrale", the KPD's central on union affairs. Müller was responsible for the communist agitation and politics within the German unions. He lost this job in March 1921 when he criticised a failed communist uprising in Thuringia. In his views the action was premature and caused by police provocation. But the KPD central committee did not like independent critics within the party and tried to get rid of Müller. Due to an Intervention of Lenin and Trotsky on the Third World-Congress of the Communist International they had to accept the re-integration of Müller and other critics into the KPD. But when fights within the party started over again later, Müller and his faction lost support from Moscow and left the party. He then joined the Communist Working Group, led by Paul Levi.

== Historian ==
After he was forced out of the communist movement, Müller wrote an extensive history of the German Revolution. The first volume "Vom Kaiserreich zur Republik" (From Empire to republic) was published in 1924. A year later two other volumes followed: "Die Novemberrevolution" (The November-Revolution) and "Bürgerkrieg in Deutschland" (Civil War in Germany). Müller's writings were the only contemporary Marxist history of the German Revolution. In addition, they presented a unique collection of sources that Müller had collected during his political career. But in academia, Müller's conclusions were mostly ignored because of his Marxist point of view. Paradoxically, Müller's works were widely used as a source in almost every standard account of the historical events, since Müller gave the most detailed inside-view on the revolutionary movement. Prominent examples are the works of Arthur Rosenberg and Sebastian Haffner, two German historians who not only used Müller as a source but also discussed his conclusions. Müller's writings were re-discovered in the 1960s by the German student movement and had a strong influence on its view on the German Revolution.

== Retreat to private life ==
By the end of the 1920s Müller was an active member of the "Deutscher Industrieverband" (DIV), a small communist but anti-Stalinist union without party affiliation. Little is known about his activity there and Müller left the Organisation around 1929. Afterwards he became an entrepreneur in real estate. Originally, he wanted to become a publisher and founded a company called "Phoebus" in order to promote his third book. But after some time, the firm changed its field of operation and went into construction works. Phoebus built state-subsidized homes for working-class families and Richard Müller acted very successfully as director of the enterprise. By 1930 he had become a millionaire; some time later he left the business and retired. Little is known about his late years; he did not seem to be active in any kind of anti-fascist action, at least nothing like this is documented. Müller died on 11 May 1943 in Berlin.

== Writings ==
- Vom Kaiserreich zur Republik; Wien: Malik, 1924–1925
  - Volume 1: Ein Beitrag zur Geschichte der revolutionären Arbeiterbewegung während des Weltkrieges.
  - Volume 2: Die Novemberrevolution. Wien (Malik-Verlag) 1924, Cover by John Heartfield.
- Der Bürgerkrieg in Deutschland. Geburtswehen der Republik. Berlin, Phöbus-Verlag, 1925

reprints: Olle & Wolter, Berlin 1979 (Kritische Bibliothek der Arbeiterbewegung, Texte Nr. 3, 4 und 5) and: Richard Müller, Eine Geschichte der Novemberrevolution, Berlin 2011 (all three works in one volume.)

== Literature ==
- Ralf Hoffrogge: Working-Class Politics in the German Revolution, Richard Müller, the Revolutionary Shop Stewards and the Origins of the Council Movement, Brill Publishers, Leiden 2014, ISBN 9789004219212.
- Ralf Hoffrogge: "From Unionism to Workers’ Councils: The Revolutionary Shop Stewards in Germany 1914–1918", in: Immanuel Ness, Dario Azzellini (Ed): Ours to Master and to Own: Worker´s Control from the Commune to the Present, Haymarket Books Chicago 2011.
- Ralf Hoffrogge: Richard Müller: Der Mann hinter der Novemberrevolution, Karl-Dietz-Verlag Berlin 2008, ISBN 978-3-320-02148-1
- Chaja Boebel/Lothar Wentzel (Hg.): Streiken gegen den Krieg. Die Bedeutung der Massenstreiks in der Metallindustrie vom Januar 1918, VSA-Verlag, Hamburg 2008, ISBN 978-3-89965-320-5 .
- Ingo Materna: Der Vollzugsrat der Berliner Arbeiter- und Soldatenräte 1918/19, Dietz-Verlag Berlin 1978.
- Dietmar Lange: Massenstreik und Schießbefehl: Generalstreik und Märzkämpfe in Berlin 1919, Edition Assemblage, Berlin 2012.
