= Prussian Revolutionary cabinet =

4-month Provisional Government of Prussia (1918–19)

Prussian Revolutionary Cabinet
- Cabinet of the Free State of Prussia
- 1918–1919
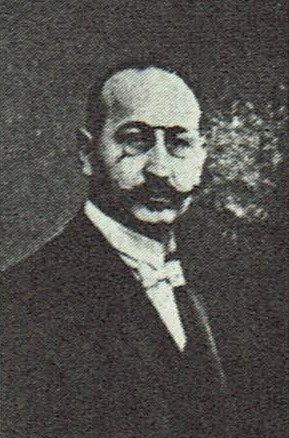
- Co-President Hirsch
- Date formed: 14 November 1918
- Date dissolved: 25 March 1919 (4 months, 1 week and 4 days)

People and organisations
- Minister President: Paul Hirsch; Heinrich Ströbel

History
- Predecessor: Hertling cabinet
- Successor: Hirsch cabinet

The Prussian Revolutionary cabinet was the provisional state government of Prussia from 14 November 1918 to 25 March 1919. It was based on a coalition of Majority Social Democrats (MSPD) and Independent Social Democrats (USPD), as was the Council of the People's Deputies, which was formed at the Reich level. The Prussian cabinet was revolutionary because it was not formed on the basis of the previous Prussian constitution of 1848/1850.

The cabinet was led by Paul Hirsch of the MSPD. One MSPD and one USPD man were assigned to each department. The USPD members left the cabinet on 4 January 1919. It was replaced by a new cabinet after the Prussian State Assembly was elected on 26 January 1919.

== History ==
The Kingdom of Prussia was by far the most important member state in the monarchical German Empire and remained so after the German revolution of 1918–1919. Prussia and the German Empire were linked to each other in many ways: the German Chancellor was also the Prussian Prime Minister, and many state secretaries were Prussian ministers. Prussia was also the dominant power in the German Bundesrat, the body representing the German states.

On 9 November 1918, the last Imperial Chancellor, Max von Baden, announced prematurely that William II, Germany's Emperor and King, had abdicated. Max unconstitutionally transferred the office of German Chancellor to Friedrich Ebert, the leader of the Majority Social Democrats. On 10 November, Ebert formed the Council of the People's Deputies (German: Rat der Volksbeauftragten) as a revolutionary transitional body at the federal level and became one of two chairmen of the council.

Since Max von Baden was not Prussian Prime Minister, he was unable to give Ebert the premiership at the same time. The majority of the Prussian State Ministry wanted to resign on 8 November, but after his abdication was declared the next day, the King could no longer accept their resignations. The Prussian cabinet therefore remained in office, as did the state secretaries at the federal level.

On 9 November, Reich Chancellor Ebert instructed the leader of the MSPD in Prussia Paul Hirsch to ensure peace and order. The Prussian Interior Minister Bill Drews confirmed the instruction with his own power of attorney to Hirsch. According to historian Ernst Rudolf Huber, Hirsch briefly became "Federal and Prussian State Commissioner".

== Cabinet members ==
Portfolio	Minister	Took office	Left office	Party
Minister Presidents	Paul Hirsch	14 November 1918	25 March 1919	SPD
Minister Presidents	Heinrich Ströbel	14 November 1918	4 January 1919	USPD
Minister of Finance	Albert Südekum	14 November 1918	25 March 1919	SPD
Minister of Finance	Hugo Simon	14 November 1918	4 January 1919	USPD
Minister of Science	Konrad Haenisch	14 November 1918	25 March 1919	SPD
Minister of Science	Adolph Hoffmann	14 November 1918	4 January 1919	USPD
Minister of Justice	Kurt Rosenfeld	14 November 1918	4 January 1919	USPD
Minister of Justice	Wolfgang Heine	27 November 1918	25 March 1919	SPD
Minister of Trade	Otto Fischbeck	14 November 1918	25 March 1919	GDD
Minister of Public Works	Wilhelm Hoff	14 November 1918	25 March 1919	N/A
Minister of Interior Affairs	Paul Hirsch	14 November 1918	25 March 1919	SPD
Minister of Interior Affairs	Rudolf Breitscheid	16 November 1918	4 January 1919	USPD
Minister of War	Heinrich Scheuch	14 November 1918 (Note: Heinrich Scheuch was the only member of the Hertling cabinet to continue into the Prussian Revolutionary Cabinet.)	2 January 1919	N/A
Minister of War	Walther Reinhardt	3 January 1919	25 March 1919	N/A
Minister of Agriculture	Otto Braun	14 November 1918	25 March 1919	SPD
Minister of Agriculture	Adolf Hofer	14 November 1918	4 January 1919	USPD
Police Chief of Berlin	Emil Eichhorn	16 November 1918	3 January 1919	USPD
Police Chief of Berlin	Eugen Ernst	4 January 1919	25 March 1919	SPD
Minister of State (without specific area)	Eugen Ernst	16 November 1918	3 January 1919	SPD

== See also ==
- Prussian State Ministry
