= Free State of Prussia =

1918–1947 constituent state of Germany

Free State of Prussia Freistaat Preußen
- State of the Weimar Republic and Nazi Germany
- 1918–1947
- Civil Flag

- The Free State of Prussia within the Weimar Republic in 1925

Anthem
- Freistaat Preußen Marsch "Free State of Prussia March" (1922–1935)
- Capital: Berlin
- Area
  - 1925: 292,695.36 km^{2} (113,010.31 sq mi)
- Population
  - 1925: 38,175,986
- Government
  - Type: Republic
  - Motto: Gott mit uns "God with us"
- Minister President
  - 1918 (first): Friedrich Ebert
  - 1933–1945 (last): Hermann Göring
- Reichsstatthalter
  - 1933–1935: Adolf Hitler
  - 1935–1945: Hermann Göring
- Legislature: State Parliament
  - Upper Chamber: State Council
  - Lower Chamber: House of Representatives
- Historical era: Interwar • World War II
  - German Revolution: 9 November 1918
  - Constitution adopted: 30 November 1920
  - Prussian coup d'état: 20 July 1932
  - Nazi seizure of power: 30 January 1933
  - Formally abolished: 25 February 1947
Preceded by
| Kingdom of Prussia |
Succeeded by
| 1919: Klaipėda Region |
| Territory of the Saar Basin |
| Republic of Gniew |
| 1946: Allied-occupied Germany |
| Polish People's Republic |
| Soviet Union |
- Today part of: Germany; Poland; Russia; Lithuania; Denmark; Czech Republic; Belgium; Netherlands

The Free State of Prussia (German: Freistaat Preußen, pronounced [ˈfʁaɪʃtaːt ˈpʁɔʏsn̩]) was one of the constituent states of the Weimar Republic from 1918 to 1933 and then the German Reich from 1933 to 1945. It was the successor to the Kingdom of Prussia after the defeat of the German Empire in World War I and the overthrow of the German monarchies in the revolution of 1918–1919. Even though most of Germany's post-war territorial losses in Europe had come from its territory, Prussia continued to be the dominant state in Germany during the Weimar Republic as it had been during the Empire. It was home to the federal capital Berlin and had roughly three-fifths of Germany's territory and population. Prussia changed from the authoritarian state it had been and became a parliamentary democracy under its 1920 constitution. During the Weimar period, it was governed almost entirely by pro-democratic parties and was more politically stable than the Republic itself. With only brief interruptions, the Social Democratic Party (SPD) provided the minister president. Its ministers of the Interior, also from the SPD, pushed republican reform of the administration and police, with the result that Prussia was considered a bulwark of democracy within the Weimar Republic.

As a result of the Prussian coup d'état instigated by German Chancellor Franz von Papen in 1932, the Free State was subordinated to the national government and deprived of its independence. After the Nazi Party seized power in 1933, a Prussian government under Hermann Göring continued to function formally until 1945. After the end of the Second World War, Prussia was legally abolished on 25 February 1947 by decree of the Allied Control Council.

== Establishment (1918–1920) ==
=== Revolution of 1918–1919 ===
At the end of October 1918, after it had become clear that Germany faced defeat in World War I, sailors of the High Seas Fleet mutinied at Kiel and sparked the German revolution. They set up a revolutionary workers' and soldiers' council and in early November, began spreading the revolt across Germany. Councils similar to the one in Kiel took power from the existing military, royal and civil authorities with little resistance or bloodshed.

The revolution reached Berlin on Saturday, 9 November. The Revolutionary Stewards and Spartacus League – groups that favoured a soviet-style council republic – called a general strike with the backing of the moderate Majority Social Democratic Party (MSPD). Workers and soldiers established councils and occupied important buildings such as the police headquarters. At midday, Max von Baden, the last chancellor of the German Empire and last minister president of the Kingdom of Prussia, prematurely announced the abdication of Wilhelm II as Emperor of Germany and King of Prussia. He then handed the chancellorship to Friedrich Ebert, the leader of the MSPD. In the afternoon, Philipp Scheidemann, also of the MSPD, proclaimed a republic from the Reichstag building. On the following day, Ebert formed a provisional government called the Council of the People's Deputies. It was made up of three representatives each from the MSPD and the Independent Social Democratic Party (USPD), a more leftist and anti-war group that had broken away from the originally united SPD in 1917.

Ebert charged Paul Hirsch, the MSPD's party leader in the Prussian House of Representatives, with maintaining peace and order in Prussia. The last minister of the interior of the Kingdom of Prussia, Bill Drews, legitimized the transfer of de facto governmental power to Hirsch.

On 12 November 1918, representatives from the Workers' and Soldiers' Councils of Greater Berlin, including Paul Hirsch, Otto Braun (MSPD) and Adolph Hoffmann (USPD) declared the previous government of Prussia deposed and claimed the management of state affairs for themselves. On the same day, they issued instructions that all departments of the state continue their work as usual. A manifesto, "To the Prussian People", stated that their goal was to transform "the old, fundamentally reactionary Prussia [...] into a fully democratic component of the unified People's Republic."

=== Revolutionary cabinet ===
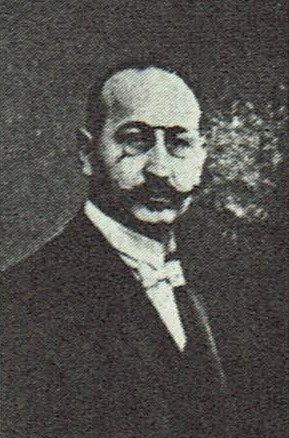
Paul Hirsch, Prussian leader of the Majority SPD (MSPD)

The majority of the Prussian State Ministry wanted to resign on 8 November, but after Emperor Wilhelm's abdication was declared the next day, he could no longer accept their resignations. The Prussian cabinet therefore remained in office, as did the state secretaries in the national government.

On 13 November, the new government confiscated the royal property and placed it under the Ministry of Finance. The following day, the MSPD and USPD formed the Prussian revolutionary cabinet along the lines of the MSPD-USPD coalition at the national level. It included Paul Hirsch, Eugen Ernst and Otto Braun of the MSPD and Heinrich Ströbel, Adolph Hoffmann and Kurt Rosenfeld of the USPD. Almost all government departments were under ministers from both parties. Hirsch and Ströbel became joint chairmen of the cabinet. Unaffiliated ministers or ministers belonging to different political camps were also included, such as the Minister of War, initially Heinrich Schëuch, then from January 1919 Walther Reinhardt. The narrower, decisive political cabinet, however, included only politicians from the two workers' parties. Since the leadership qualities of the two chairmen were comparatively weak, it was mainly Otto Braun and Adolph Hoffmann who set the tone in the provisional government.

=== Political change and its limits ===
On 15 November, the Prussian House of Lords (Herrenhaus) was abolished and the House of Representatives dissolved. The replacement of political elites, however, remained limited during the early years. In many cases, the former royal district administrators (Landräte) continued to hold office as if there had been no revolution. Complaints against them by the workers' councils were either dismissed or ignored by Interior Minister Wolfgang Heine (MSPD). When conservative district administrators themselves requested to be dismissed, they were asked to stay on in order to maintain peace and order.

On 23 December, the government issued an administrative order for the election of a constitutional assembly. Universal, free and secret suffrage for both women and men replaced the old Prussian three-class franchise. At the municipal level, however, it took eight months before the existing governmental bodies were replaced by democratically legitimized ones. Deliberations concerning a fundamental reform of property relations in the countryside, in particular the breaking up of large landholdings, did not bear fruit. The manor districts that were the political power base of the large landowners remained in place.

Minister of Culture Adolph Hoffmann abolished religious instruction as a first step in a push towards the separation of church and state. The move triggered considerable unrest in Catholic areas of Prussia and revived memories of Bismarck's 1870s Kulturkampf ("cultural conflict") against the Catholic Church. At the end of December 1919, MSPD Minister Konrad Haenisch rescinded Hoffmann's decree. In a letter to Felix von Hartmann, the cardinal of Cologne, Minister President Hirsch assured him that Hoffmann's provisions for ending clerical supervision of schools had been illegal because they had not been voted on in the cabinet. More strongly than any other government measures, Hoffmann's socialist cultural policies turned large segments of the population against the revolution.

In late December 1918, bloody fighting broke out on the streets of Berlin between units of the German army called in by Friedrich Ebert and members of the People's Navy Division (Volksmarinedivision), who were resisting a reduction in the unit's size and demanding back pay. The USPD, in protest against the MSPD's use of military force, withdrew from the government in both Prussia and at the national level. When Hirsch dismissed Emil Eichhorn (USPD) as Berlin's police chief because he had ostensibly supported the People's Navy Division, it triggered the failed Spartacist uprising of 5–12 January 1919, an attempt to turn the direction of the revolution towards the founding a council (soviet) republic. An estimated 150 to 200 lives were lost in the uprising.

=== Separatist tendencies and the threat of dissolution ===
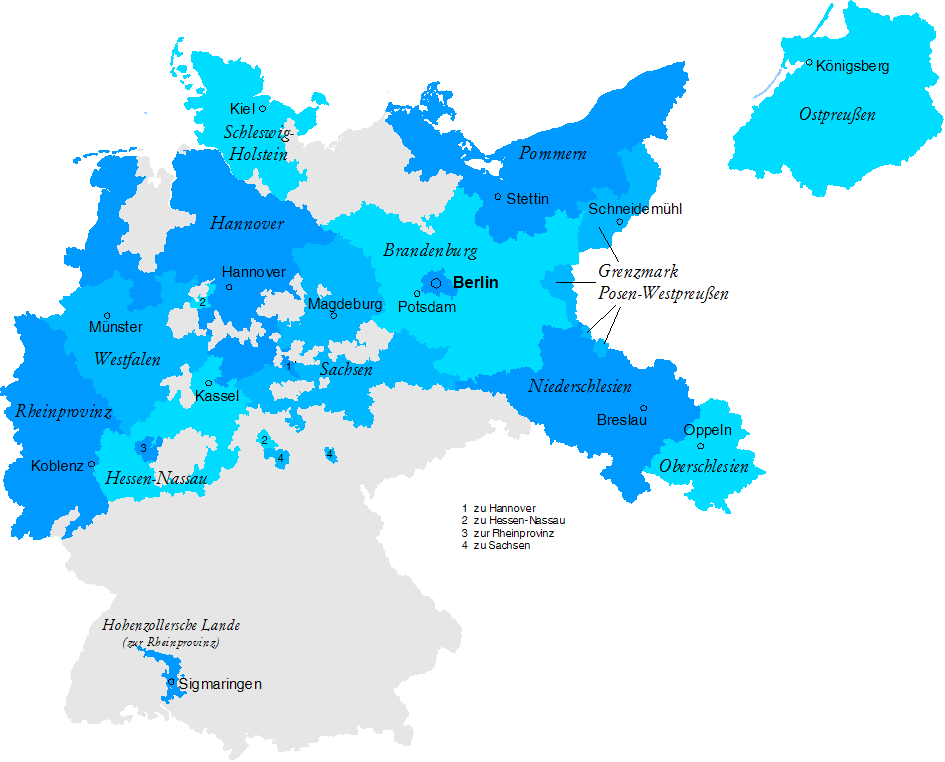
The provinces of Prussia in 1925. (Ostpreußen=East Prussia; Pommern=Pomerania; Sachsen=Saxony; Niederschlesien=Lower Silesia; Oberschlesien=Upper Silesia)

Prussia's continued existence as a state was by no means assured in the aftermath of the revolution. In the Rhine Province, the advisory council of the Catholic Centre Party, fearing a dictatorship of the proletariat, on 4 December 1918 called for the formation of a Rhineland-Westphalian republic independent of Prussia. In the Province of Hanover, 600,000 people signed an appeal for territorial autonomy. In Silesia too, there were efforts to form an independent state. In the eastern provinces, a revolt broke out at Christmas 1918 with the aim of restoring a Polish state. The movement soon encompassed the entire Province of Posen and eventually took on the character of a guerrilla war.

Even for many supporters of the Republic, Prussian dominance seemed a dangerous burden. Hugo Preuss, author of the draft version of the Weimar Constitution, originally envisaged breaking Prussia into smaller states. Given Prussian dominance in the former empire, there was sympathy for the idea. Otto Landsberg (MSPD) of the Council of the People's Deputies commented, "Prussia occupied its position with the sword, and that sword is broken. If Germany is to live, Prussia in its present form must die."

The new socialist government of Prussia was opposed any changes in the state's composition. On 23 January 1919, participants at an emergency meeting of the central council and the provisional government spoke out against dissolution. With the Centre Party abstaining, the State Assembly (see next section) adopted a resolution against a possible breakup. Friedrich Ebert was one of the few members of the Council of the People's Deputies who supported the idea. Most, however, saw it as the first step toward the secession of the Rhineland from Germany.

The mood in Prussia was more uncertain. In December 1919, the State Assembly passed a resolution by 210 votes to 32 that stated: "As the largest of the German states, Prussia views its first duty to be an attempt to see whether the creation of a unified German nation can now be achieved."

=== State Assembly and coalition government ===
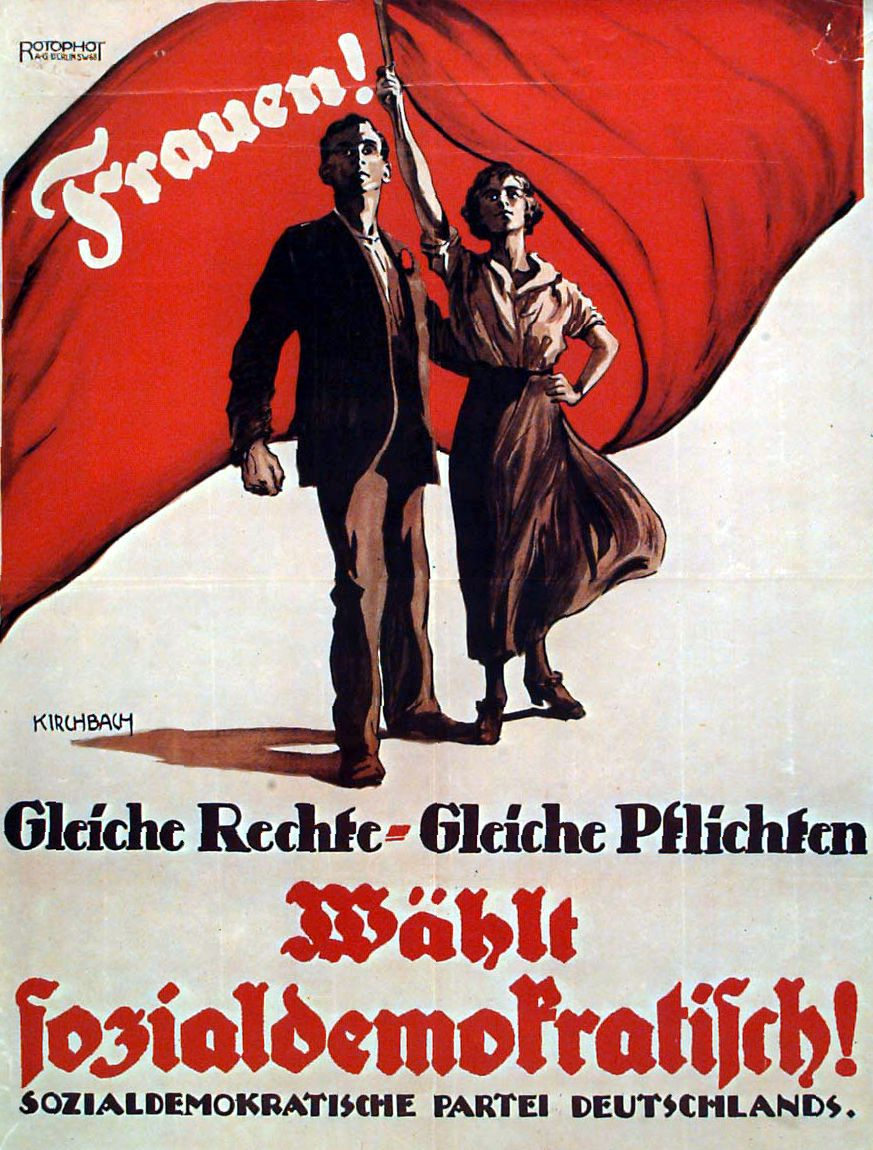
SPD poster for the 1919 election to the constitutional Prussian State Assembly. It reads: "Women! Equal rights. Equal duties. Vote Social Democratic!"

On 26 January 1919, one week after the 1919 German federal election, an election was held for the Prussian State Assembly, which was to write a new constitution for Prussia. Reaching out to female voters, who were going to the polls for the first time, played an important role in the campaign. In Catholic regions of the state, Hoffmann's anti-clerical school program helped the Centre Party to mobilize its voter base. The MSPD emerged as the strongest party, followed by the Centre and the German Democratic Party (DDP). The Assembly met for the first time on 13 March 1919, during the final days of the violent Berlin March battles and the Ruhr uprising.

1919 Landtag Election (parties that won seats)
| Party | Pct. of votes | Seats |
|---|---|---|
| MSPD | 36.4 | 145 |
| Centre | 22.2 | 93 |
| DDP | 16.2 | 65 |
| DNVP | 11.2 | 48 |
| USPD | 7.4 | 24 |
| DVP | 5.7 | 23 |
| DHP | 0.5 | 2 |
| SHBLD | 0.4 | 1 |

On 20 March, the Assembly passed a law for the provisional ordering of the state's powers. It transferred all previous rights of the Prussian king, including his role as the highest authority of the Protestant church, to the Ministry of State, with the exception of his right to adjourn or close the State Assembly. The Ministry of State was appointed by the president of the State Assembly, had a collegial structure and depended on the confidence of a majority in parliament. In order to provide legal certainty, all previous laws that did not contradict the provisional order remained in force.

The most important task of the Assembly was to draft a constitution. The constitutional committee included eleven members from the MSPD, six from the Centre, four each from the DDP and the right-wing nationalist German National People's Party (DNVP), and one each from the USPD and the German People's Party (DVP). (See the Constitution section below for additional details.)

On 25 March 1919, the Hirsch government resigned. As at the federal level, it was replaced by a coalition of the MSPD, Centre and DDP, the so-called Weimar Coalition, which together held 298 of 401 seats. Hirsch became Minister President. His cabinet included four members from the MSPD, two from the Centre, and two from the DDP. Most of the ministries had existed under the monarchy, although the Ministry of Public Welfare was new. Along with the Ministry of the Interior, it developed into one of the largest ministries because of the range of its tasks.

=== Unrest and the Kapp Putsch ===
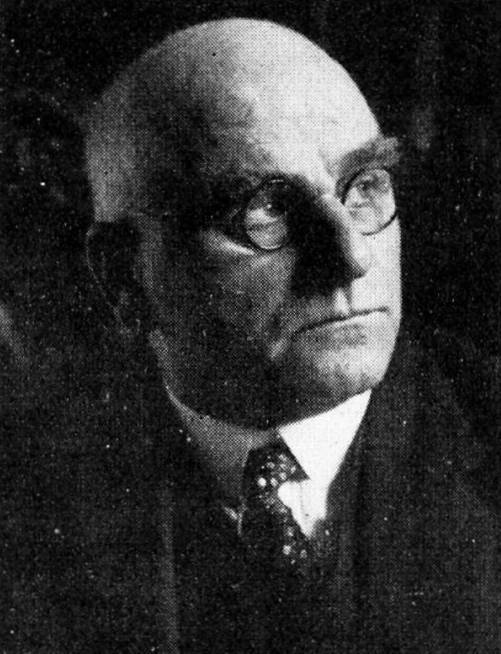
Otto Braun, who became the Free State of Prussia's longest serving Minister President

Widespread strikes broke out in the Ruhr valley in January 1919 in protest against the revolution's failure to socialize the mining industry. After the federal government sent in the paramilitary Freikorps Lichtschlag, a general strike involving 350,000 miners took place in early April. Carl Severing, an MSPD member of both the Prussian State Assembly and the Weimar National Assembly, was brought in to calm the situation. He succeeded in breaking the deadlock and brought the strike to an end.

In August 1919, armed uprisings took place in Upper Silesia among segments of the Polish population (first Silesian uprising); the violence there was also suppressed by military means. In Pomerania clashes broke out between agricultural workers and large landowners, who received support from regional army and Freikorps units. Agriculture Minister Otto Braun pushed through an emergency decree in September to enforce collectively agreed on regulations regarding farm workers' wages.

In March 1920, the republican order in Germany and in Prussia was challenged by the Kapp Putsch, a right-wing attempt to overthrow the national government. It was part of specifically Prussian history in that the only relatively united social group behind the putsch was the state's large landowners. They were joined by some military officers and members of the educated civil service. Overall, the putsch was a rebellion of conservative East Elbia, the largely rural area east of the Elbe River, that feared the loss of its traditional power. While the national government fled Berlin, the Prussian government remained. A general strike against the putsch, initiated in particular by unions and civil servants and supported by the MSPD, largely paralyzed public life in Prussia. Most of the governors of the Prussian provinces stood behind the legal state government. Only those of the provinces of Schleswig-Holstein, Hanover and East Prussia supported the putsch. It is noteworthy that August Winnig, the governor of East Prussia, was a Social Democrat. The situation was different with many district administrators. There was a clear east-west divide among them. In the western provinces, almost all of the district administrators stood by the constitutional government, even if in some cases only under pressure from the workers. In East Prussia, all of them sided with the anti-republicans. The coup attempt collapsed after six days.

The Kapp Putsch and ensuing general strike led to a profound break that turned Prussia into something close to a model republican state. Otto Braun replaced Hirsch as Minister President. Carl Severing became the new Minister of the Interior. Both were much more assertive than their predecessors in office. Hirsch and Finance Minister Südekum were also politically discredited because they had negotiated with the putschists. The "Braun-Severing system" became synonymous with democratic Prussia.

== Structure ==
=== Territory ===
Of all of Germany's territorial losses under the Treaty of Versailles, only a small part of the Saar region (in green) had not been part of, or under the administration of, the Kingdom of Prussia. Administered by the League of Nations Annexed or transferred to neighbouring countries by the treaty, or later via plebiscite and League of Nations action Weimar Germany

Most of the German territorial losses required by the Treaty of Versailles affected Prussia. Eupen-Malmedy went to Belgium, the Hultschiner Ländchen to Czechoslovakia, Danzig became a free city under the administration of the League of Nations, and the Memel Territory came under Allied administration before going to Lithuania in 1923. Large areas of the provinces of Posen and West Prussia became part of the new state of Poland, leaving East Prussia separated from the rest of Germany by the Polish Corridor.

Some changes were decided by plebiscites. In northern Schleswig, 74% of the vote on 10 February 1920 was in favor of annexation to Denmark, to which it was subsequently ceded. In a zone immediately south of that area, 81% of voters chose on 14 March to remain in Germany. Eastern Upper Silesia went to Poland even though 59.6% of voters in the 1921 Upper Silesia plebiscite chose to remain part of Germany. The plebiscite regions of southern East Prussia and parts of West Prussia remained in Germany after over 90% of those who voted favored Germany over Poland. The Saar region was placed under the control of the League of Nations for fifteen years before a referendum was to be held there. The former Imperial Territory of Alsace–Lorraine, which had been effectively under Prussian administration since it was won from France in the Franco-Prussian War of 1870–1871, was returned to France without a vote.

The Free State of Waldeck-Pyrmont was the only territory Prussia gained during the Weimar Republic. The Pyrmont district voted to join Prussia (the Province of Hanover) in a 1921 plebiscite. Waldeck followed with its own plebiscite in 1929 and became part of the Prussian Province of Hesse-Nassau.

The loss of territory had considerable negative economic and financial consequences for the Prussian state, including the costs of repatriation and provision for state employees. Under the Ministry of Justice alone, 3,500 civil servants and employees were affected.

Prussian Regions Ceded under the Treaty of Versailles
| Region | Ceded to | Area in km^{2} | Population | German as native language in % |
|---|---|---|---|---|
| Posen* | Poland | 26,042 | 1,946,000 | 34.4 |
| West Prussia* | Poland | 15,865 | 965,000 | 42.7 |
| East Upper Silesia* | Poland | 3,213 | 893,000 | 29.6 |
| Danzig | Free City of Danzig | 1,914 | 331,000 | 95.2 |
| Memel Territory | Lithuania | 2,657 | 141,000 | 51.1 |
| Hultschin | Czechoslovakia | 316 | 48,000 | 14.6 |
| North Schleswig | Denmark | 3,992 | 166,000 | 24.1 |
| Eupen-Malmedy | Belgium | 1,036 | 60,000 | 81.7 |

(Note: Asterisks indicate that only part of the region was ceded. A very small part of Pomerania also went to Poland.)

=== Population ===
After 1918, the population of Prussia did not increase as rapidly as it had before the war. In addition to the continuation of the demographic transition of modern industrial societies to lower birth rates, the losses of the World War I were also a factor. The large population movements within Prussia slowed. In contrast to the period before 1914, more people were moving into Prussia from foreign countries than were emigrating. In-migration from ceded territories, along with increasing immigration, especially from Eastern Europe, both played a role.

There were major differences in population density across Prussia. In 1925, East Prussia had an average of 60.9 inhabitants per square kilometer, while the Rhine Province had 295.6. Because of the extent of its low population rural regions, Prussia had a density of 130.7 per square kilometer, which was below average among the German states. The Free State of Saxony, by way of contrast, had 333 inhabitants per km^{2}.

Population of Selected Large Cities 1910–1939 (in thousands)
| City | 1910 | 1925 | 1939 | Increase |
|---|---|---|---|---|
| Berlin | 2,071 | 4,024 | 4,339 | 110% |
| Cologne | 516 | 700 | 772 | 50% |
| Breslau | 512 | 557 | 629 | 23% |
| Duisburg | 229 | 272 | 434 | 90% |
| Essen | 295 | 470 | 667 | 126% |
| Düsseldorf | 359 | 433 | 541 | 51% |
| Dortmund | 214 | 322 | 542 | 153% |
| Königsberg | 246 | 280 | 372 | 51% |

=== Settlement patterns and urban growth ===
Urbanization and urban growth lost momentum compared to the pre-1914 period. Population increases in larger cities were caused not so much by in-migration as by incorporation. This was the case with the formation of Greater Berlin in 1920, when 8 cities, 59 rural communities and 27 estate districts were incorporated. Even more extensive and consequential for the formation of large cities were the municipal reforms in the Ruhr region at the end of the 1920s.

There were considerable geographical differences in the extent of urbanization. While in East Prussia more than 60% of the inhabitants lived in village communities in 1925, in the Province of Westphalia the figure was just 16.5%. In East Prussia, 12.4% of the population lived in cities with more than 100,000 inhabitants; in the Rhine Province, it was over 41%.

=== Economy ===
Percentage of Employment by Economic Sector 1925
| Region | Agriculture | Industry and Skilled Trades | Trade and Transport |
|---|---|---|---|
| East Prussia | 45.4 | 19.6 | 12.9 |
| Brandenburg | 31.5 | 36.6 | 13.9 |
| Berlin | 0.8 | 46.2 | 28.1 |
| Pomerania | 41.2 | 23.5 | 14.8 |
| Posen–West Prussia | 47.5 | 19.4 | 12.8 |
| Lower Silesia | 27.4 | 37.1 | 15.7 |
| Upper Silesia | 30.7 | 36.5 | 13.8 |
| Saxony | 23.5 | 42.2 | 16.0 |
| Schleswig-Holstein | 23.0 | 33.3 | 20.4 |
| Hanover | 31.7 | 33.9 | 16.9 |
| Westphalia | 13.3 | 56.8 | 14.2 |
| Hesse-Nassau | 21.9 | 39.6 | 18.9 |
| Rhine Province | 13.3 | 50.9 | 18.6 |
| Hohenzollern Lands | 53.7 | 26.0 | 7.1 |
| Prussia | 22.0 | 41.3 | 17.5 |

Industry and the skilled trades dominated Prussia's economy in 1925, accounting for 41.3% of all workers. Agriculture played only a secondary role at 22%, with trade and transport trailing only slightly at 17.5%. The other economic sectors lagged well behind. There were big geographic differences in Prussia's economic structure as well. In East Prussia, agriculture employed 45.4% of the workforce, while industry and skilled crafts accounted for only 19.6%. By contrast, agriculture was of very little importance in the Rhineland and Westphalia, each with about 13%. The commercial sector was correspondingly strong, at over 56% in Westphalia. Commercial employment in Berlin at 46% was high, but the city's metropolitan character was reflected above all in the share of the trade and transport sector, which was over 28%. Overall, there were still considerable economic differences after 1918 between the eastern part of the Free State, which tended to be agrarian and the industrial west.

=== Social structure ===
In 1925, almost half the population was employed. Of these, 46.8% were blue collar workers, 17.1% were salaried employees and civil servants, 16.2% were self-employed, 15.4% were contributing family members (those who work in a business managed by a self-employed member of their family such as an independent farmer or shop owner and who receive at most pocket money instead of a salary), and 4.5% were domestic workers. The unemployment rate in 1925 was 6%. The proportions varied depending on the predominant economic sector in the individual provinces. In more rural East Prussia, the number of contributing family members was significantly higher at 22.3% than in industrial Westphalia, where it was 12.8%. Conversely, the proportion of blue-collar workers in East Prussia was 42.6%, while in Westphalia it was 54.1%. In metropolitan Berlin, the proportion of blue-collar workers at 45.9% was lower than in Westphalia despite Berlin's important industrial sector. The reason was the strength of the city's tertiary sector. Salaried employees and civil servants accounted for 30.5% in Berlin, whereas in Westphalia it was 15.6%.

Berlin's special urban situation was also reflected in its average income. At 1,566 Reichsmarks in 1928, the average income in Berlin-Brandenburg was more than 30% higher than the national average. In agrarian East Prussia, average earnings were only 814 Reichsmarks, more than 30% below the average. Industrial areas such as Westphalia and the Rhineland were roughly in line with the German average.

Despite the efforts of the Prussian government in areas such as education, upward mobility remained limited. In 1927/1928, only 1% of junior lawyers came from working-class families. Advancement opportunities were significantly better in the elementary school sector. The proportion of students from working-class families at teacher training colleges rose from 7% in 1928/29 to 10% in 1932/1933.

== State and administration ==
=== Administrative divisions ===
Prussian Provinces (1925)
| Province | Capital | Area in km^{2} | Population in 1,000s | Density per km^{2} |
|---|---|---|---|---|
| Greater Berlin | Berlin | 884 | 4,024 | 4,554 |
| Brandenburg | Potsdam | 39,039 | 2,592 | 66 |
| East Prussia | Königsberg | 36,991 | 2,256 | 61 |
| Hanover | Hanover | 38,788 | 3,191 | 82 |
| Hesse-Nassau | Kassel | 15,790 | 2,397 | 152 |
| Hohenzollern Lands | Sigmaringen | 1,142 | 72 | 63 |
| Lower Silesia | Breslau | 26,600 | 3,132 | 118 |
| Pomerania | Stettin | 30,270 | 1,879 | 62 |
| Posen–West Prussia | Schneidemühl | 7,715 | 332 | 43 |
| Rhine Province | Koblenz | 23,974 | 7,257 | 303 |
| Saxony | Magdeburg | 25,528 | 3,277 | 128 |
| Schleswig-Holstein | Kiel | 15,073 | 1,519 | 101 |
| Upper Silesia | Oppeln | 9,714 | 1,379 | 142 |
| Westphalia | Münster | 20,215 | 4,811 | 238 |
| Free State of Prussia | Berlin | 291,700 | 38,206 | 131 |

The Free State consisted of twelve provinces plus Berlin, whose status corresponded to that of a province. The Hohenzollern Lands in southern Germany were a unique type of administrative district (Regierungsbezirk) that was not a true province but which had almost all the rights of one. The provinces were headed by governors (Oberpräsidenten) appointed by the Ministry of State. There was, in addition, a provincial council consisting of the governor, a member appointed by the minister of the Interior and five members elected by the provincial committee. The provinces each had a parliament. In Hesse-Nassau, municipal parliaments existed for the district associations alongside the provincial parliament. The provincial parliaments elected a Landeshauptmann who headed the governmental administration; the corresponding office in Berlin was the mayor. In addition, the provincial parliament elected a provincial committee from its own ranks to manage day-to-day business. The provincial parliaments sent representatives to the national-level Reichsrat and the corresponding Prussian State Council (Staatsrat).

Below the provincial level, there were (as of 1933) 34 administrative districts; some provinces, including Posen–West Prussia, Upper Silesia, Schleswig-Holstein and Berlin, had just a single administrative district. A total of 361 districts (called Kreise or Landkreise) formed the basis of state administration in rural areas and small towns. Larger cities generally formed urban districts (Stadtkreise), of which there were a total of 116. While there were only five urban districts in agrarian East Prussia, there were 21 in industrial Westphalia.

=== Constitution ===
Main: Constitution of the Free State of Prussia – via Wikisource. (Full text in English)

A draft constitution was not presented to the State Assembly until 26 April 1920 because of delays caused by the Kapp Putsch and the wait for the Weimar Constitution, which was ratified on 11 August 1919. On 30 November 1920, the State Assembly adopted the constitution of the Free State of Prussia. 280 deputies voted in favor, 60 against and 7 abstained. The national-conservative German National People's Party and independent deputies in particular voted against it.

In contrast to the national government and numerous other states in the Weimar Republic, Prussia had no state president. The lack of an institution above the governing ministers and the parliamentary majority clearly distinguished Prussia from the federal government. Overall, the position of parliament (the Landtag) under the constitution was strong. A distinctive feature was the minister president's position, which was elevated by his authority to make policy. Minister President Otto Braun in particular made purposeful use of the power.

The constitution also provided for elements of plebiscitary democracy in the form of referendums and petitions.

==== Landtag (parliament) ====
The legislative period of the Landtag was four years. It could be dissolved by a majority vote or a referendum. The Landtag acted as the legislature, elected the minister president, had the right to establish committees of inquiry, and could amend the constitution by a majority of two-thirds of the deputies. It also had the right to censure individual ministers or the Ministry of State as a whole. With a two-thirds majority, it could impeach ministers before the state court.

Minister Presidents of Prussia (1918–1945)
| Name | Party | Took office | Left office |
|---|---|---|---|
| Paul Hirsch; Heinrich Ströbel | MSPD; USPD | 12 November 1918 | 3 January 1919 |
| Paul Hirsch | MSPD | 3 January 1919 | 25 March 1920 |
| Otto Braun | MSPD | 27 March 1920 | 10 March 1921 |
| Adam Stegerwald | Centre | 21 April 1921 | 5 November 1921 |
| Otto Braun | SPD | 7 November 1921 | 23 January 1925 |
| Wilhelm Marx | Centre | 18 February 1925 | 20 February 1925 |
| Otto Braun | SPD | 6 April 1925 | 20 July 1932, acting until 6 February 1933 |
| Franz von Papen (as Reich Commissioner) | Independent | 20 July 1932; 30 January 1933 | 3 December 1932; 7 April 1933 |
| Kurt von Schleicher (as Reich Commissioner) | Independent | 3 December 1932 | 30 January 1933 |
| Hermann Göring | NSDAP | 11 April 1933 | 23 April 1945 |

==== Ministry of State ====
The Ministry of State was the highest and leading authority in the state; it consisted of the minister president and the ministers of state (Article 7). Although it was organized collegially, the minister president had policy-making authority (Article 46). He was elected by the Landtag. After an amendment to the rules of procedure, an absolute majority was required from 1932 onward. The minister president appointed the other ministers (Article 45).

The constitution did not specify the ministries; they came about from practical requirements. Following the transfer of military responsibilities to the national government, there was no Prussian Minister of War after 1919. The minister of Public Works also lost his most important area of responsibility with the establishment of the German National Railway, and the ministry was dissolved in 1921. The office of the Minister of Welfare, which had existed in the provisional government, was formally created. There were also ministries of the Interior, Finance, Justice, Agriculture and Trade. The Ministry of Spiritual, Educational and Medical Affairs was renamed the Ministry of Science, Art and National Education in 1918. The economic interests of the state were largely concentrated in the Ministry of Trade and Commerce. It was the second most powerful state ministry after the Ministry of the Interior and was able to have a considerable impact on domestic and foreign trade beyond Prussia's borders.

After the 1932 Prussian coup d'état, in which Franz von Papen as Reich Commissioner replaced Prussia's legal government, the Ministry of Welfare in its old form was dissolved. At the same time, the minister of Trade also became the minister of Economics and Labor. The Ministry of Justice was dissolved in 1935 under the law transferring the administration of justice to the central government.

==== State Council ====
The constitution required the formation of a State Council similar to the national Reichsrat to represent the provinces of Prussia. Its members were elected by the provincial parliaments; they could not be parliamentary members at the same time. The government was to inform the State Council about important affairs. The State Council could express its views, had the right to initiate legislation and could lodge an objection to laws passed by the Landtag. With a two-thirds majority, the Landtag could, with a few exceptions, reject the objection or call for a referendum. Until 1933, the mayor of Cologne and future Chancellor of the Federal Republic of Germany, Konrad Adenauer, was chairman of the State Council.

=== Relationship to the national government ===
The Weimar Constitution and the new Prussian Constitution permanently changed the relationship between the Prussian and national governments. Unlike during the Empire, the executive branch of the national government was completely independent of Prussia's. The same person was no longer both German chancellor and Prussian minister president. The great importance of state taxes declined in favor of central tax administration. The federal government had fiscal sovereignty and distributed revenues to the states. Along with the military and railroads, waterways and a large part of social administration became the responsibility of the national government.

Although 61% of Germany's population lived in Prussia in 1925, it had only 40% of the votes in the Reichsrat. In a departure from the empire's Federal Council, and in contrast to the other states, only half of the members of the Reichsrat to which Prussia was entitled were appointed by the Prussian government. The remaining members were elected by its provincial parliaments.

=== State-owned enterprises ===
Between 1921 and 1925, the administration of state-owned enterprises was moved away from the Prussian Ministry of Trade and Industry on the initiative of the department's minister, Wilhelm Siering (SPD). Joint stock companies were formed to manage the state-owned mines, salt works, smelters, water works, and electrical generation plants. Ideas about the economic common good, such as those advocated by state secretary Hans Staudinger (SPD), also played a role in the expedited development of state-owned companies.

== Political system ==
=== Party system ===
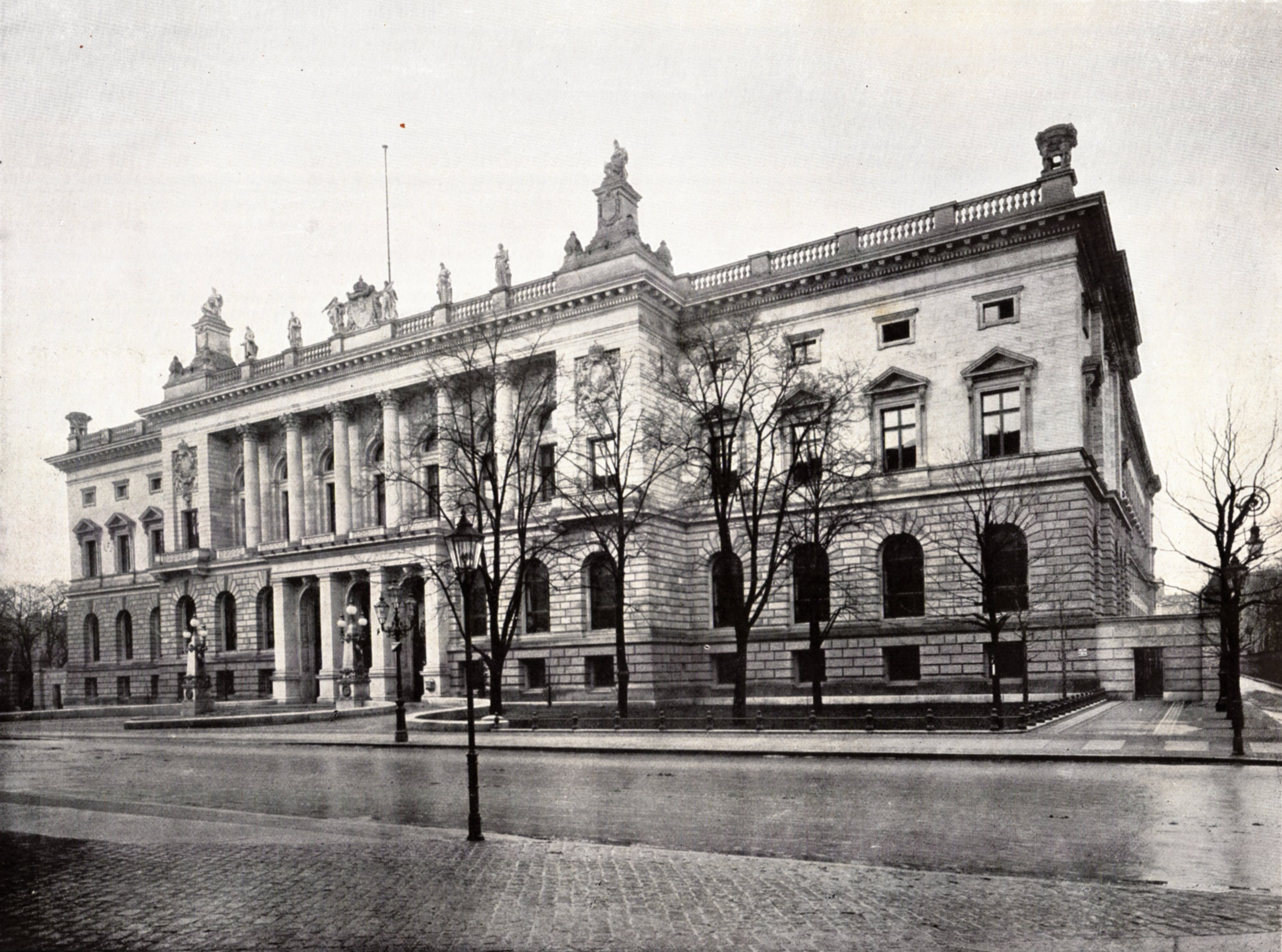
The Prussian House of Representatives, seat of the Landtag of Prussia

Prussian political parties largely mirrored those at the national level. They can be grouped under conservatism (German National People's Party, DNVP), political Catholicism (Centre Party), liberalism (German People's Party, DVP, and German Democratic Party, DDP), social democracy (Majority Social Democratic Party, MSPD) and socialism/communism (Independent Social Democratic Party, USPD, and Communist Party of Germany, KPD). The DNVP supported the restoration of the Hohenzollern monarchy. Among the regional parties, the German-Hanoverian Party (DHP) had some influence. The MSPD and USPD, which had split in 1917, merged in 1922 and resumed the original SPD name. (A small and politically insignificant part of the USPD continued to exist until 1931, when it merged with the Socialist Worker's Party of Germany.)

The DNVP and DVP had strongholds in a few cities and in areas that were more rural and Protestant, especially east of the Elbe River. In East Prussia, the DNVP received over 30% of the vote in the 1928 federal election for the Reichstag. The Centre was strong in Catholic areas such as Silesia, the Rhineland and Westphalia. The left-wing parties were important in large cities and heavily commercial non-Catholic areas. In Berlin, for example, the SPD's vote came to 34% in 1928 and the KPD's to almost 30%. The rise of the Nazi Party (NSDAP) changed the pattern, but it remained dominant in basic terms until 1932.

Within Prussia, there were considerable differences in support for the Republic. The majority in Berlin, the Rhineland and Westphalia were in favor of a democracy, while reservations remained in the eastern and agrarian provinces. In the March 1933 Reichstag election, the NSDAP had above-average strength in constituencies such as East Prussia (56.5%), Frankfurt an der Oder (55.2%), Liegnitz (54%) and Schleswig-Holstein (53.2%), but it was significantly weaker than the national average of 43.9% in Berlin (31.3%), Westphalia (34.3%) and the Rhineland (34.1%).

A factor in Prussia's political stability was that the SPD, which was the strongest party during most of the Weimar Republic, was prepared until 1932 to assume government responsibility and not withdraw into an opposition role as it had at the national level in 1920, 1923 and 1930. The philosopher Eduard Spranger spoke of an "affinity of social democracy for the Prussian", and Otto Braun claimed that "Prussia has never been governed in a more Prussian manner than during my term of office". In addition to the party's leading individuals, structural reasons also played a role in the SPD's strength. The abolition of the three-class franchise, which weighted votes based on the amount of taxes paid, and the institution of a democratic constitution were more pronounced breaks in Prussia than in other German states that had had similar voting systems. Unlike in the Reichstag, which had many long-standing SPD parliamentarians who were accustomed to an opposition role, there were hardly any such in the Prussian Landtag. The parliamentary party members were therefore not as influenced by entrenched roles and were better able to adapt to being a party that formed part of the government. In addition, the left wing of the party, which was critical of cooperation with the bourgeois parties, was weak. Compromise solutions were therefore easier to implement in Prussia than nationally.

Despite their strength, especially in the large cities, only a few mayors in the major cities were Social Democrats. The party had respect for the expertise of bourgeois municipal politicians and often left the positions to representatives of the DDP; Berlin's longest serving mayor, Gustav Böß (1921–1929), was a member of the DDP. Only Ernst Reuter in Magdeburg and Max Brauer in Altona were among the Social Democratic mayors in early 1933. Berlin's last mayor under the Weimar Republic, Heinrich Sahm, was an independent until he joined the Nazi Party in early 1933.

=== Democratisation of the state administration ===
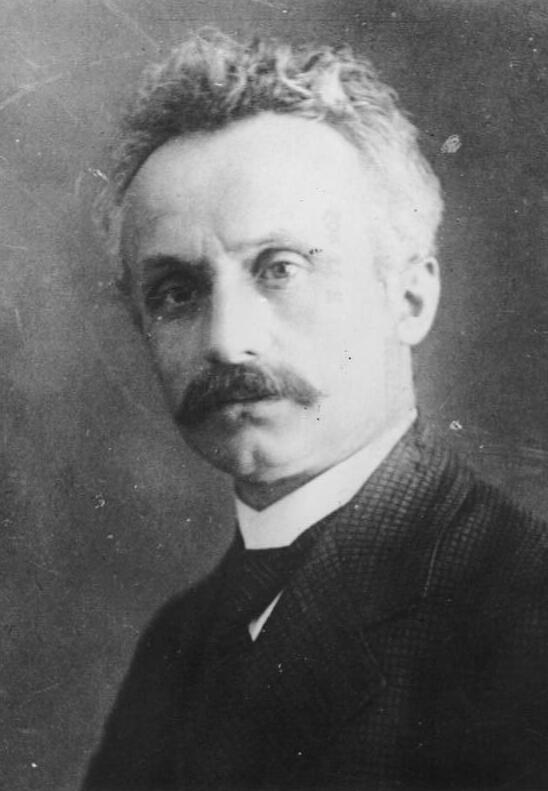
Carl Severing, as Prussian minister of the Interior, he was key in democratising the state's administration.

During the revolution, Prussian civil servants declared that their loyalty was not to the monarchy but to the Prussian state. Initially, the government, and in particular the Minister of the Interior Wolfgang Heine (SPD), largely refrained from reorganizing the state administration along republican lines. He appointed Magnus Freiherr von Braun (DNVP) – father of rocket scientist Wernher von Braun and later one of the supporters of the Kapp Putsch – as a personnel officer. By the end of 1919, only 46 Social Democrats had been appointed to higher administrative posts. Of some 480 district administrators (Landräte), only 24 belonged to the SPD. The Kapp Putsch showed the weakly developed loyalty of some of the senior civil servants, many of whom were close to the DNVP, which was hostile to the Republic.

After Carl Severing (MSPD) was named Prussian minister of the Interior following the March 1920 Kapp Putsch, he carried out a series of fundamental reforms. Senior civil servants hostile to the Republic were dismissed, and the political reliability of new hires was checked. A total of about one hundred senior civil servants were placed on retirement. Among them were three governors (Oberpräsidenten), three district presidents (Regierungspräsidenten) and 88 district administrators. Almost all were from the eastern provinces. In addition to supporters of the conservative parties, those let go included the Social Democratic governors August Winnig (East Prussia) and Felix Philipp (Lower Silesia).

Severing and his successors purposely appointed supporters of the coalition parties as political officials. The policy led to a considerable change in the heads of departments. In 1929, 291 of 540 political officials were members of Weimar Coalition parties, including nine of 11 governors and 21 of 32 district presidents. The shift also changed the social composition among top officials. While in 1918, eleven governors were aristocrats, there were only two in the period between 1920 and 1932. Some regions nevertheless continued to lag. In the western provinces, 78% of newly appointed district administrators were supporters of the governing parties, but as late as 1926, supporters of the coalition made up only one third of district administrators in the eastern provinces; the rest were mostly conservative non-partisans. Another limitation was that a breakup of the monopoly of lawyers in the higher civil service posts did not succeed. Only in exceptional cases, such as that of Wilhelm Richter, Berlin's police chief, were outsiders appointed.

=== Republicanisation of the police ===
The Prussian police force was not only the strongest in Germany but also the most important instrument of the Prussian government's executive branch for maintaining constitutional order. Massive restructuring also began in the police force after the Kapp Putsch in order to ensure its loyalty to the Republic. Under Severing's leadership, the republican-minded police chief Wilhelm Abegg became the decisive figure in carrying out the reform. By the end of the 1920s, all leading police officers were republicans. Of thirty police chiefs in 1928, fifteen were members of the SPD, five belonged to the Centre, four to the DDP, three to the DVP, and the rest were non-partisan.

Below the command level, however, the situation was somewhat different. A large proportion of the police were former professional soldiers; the majority were conservative and anti-communist, and some maintained relations with right-wing organizations. For them, the enemy was on the Left.

=== Justice ===
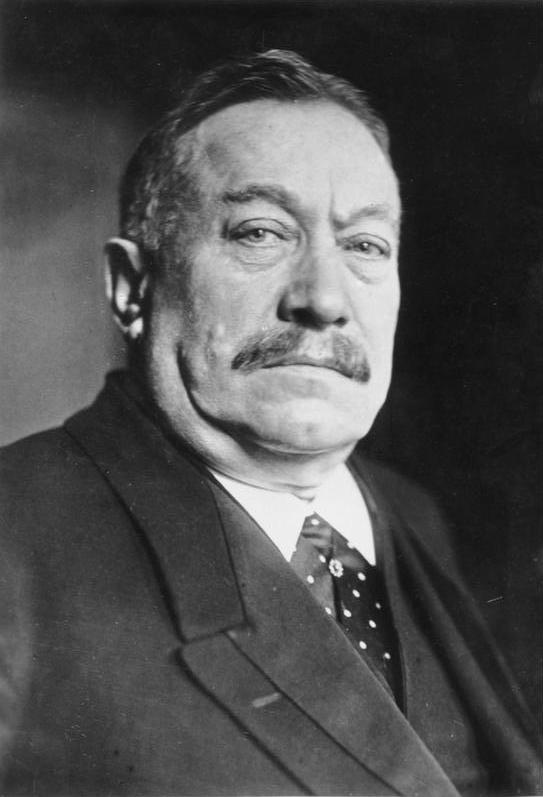
Justice Minister Hugo am Zehnhoff

In the judiciary, reforms remained limited even longer than they did in the police force. Many judges continued to support the monarchy. In political trials, left-wing defendants were regularly judged more harshly than those on the Right. One reason in particular for the hesitant intervention of democrats and centrists was respect for the independence of the judiciary. The autonomy of judges had been explicitly enshrined in the constitution. It made a fundamental republicanization of the judiciary impossible. Moreover, Minister of Justice Hugo am Zehnhoff, who held the office from 1919 to 1927, had no real interest in judicial reform. The authorities did, however, pay attention to the attitude towards democracy among new appointees. But the Free State did not survive long enough for it to have a noticeable effect. One estimate in 1932 suggested that only about 5% of judges were Republican-minded.

== Weimar Republic (1921–1933) ==
=== Grand coalition (1921–1925) ===
==== Formation ====
After the adoption of the Prussian constitution on 30 November 1920, an election for the first regular Prussian Landtag was set for 20 February 1921. The Majority Social Democrats (MSPD) finished first with 114 seats, followed by the Catholic Centre Party with 81. Even though the German Democratic Party (DDP) lost seats to the German People's Party (DVP), the Weimar coalition of the SPD, DDP, and Centre, with a combined total of 224 of the 428 seats, held on to the majority that it had had in the State Assembly, although by a much smaller margin. At the national level, the MSPD lost so many seats in the 1920 Reichstag election that it dropped out of the government, and a minority ministry of the Centre, DDP and DVP was built.

1921 Landtag Election (parties that won seats)
| Party | Pct. of votes | Seats | + / - vs. 1919 |
|---|---|---|---|
| MSPD | 26.3 | 114 | -31 |
| Centre | 17.2 | 81 | -12 |
| DNVP | 18.1 | 75 | +27 |
| DVP | 14.2 | 58 | +35 |
| KPD | 7.4 | 31 | New |
| USPD | 6.6 | 28 | +4 |
| DDP | 6.2 | 26 | -39 |
| DHP | 2.7 | 11 | +9 |
| WP | 1.2 | 4 | New |

Forming a new Prussian government did not prove to be easy. While the DDP and the Centre wanted to bring the DVP into the coalition, the MSPD rejected the proposal because of the DVP's unclear attitude towards the Republic. As a result, Otto Braun did not run as a candidate for minister president. Instead, Adam Stegerwald of the Centre Party was elected by the Landtag on 21 April with the votes of the bourgeois parties, including the German National People's Party (DNVP). He formed a minority government consisting of the Centre, DDP and three independents. They had to seek support from the MSPD and DNVP on a case-by-case basis.

Pressure on Prussian policy came primarily from external factors. In March 1921, Allied troops occupied Düsseldorf and Duisburg to put pressure on Germany to make its required war reparations payments. The assassination of former vice-chancellor and minister of Finance Matthias Erzberger on 26 August by members of the far-right Organisation Consul shocked supporters of the Republic. In September 1921, the MSPD cleared the way for a coalition with the DVP at its party congress in Görlitz. Otto Braun stated:

What we are dealing with here is the conversion of our party from an acting to a governing party. This is very difficult for many because it takes us from a comfortable position to one that is sometimes very uncomfortable and full of responsibility. [...] The comrades who speak against the resolution do not have sufficient confidence in the power of our party's appeal. We must have the will to power.

After the MSPD withdrew support from the Prussian government in October 1921, accusing the Ministry of State of leaning towards the DNVP, negotiations began to form a grand coalition. On 5 November 1921, the MSPD and DVP joined the cabinet, and Stegerwald resigned. The opposition within the MSPD parliamentary group was considerable. Forty-six deputies voted for and 41 against the formation of a grand coalition. There were also significant reservations within the DVP. In the end, 197 of 339 deputies present voted for Braun as minister president. He chose his cabinet from members of the MSPD, Centre, DDP and DVP. Carl Severing again became minister of the Interior.

Prussia's grand coalition proved to be a stabilizing factor in the Weimar Republic and contributed to its ability to survive the crisis year of 1923. The DVP remained loyal to the coalition even though it was courted by the DNVP to form a "citizens' bloc". An effectively functioning coalition committee successfully ensured that the different political interests were balanced, but despite the collegial cooperation, Braun and Severing dominated the government.

The coalition lay claim to nothing less than a "Prussian democratic mission" for all of Germany. This was especially true after the murder of German Foreign Minister Walther Rathenau (DDP) on 24 June 1922, once again by members of the Organisation Consul. On the basis of the Law for the Protection of the Republic, which was strongly supported by the Prussian government, Interior Minister Severing banned the Nazi Party in Prussia on 15 November 1922. Four months later, he also banned the German Völkisch Freedom Party (DVFP), which he called a disguised offshoot of the NSDAP.

==== Crisis year 1923 ====
Prussian territory was directly affected when troops from France and Belgium occupied the Ruhr on 11 January 1923 after Germany defaulted on its war reparations payments. Immediately before the occupation, the Prussian Landtag, with the exception of the Communist Party, protested against the actions of the French and Belgians. The national government called on the population of the occupied territory, including the Prussian provinces of Rhineland and Westphalia, to engage in passive resistance against the occupation, and officials were instructed not to obey the orders of the occupiers. It quickly became apparent, however, that the economic burden caused by the situation was unsupportable. The upward trend in inflation that had been evident since World War I exploded into the Weimar Republic's hyperinflation.

A Rhenish separatist movement, which had tried unsuccessfully to set up an independent Rhineland during the 1918 revolution, briefly revived as a result of the economic misery that came with the hyperinflation. A Rhenish Republic was proclaimed in various cities in October in the hopes that separation from Prussia would hasten recovery, but the self-declared state survived less than a month.

The major political crises of 1923, such as the Beer Hall Putsch instigated by Adolf Hitler in Bavaria and the attempt at a communist revolution, the so-called "German October" in central Germany, took place outside Prussia. German Chancellor Gustav Stresemann of the DVP described the Prussia of the 1923 crisis period as the "bulwark of German republicans".

==== Cabinet of Wilhelm Marx ====
1924 Landtag Election (parties that won seats)
| Party | Pct. of votes | Seats | + / - vs. 1921 |
|---|---|---|---|
| SPD | 24.9 | 114 | 0 |
| DNVP | 23.7 | 109 | +34 |
| Centre | 17.6 | 81 | 0 |
| DVP | 9.8 | 45 | -13 |
| KPD | 9.6 | 44 | +13 |
| DDP | 5.9 | 27 | +1 |
| NSFP | 2.5 | 11 | New |
| WP | 2.5 | 11 | +7 |
| DHP | 1.4 | 6 | -5 |
| Poland Party | 0.4 | 2 | New |

A new Landtag election was held on 7 December 1924. The SPD's seat count remained flat despite the fact that the MSPD and USPD had recombined since the previous election. The KPD added 13 seats, but the big winner was the DNVP with a gain of 34 seats.

At the beginning of 1925, there were increasing signs that the grand coalition's common ground had been lost. On 5 January, the DVP, which had lost 13 seats in the election, demanded that the DNVP be brought into the government and that Braun resign. When he refused, the DVP withdrew its ministers from the government and brought an end to the coalition. Forming a new government proved as difficult as it had been in 1920. On 10 February 1925, former German chancellor Wilhelm Marx (Centre), supported by the Centre, DDP and SPD, was elected minister president. He formed a cabinet consisting of the Centre and DDP, keeping Severing (SPD) as Minister of the Interior. After almost immediately losing a vote of confidence, Marx resigned but remained in office until April in an acting capacity.

=== High point of political stability ===
Otto Braun was again elected minister president on 3 April 1925, with 216 of 430 votes in the Landtag. Like Marx, his base was SPD, Centre and DDP. Braun took over the majority of Marx's cabinet and looked to continuity in policy. He blamed the months-long government crisis on what he called the "German national communist bloc", by which he meant all the opposition parties from the DNVP and DVP to the KPD and various small parties, which included the Nazis. Braun said that "they are as incapable of building as they are unanimous in destroying." The new cabinet was a minority government, but it proved remarkably stable.

==== Settlement with the Hohenzollerns ====
The question of financial settlements with Germany's former ruling dynasties was, in principle, a matter for the states. In Prussia, negotiations with the Hohenzollerns failed in 1920 because the SPD rejected the proposal in the Landtag, and the former royal house objected to it in 1924. In 1925, the Ministry of Finance under Hermann Höpker-Aschoff (DDP) submitted another draft proposal. It was extraordinarily favorable to the Hohenzollerns and led to fierce criticism from the SPD and DDP. The DDP then introduced a bill in the Reichstag that would authorize the states to find a solution without recourse to the courts. It was the starting point for a political process that led to the failed referendum on princely expropriation at the national level in 1926.

The Braun government subsequently intensified negotiations with the Hohenzollerns over the former royal house's assets. In the end, a compromise was reached that the SPD viewed very critically. The main Hohenzollern line received 250,000 acres of land and 15 million Reichsmarks. The Prussian state also received 250,000 acres, plus the royal palaces, works of art, the coronation regalia, the library of the former royal house, the archives and the theater. In the Landtag, KPD deputies reacted with anger and even violence. The vote went in favor of the agreement. It is noteworthy that not only did the Communists reject the bill, but also that the representatives of the governing SPD either voted against it or did not participate in the vote. Braun was only able to ensure that more SPD deputies did not vote against the bill by threatening to resign.

==== Tensions with the national government ====
Black-red-gold flag of the Weimar Republic

Black-white-red flag of Imperial Germany

On 6 October 1926, as had been agreed with Braun some time earlier, Carl Severing resigned as minister of the Interior, leaving Braun the only political heavyweight in the cabinet. Severing was succeeded by Albert Grzesinski (SPD).

There were frequent tensions between the Christian-bourgeois national governments and the center-left government in Prussia. One practical issue was revenue sharing between the federal government and the states. Compensation for the financial harm caused by territorial losses under the terms of the Treaty of Versailles remained a central point of conflict between the national government and Prussia. The disputes over the use of flags on Constitution Day in 1927 fell into the realm of symbolic politics, which was important for the citizens' idea of the state. Braun announced a boycott of those hotels in Berlin that flew the old imperial black-white-red colors instead of the Republic's black-red-gold. When he asked the national government to join in the boycott call, Minister of the Interior Walter von Keudell (DNVP) protested against Prussia's "insolence". The conflict was exacerbated when Prussian Minister of Culture Becker restricted the rights of student self-government at Prussian universities because of the increasing influence of the völkisch movement there. When nationally minded student bodies protested against the move, Keudell openly backed them. Not least because of his work in addressing these and other conflicts with Keudell, Braun became an important integration figure among Social Democrats.

==== Agricultural policy ====
A relic of the feudal past in Prussia was the manorial district. Those living on them had no communal right of residence and were subject to the police power invested in the landlords. Using groundwork laid by Interior Minister Grzesinski, the Braun government abolished the districts in 1927. The change affected 12,000 manorial districts with a combined population of 1.5 million. Some remnants of the old conditions did, however, continue to exist east of the Elbe River (East Elbia). There were many agricultural workers who received part of their wages in kind, such as free housing, food or land use. As late as 1928, 83% of the income of an average farm worker in East Prussia consisted of such wages; the figure was somewhat lower in Silesia and Pomerania. Employers preferred this form of pay because it tied workers more closely to them and made it difficult to verify the accuracy of their wages.

The situation was different in areas with a population made up predominantly of independent farmers. Even so, political misgivings in rural regions remained strong, as is shown by the emergence of rural protest parties such as the Christian-National Peasants' and Farmers' Party (CNBL) in 1928. In Schleswig-Holstein, which was characterized not by large landholdings but by small farmers, an agrarian protest movement developed toward the end of the 1920s with the Rural People's Movement.

==== Educational policy ====
The period of the grand coalition saw the beginning of a reform of the educational system that was initially pushed forward by the independent Minister of Education Carl Heinrich Becker. One of its goals was to reduce the educational disparity between urban and rural areas.

According to the Weimar Constitution, the training of elementary school teachers was to be aligned with that of the higher schools. How that was to be done was left a matter for the states. Some, such as Thuringia and Saxony, introduced teacher training at universities or technical universities. Others, including Bavaria and Württemberg, retained the old seminar method. In 1924, Prussia introduced a middle course using denominational pedagogic academies with a shorter training period than in a regular university course.

The government worked to promote secondary educational opportunities for gifted blue- and white-collar workers. In 1928, there were 102 adult education centres with 13,000 students. To support those with limited means who were eager to learn, a broad majority in the Landtag voted in favour of introducing 20,000 Reichsmarks in educational grants in 1928. One year later, the sum had reached 100,000 Reichsmarks, although additional increases were slowed by fiscal considerations, including on the part of the SPD.

The pupil-teacher ratio was reduced from 55 students per teacher in 1911 to 38 in 1928. Personnel costs, which placed a heavy burden on the state budget, led the SPD at times to limit educational expenditures in opposition to its stated goals.

==== Landtag election 1928 ====
1928 Landtag Election (parties that won seats)
| Party | Pct. of votes | Seats | + / - vs. 1924 |
|---|---|---|---|
| SPD | 29.0 | 137 | 23 |
| DNVP | 17.4 | 82 | -27 |
| Centre | 14.5 | 68 | -13 |
| KPD | 11.9 | 56 | 12 |
| DVP | 8.5 | 40 | -5 |
| WP | 4.5 | 21 | 10 |
| DDP | 4.5 | 21 | -6 |
| CNBL | 1.5 | 8 | New |
| NSDAP | 1.8 | 6 | -5 |
| DHP | 1.0 | 4 | -2 |
| VRP | 1.3 | 2 | New |
| Volkisch National Bloc (VNP) | 1.1 | 2 | New |
| Centre (Lower Saxony) | 0.7 | 3 | New |

In May 1928, elections were held at both the national and state levels. In the Prussian state election, the SPD made gains while the Centre and DDP both lost seats. In spite of that, the coalition had a parliamentary majority, with 228 of 450 seats. The government remained the same, and Braun promised to continue his work. One of the government's projects was to be a municipal reorganization of the Ruhr region.

==== Religious politics ====
As the election campaign of 1918/19 had shown, the memory of imperial Prussia's Kulturkampf ('cultural conflict') against the Catholic Church was still alive, but due in large part to the strong position of the Centre Party in the Landtag and the government, the Catholic population had come to identify relatively strongly with the new Free State of Prussia. Its high point and symbol was the Prussian Concordat with the Vatican, signed on 14 June 1929 by Eugenio Pacelli (later Pope Pius XII). The treaty superseded an 1821 agreement between the Kingdom of Prussia and the Vatican and eliminated the last remnants of church legislation from the Kulturkampf period. It regulated state contributions to the church and the arrangement of bishoprics, including reestablishing the bishoprics of Aachen and Berlin. School issues were excluded, but they regulated the academic training of clergy. The forms of episcopal elections and similar issues were also clarified.

There was opposition to the Concordat from various sides. The Lutheran Church, supported by the DNVP and DVP, saw it as strengthening Catholicism. Freethinkers in the SPD also rejected the agreement.

While the Catholic population was successfully won over to the new Prussia, the issue was more difficult when it came to Protestants. With the revolution, the Protestants of the Prussian Union of Churches lost the king of Prussia as their leader. He had officially been the head bishop (summus episcopus) of the Union with far-reaching rights, extending even to the shaping of the liturgy. Emperor Wilhelm II had taken the task very seriously, and after the revolution, many Protestants lacked an important figure by which to orient themselves. A considerable percentage of church-going Protestants voted for the anti-democratic and nationalistic DNVP. It was no coincidence that the motto of the Protestant church congress of 1927 was "Volk und Vaterland". Antisemitic influences, especially among theological faculties, also grew in strength.

An ecclesiastical treaty with the Protestant regional churches in Prussia did not come about until 1931. On the state's side, it was promoted by Adolf Grimme (SPD), who had become minister of Culture. A "political clause" that regulated the state's objections to the filling of high church positions, similar to the Concordat with the Catholic Church, met with resistance from the church.

=== Prussia and the crisis of the Republic ===
==== Blood May 1929 ====
Using sometimes drastic measures, the Prussian government tried to oppose the increasing radicalization from both the Left and the Right. In December 1928, following political clashes between Communists, National Socialists and Social Democrats in Berlin, the city's police chief Karl Zörgiebel issued a ban on all open-air demonstrations and gatherings. The ban applied to 1 May 1929, International Workers' Day. The KPD ignored the ban and called for a mass demonstration. Fighting broke out between the police and KPD supporters. Zörgiebel had ordered a crackdown and, with the SPD's approval, was determined to set an example. The fighting – which came to be known as "Blood May" – cost 33 lives, nearly 200 people were hurt and more than 1,200 arrests were made. The Prussian government pressed for a ban of the KPD and all its subsidiary organizations. Carl Severing, who at the time was German Minister of the Interior, rejected the idea as unwise and impracticable. Prussia then banned the Alliance of Red Front Fighters (Roter Frontkämpferbund), a paramilitary group affiliated with the KPD. With the exception of Brunswick, the other German states did the same.

The events led to increased hostility in the KPD towards the Social Democrats. Ernst Thälmann, leader of the KPD, called the "social fascism" of the SPD a particularly dangerous form of fascism. He urged the KPD to direct its policies against the SPD as the "main enemy".

==== Bulwark of democracy ====
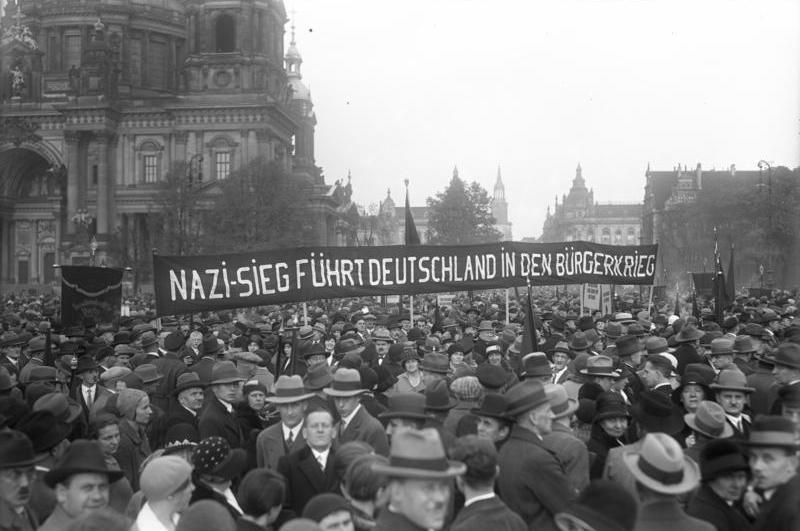
Anti-Nazi march of the SPD in Berlin, 1930. The sign reads: "Nazi victory will lead Germany to a civil war."

Heinrich Brüning of the Centre Party, who went on to lead the first of the Weimar Republic's presidential cabinets, became chancellor on 31 March 1930; in the Reichstag election of 14 September 1930, the Nazi Party went from just 12 to 107 seats and became the second largest party behind the SPD. In spite of those challenges, Prussia's government continued to work for democracy and the Republic. The ban on uniforms for the NSDAP was not lifted, nor was the provision that civil servants could not belong to the anti-constitutional KPD or NSDAP. In a sign of the crisis, Severing returned as Prussia's minister of the Interior in October 1930. He named his predecessor, Albert Grzesinski as Berlin's chief of police. Braun, Severing and chairman of the SPD parliamentary group Ernst Heilmann supported the SPD's course of tolerating Brüning due to the lack of political alternatives.

The National Socialists saw Prussia as an important strategic target in taking over power in Germany. Joseph Goebbels wrote in 1930, "The key to power in Germany lies in Prussia. Whoever has Prussia also has the Reich." Others on the Right saw the situation similarly. Brüning temporarily blocked cooperation with Prussia in its fight against the NSDAP. In December 1931, the Brüning government prevented the execution of an arrest warrant against Adolf Hitler issued by Berlin police chief Grzesinski. The Prussian government then presented the national government with an extensive dossier proving the anti-constitutional activities of the NSDAP and announced a ban on the Sturmabteilung (SA) in Prussia. Only after such pressure did Brüning also support the ban of all paramilitary units of the NSDAP throughout Germany.

==== Referendum on the dissolution of the Landtag ====
In 1929, the Braun government banned the paramilitary Stahlhelm in the Rhineland and Westphalia for violating the demilitarization provisions of the Treaty of Versailles. In 1930, when the Young Plan on German reparations came into force and foreign troops were to evacuate the Rhineland, German President Paul von Hindenburg, who was an honorary member of the Stahlhelm, forced the ban to be lifted by threatening to not take part in the celebrations in Koblenz to mark the evacuation.

On 4 October 1930, Stahlhelm leader Franz Seldte sharply attacked the "Marxist" Prussian government at the Front-Line Soldiers' Day in Koblenz. He announced a plan to call a referendum for the premature dissolution of the Prussian Landtag. The Stahlhelm's move was supported by the DVP, DNVP and NSDAP, and 5.96 million Prussians signed the initiative to put the referendum on the ballot, slightly more than the necessary 20% of eligible voters. Under pressure from Joseph Stalin and the Comintern, which at the time considered the fight against the "social-fascist" SPD more important than resistance to the extreme Right, the KPD also supported the referendum. Especially because many Communist voters did not follow the party's lead, the referendum on 9 August 1931 failed due to low voter turnout. The tally showed 9.8 million votes in favor, which was 93.9% of those who had voted but only 37.1% of eligible voters. 13.4 million votes, or more than 50% of eligible voters, were needed.

==== Landtag election 1932 ====
1932 Landtag Election (parties that won seats)
| Party | Pct. of votes | Seats | +/– vs. 1928 |
|---|---|---|---|
| NSDAP | 36.7 | 162 | +156 |
| SPD | 21.2 | 94 | -43 |
| Centre | 15.3 | 67 | -4 |
| KPD | 12.9 | 57 | +1 |
| DNVP | 7.0 | 31 | -51 |
| DVP | 1.7 | 7 | -35 |
| DStP | 1.5 | 2 | -19 |
| CSVD | 1.2 | 2 | New |
| DHP | 0.3 | 1 | -3 |

Elections in Prussia and several other states were scheduled to be held after the German presidential election of 1932 in which Hindenburg, supported by the German State Party (formerly the DDP), the Centre and the SPD, prevailed over Hitler and Ernst Thälmann (KPD). Since Prussia's coalition parties had to assume that the democratic camp would fare badly in view of Germany's increasing political radicalization, the Landtag's rules of procedure were changed at the instigation of Ernst Heilmann, chairman of the SPD parliamentary group. A preliminary form of a constructive vote of no confidence was introduced to prevent the minister president from being voted out of office by a purely negative majority – one without sufficient votes to elect a prospective successor. From then on, an absolute majority was required for the election of the minister president.

The coalition parties' fears about the 1932 Prussian election were justified. The SPD dropped from 29.0% to 21.2% of the vote, while the NSDAP grew from 1.8% to 36.7% and became the strongest parliamentary group. The coalition parties had only 163 seats, or 38%, whereas the KPD and NSDAP, with 219, had a negative majority. The National Socialist Hanns Kerrl became president of the Landtag. The government resigned but remained in office on a caretaker basis until a new minister president could be elected.

The attempt to form a new majority government proved unsuccessful. There were negotiations between the Centre and the NSDAP, but the configuration, which Severing and Braun considered to be a possibility, failed. Nor could a majority be found to again revise the amended rules of procedure. It thus seemed possible that the caretaker government could continue on indefinitely. Ernst Heilmann in particular tried to convince the KPD to tolerate it. Since the KPD had weakened its stance against social fascism in favor of a united front, the attempt had at least some chance at success, but in the end it too failed.

Braun had a physical collapse on the night of 22–23 April due to the exertions of the election campaign. When it became clear that his caretaker government would remain in office, he handed over day-to-day affairs to his deputy Heinrich Hirtsiefer of the Centre Party.

==== 1932 Prussian coup d'état (Preußenschlag) ====
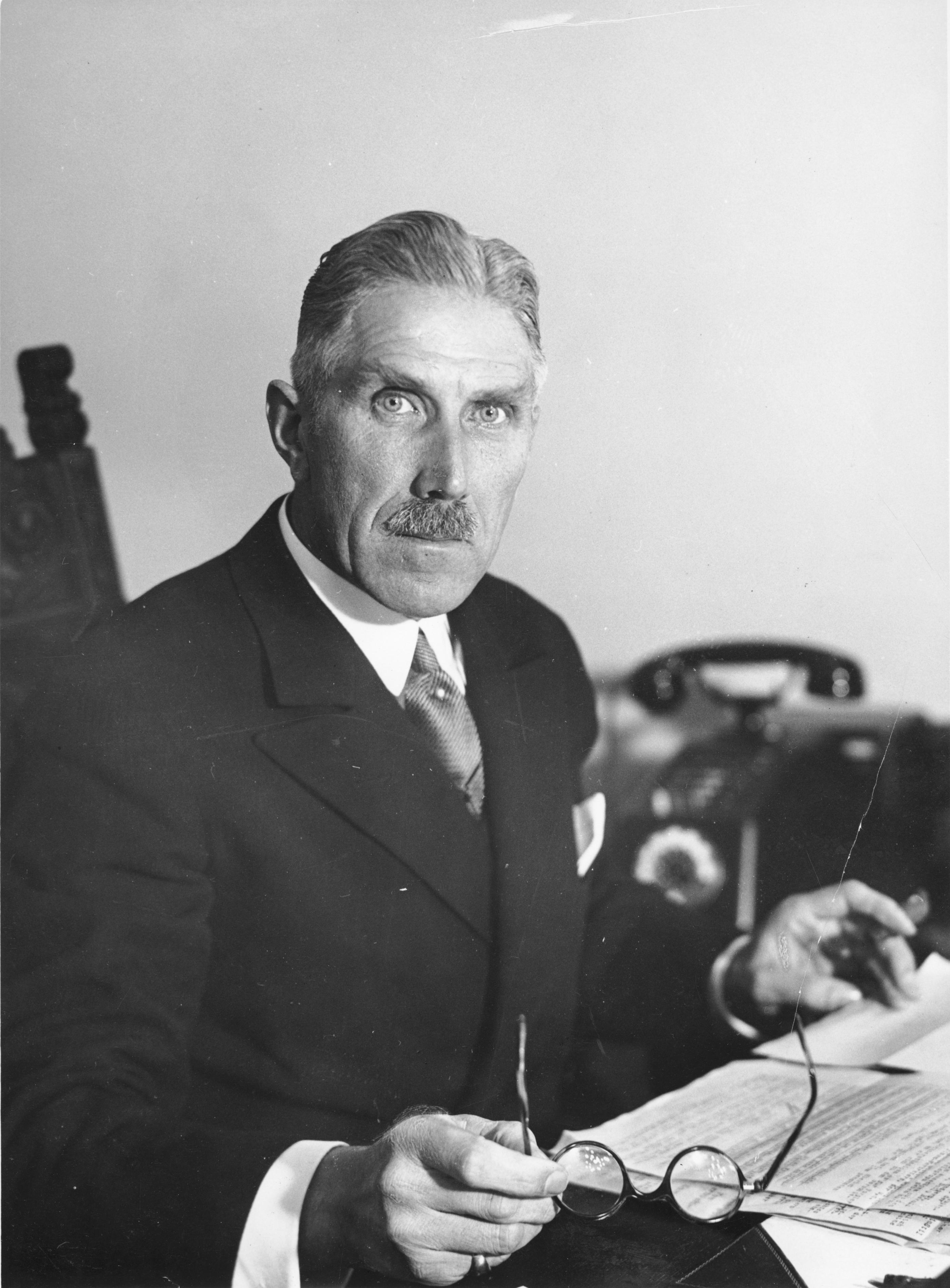
Franz von Papen, the German chancellor who initiated the Prussian coup d'état

The cabinet of German Chancellor Franz von Papen exerted pressure behind the scenes to quickly elect a new minister president based on cooperation between the NSDAP and the Centre. Coalition negotiations took place, but the Centre was unwilling to elect a National Socialist minister president. On 11 June 1932, the Papen government warned that it would appoint a Reich commissioner for Prussia if the situation was not resolved. The threat was made real after 18 people died on 17 July in violent clashes between supporters of the KPD, NSDAP and members of the police in Altona, which was then a part of Prussia. Three days after the Altona Bloody Sunday, President Hindenburg used his emergency powers under Article 48 of the Weimar Constitution to relieve the members of the Prussian State Ministry of their posts and appoint Papen Reich commissioner for Prussia. Franz Bracht of the Centre Party was named his deputy and replaced Carl Severing as minister of the Interior.

A state of emergency was declared in Berlin and the Province of Brandenburg. The police were placed under the command of General Gerd von Rundstedt, and high-ranking leaders of the police were arrested. Papen and Bracht immediately began removing leading civil servants and other executives who were close to the parties of the Braun government and replacing them with conservative officials. There was no active resistance, such as a general strike called by the SPD and trade unions. In order to avoid provoking a civil war, the SPD's executive board had decided on 16 July not to oppose Papen with the resources available to it.

In the words of Weimar historian Heinrich August Winkler:

The dismissal of Braun's caretaker government ended an unusual chapter in the history of Prussia. After 1918, the most reliable supporter of the Republic among all the German states was the one that emerged from the Hohenzollern domains. The old Prussia had not disappeared, but the political scene was controlled by the three Weimar coalition parties until the spring of 1932. Immediately after the Preußenschlag, the great cleansing began.

On the day of the Prussian coup d'état, the caretaker government filed suit with the Reich Constitutional Court in Leipzig. Hermann Heller represented the SPD parliamentary group and Carl Schmitt the German government. On 25 October 1932, the court determined that the removal of the Prussian government had been illegal. The caretaker government was given the right to represent Prussia before the state's Landtag, the State Council, the Reichsrat and the other states. The judges also ruled that a "temporary" appointment of Reich commissioners was constitutional. As a result, Prussia effectively had two governments: the Braun government, which had no access to the administrative apparatus, and the Reich commissioner's office, which controlled the government resources that wielded power.

After the de facto dismissal of the Braun government, Joseph Goebbels summed up the situation in his diary: "The Reds have been eliminated. Their organizations offer no resistance. [...] The Reds have had their great hour. They will never come again."

== National Socialist era (1933–1945) ==
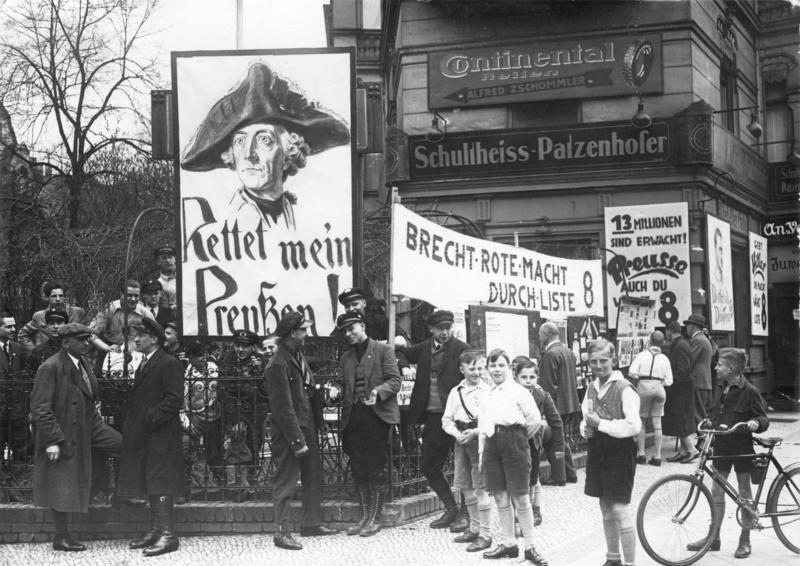
Nazi campaign posters in Berlin, 1932. They read: "Save my Prussia!" (under a picture of Frederick the Great) and "Break Red power through List 8".

Service flag of Prussia, 1933–1935

After Adolf Hitler became German chancellor on 30 January 1933, he named Hermann Göring Reich commissioner of the Interior for Prussia. In a departure from the previous arrangement, the office of Reich commissioner itself was assumed not by the chancellor but by the vice chancellor, Franz von Papen. The replacement of politically undesirable officials was pushed forward more aggressively. The Prussian police force, subordinate to Göring, was an important element in enforcing National Socialist rule. The Gestapo grew out of the Prussian political police.

To clear the way for the dissolution of the Landtag, President Paul von Hindenburg issued an emergency decree on 6 February removing Minister President Braun from office. In accordance with the Prussian Constitution, a three-member body consisting of Papen (in place of the minister president), Hanns Kerrl of the NSDAP (Landtag president) and Konrad Adenauer (president of the State Council) were to decide whether to dissolve the Landtag. Adenauer opposed the move and refused to participate. Papen and Kerrl then decided that it should be dissolved.

The Reichstag Fire Decree, issued the day after the Reichstag fire of 27 February 1933, not only suspended numerous fundamental rights nationwide and intensified the persecution of political opponents but also allowed the Hitler cabinet to take over state governments.

The new Reich government pushed to end Braun's caretaker government. In the election for the Prussian Landtag on 5 March, the NSDAP won the most votes at 43.2%. Although it did not achieve a majority, it made significant gains even in Catholic regions. Since the National Socialists, despite gains, also did not have a majority in many cities after the municipal elections of 12 March 1933, the takeover of power was achieved through political manipulation. The Prussian Municipal Constitution Act of 15 December 1933 replaced elected municipal parliaments with appointed municipal councils.

1933 Landtag Election (parties that won seats)
| Party | Pct. of votes | Seats | +/– vs. 1932 |
|---|---|---|---|
| NSDAP | 43.2 | 211 | +49 |
| SPD | 16.6 | 80 | -14 |
| Centre | 14.2 | 68 | +1 |
| KPD | 13.2 | 63 | +6 |
| DNVP (as KSWR) | 8.9 | 43 | +12 |
| DVP | 2.1 | 8 | +1 |
| CSVD | 0.9 | 3 | +1 |
| DStP | 0.7 | 3 | +1 |
| DHP | 0.2 | 2 | +1 |

The new Prussian Landtag was constituted on 22 March 1933. At the national level, the mandates of the Communist deputies were revoked and many of them were arrested. As a result, the NSDAP had an absolute majority (211 of 418 seats). The Landtag confirmed the dismissal of the Braun government, which then resigned. The Landtag did not elect a new minister president. The Provisional Law and Second Law on the Coordination of the States with the Reich of 31 March and 7 April 1933 subordinated Prussia to the Reich. On 11 April, Hitler appointed Göring Prussian minister president, and the Landtag met for the last time on 18 May 1933. It approved an enabling act that transferred all legislative power to the Reich Ministry of State for a period of four years and then adjourned. The SPD alone refused to go along. The act meant the end of a democratic system in Prussia.

Under the Nazi regime, the structures of the state were increasingly eroded. Utilizing the authority of the enabling act, Göring enacted a law on 8 July 1933 abolishing the existing Prussian State Council, the chamber of the legislature that represented the interests of the Prussian provinces. In its place, he created a non-legislative Nazi Prussian State Council to serve him in an advisory capacity. Göring himself was president of the Council. It consisted of the Prussian cabinet ministers and state secretaries, plus certain Nazi Party officials and other leaders of industry and society selected by Göring.

The "First Ordinance for the Unification and Simplification of Administration" of 19 July 1934 effectively merged state ministries with Reich ministries. In the "Law on the Reconstruction of the Reich" of 30 January 1934 and the "Reich Governors Law" of 30 January 1935, the states and the provinces of Prussia were dissolved in fact if not in law. The state Landtags were abolished and state governments were controlled by Reichsstatthalter (Reich governors) who were appointed by the chancellor. The law designated Hitler himself as the Reich governor of Prussia, although he delegated the functions to Göring. By the "Law on the Abolition of the Reichsrat" of 14 February 1934, the states lost their representation to the Reichsrat, upper chamber of the German parliament.

The new rulers were quite successful in appealing to Prussian traditions of discipline and devotion to the state. They were able to connect with trends of the 1920s from the right wing of the political spectrum, in which the Prussia of Frederick the Great and Otto von Bismarck and their "Prussian socialism" were compared favorably to liberalism and social democracy. Prussian administrative efficiency was misused for coercive and terrorist rule. In the Prussian-influenced officer corps, only a few, citing Prussia as their reason, refused to support Hitler.

A few changes were made to the Prussian provinces under the Nazi regime. The Greater Hamburg Act of 1937 transferred some territory from the provinces of Hanover and Schleswig-Holstein to Hamburg while at the same time annexing Geesthacht (part of Hamburg) and Lübeck to Schleswig-Holstein, as well as Cuxhaven (Hamburg) to the Province of Hanover. Other changes took place in 1939 involving cessions of suburban municipalities of Hanover to Bremen and in return the annexation of Bremerhaven to the Province of Hanover. Wilhelmshaven (Hanover) was ceded to Oldenburg in 1937.

The Prussian lands transferred to Poland after the Treaty of Versailles were reannexed during World War II. Most of the territory was not reintegrated into Prussia but assigned to separate territories of Nazi Germany.

== Formal dissolution (1945–1947) ==
At the end of World War II in 1945, Germany was divided into occupation zones, and all of Germany east of the Oder–Neisse line was ceded to other countries. As had been the case after World War I, almost all of the territory had been Prussian, although a small portion east of the new border had belonged to Saxony. Most of the land went to Poland, ostensibly as compensation for the seizure of Poland's eastern territories by the Soviet Union. The northern third of East Prussia, including Königsberg (renamed Kaliningrad in 1946), was annexed by the Soviets. The losses represented nearly two-fifths of Prussian territory and nearly a quarter of the territory within Germany's pre-1938 borders. An estimated twelve million Germans fled or were forcibly expelled from the territories.

What remained of Prussia comprised both a little over half of the remaining German territory and a little over half of Prussia's pre-1914 territory. Control Council Law No. 46 of 25 February 1947 explicitly decreed that Prussia should be dissolved. The Allies cited Prussia's history of militarism as a reason for dissolving it. Its reconstitution was also opposed (if not for the same reasons) by powerful German postwar politicians, especially the first West German chancellor, Konrad Adenauer.

Growing tensions between the Western Allies and the Soviet Union eventually resulted in the Prussian territories west of the Oder-Neisse line being further divided by what became known as the inner German border. The lands east of this boundary (except West Berlin) became part of the German Democratic Republic (East Germany) and the remainder became part of the Federal Republic of Germany (West Germany).

=== Post-war dismemberment ===
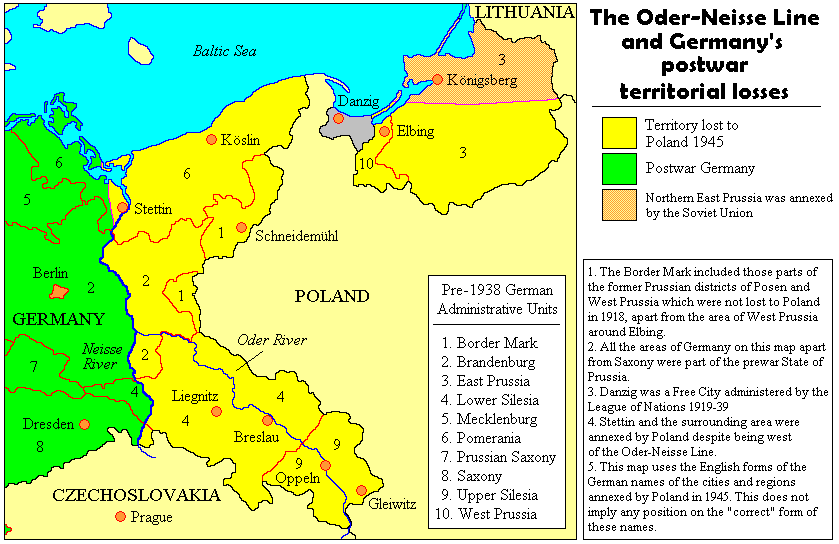
German territorial losses in the east following World War II. All areas of Germany on the map, except for Saxony and Mecklenburg, had been part of the Free State of Prussia.

After the Allied occupation of Germany in 1945, the provinces of Prussia were split up into the following territories/German states:

Ceded to the Soviet Union
The northern third of East Prussia including Königsberg. Today, the Kaliningrad Oblast is a Russian exclave between Lithuania and Poland.

Ceded to Poland
Everything east of the Oder–Neisse line plus Stettin (now Szczecin). This included most of Lower Silesia (now the Lower Silesian Voivodeship) and its capital Breslau (now Wroclaw), Upper Silesia (now the Opole Voivodeship), Eastern Pomerania (now the West Pomeranian Voivodeship), the Neumark region of Brandenburg (now the Lubusz Voivodeship), all of Posen–West Prussia (now mostly part of the Greater Poland Voivodeship), and the portion of East Prussia not ceded to Russia (now the Warmian-Masurian Voivodeship).

Placed under Soviet administration
The following states, after merging with other German states, were formed after the war, then abolished in 1952 and finally recreated following the reunification of Germany in 1990:

- Brandenburg, from the remainder of the Province of Brandenburg.
- Saxony-Anhalt, from the bulk of the Province of Saxony. The remainder of the province became part of Thuringia.
- Mecklenburg-Vorpommern: the remainder of the Province of Pomerania (most of Western Pomerania) merged into Mecklenburg.
- Saxony: the remainder of the Province of Silesia merged into Saxony.

Placed under Allied administration
The remainder of Prussia was merged with other German states to become the following states of West Germany:

- Schleswig-Holstein, from the Province of Schleswig-Holstein (under British administration).
- Lower Saxony, from the Province of Hanover (under British administration).
- North Rhine-Westphalia, from the Province of Westphalia and the northern half of the Rhine Province (under British administration).
- Rhineland-Palatinate, from the southern part of the Rhine Province (under French administration).
- Hesse, from the Province of Hesse-Nassau (under American administration).
- Württemberg-Hohenzollern, from the Province of Hohenzollern and the southern half of the former state of Württemberg (under French administration). It ultimately became part of Baden-Württemberg in 1952.

Berlin
Divided into East Berlin under Soviet administration and West Berlin under Allied sectors of administration (British, French and American). West Berlin was surrounded by East Germany and was enclosed by the Berlin Wall beginning in 1961. The two halves were reunited after German reunification to form the modern German state of Berlin. A proposal to merge Berlin with the reformed state of Brandenburg was rejected by popular vote in 1996.
