= Hertling cabinet (Prussia) =

Last Prussian State Ministry (1917–1918)

Hertling Cabinet
- Cabinet of the Kingdom of Prussia
- 1917–1918
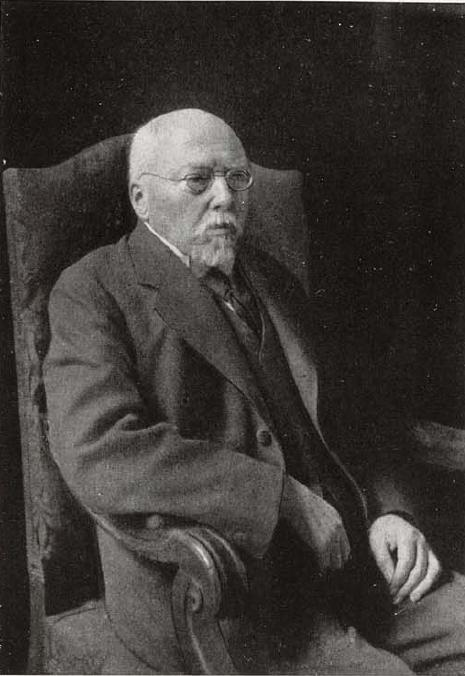
- Minister President Hertling
- Date formed: November 1, 1917
- Date dissolved: November 13, 1918 (1 year, 1 week and 5 days)

People and organisations
- King: William II
- Minister President: Georg von Hertling
- Deputy Prime Minister: Paul von Breitenbach; Robert Friedberg

History
- Predecessor: Michaelis cabinet
- Successor: Prussian Revolutionary cabinet

The Hertling Cabinet formed the last Prussian State Ministry appointed by King William II from November 1, 1917, to November 13, 1918. In the course of the November Revolution of 1918, the Prussian Revolutionary cabinet under Paul Hirsch (MSPD) and Heinrich Ströbel (USPD) took power in Prussia on November 12 and the State Ministry ended its activities.

== Cabinet members ==
Portfolio	Minister	Took office	Left office	Party
Minister President	Georg von Hertling	November 1, 1917	October 3, 1918	Centre
Minister President	Vacant	October 3, 1918	November 13, 1918	N/A
Deputy Prime Minister	Paul von Breitenbach	November 1, 1917	November 9, 1917	N/A
Deputy Prime Minister	Robert Friedberg	November 9, 1917	November 13, 1918	NLP
Minister of Foreign Affairs	Georg von Hertling	November 1, 1917	October 3, 1918	N/A
Minister of Foreign Affairs	Max von Baden	October 3, 1918	November 9, 1918	N/A
Minister of Finance	Oskar Hergt	November 1, 1917	November 7, 1918	DRP
Minister of Spiritual, Educational and Medical Affairs	Friedrich Schmidt	November 1, 1917	November 13, 1918	N/A
Minister of Justice	Peter Spahn	November 1, 1917	November 27, 1918	Centre
Minister of Trade and Commerce	Reinhold von Sydow	November 1, 1917	October 5, 1918	
Minister of Trade and Commerce	Otto Fischbeck	October 5, 1918	November 13, 1918	FVP
Minister of Public Works	Paul von Breitenbach	November 1, 1917	November 13, 1918	N/A
Minister of Interior Affairs	Bill Drews	November 1, 1917	November 13, 1918	N/A
Minister of War	Hermann von Stein	November 1, 1917	October 9, 1918	N/A
Minister of War	Heinrich Schëuch	October 9, 1918	January 2, 1919 (Note: As part of the Prussian Revolutionary cabinet from November 14, 1918.)	N/A
Minister of Agriculture, Domains and Forestry	Paul von Eisenhart-Rothe	November 1, 1917	November 13, 1918	N/A

== See also ==
- Prussian State Ministry
