= Kurt Rosenfeld =

German lawyer and politician (1877–1943)

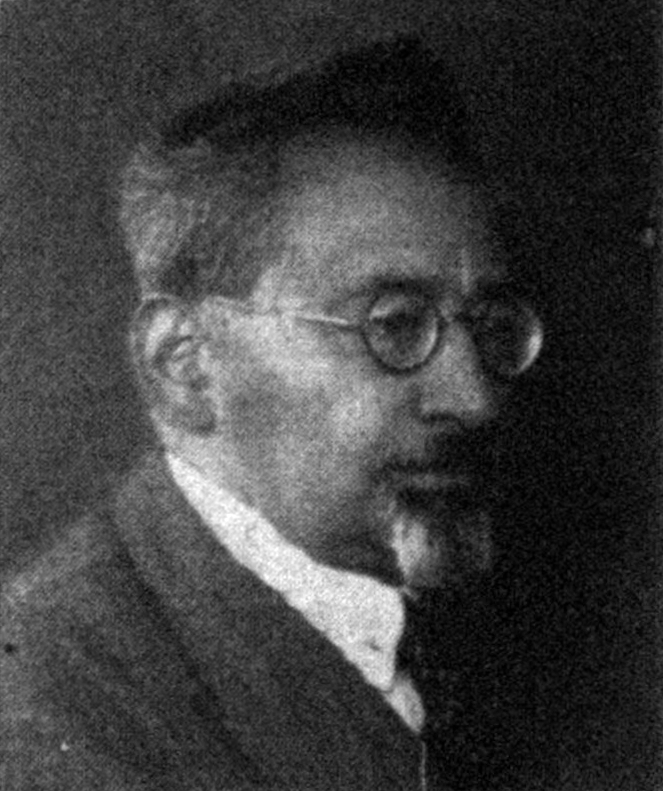
- Rosenfeld c. 1930

Chairman of the Socialist Workers' Party of Germany
- In office September 1931 – March 1933
- Serving with: Max Seydewitz; Heinrich Ströbel (1931–1932)
- Preceded by: Position established
- Succeeded by: Jacob Walcher (de facto)

Minister of Justice of the Free State of Prussia
- In office 12 November 1918 – 4 January 1919
- Minister-President: Paul Hirsch
- Serving with: Wolfgang Heine
- Preceded by: Peter Spahn
- Succeeded by: Wolfgang Heine
Parliamentary constituencies
Member of the Reichstag for Thuringia
In office 24 June 1920 – 31 July 1932
| Preceded by | Constituency established |
| Succeeded by | Multi-member district |
Member of the National Assembly for Thuringia
In office 3 May 1920 – 21 May 1920
| Preceded by | Emanuel Wurm |
| Succeeded by | Office abolished |
Member of the Prussian State Assembly
In office 13 March 1919 – 10 March 1921
| Preceded by | Office established |
| Succeeded by | Office abolished |

Personal details
- Born: 1 February 1877 Marienwerder, Province of Prussia, Kingdom of Prussia, German Empire
- Died: 25 September 1943 (aged 66) Queens, New York City, New York, U.S.
- Party: SPD (before 1917, 1922–1931); USPD (1917–1922); SAPD (1931–1933); KPD (after 1933)
- Education: University of Freiburg

Military service
- Allegiance: German Empire
- Years of service: 1914–1918
- Battles/wars: World War I

Kurt Rosenfeld (1 February 1877 – 25 September 1943) was a German lawyer and politician (SPD). He was a member of the national parliament ("Reichstag") between 1920 and 1932.

== Early life ==
Kurt Samuel Rosenfeld was born into a Jewish family at Marienwerder, a mid-sized town in what was then West Prussia and is now Kwidzyn in Poland. Between 1896 and 1899 he studied jurisprudence and social economics at Freiburg (where one of his teachers was Max Weber), then moving on to Berlin from where he graduated in 1905 with a doctorate in law. After this he took a job as a lawyer in Berlin. While still a student he joined the Social Democratic Party ("Sozialdemokratische Partei Deutschlands" / SPD).

== Political activity prior and during the First World War ==
Between 1910 and 1920 he served as a Berlin city councillor. For most of this time he was on the left wing of the SPD. He was also building a reputation as a trial lawyer: during this period he defended like-minded political comrades including Rosa Luxemburg, Kurt Eisner and Georg Ledebour. Other left wing Berlin politicians in his circle included Clara Zetkin, Karl Liebknecht, Franz Mehring, Karl Radek and Anton Pannekoek.

Between 5 August 1914 and 9 November 1918, Kurt Rosenfeld took part in the First World War as a soldier. He was nevertheless one of those in the SPD who had opposed the party leadership's 1914 decision to agree to a political truce at the outbreak of the war and, more specifically, to vote in favour of "war credits". As the scale of the human slaughter on the front line and the economic destitution on the home front mounted, the number of SPD politicians opposing the war increased, and it was primarily over this issue that the party split in 1917. Rosenfeld was among those who formed the breakaway faction, which later became the Independent Social Democratic Party of Germany ("Unabhängige Sozialdemokratische Partei Deutschlands" / USPD).

== German Revolution ==
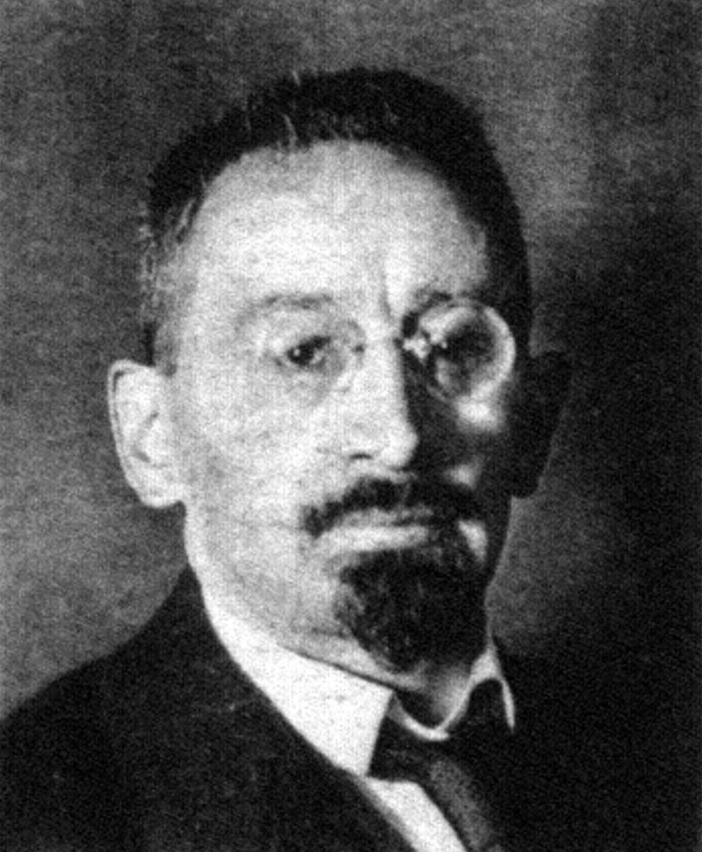
Rosenfeld's official Reichstag portrait, 1920

During the year of revolution that followed the war Rosenfeld served briefly, between November 1918 and January 1919, as Prussia's regional justice minister. In 1919 he was elected to the Prussian State Assembly ("Preußische Landesversammlung"), the body mandated to devise and enact a constitution for what was called at that point the Free State of Prussia ("Freistaat Preußen"). Developments in Prussia were replicated at a national level. The emperor had abdicated in November 1918, and a body known (because it was convened at Weimar) as the Weimar National Assembly was mandated to devise a new democratic constitution for a democratic state. Rosenfeld was co-opted to join the assembly on 3 May 1920, taking the place of Emanuel Wurm, a USPD member who had died. The constitutional assembly's work was by now almost concluded, but on 21 May it was dissolved, to be replaced by a national parliament ("Reichstag"). Rosenfeld was a USPD candidate at the general election two weeks later, and was elected, representing Electoral District 13 (Thuringia). He was now re-elected in successive elections, remaining a Reichstag member till 1932.

== SPD activism 1922-1931 ==
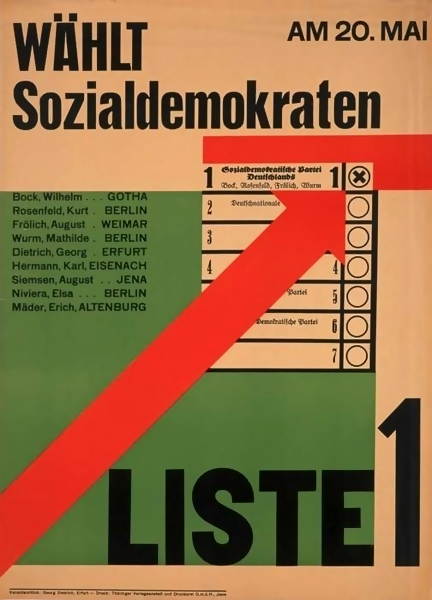
SPD election poster, 1928

The Independent Social Democratic Party of Germany ("Unabhängige Sozialdemokratische Partei Deutschlands" / USPD), having been the product of a split in 1917, itself broke apart at the end of 1920 when the majority joined the new German Communist Party. Kurt Rosenfeld was part of the minority that stayed within a much diminished USPD, but the arguments continued. Following the assassination of Walther Rathenau in 1922, many took the view that in the post-war context of economic destitution, the remnant USPD now had too much in common with the SPD to persist as a separate movement. Kurt Rosenfeld, Theodor Liebknecht and Georg Ledebour were the most high-profile USPD opponents of any political reunification, but when, in September 1922 the political parties nevertheless formally merged, Rosenfeld (unlike the other two) went along with the USPD majority.

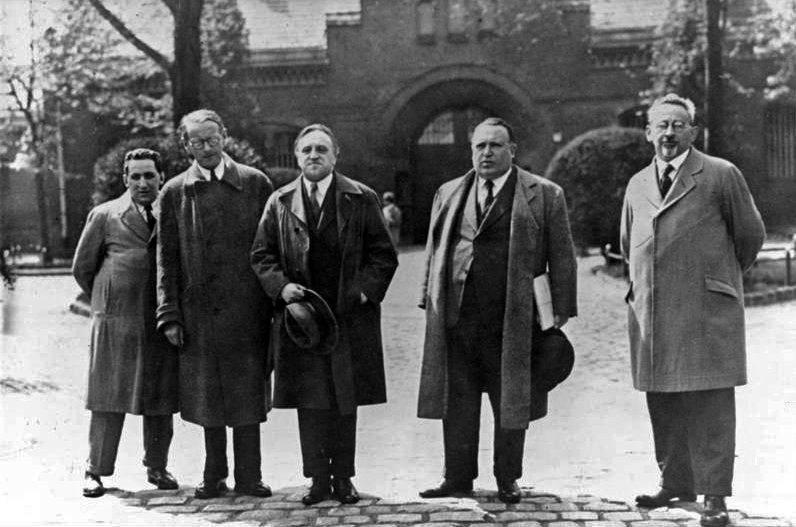
In front of the Berlin-Tegel Prison, 1932. From left to right: Kurt Grossmann, Rudolf Olden, Carl von Ossietzky, Alfred Apfel, and Kurt Rosenfeld

After 1922 Rosenfeld's was positioned firmly on the left wing of the SPD, together with colleagues such as Paul Levi and Max Seydewitz. From 1927 he was one of the SPD left wingers producing "Klassenkampf" (Class Struggle"), a rather theoretical Marxist journal published under the auspices of the SPD. As the political temperature rose in the later 1920s, Rosenfeld was one of those urging closer collaboration between the SPD and the Communists as a way to counter the growing menace of right wing demagoguery. In March 1931 he was one of the left wing Reichstag members who voted against the naval budget. He also continued to work as a leading defence attorney. Of particular note was his defence of Carl von Ossietzky in the 1931 Weltbühne case.

== Socialist Workers' Party activism 1931-1933 ==
In 1931 Rosenfeld was one of six left-wing SPD members of parliament excluded from the SPD group in the Reichstag following a "breach of party discipline". At the heart of the disagreement was the decision of the party leadership under Otto Wels to "tolerate" the Brüning government, in a desperate - and with the benefit of hindsight unsuccessful - attempt to "stabilize the tottering state" and avert a Nazi take-over. Rosenfeld and fellow-expellee Max Seydewitz now founded the Socialist Workers' Party ("Sozialistische Arbeiterpartei Deutschlands" / SAPD). Rosenfeld and Seydewitz became co-chairmen of the new party serving, in Rosenfeld's case, till the early part of 1933.

== In exile ==
Early in 1933 Rosenfeld resigned from the SAPD and called on fellow members to link up with the Communist Party. However, the political backdrop had been transformed in January 1933 when the Nazi Party took power and converted Germany into a one-party dictatorship. At the end of February the Reichstag fire was instantly blamed on the Communists, and in March 1933 Communist members were expelled from the Reichstag which was in any case rendered irrelevant by enabling legislation that allowed the government to rule without parliamentary consent. Communists began to be arrested: Kurt Rosenfeld was one of those who managed to escape to Paris which was rapidly becoming the informal headquarters of the German Communist Party in exile. He set up a Paris-based anti-fascist press agency called "Agence Impress". In Germany the Reichstag fire in February 1933 was quickly followed by a trial which was given maximum publicity by the Nazi government in order to blacken the reputation of the Communists and provide justification for the post-democratic changes that the government had implemented. Outside Germany a number of political refugees organised an alternative "counter-trial" in London which took place in September 1933, and concluded that the real perpetrators of the Reichstag fire had been the Nazi elite. Kurt Rosenfeld was one of those involved in the London "counter-trial" which received much press coverage in English-speaking parts of the world. However, by the end of 1934 he had settled not in London but in the United States where he worked closely with exiled German communists. It seems likely that at some stage he himself joined the exiled German Communist Party.

In the US he was able to do some work as a lawyer. He also teamed up with Gerhart Eisler to produce, from 1941, a German language news journal "The German-American". He also became president of the "German American Emergency Committee/Conference", which was part of a wider campaign to unite German and German-speaking opponents to the Hitler regime across the American continent. In 1943 he also became honorary president of the Latin American Committee of a Free Germany. However, in September 1943 he died at his home in Queens, New York.
