= Eugen Ernst =

German politician (1864–1954)

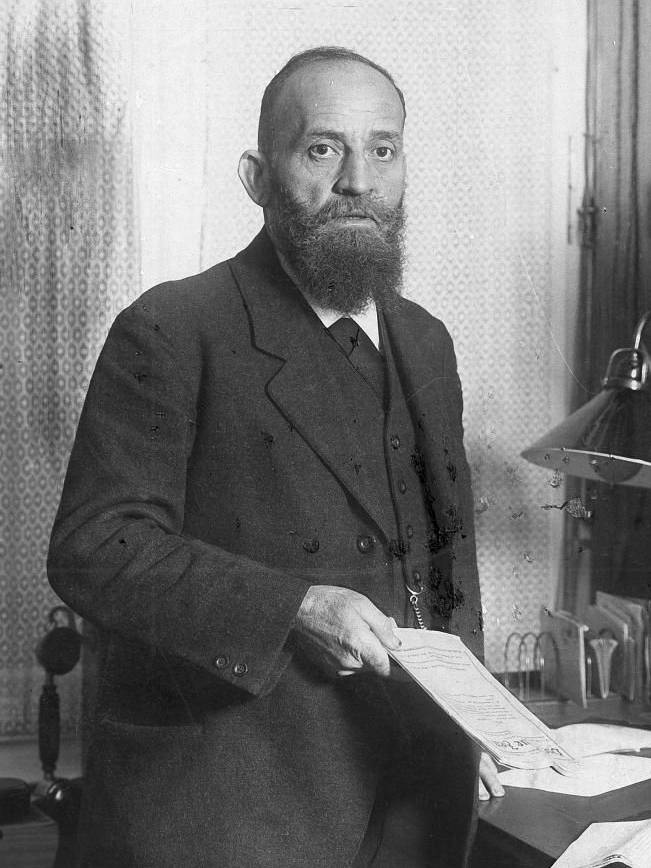
- Ernst in 1918

Chairman of the SPD commission in Prussia
- In office 1907–1918

Prussian Minister of the Interior / Minister without portfolio
- In office 14 November 1918 – 25 March 1919

Member of the National Assembly
- In office January 1919 – June 1920
- Constituency: Berlin 3

President of the Police of Berlin
- In office 4 January 1919 – April 1920

President of the Police of Breslau
- In office May 1920 – September 1920

Town councillor of Werder (Havel)
- In office 1926–1933

Personal details
- Born: 20 September 1864 Murowana Goslin, Province of Posen, Prussia (Murowana Goślina, Poland)
- Died: 31 May 1954 (aged 89) Werder (Havel), East Germany
- Party: Social Democratic Party of Germany (SPD); Socialist Unity Party of Germany (SED)
- Occupation: typesetter

Eugen Oswald Gustav Ernst (20 September 1864 – 31 May 1954) was a German Social Democrat and Socialist politician. His appointment as President of the Police of Berlin in January 1919 prompted the Spartacist uprising in Berlin.

== Biography ==
Eugen Ernst was born in Murowana-Goslin, Province of Posen, Prussia (now Murowana Goślina, Poland). His father was a carpenter, he attended school in Werder (Havel), was trained as a typesetter and worked for a book printer until 1892.

Ernst joined the bookprinters union in 1884 and became a member of the Social Democratic Party of Germany (SPD) in 1884 or 1886. He soon held several positions as a party official and was the chairman of the intraparty oppositional "Youth" from 1891 to 1893. He served as the SPD's steward for the constituency of Berlin 6 from 1897 to 1900 and again from 1902 to 1905. In 1902/1903 he was the business executive of the social democrat Vorwärts printing house and its custodian from 1903 to 1918. From 1900 to 1901 and 1917 to 1919, Ernst was a member of the SPD's party board. Ernst was chairman of the Prussian SPD commission from 1907 to 1918 and headed the SPD electoral committee for Greater Berlin from 1915 to 1917.

In November 1918, Ernst became a member of the workers' and soldiers' council of Greater Berlin. He is either described as Minister of the Interior or Minister without portfolio in the Prussian Council of the People's Deputies under Paul Hirsch.

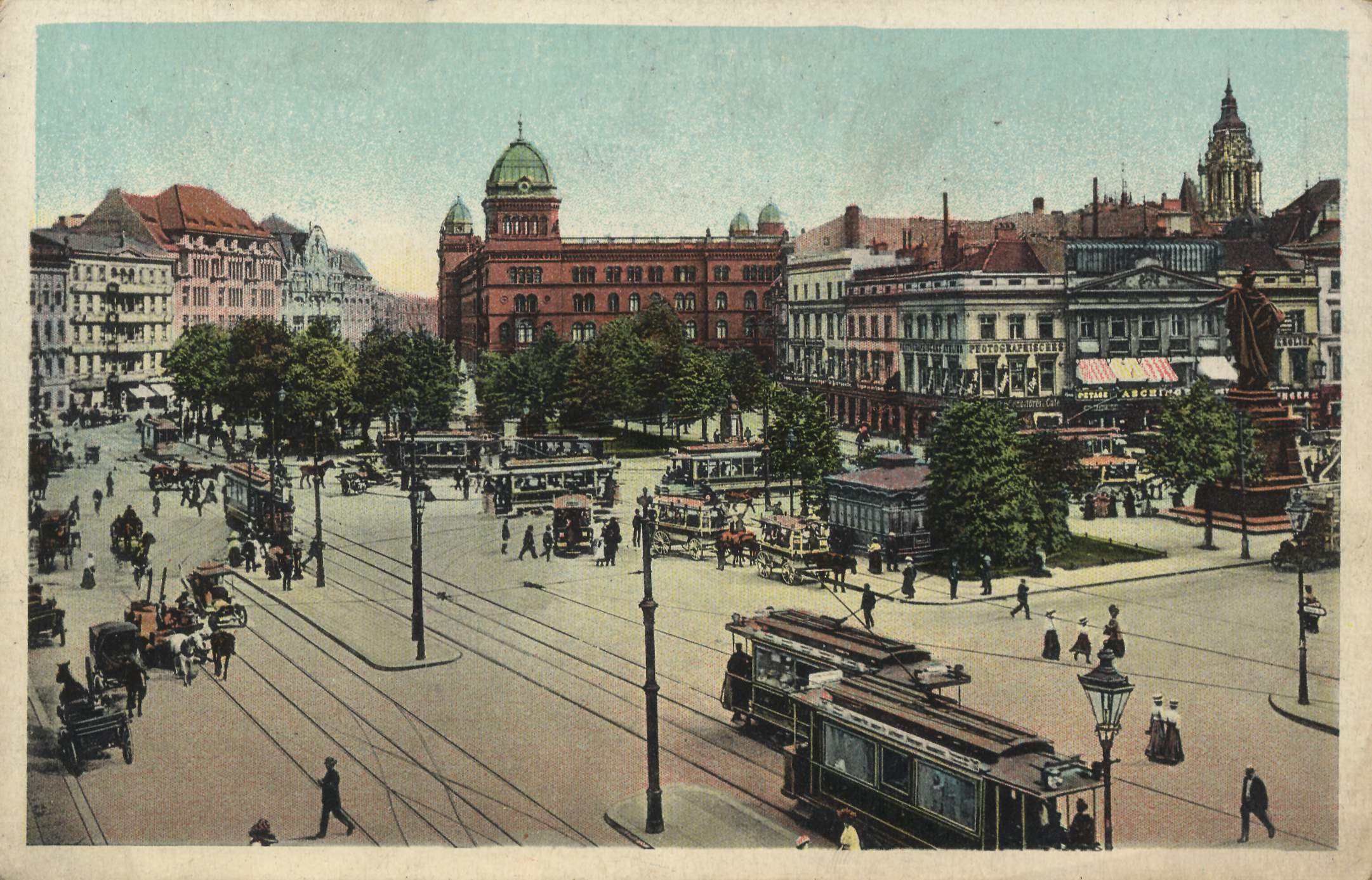
The "Red Castle", headquarters of the Berlin Police at Alexanderplatz

On 4 January 1919, after the Independent Social Democratic (USPD) members of the Prussian Council of the People's deputies had left the people's council, Ernst was appointed President of the Police of Berlin by the Prussian government. His predecessor, Emil Eichhorn, was the last member of the USPD holding an influential position in Berlin. Eichhorn, who worked for the Russian Telegraph Agency in Berlin, had supported the Volksmarinedivision in the Christmas crisis of December 1918 and was dismissed from his post with the approval of the Central Workers and Soldiers council. Eichhorn however refused to accept his dismissal and kept his office at Berlin's police headquarters. He was supported by armed groups of revolutionaries when Ernst appeared at the Police headquarter at Alexanderplatz. The following day a large protest demonstration against the dismissal of Eichhorn was organized by several left-wing groups, which led to the Spartacist uprising.

In the 1919 German federal election Ernst was elected as a member of the Weimar National Assembly representing the Berlin 3 constituency.

Ernst was criticized for his inactivity as the head of Berlin's Police forces during the Kapp Putsch of March 1920 and lost his position as Berlin's President of the Police in April 1920.

In May 1920 Ernst became President of the Police of Breslau, but was dismissed in September 1920 after local protesters had attacked the French and the Polish consulate in Breslau on 26 August 1920. From 1926 to 1933, he was town councilor in Werder (Havel).

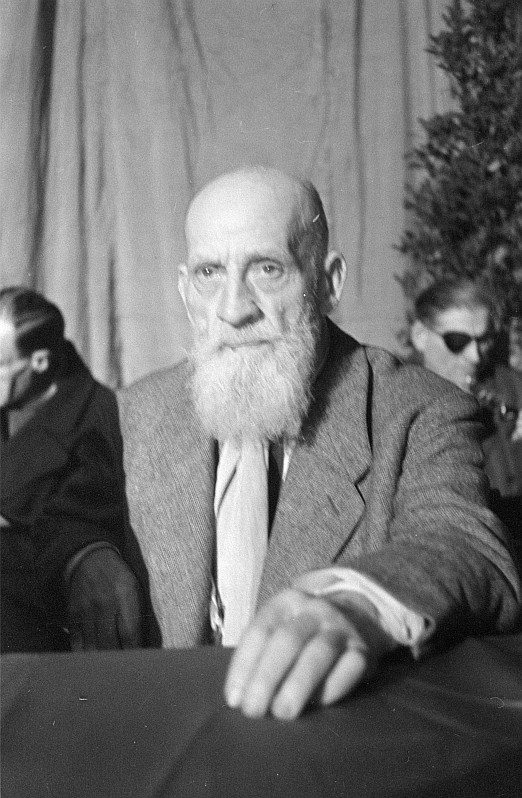
Ernst in 1946

After World War II Ernst rejoined the Social Democratic Party, which was merged with the Communist Party in 1946. He participated in the unification conference of April 1946 but did not play any political role at that time. Ernst died in 1954 in Werder.

== Publications ==
- Polizeispitzeleien und Ausnahmegesetze, 1878–1910, Berlin, 1911
- Ein Leben für die Arbeiterbewegung, 1946

== See also ==
- History of the Social Democratic Party of Germany
