= 1919 Prussian state election =

- 26 January 1919
- All 401 seats in the State Assembly; 201 seats needed for a majority
- Turnout: 74.8%
Party	Vote %	Seats
Social Democratic Party	36.4%	145
Centre Party	22.2%	93
German Democratic Party	16.2%	65
German National People's Party	11.2%	48
Independent Social Democratic Party	7.4%	24
German People's Party	5.7%	23
German-Hanoverian Party	0.5%	2
Schleswig-Holstein Farmers' Democracy	0.4%	1
This lists parties that won seats. See the complete results below.
Government before	Government after
Council of People's Deputies; SPD	Hirsch cabinet SPD–Z–DDP

State elections were held in the Free State of Prussia on 26 January 1919. The elections were held a week after the elections to the federal National Assembly, and were the first elections of Prussian institutions held using proportional representation and with women's suffrage. The election was also the first truly free and fair Prussian election, as it was the first election held after the abolition of the Prussian three-class franchise, which grouped voters by the amount of taxes paid and gave disproportionate weight to the wealthy.

The State Assembly (Landesversammlung) functioned as both a constituent assembly and legislature. The parties of the Weimar Coalition, the Social Democratic Party (SPD), Centre Party, and German Democratic Party (DDP), won a sweeping majority. Together they won 74.8% of the votes cast. SPD politician Paul Hirsch, who had been appointed Minister-President of Prussia in November 1918, continued in office, and was succeeded by Otto Braun in early 1920.

== Results ==
Party	Votes	%	Seats
Social Democratic Party (SPD)	6,278,291	36.38	145
Centre Party/Christian People's Party (Note: The Centre Party used the name "Christian People's Party" in this election.)	3,834,953	22.22	93
German Democratic Party (DDP)	2,796,359 (Note: Including 111,663 votes in constituency #21 (Koblenz/Trier) for the list "German Democratic Party and German People's Party".)	16.20	65
German National People's Party (DNVP)	1,936,939 (Note: Including 131,950 votes in constituency #22 (Düsseldorf 1–5) for the list "German National People's Party, German People's Party and National Association Essen".)	11.22	48
Independent Social Democratic Party (USPD)	1,280,803	7.42	24
German People's Party (DVP)	981,665 (Note: Including 164,687 votes in constituency #18 (Arnsberg) for the list "German People's Party and German National People's Party".)	5.69	23
German-Hanoverian Party (DHP)	84,975	0.49	2
Schleswig-Holstein Farmers and Farmworkers Democracy (SHBLD)	61,565	0.36	1
Christian Social Party	1.211	0.01	0
Protestant People's Party	552	0.00	0
Social Reform Party	31	0.00	0
Invalid/blank votes	(Note: Data is incomplete for Pomerania, Posen, the district of Merseburg and Schmalkalden, and Schleswig-Holstein. Accurate totals therefore cannot be given for registered voters, voter turnout, and valid/invalid votes.)	0.37	–
Total	17,257,344	100	401
Registered voters/turnout		74.79	–
Gonschior.de

Popular Vote
SPD	36.38%
Centre	22.22%
DDP	16.20%
DNVP	11.22%
USPD	7.42%
DVP	5.69%
DHP	0.49%
SHBLD	0.36%
Other	0.02%

State Assembly seats
SPD	36.16%
Centre	23.19%
DDP	16.21%
DNVP	11.97%
USPD	5.99%
DVP	5.74%
DHP	0.50%
SHBLD	0.25%

=== Results by constituency ===
Constituency	SPD	Z	DDP	DNVP	USPD	DVP	DHP	SHBLD
1. East Prussia	45.6	11.4	17.1	14.4	3.6	7.8	–	–
2. West Prussia	28.4	15.2	26.4	25.5	4.5	–	–	–
3. Berlin	35.1	5.5	15.3	10.4	28.2	5.5	–	–
4. Potsdam I	41.4	2.4	20.1	13.9	14.6	7.7	–	–
5. Potsdam II	35.2	4.0	20.4	15.0	15.0	10.4	–	–
6. Frankfurt-Oder	51.8	1.7	21.6	20.8	0.7	3.3	–	–
7. Pomerania	41.9	0.6	19.3	26.6	1.4	10.2	–	–
8. Posen	15.9	9.7	19.3	39.5	–	15.7	–	–
9. Breslau	47.0	22.2	14.6	16.1	0.1	–	–	–
10. Oppeln	29.7	49.3	5.5	7.4	–	8.2	–	–
11. Liegnitz	50.4	9.7	25.7	14.1	–	–	–	–
12. Magdeburg	57.9	1.7	23.8	9.9	3.3	3.3	–	–
13. Merseburg-Erfurt	16.3	5.9	23.4	13.6	39.5	1.4	–	–
14. Schleswig-Holstein	46.2	1.0	26.7	7.7	2.8	7.1	–	8.5
15. Aurich-Stade-Osnabrück	31.5	18.2	18.9	4.3	–	9.7	17.5	–
16. Hannover-Hildesheim-Lüneburg	46.8	(Note: The Centre Party ran a joint list with the DHP in constituency #16 (Hannover-Hildesheim-Lüneburg). Five DHP members and two Centre members were elected on this list.)	9.4	2.6	1.2	8.6	31.5	–
17. Münster-Minden-Kreis Schaumburg	28.0	48.0	7.7	8.1	1.8	6.2	–	–
18. Arnsberg	40.9	29.9	9.3	(Note: The DNVP ran on a joint list with the DVP in constituency #18 (Arnsberg). Four DVP members and no DNVP members were elected on this list.)	4.6	15.2	–	–
19. Hesse-Nassau	40.2	18.9	21.6	9.6	3.5	6.2	–	–
20. Cologne/Aachen	25.0	61.3	7.4	2.9	3.4	0.0	–	–
21. Koblenz/Trier	21.3	60.6	14.9	3.2	–	(Note: The DVP ran on a joint list with the DDP in constituency #21 (Koblenz/Trier). Two DDP members and no DVP members were elected on this list.)	–	–
22. Düsseldorf 1–5	27.2	28.9	11.2	15.4	17.3	(Note: The DVP ran on a joint list with the DNVP in constituency #22 (Düsseldorf 1–5). Three DNVP members and no DVP members were elected on this list.)	–	–
23. Düsseldorf 6–12	27.0	51.5	6.8	6.1	–	8.6	–	–
24. Sigmaringen (Note: The Centre Party was the only party that fielded a list in constituency #24 (Sigmaringen).)	–	99.8	–	–	–	–	–	–

Note: shaded boxes indicate the party that won the most votes in the constituency.

== See also ==
- Elections in the Free State of Prussia
- Weimar Republic
