= Heinrich Scheuch =

German general (1864–1946)

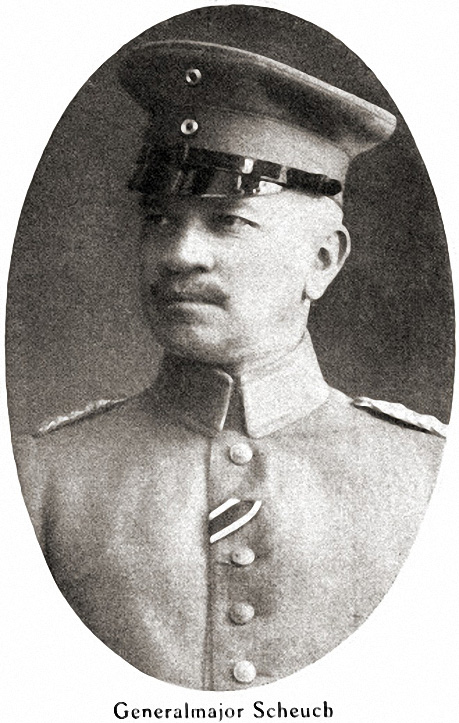

Heinrich Schëuch (sometimes Scheüch; 21 June 1864, Sélestat – 3 September 1946, Bad Kissingen) was a German officer of the Prussian Army, Generalleutnant of the German Army and (from 1918 to 1919) Prussian Minister of War.

== General der Infanterie ==
On 27 August 1939, Tannenbergtag, the highly decorated Knight of the Order of Pour le Mérite received the "Charakter" (honorary title) as a General der Infanterie of the Wehrmacht.

== Family ==
His father (1820–1888) worked as a jurist in Colmar. His mother Emilie Graeff was born in 1831 in Sélestat and died in 1879 in Herrlisheim-près-Colmar.

== Promotions ==
- 15 April 1882: Charakter als Fähnrich (Officer Cadet)
- 6 November 1882: Portepee-Fähnrich (with Patent)
- 17 October 1893: Leutnant
- 28 July 1892: Oberleutnant
- 27 January 1897: Hauptmann
- 18 August 1903: Major
- 20 April 1910: Oberstleutnant
- 22 March 1913: Oberst
- 27 January 1916: Generalmajor
- 9 October 1918: Generalleutnant
- 27 August 1939: Charakter als General der Infanterie
