= Bill Drews =

German lawyer and administrator (1870–1938)

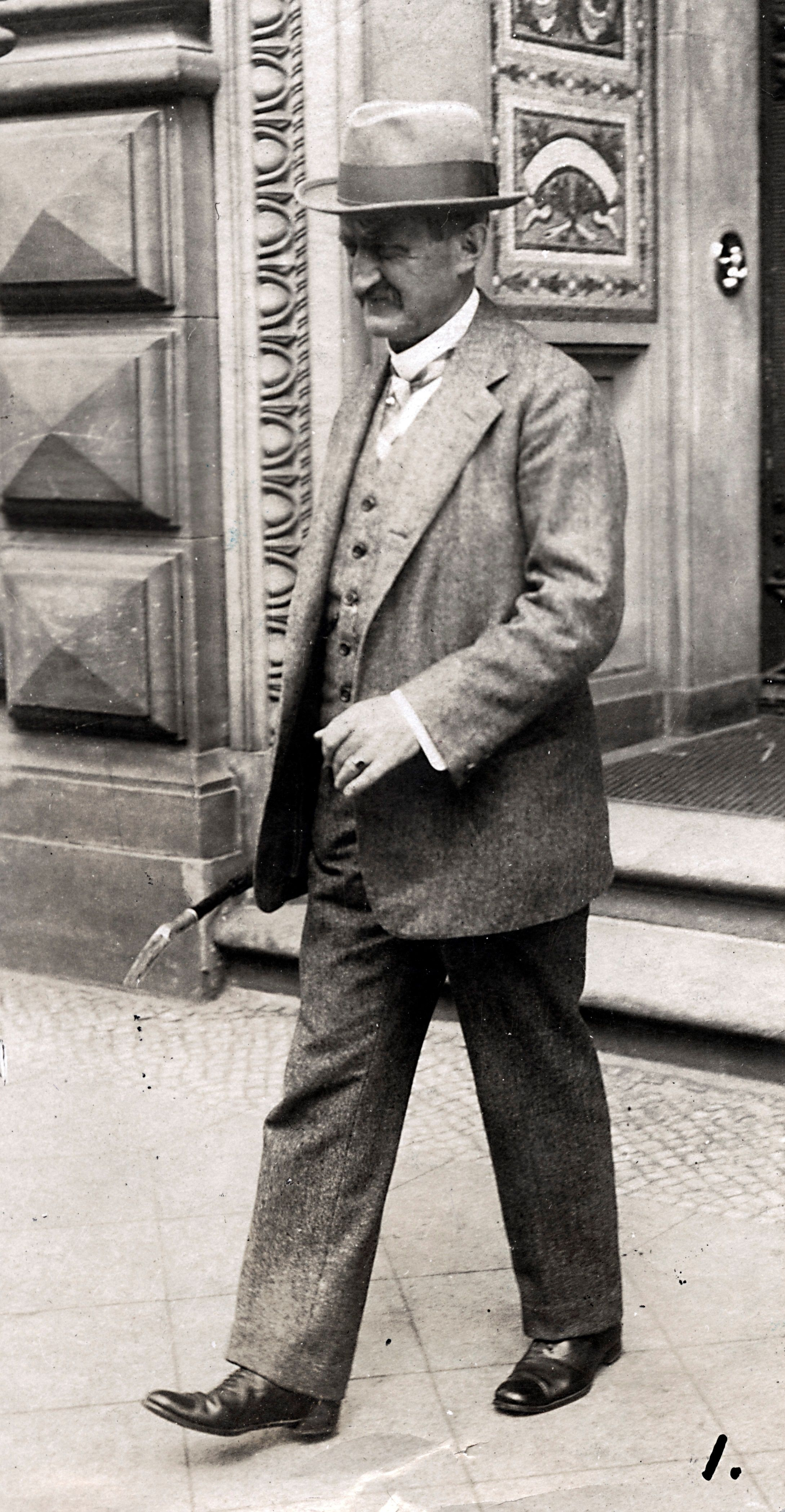
Bill Drews

Wilhelm Arnold Drews, known as Bill Drews (11 February 1870 – 17 February 1938), was a German lawyer and administrator. Bill Drews was the creator of the Prussian 1931 police administrative law, which became the model for all German police regulations.

== Early life ==
Drews studied law at Göttingen where he was a member of the Corps Bremensia fraternity. From 1902 to 1905 he was commissioner of the county of Oschersleben before joining the Kingdom of Prussia's Ministry of Interior.

He was Prussian Minister of the Interior from 1917 to 1918. In 1919, he was responsible for the overhaul of public administration in the then-new Free State of Prussia, and urged the creation of a rigidly organized state police force to supplement uncoordinated local police forces.

== Later life ==
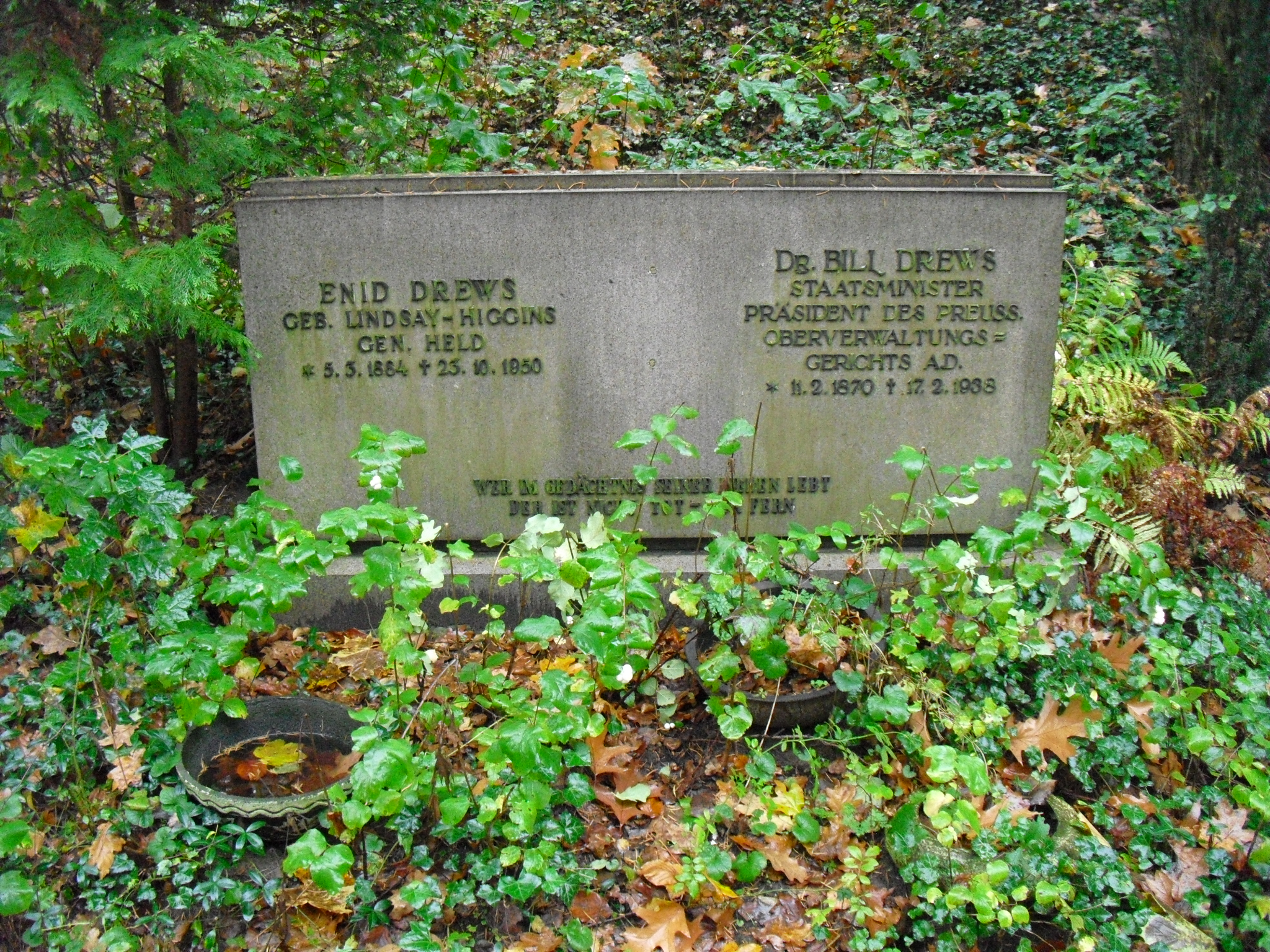
Grave in Friedhof Heerstraße, Berlin-Westend

Drews became president of the Prussian Superior Administrative Court in 1921. In 1927 he published Preußisches Polizeirecht, a textbook on police administration. Under his presidency, the court generally upheld the principle of the Rule of Law after the takeover of German government by the Nazi party, though it also allowed a substantial extension of police rights. Until his death in 1938, Drews was the repeated target of attacks by Nazi lawyers promoting the introduction of the Führer principle into public administration.

== Bibliography ==
- Grundzüge der Verwaltungsreform (Berlin: Carl Heymanns Verlag, 1919)
- Preußisches Polizeirecht (1927)
