= Heinrich Ströbel =

German journalist and politician (1869–1944)

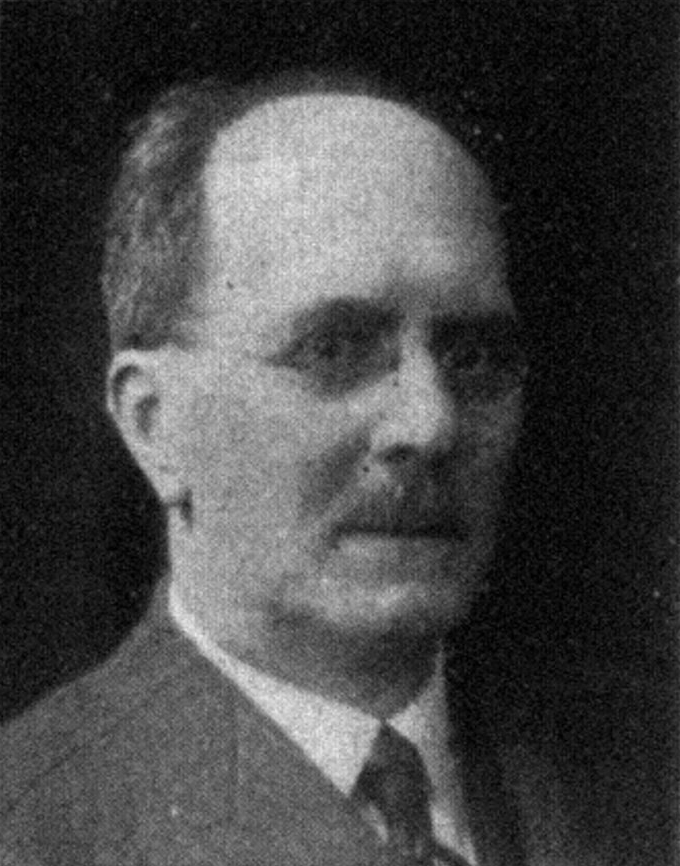
Ströbel's official Reichstag portrait, 1930

Heinrich Ströbel (7 June 1869 – 1 September 1944) was a socialist German journalist, poet, publicist, SPD and later USPD politician who was the editor in chief of the newspaper Vorwärts from 1905 to 1907.

== Biography ==
Ströbel came from a middle-class background. He completed secondary school and then began commercial training, which he broke off after a short time. He then continued to educate himself in the history of literature and economics as well as other subjects typical of the time. In 1889, while the Anti-Socialist Law was still in force, he joined the Social Democratic Party (SPD) and began to write for various party newspapers (including Die Neue Zeit and Vorwärts). In the years that followed, Ströbel concentrated on making a career within the SPD and becoming a party leader, which he largely succeeded in doing.

As early as 1900, on Rosa Luxemburg's initiative, Ströbel became editor of the central organ of the SPD and was a member of the Prussian House of Representatives from 1908 to 1918. In 1914, Ströbel was promoted to editor-in-chief of the Vorwärts and from the outset took a critical stance on the SPD leadership's truce policy during the First World War. In 1917 he therefore switched to the Independent Social Democratic Party, after having worked on the first issue of the magazine Die Internationale in 1915. Previously he had contact with the German Peace Society (DFG) and wanted and joined the pacifist collection movement Bund Neues Vaterland. As early as 1916, Ströbel lost his job in the course of the so-called “Vorfahr-Robb” and from then on called for a boycott of the central organ of the SPD.

After the end of the First World War, Ströbel took over the presidency of the Prussian revolutionary government together with the SPD member Paul Hirsch. From November 14, 1918 to January 4, 1919 he held the office of Minister President of Prussia.

From March 1919 to November 1920, Ströbel acted as political editorialist for the magazine Die Weltbühne. After the split in the USPD, he returned to the SPD in 1920 and was a member of the Reichstag for the party from 1924 to 1932. Here he belonged to the left, pacifist wing of the party. Shortly after being elected to the party executive at the Leipzig Party Congress in 1931, he joined the Socialist Workers' Party of Germany and briefly co-chaired it with Kurt Rosenfeld and Max Seydewitz, but returned to the SPD in early 1932. He was also a contributor to the pacifist newspaper Das Andere Deutschland.

In 1933 he emigrated to Switzerland, where he died in 1944.
