= Paul Hirsch (politician) =

German politician

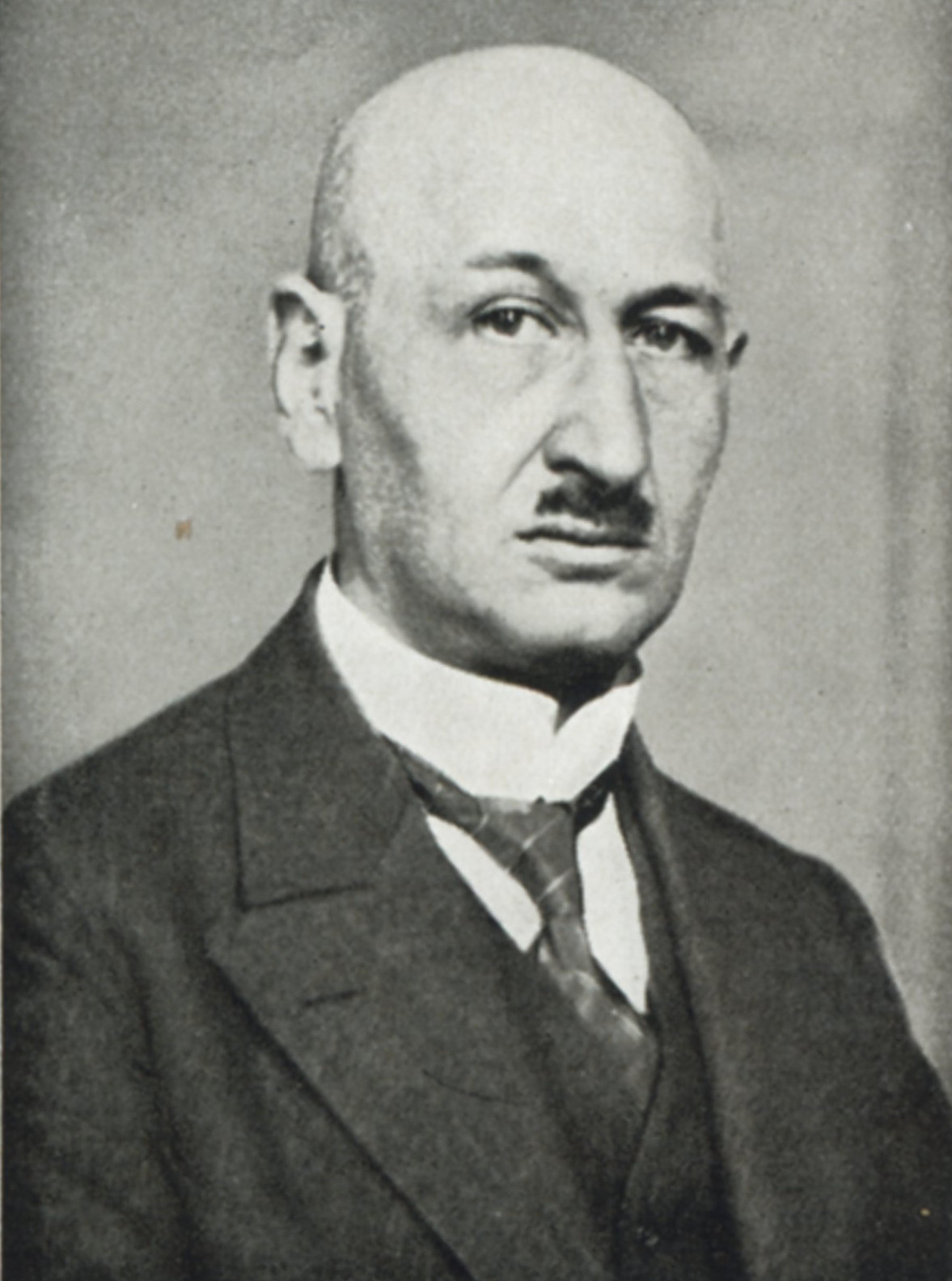
Hirsch c. 1931

Paul Hirsch (17 November 1868 – 1 August 1940) was a German politician and a member of the Social Democratic Party who served as Prime Minister of Prussia from 1918 to 1920.

== Life ==
Hirsch was born in Prenzlau, Brandenburg. He attended the Evangelisches Gymnasium zum Grauen Kloster in Berlin and went on to study medicine, social sciences and economics at the Frederick William University. From 1892 he worked as a professional writer and journalist. He joined the Social Democratic Party and in 1899 was elected municipal councillor in the then independent town of Charlottenburg. From 1908 he was one of the first Social Democratic members of the Prussian House of Representatives and served as head of the SPD parliamentary group.

During the German Revolution of 1918–19, Hirsch together with the USPD politician Heinrich Ströbel became chairman of the provisional government of the Free State of Prussia (Rat der Volksbeauftragten) and also served as Interior Minister. On 4 January 1919 he dismissed the USPD chief of police Emil Eichhorn, which sparked the Spartacist uprising.

Hirsch supported the Greater Berlin Act of 1920. He resigned from his post after the Kapp Putsch, but remained a member of the Prussian Landtag until 1932. He served as a borough councillor in Charlottenburg and from 1925 as mayor in Dortmund. Forced to retire after the Nazi Machtergreifung in 1933, Hirsch moved back to Berlin where he died in poverty in 1940.

He was mentioned by name as one of the Jewish politicians who undermined the Weimar Republic in the 1940 Nazi propaganda film Der Ewige Jude produced by Fritz Hippler.

Preceded by Max of Baden	Prime Minister of Prussia; 1918–1920 jointly with Heinrich Ströbel until January 1919	Succeeded by Otto Braun
