= Rudolf Wissell =

German politician (1869–1962)

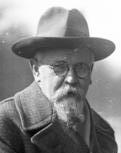
- Wissell in 1930

Reich Minister of Labour
- In office 1928–1930
- Chancellor: Hermann Müller

Reich Minister of Economic Affairs
- In office February 1919 – July 1919
- Chancellor: Philipp Scheidemann; Gustav Bauer

Member of the Reichstag (Weimar Republic)
- In office 1920–1933

(German Empire)
- In office 1918

Member of the Weimar National Assembly
- In office 1919

Personal details
- Born: Rudolf Wissell; 8 March 1869 Göttingen, Province of Hanover, Kingdom of Prussia
- Died: 13 December 1962 (aged 93) West Berlin, West Germany
- Party: Social Democratic Party of Germany
- Occupation: Politician

Rudolf Wissell (8 March 1869 – 13 December 1962) was a German politician in the Social Democratic Party of Germany (SPD). During the Weimar Republic, he held office as the Minister for Economic Affairs and Minister for Labour.

== Early life ==
Rudolf Wissell was born on 8 March 1869 in Göttingen, in the Prussian Province of Hanover. His father was Ludwig Wissel, a helmsman, his mother was Ulrike, née Klimmet. He went to school in Bremen from 1876-83. In 1883, he started an apprenticeship as a mechanical engineer. Finishing in 1887, Wissell started to work at a machine builder in Bremen.

In 1888, Wissel became a member of the (still illegal) SPD and chairman of the Fachverein der Schlosser und Maschinenbauer (a union). In 1890, he brought the Fachverein into the newly founded Deutscher Metallarbeiter-Verband. From 1891-3, he served in a Prussian Grenadier regiment stationed in Posen. Following military service, Wissell worked as a lathe operator at Kiel and for the Metallarbeiter-Verband from 1893-1901. He also attended courses in law. In 1901, Wissell became a full-time union functionary as Arbeitersekretär of the unions at Lübeck.

== Political career ==
Involving himself in social policy, he was a member of the Bürgerschaft, Lübeck's city parliament, from 1905-8. In 1908, he joined the Generalkommission der Gewerkschaften (the central workers' secretariat of trade unions) in Berlin, later becoming head of its social policy department.

In 1916-8, Wissell worked part-time in the SPD newspaper Vorwärts, as editor for social policy issues.

In March 1918, Wissel was elected to the Reichstag for the electoral district Niederbarnim/"Potsdam 6"; where he belonged to the party's right wing. In the German Revolution, Wissell became Zweiter Vorsitzender (deputy chairman) of the Generalkommission where he opposed the formation of a government based on workers' and soldiers' councils and argued for an agreement with employers. He supported the foundation of the Allgemeiner Deutscher Gewerkschaftsbund (ADG).

One result of his arguments was the conclusion of the Stinnes-Legien Agreement, which meant that the employer's associations for the first time recognised the trade unions as the representatives of the workers.

On 28 December 1918, the three representatives of the Independent Social Democratic Party of Germany (USPD) withdrew from the Council of the People's Deputies, the de facto government of Germany, and Wissell along with Gustav Noske became members.

== Weimar Republic ==
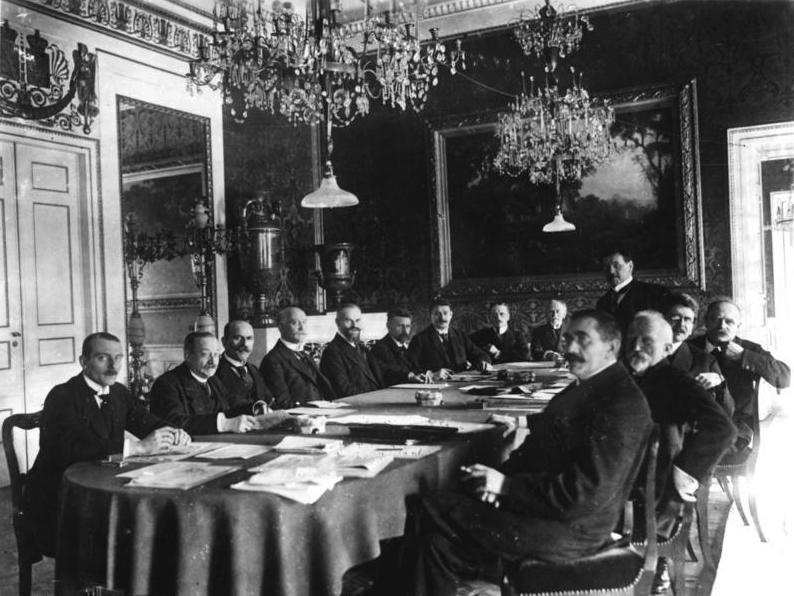
First cabinet meeting of the Scheidemann cabinet on 13 February 1919 in Weimar. Left to right: Ulrich Rauscher, government chief press officer, Robert Schmidt, Food, Eugen Schiffer, Finance, Philipp Scheidemann, Ministerpräsident, Otto Landsberg, Justice, Rudolf Wissell, Economic Affairs, Gustav Bauer, Labour, Ulrich von Brockdorff-Rantzau, Foreign, Eduard David without Portfolio, Hugo Preuß, Interior, Johannes Giesberts, Post, Johannes Bell, Colonies, Georg Gothein, Treasury, Gustav Noske, Reichswehr

In January 1919, Wissel was elected for the SPD to the National Assembly. One and a half years later, in June 1920, he was elected to the first Reichstag of the Weimar Republic. He was re-elected seven times from 1924 to 1933, and was a member of the German parliament for almost exactly 13 years, from June 1920 to June 1933.

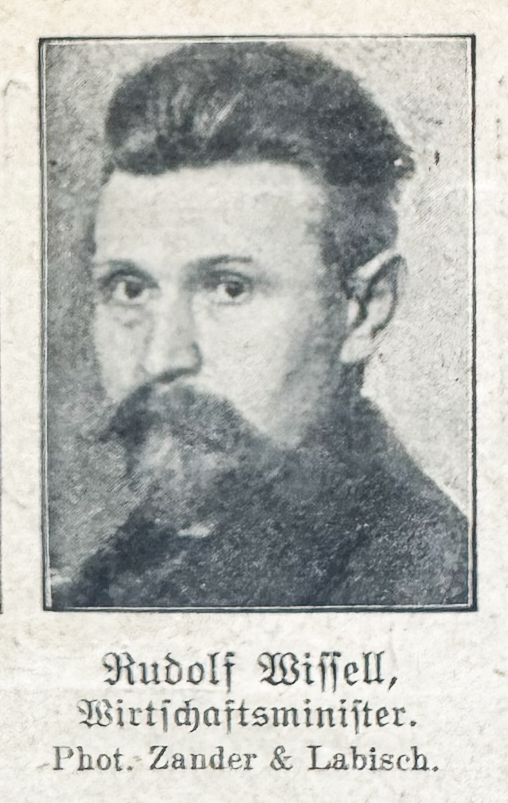
Rudolf Wissell, 1919 Minister of Labour in the Weimar Republic

Apart from his work as a member of the Reichstag, Wissell filled various high public offices in the 1920s. From February to July 1919, he was the first Reichswirtschaftsminister (Minister for Economic Affairs) of the republic. In this function in the cabinets of Philipp Scheidemann and Gustav Bauer, he opposed the left-wing councils and worked towards a socially controlled economy for the benefit of the community. When he was unable to convince his party and the government of the merits of this plan, he resigned.

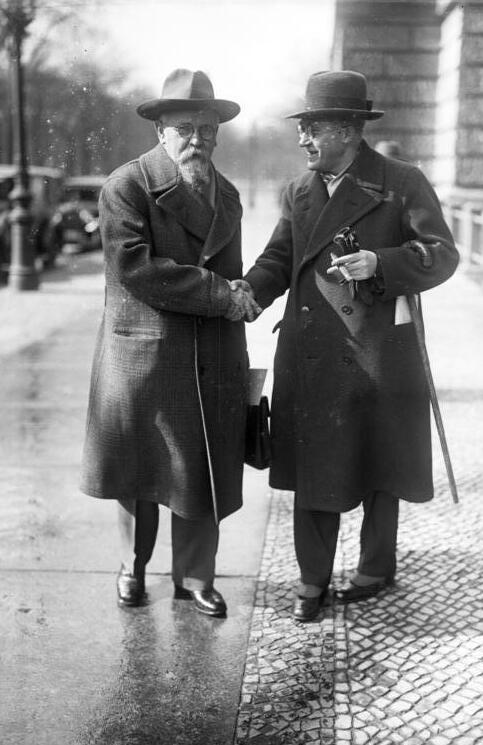
Rudolf Wissell, 1930 (left)

From 1928 to 1930, as Minister of Labour he belonged to the Kabinett der Persönlichkeiten (Cabinet of Personalities) under Hermann Müller. In this position, he opposed all strikes to help overcome the Great Depression.

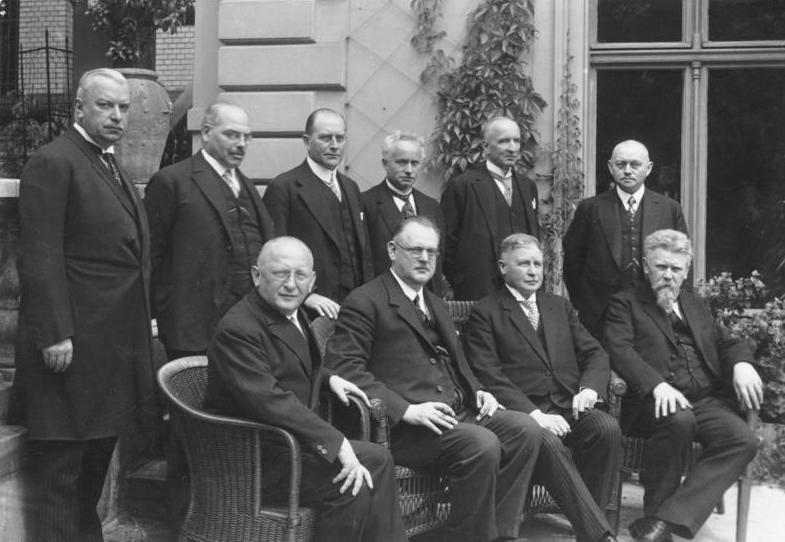
Rudolf Wissell (seated, far right) with the Müller cabinet, June 1928

As a politician engaged in social policy, Wissell was a member of the executive committee of the ADG from 1919 to 1924. From 1924 to 1932, he was also an arbitrator in pay negotiations in Berlin and Brandenburg. In 1929, he received an honorary doctorate from the University of Kiel due to his public service.

== Nazi Germany ==
The important parliamentary activities that Wissell participated in during his time in the Reichstag included the vote on the Enabling Act in March 1933: here, he was one of 94 members who voted against the law that created the legal foundations for the Nazi dictatorship. It was passed by 444 votes to 94.

After the Nazis' rise to power in early 1933, Wissell was expelled from public life, being a prominent Social Democrat. His Reichstag membership was revoked in June 1933. He was also placed under arrest for two months and was under police supervision for another two years. Retired, he then lived a withdrawn life in Berlin until 1945.

After 1945, Wissell worked on rebuilding the SPD in Berlin. He clearly rejected a unification of the SPD and the Communist Party of Germany (KPD). In the last years of his life, he received many different honours: in 1949 he became an honorary citizen of Berlin and in 1954 received the Großes Bundesverdienstkreuz (Great Cross of Merit).

== Death and remembrance ==
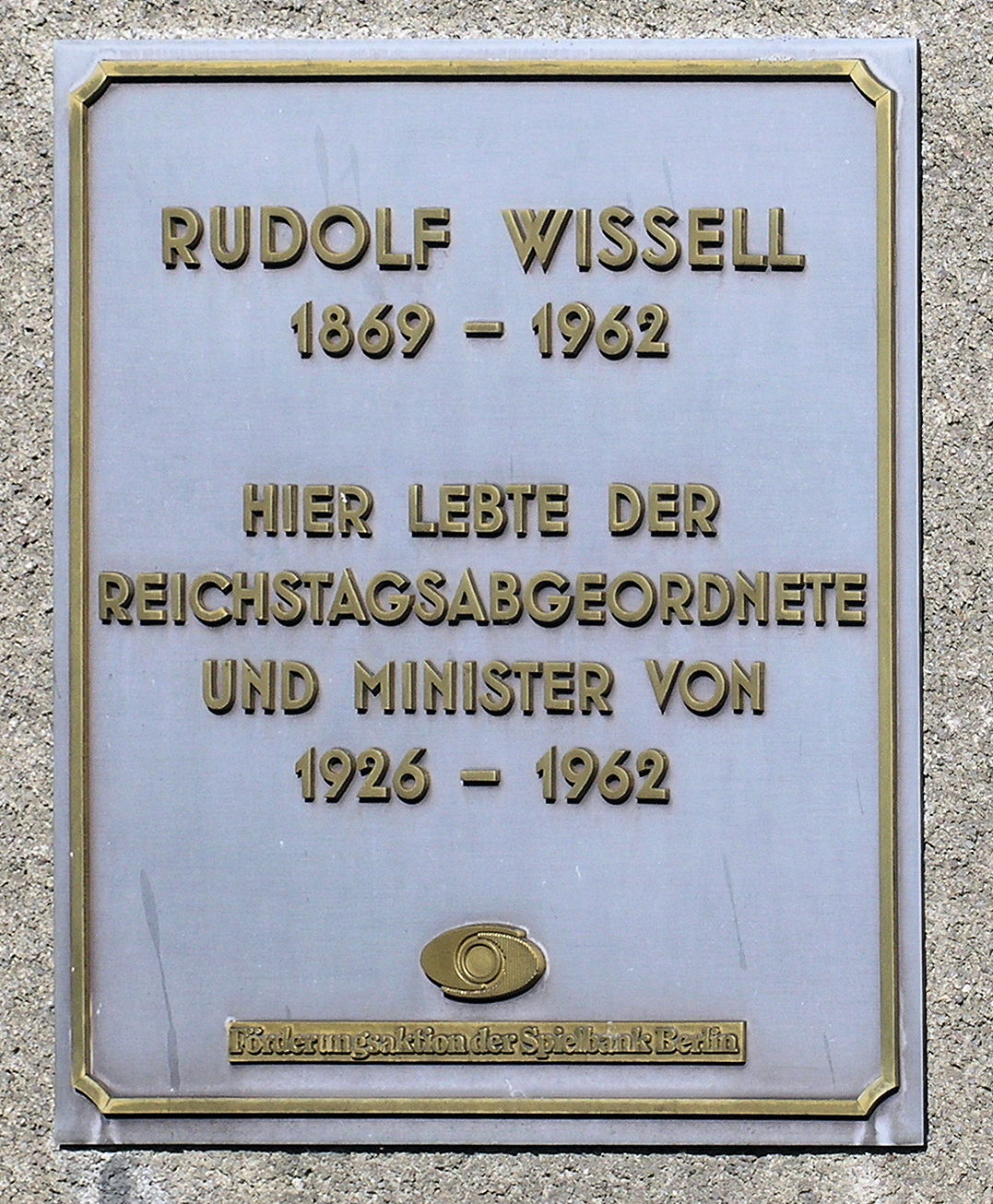
Commemorative plaque at Wiesenerstraße 22, in Berlin-Tempelhof

Wissell died in West Berlin on 13 December 1962. He was buried in a grave of honour of the Berlin Senate at the Holy Cross Cemetery, Berlin-Mariendorf.

Today, his name is carried by the Rudolf-Wissell-Brücke between Charlottenburg und Charlottenburg-Nord, at 960 meters the longest road bridge of Berlin, as well as the Rudolf-Wissell-Siedlung (Rudolf Wissell Settlement) in Staaken, built in the 1970s, and the Rudolf-Wissell-Grundschule (Rudolf Wissell Primary School) in Gesundbrunnen.
