= Joseph Koeth =

Reichsminister für wirtschaftliche Demobilmachung (Minister for Economic Demobilisation)
- In office 13 February 1919 – 30 April 1919
- Chancellor: Philipp Scheidemann (Ministerpräsident)
- Preceded by: post created
- Succeeded by: post abolished

Reichswirtschaftsminister (Minister for Economic Affairs)
- In office 6 October 1923 – 23 November 1923
- Chancellor: Gustav Stresemann
- Preceded by: Hans von Raumer
- Succeeded by: Eduard Hamm

Personal details
- Born: 7 July 1870 Lohr a. Main, Bavaria, Germany
- Died: 22 May 1936 (aged 65) Berlin
- Party: Independent
- Profession: Military officer, politician

Joseph Koeth (7 July 1870 – 22 May 1936) was a German military officer and politician. During World War I he served as head of the Kriegsrohstoffabteilung (War Raw Materials Department – KRA) of the Prussian Ministry of War created by Walther Rathenau. After the German revolution of 1918, Koeth was in charge of economic demobilisation as a member of the first democratically elected government under Philipp Scheidemann. He again served briefly as a minister of the Weimar Republic under Gustav Stresemann in 1923.

== Early life ==
Joseph Koeth was born on 7 July 1870 in Lohr a. Main, Lower Franconia, then a part of the Kingdom of Bavaria. His father, Joseph (1829–1913) was a lawyer. His mother, Susanne (1845–1903), came from a farming family.

He was married to Helene (1874–1958), née Fenkohl from Eastern Prussia (a sister of Gustav Fenkohl, a painter). They had one son, who was killed in war.

== Military career ==
After serving for eleven years in the Bavarian Army, Koeth joined the Prussian Army in January 1900 as a Premier-Lieutenant. He had attended the War Academy at Munich for three years (1895–98) but was not awarded the full qualification to join the general staff, despite excellent performance.

He then served for nine years as a chief of battery in the 4th Badische Feldartillerie-Regiment Nummer 66 and in the training regiment Feldartillerie-Schießschule at Jüterbog (after 1904). After August 1909, Koeth worked at the Prussian Ministry of War (Feldartillerie-Abteilung, A 4). In March 1912, he was promoted to Major.

After the start of World War I, Koeth briefly served as Abteilungskommandeur (Battle of the Marne, static battles in the Champagne). However, in early October 1914 he returned to department A4 in the Ministry. In late February 1915, after working as an acting head of department, he succeeded Walther Rathenau as head of the Kriegsrohstoff-Abteilung (KRA, commodity department), without having had any prior experience in this field. His task was to provide war production with the required raw materials. He succeeded in this work through a system of Planned economy, systematic recycling of used materials and by accessing new sources of commodities. The work of his office (employing around 2,500 people at the end of the war) was highly regarded and brought him the recognition of the military command, industrialists and trade unions. However, in 1916/17 there were sharp differences with general Wilhelm Groener, head of the Kriegsamt, in connection with the Hindenburg Programme and the Auxiliary Services Act (1916). The cooperation with Groener's successor, Heinrich Scheuch, went more smoothly. In March 1917, Koeth was promoted to Oberstleutnant and Abteilungschef (head of department).

== Demobilisation and political career ==
On 11 November 1918, Koeth left active service with the rank of Oberst (colonel). Both industrialist and trade union organisations had already lobbied chancellor Max von Baden to put him in charge of demobilisation. Under the Council of the People's Deputies, Koeth became Staatssekretär (de facto minister) of the Reichsamt für wirtschaftliche Demobilmachung (office for economic demobilisation), a position created for him. When the cabinet of Philipp Scheidemann took office in February 1919, he became Reichsminister für wirtschaftliche Demobilmachung (Minister for Economic Demobilisation) until the Ministry was dissolved on 30 April 1919.

His difficult task was to move the German war economy to a peace footing against a backdrop of revolutionary conditions and with responsibilities and power structures still in flux. The economic depression with rising unemployment and the devaluation of the currency caused by the post-war slump presented important obstacles on the way towards an industrial structure geared to the new requirements of peace-time Germany. Although Koeth extensively intervened in the economy, he opposed socialisation of the factors of production as demanded by the left wing of the revolution. There was considerable overlap between Koeth's portfolio and the Ministries of Finance, Economic Affairs and Labour, resulting in conflicts with Eugen Schiffer, Rudolf Wissell and Gustav Bauer.

Koeth also was the founding president of the German War Graves Commission in 1919 (until 1923).

In March 1920, he took on the honorary chairmanship of the Geschäftsstelle für industrielle Abrüstung (Geifa) of the Reichsverband der deutschen Industrie/Sonderausschuß für industrielle Abrüstung (organisation for industrial disarmament).

In October and November 1923, Koeth was Minister of Economic Affairs in the second cabinet of Gustav Stresemann. It was so short-lived, though, that he was unable to make a major contribution to policy - although during his period in office the Papiermark was replaced with the Rentenmark, which laid the foundation for the stabilisation of the currency and the end of hyperinflation.

== Further career ==
He was a member of the supervisory boards of several large and mid-sized companies and, until February 1930, chairman of the Deutsche Weltwirtschaftliche Gesellschaft. He also advised the Reichswehr at times. Koeth spent his final years in complete retirement. He died on 22 May 1936 in Berlin.

== Works ==
- "Rohstoffbewirtschaftung," in Handbuch der Politik II, 1920, pp. 224–35.
- "Die wirtschaftliche Demobilmachung, Ihre Aufgaben und ihre Organe,"in Handbuch der Politik IV, 1921, pp. 163–68.

== Honours ==
- Honorary doctorate (Dr.-Ing. h.c.), Technische Hochschule Dresden
