= Ulrich von Brockdorff-Rantzau =

German diplomat (1869–1928)

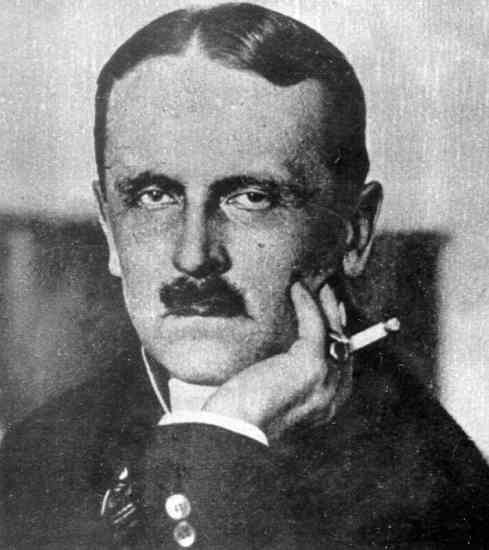

Foreign Minister of Germany
- In office 13 December 1918 – 20 June 1919
- President: Friedrich Ebert
- Chancellor: Philipp Scheidemann (Ministerpräsident)
- Preceded by: Wilhelm Solf (Imperial Germany); Council of the People's Deputies
- Succeeded by: Hermann Müller

German Ambassador to the Soviet Union
- In office November 1922 – 8 September 1928
- Preceded by: Kurt Wiedenfeld
- Succeeded by: Herbert von Dirksen

Personal details
- Born: 29 May 1869 Schleswig, Kingdom of Prussia
- Died: 8 September 1928 (aged 59) Berlin, Free State of Prussia, Weimar Republic
- Party: none
- Profession: Politician, diplomat

Ulrich Karl Christian Graf von Brockdorff-Rantzau (29 May 1869 – 8 September 1928) was a German diplomat who became the first Foreign Minister of the Weimar Republic. In that capacity, he led the German delegation at the Paris Peace Conference but resigned over the signing of the Treaty of Versailles. He was also the German ambassador to the Soviet Union from 1922 to 1928.

== Early life and career in the German Empire ==
Ulrich von Brockdorff-Rantzau was born in Schleswig on 29 May 1869. He was the son of Graf Hermann zu Rantzau (1840–72), a Prussian civil servant (Regierungsassessor) of the Rantzau family and his wife, Gräfin Juliane zu Rantzau, née von Brockdorff from Rastorf. Ulrich had a twin brother, Ernst Graf zu Rantzau (1869–1930) who later became a Geheimer Regierungsrat.

In 1891, a great-uncle left him the manor Annettenhöh near Schleswig, and he took the name "Brockdorff-Rantzau".

In 1888–91, he studied law at Neuchâtel, Freiburg im Breisgau, Berlin (Referendarsexamen in 1891) and Leipzig. He was awarded a Dr. jur. at Leipzig in 1891. Too young to join the Auswärtiges Amt (AA), the Imperial Foreign Office, he joined the Prussian Army as Fahnenjunker and was soon promoted to Leutnant in the 1. Garderegiment zu Fuß (stationed in Flensburg). After an injury he left military service in 1893 and became a diplomat in the Foreign Office: as an Attaché at the AA in 1894, 1894–96 at the German Gesandtschaft at Brussels, 1896–97 at the AA (trade policy department), 1897-1901 as Legationssekretär (secretary to the embassy) at St Petersburg, 1901–09 at Vienna, where he soon rose to Legationsrat and, after a short stay at The Hague, in 1905 to Botschaftsrat. From 1909 to 1912 he was political Generalkonsul at Budapest and in May 1912 became envoy to Copenhagen.

Brockdorff-Rantzau opposed the Prussian policies on Denmark and worked to improve the relationship between Denmark and Germany. During World War I, he supported Danish neutrality and worked to keep up the crucial trade links (German coal for Danish food) as the war dragged on.

He came in close contact with Danish and German trade unions and got to know the future German president Friedrich Ebert. He was also instrumental in facilitating the passage of the Bolsheviks Vladimir Lenin and Karl Radek across Germany in a sealed train in 1917.

He was offered the post of Staatssekretär des Auswärtigen (State Secretary for Foreign Affairs) following Arthur Zimmermann's resignation in 1917, but declined because he did not believe he could follow a policy independent from military interference.

== German Revolution and Treaty of Versailles ==
=== Appointment as head of „The Auswärtigen Amt“ ===
During the Revolution of 1918–1919, Friedrich Ebert and Philipp Scheidemann of the ruling Council of the People's Deputies asked him in early January 1919 to become Staatssekretär des Auswärtigen as the successor to Wilhelm Solf, the last person to hold the position under the Empire who had remained in place even as the council had taken over as the actual government of Germany.

He accepted the position to lead the Auswärtigen Amt dependent on five conditions:

1. A national constituent assembly should be convened before 16 February 1919 to ensure the Council of People's Deputies should have a constitutional basis.
2. Germany's credit rating should be restored to facilitate loans from the USA.
3. A republican Army should be immediately created to hold back the prospect of a communist revolution and to create a stronger negotiating position for Germany at the peace conference.
4. All possible steps should be made to remove the Workers' and Soldiers' Councils from involvement in governing the state.
5. He demanded the right to participate in the solution of domestic problems and to reject a dictated peace if he felt it threatened Germany's future.

The Council of the People's Deputies agreed to the first four conditions and he received the appointment, arriving in Berlin 2 January 1919.

In February, Brockdorff-Rantzau's title changed as he became the first Reichsminister des Auswärtigen at the AA in the cabinet of Scheidemann. Although by background and nature a member of the aristocracy, Brockdorff-Rantzau was a convinced democrat and wholly accepted the republic which had replaced the monarchy. He insisted on forceful domestic opposition against leftist revolutionaries, use of democratic principles in foreign policy, i.e. a right of self-determination also for the Germans, a Frieden des Rechts (lawful peace) based on the Fourteen Points of US President Wilson. This meant for him the unification of the Reich with Austria and participation in the League of Nations to secure world peace.

=== Paris Conference and Treaty of Versailles ===
Brockdorff-Rantzau led the German delegation that went to Versailles to receive the treaty agreed by the Paris Peace Conference between the Allies and the associated states.

In a speech to the Conference on 7 May 1919, he repudiated the claim that Germany and Austria were solely responsible for the war, although he accepted a partial guilt especially with regard to what has become known as the Rape of Belgium. He pointed out that both sides should be bound by Wilson's Fourteen Points.

Brockdorff-Rantzau led the effort by the German delegation to write up some counter proposals that were handed over to the Allies on 29 May (and caused consternation back in Berlin). He argued against what he thought to be a false dichotomy between "to sign" or "not to sign", and considered written negotiations (the Allies had refused to negotiate face to face) an alternative to make the onerous peace less unfair and dishonouring to Germany. After it became obvious that the Allies were not willing to make any changes (save in very minor matters) to the original Treaty draft and that Germany was likely to sign it nonetheless, he resigned his post on 20 June 1919 together with Scheidemann and Otto Landsberg, protesting the signature of what he thought of as a Diktat.

== Further career ==
Over the next years Brockdorff-Rantzau took an active interest in foreign policy issues and went public several times with arguments for a revision of the Treaty and the establishment of a more rational law of nations. On 15 July 1922, he penned a secret memo to Friedrich Ebert, warning of the dangers associated with the Treaty of Rapallo as this would cause the Western powers military concerns. He argued that a policy of playing off the great powers against each other, like Bismarck had done, was not possible any more. However, appointed as ambassador to the Soviet Union in November 1922, he favoured a rapprochement between the two countries without sacrificing German links to the west. His opposition to military cooperation with the Soviets led to confrontations with the head of the Reichswehr, Hans von Seeckt, as well as with Chancellor Joseph Wirth. He was very critical of the Locarno Treaties, which brought Germany closer to France and were resented by the Soviet leadership.

Brockdorff-Rantzau managed to win Soviet agreement to the Treaty of Berlin in April 1926 that established a relationship of neutrality and nonaggression between the two countries. He felt that this pact restored a balance between German links to east and west. Brockdorff-Rantzau was held in high esteem by the Soviet government and had a good personal relationship with Soviet foreign minister (People's Commissar of Foreign Affairs) Georgy Chicherin.

He remained in this post until his death on 8 September 1928 when he was on holiday at Berlin.

== Publications ==
- Patronat u. Compatronat. Dissertation. Leipzig 1890 bis 1891.
- Dokumente und Gedanken um Versailles. Berlin 1925.

== See also ==
- Soviet-German relations before 1941

Political offices
Preceded by Wilhelm Solf	Foreign Minister of Germany; 1918–1919	Succeeded by Hermann Müller
