= Ebert–Groener pact =

1918 cooperation agreement in Germany

The Ebert–Groener pact was an agreement between the Social Democrat Friedrich Ebert, at the time the Chancellor of Germany, and Wilhelm Groener, Quartermaster General of the German Army, on 10 November 1918. This occurred on the day after the German Revolution had brought Ebert to power.

Groener assured Ebert of the loyalty of the armed forces. In return, Ebert promised that the government would take prompt action against leftist uprisings, that he would call a national assembly, and most importantly that military command would remain with the professional officer corps.

The agreement gave the government the means to defeat the challenge posed to its authority by those on the political left. However, it also drove a wedge between Ebert's Social Democratic Party and other socialist groups, who accused him of allying himself with the enemy of the revolution. It kept the military, which had been the true power in the German Empire during World War I, as a largely self-governing institution that operated outside of civilian control. Future governments of the Weimar Republic would thus be dependent on the goodwill or lack thereof of its leadership.

== Background ==
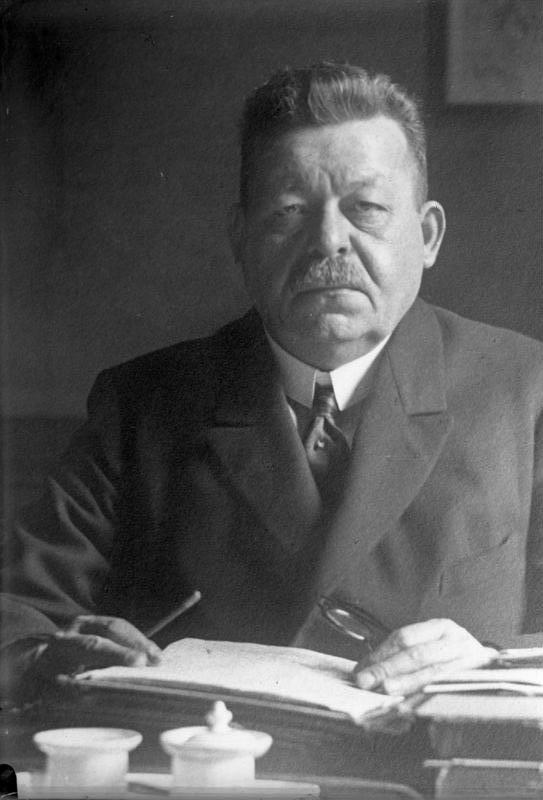
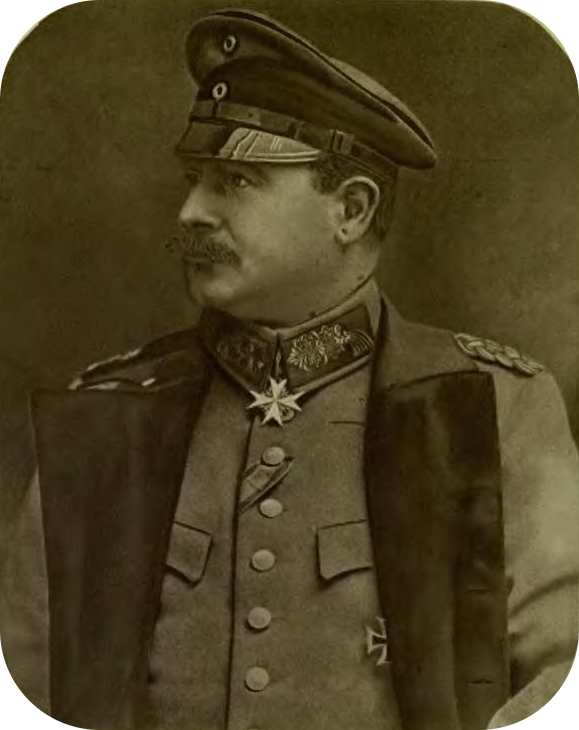
Friedrich Ebert in 1925 (left) and Wilhelm Groener in 1917 (right).

Historically, the German civil government and the Army supreme command had remained independent of one another with the military only responsible to the Kaiser, not the Chancellor. During the course of World War I, the military high command (OHL) and, in particular, Erich Ludendorff, the First Quartermaster General of the German Army, had become the de facto ruler of Germany. Although Paul von Hindenburg and Emperor Wilhelm II were both nominally Ludendorff's superiors, Ludendorff was taking the important decisions.

When it became clear that the war was lost in late summer/autumn of 1918, Ludendorff started to favour the "parliamentisation" of the Empire, a constitutional transfer of power to those parties that held the majority in the Reichstag: Social Democrats (SPD), Center Party and Progress Party. The goal was to shift the blame for the military defeat from the OHL to the politicians of the majority parties. On 29 September 1918 Ludendorff suddenly informed the civilian government that the Western Front could collapse at any moment and that a ceasefire had to be negotiated without delay. However, he suggested that the request for the ceasefire should come from a new government, based on the Reichstag majority. A "revolution from above" was needed. Chancellor Georg von Hertling and Emperor Wilhelm II agreed, but the former resigned. In early October, the Emperor appointed a liberal, Prince Maximilian of Baden, as chancellor to lead peace negotiations with the Allies. The request for a ceasefire went out on 4 October.

As US President Woodrow Wilson did not agree immediately to ceasefire negotiations, there was a delay of several weeks. Now, Ludendorff again changed tack and argued in favour of continued fighting and for the exchange of diplomatic notes to be ended. However, when he threatened to resign, a successful bluff several times before, this time, on 26 October, his resignation was accepted. Ludendorff's successor was Wilhelm Groener.

On 30 October a confrontation between officers and crews on board the German fleet at Kiel set in motion a train of events that would result in the German Revolution, which spread over a substantial part of the country over the next week. On 9 November, as the striking masses were marching on Berlin, Prince Max unilaterally and untruthfully declared that Emperor Wilhelm II had abdicated. He then resigned himself and unconstitutionally handed his office over to Ebert, who thus became Minister President of Prussia and Chancellor of Germany.

Ebert's first action as Chancellor was to issue a proclamation, asking the people to remain calm, get off the streets and to restore peace and order. It failed to work. Ebert found himself in a quandary. He had succeeded in bringing the SPD to power and was now in a position to put into law social reforms and improve the lot of the working class. However, as a result of the revolution, his party (and he himself) was forced to share power with those on the left that he despised, the Spartacists and the Independents of the USPD.

On the afternoon of 9 November he asked the USPD to nominate three ministers for the future government, but they were slow to respond. That evening, a group of several hundred followers of labour leaders from Berlin known as the Revolutionary Stewards occupied the Reichstag and held an impromptu debate. They called for the election of soldiers' and workers' councils the next day with an eye to naming a provisional government, the Council of the People's Deputies.

On 10 November the SPD, led by Ebert, managed to ensure that a majority of the newly elected workers' and soldiers' councils came from among their own supporters. Meanwhile, the USPD agreed to work with him to share power in the Rat der Volksbeauftragten. That afternoon, Ebert announced the cooperation between SPD and USPD to several thousand representatives of the councils assembled at Zirkus Busch. Eager for a unified socialist front, they approved the parity of three members of the new government each from SPD and USPD.

Ebert was one of those three SPD members and was thus at that stage both the head of government and a leader of the revolution. However, he remained concerned that the situation might get out of control and that the democratic system that he was trying to establish might be swept away by a more radical dictatorship, as had happened in Russia in October 1917.

With the outbreak of the revolt in early November, Groener had been busy trying to keep the Western Front intact until the ceasefire could be agreed on. He had also been involved in discussions with Wilhelm II about using the army against the revolutionaries at home and with Max von Baden and Ebert about the abdication of the Emperor.

Groener was mainly interested in preventing the more extreme demands of the revolutionary left regarding the military from being implemented: supreme command to be vested in the Rat der Volksbeauftragen, disciplinary power to be with the soldiers' councils, free election of officers, no rank insignia and no respect for rank off-duty.

== Making of pact ==
Late on the evening of 10 November Groener telephoned Ebert at the Reichskanzlei using a secret line, the existence of which had been unknown to Ebert until that time. Groener was at Spa, Belgium at the forward-deployed headquarters of the Oberste Heeresleitung. Ebert never talked about what was said, so the only information for posterity on what was discussed is from Groener. According to him, he offered Ebert the loyalty and cooperation of the armed forces in return for some demands: a fight against Bolshevism, a speedy end to the soldiers' councils and restoration of the sole authority of the officers corps, a national assembly and a return to law and order. Ebert seemed still unsettled from the stormy meeting he had just attended and at the end of the conversation, he thanked Groener.

Following the initial telephone call, Ebert and Groener talked each evening over a secret line between the Reichskanzlei in Berlin and the headquarters (first at Spa, then at Kassel) as Groener wrote in his memoirs "about the necessary measures".

== Consequences ==
As a direct result of the pact, which initially remained secret, the government was not threatened by anti-democratic forces on the right and in the military, at least for the time being. Instead, it was able to focus on the challenges to its authority from the revolutionary left. That led to several armed confrontations, the first of which occurred only a few weeks after the pact.

On 24 December, on Ebert's request, regular troops attacked the Reichsmarinedivision, a division that had rebelled over outstanding pay and the quality of their accommodation. In January 1919, during the so-called Spartakuswoche (Spartacist uprising), the masses again gathered in Berlin and the KPD and USPD under Karl Liebknecht and Georg Ledebour tried to topple the Ebert government. From 9 to 12 January, regular troops and Freikorps bloodily suppressed the uprising. On 15 January, members of the Freikorps "Garde-Kavallerie-Schützendivision" led by Waldemar Pabst, murdered Liebknecht and Rosa Luxemburg.

Since the 19 January elections to the National Assembly returned a solid majority for the democratic parties (SPD, Centre and DDP), Ebert felt that the revolutionary forces had no legitimacy left. In Bavaria, the Bavarian Soviet Republic was ended in May 1919. The individual workers' and soldiers' councils across Germany had dissolved by late in the autumn of 1919.

Since Groener saw no point in resuming the fight against the Allies, he advised the government in June 1919 to accept the Treaty of Versailles. Not much later he resigned from the army, as had his superior, Hindenburg on 29 June 1919. Groener is considered the most loyal of the military leaders of the Weimar Republic. His successor, Hans von Seeckt, who, from 1 October 1919, held the new position of chief of the Truppenamt (as the Treaty of Versailles did not allow Germany to have a general staff) was unwilling to follow every order given to him by the civilian government. During the right-wing Kapp Putsch, which involved numerous Freikorps members in 1920, the Reichswehr under von Seeckt refused to help the government.

Another consequence was that many former supporters of the SPD saw Ebert's cooperation with the military, which was essentially the same institution as under the Emperor, as a betrayal and turned to the USPD or KPD. That contributed to the eventual erosion of support for the Weimar Coalition and the resulting political polarisation between extremists on the left and right. Most importantly, the military's "state within the state" status and its refusal to accept the democratic Weimar Republic led the military under the leadership of General Kurt von Schleicher to undermine democracy in the early 1930s.
