= Scheidemann cabinet =

First government under the Weimar Republic

Cabinet of Philipp Scheidemann
- 1st Cabinet of Weimar Germany
- 13 February 1919 – 20 June 1919
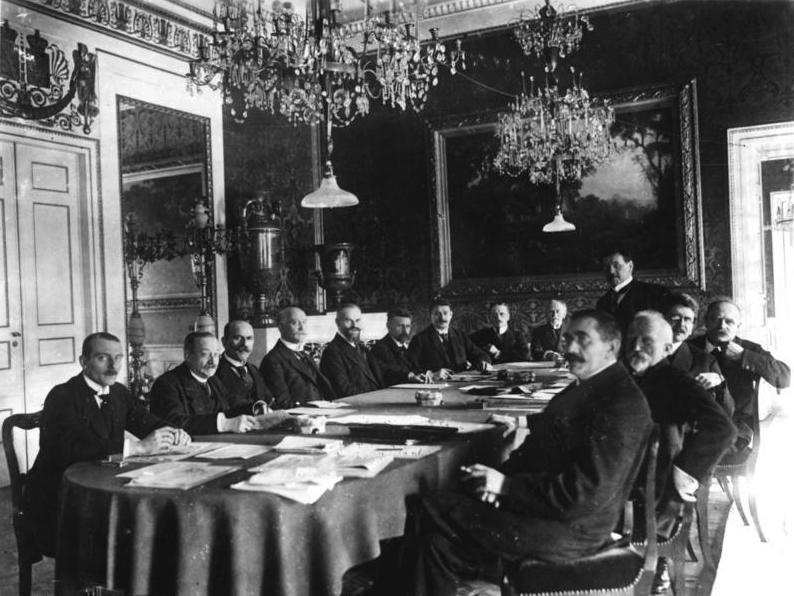
- First meeting of the cabinet
- Date formed: 13 February 1919
- Date dissolved: 20 June 1919 (4 months and 7 days)

People and organisations
- President: Friedrich Ebert
- Minister-President: Philipp Scheidemann
- Deputy Minister-President: Eugen Schiffer (until 19 April 1919); Bernhard Dernburg
- Member parties: Social Democratic Party; Centre Party; German Democratic Party
- Status in legislature: Weimar Coalition
- Opposition parties: German National People's Party; Independent Social Democratic Party; German People's Party

History
- Election: 1919 federal election
- Legislature term: Weimar National Assembly
- Predecessor: Council of the People's Deputies
- Successor: Bauer cabinet

The Scheidemann cabinet, headed by Minister President Philipp Scheidemann of the Social Democratic Party (SPD), was Germany's first democratically elected national government. It took office on 13 February 1919, three months after the collapse of the German Empire following Germany's defeat in World War I. Although the Weimar Constitution was not in force yet, it is generally counted as the first government of the Weimar Republic.

It was formed from members elected in January 1919 to the Weimar National Assembly, which was to act as Germany's interim parliament and adopt a constitution for the new republic. The cabinet was based on the Weimar Coalition of three centre-left parties: the SPD, the Centre Party and the German Democratic Party.

During its time in office, Scheidemann's cabinet had to deal with leftist uprisings, most notably in Berlin, the Ruhr and Bavaria, and with separatist movements in the occupied Rhineland and in eastern provinces of Prussia such as Posen and Silesia. By far its biggest challenge, however, was responding to the Armistice of 1918 and the Paris Peace Conference. The tension between the outrage at the terms of the Treaty of Versailles and the potential repercussions of rejecting the treaty led to the breakup of the cabinet. Scheidemann, who had called the treaty "intolerable", resigned in protest against it on 20 June 1919.

Gustav Bauer, also of the SPD, headed the Bauer cabinet that replaced Scheidemann's.

== Election and establishment ==
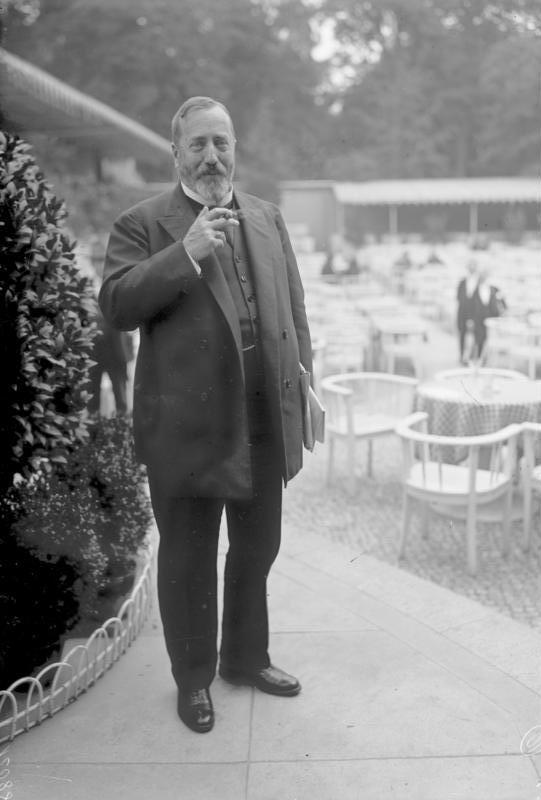
Bernhard Dernburg (DDP), Deputy Minister President

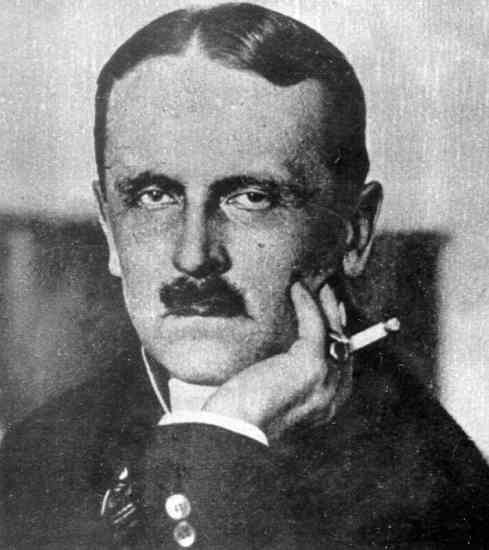
Ulrich von Brockdorff-Rantzau (Ind.), Minister of Foreign Affairs

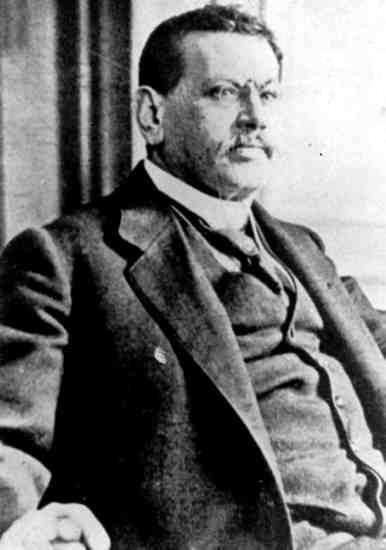
Hugo Preuß (DDP), Minister of the Interior

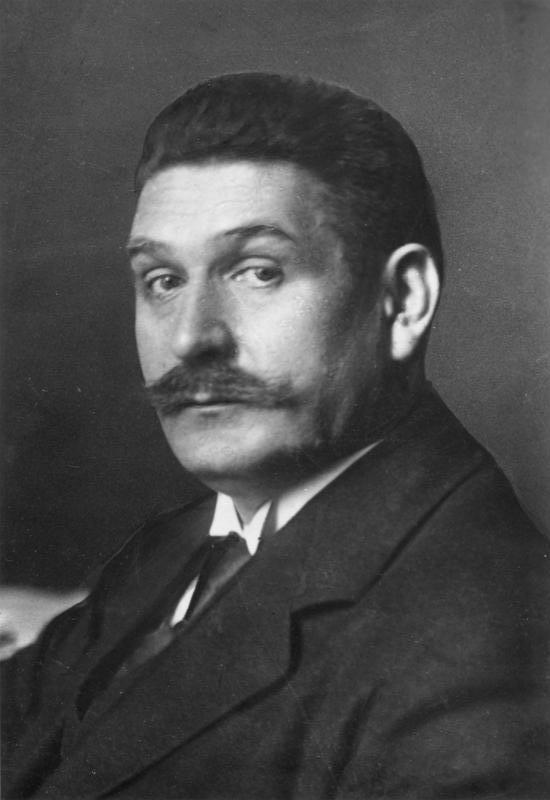
Gustav Bauer (SPD), Minister of Labour

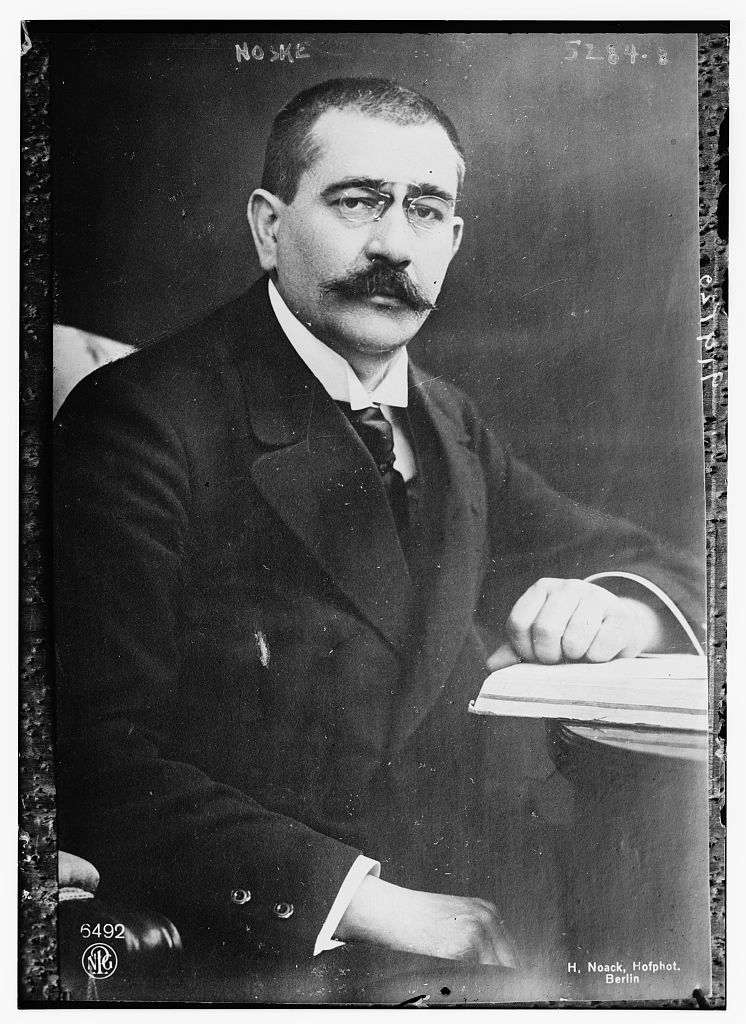
Gustav Noske (SPD), Reichswehr Minister

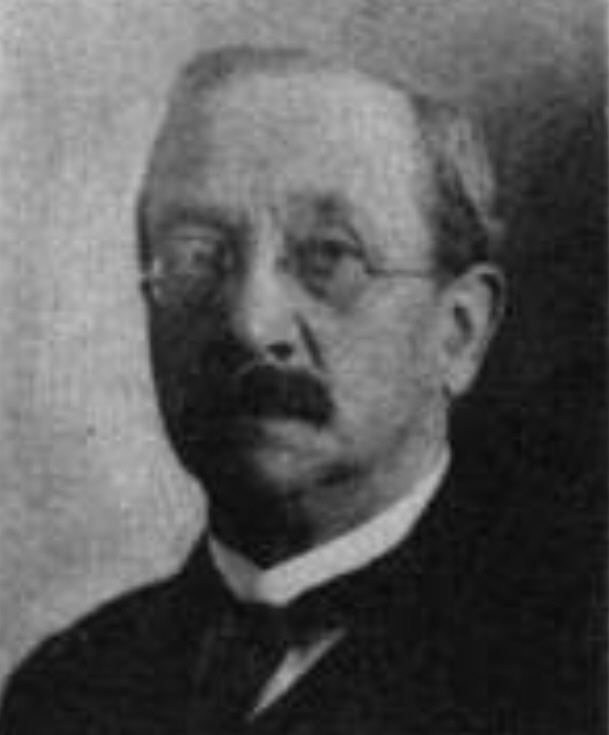
Robert Schmidt (SPD), Minister of Food and Agriculture

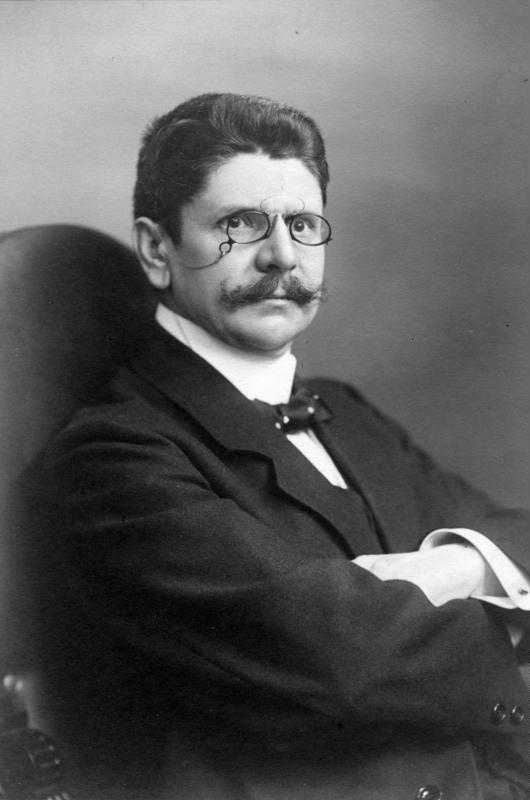
Johannes Bell (Centre), Colonial Minister

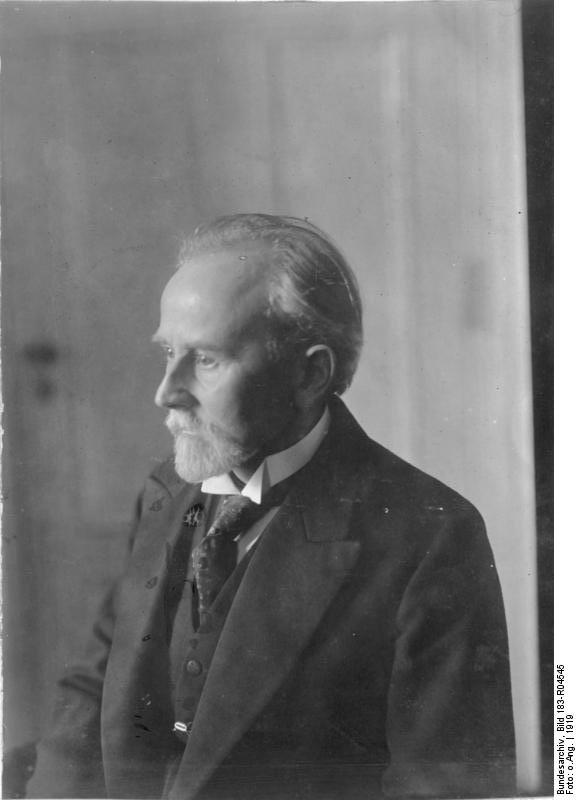
Eduard David (SPD), Minister without portfolio

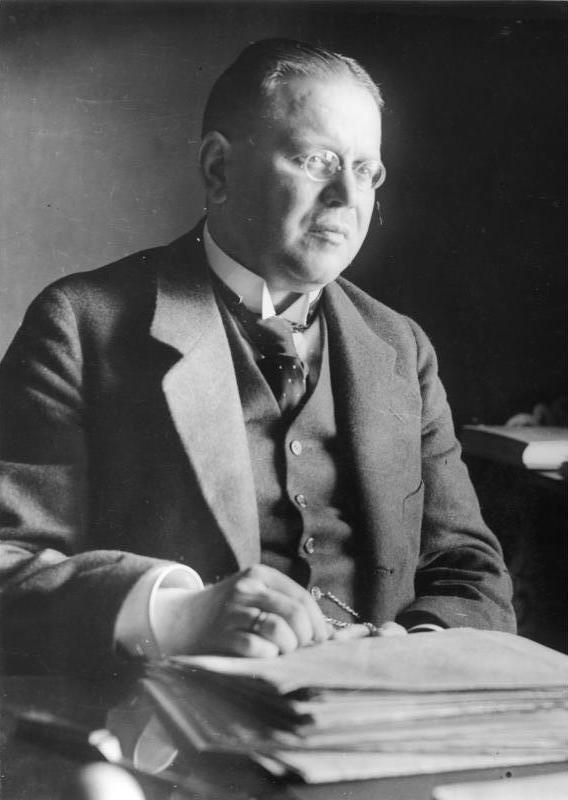
Matthias Erzberger (Centre), Minister without portfolio

Following the collapse of the German Empire and the German Revolution of 1918–1919, the Germans voted in elections for the Weimar National Assembly on 19 January 1919. At the time, the country was governed by the Council of the People's Deputies, a revolutionary government made up of members of the Social Democratic Party of Germany (SPD), which had been the largest party in the Imperial Reichstag following the last elections in 1912. The January elections returned a smaller than expected share of the vote for the socialists (38% for the SPD and 7% for the more radical Independent Social Democratic Party (USPD); the German Communist Party (KPD) boycotted the elections.

The National Assembly, meeting in Weimar because conditions in the capital Berlin were deemed too chaotic for the deliberations and because Weimar was associated with Weimar Classicism, acted as a unicameral legislature and the constituent assembly for the new republic. After its inaugural session on 6 February, it passed a provisional constitution called the Law on Provisional Reich Power. Friedrich Ebert (SPD), chairman of the Council of the People's Deputies, was elected as temporary president, or head of state, on 11 February. That same day, Ebert asked his fellow deputy Philipp Scheidemann (SPD) to form the new government, referred to in the law as the Reich Ministry.

At that point, coalition negotiations had been going on for some time. The SPD was talking to the DDP and the Centre Party. It was making cooperation conditional on the acceptance by the "bourgeois" parties of a republican form of state, a fiscal policy that would "severely" target wealth, and a socialisation of "suitable" industries. Although the SPD did approach the USPD, Ebert reportedly said that he had conducted talks with the extreme left only so that they would bear the responsibility for the talks' failure. For their part, the DDP would not have accepted a coalition with the USPD.

The negotiations were difficult and lengthy. The presidency of the National Assembly was, in particular, hotly contested and almost caused the talks to fail. It was finally agreed that Eduard David (SPD), who was the Assembly's first president, would resign and, in compensation, join the cabinet, making way for the former president of the Imperial Reichstag, Constantin Fehrenbach (Centre Party) to head the Assembly.

Apart from Ebert himself – who said that he preferred the more representative office of head of state – Scheidemann was the clear favourite to become head of government. With the exception of Ebert, all the other people's deputies from the Council joined the new cabinet. Gustav Noske had previously been in charge of Army and Navy affairs, and he became Reichswehr (armed forces) minister. Otto Landsberg, the leading thinker on law on the Council, became Minister of Justice. Rudolf Wissell had been in charge of economic affairs and kept the portfolio. Gustav Bauer had been a member of the Baden cabinet in charge of the newly formed Labour Ministry, a position he continued to hold through the revolution. Robert Schmidt (minister for Food and Agriculture) and Eduard David, with no portfolio but charged with looking into the question of what responsibility Germany had in bringing about the Great War, completed the SPD members of the cabinet.

Against seven members from the SPD, there were three from the DDP (Hugo Preuß, Georg Gothein and Eugen Schiffer) and three from the Centre Party (Johannes Giesberts, Johannes Bell and Matthias Erzberger). Schiffer had been a member of the National Liberal Party and served as state secretary for the Treasury Department in the Empire, but had joined the DDP after the November revolution. Erzberger had been a member of the Baden cabinet, had negotiated the Armistice in November 1918 and remained in charge of negotiations with the Allies.

In the coalition talks, Ulrich von Brockdorff-Rantzau was treated as a member of the DDP, although he did not belong to the party. He was a career diplomat, and in January 1919, Ebert and Scheidemann asked him to take over the Foreign Office.

In addition to these fourteen politicians, there were three members of the military who had an ex officio seat at the cabinet table but no right to vote in its decisions. They were the Prussian minister of war, since early January 1919, Colonel Walther Reinhardt, Lieutenant-Colonel Joseph Koeth, who headed the Ministry for Economic Demobilisation (i.e. was in charge of the transition from a war economy to a peacetime economy), and the head of the Navy. Initially, the latter position was held by the acting state secretary for the Navy, who had no official standing in the cabinet at all. After the Imperial Navy Office was dissolved and replaced with the Admiralty in March 1919, Head of the Admiralty Adolf von Trotha became a non-voting member of the cabinet.

Two features of the cabinet are conspicuous: the balance of power between seven SPD members and seven representatives (if Brockdorff-Rantzau is counted as DDP) from the "bourgeois" parties, and the strong continuity in the personnel of government, especially considering the fact that the country had just gone through a revolution. Seven members of the Scheidemann cabinet had been state secretary or undersecretary under the final imperial government of Max von Baden (Scheidemann himself, Schiffer, Bauer, Schmidt, Giesberts, David and Erzberger). Another six had held offices under the Council of the People's Deputies (Brockdorff-Rantzau, Preuß, Wissell, Noske, Landsberg and Koeth). Among the Social Democrats, the moderates or conservative "reformists" predominated. This configuration enabled the government to draw on considerable experience in government and administration, but it underscored the distance between the government and some of the driving forces behind the revolution, notably the unions, the far left and many common workers. The Scheidemann cabinet was nevertheless based on parties representing more than 75% of all voters. No other government of the Weimar Republic would ever have a larger majority in Parliament (the Reichstag).

== Members ==
The members of the cabinet (known collectively as the Reich ministry) were as follows:

Portfolio	Minister	Took office	Left office	Party
Minister-President (Note: Equivalent to chancellor under the Weimar Constitution)	Philipp Scheidemann	13 February 1919	20 June 1919	SPD
Deputy Minister-President	Eugen Schiffer (Note: There is contradictory information on whether Schiffer officially resigned on 11 or 19 April. According to Dederke (Appendix: Table 21), Dernburg took over at Finance on 19 April but as deputy minister-president only on 30 April.)	13 February 1919	19 April 1919	DDP
Deputy Minister-President	Bernhard Dernburg	30 April 1919	20 June 1919	DDP
Foreign Affairs	Ulrich von Brockdorff-Rantzau	13 February 1919	20 June 1919	Independent
Interior	Hugo Preuß	13 February 1919	20 June 1919	DDP
Justice	Otto Landsberg	13 February 1919	20 June 1919	SPD
Labour	Gustav Bauer	13 February 1919	20 June 1919	SPD
Reichswehr	Gustav Noske	13 February 1919	20 June 1919	SPD
Economic Affairs	Rudolf Wissell	13 February 1919	20 June 1919	SPD
Finance	Eugen Schiffer	13 February 1919	19 April 1919	DDP
Finance	Bernhard Dernburg	19 April 1919	20 June 1919	DDP
Treasury	Georg Gothein	21 March 1919	20 June 1919	DDP
Food and Agriculture	Robert Schmidt	13 February 1919	20 June 1919	SPD
Postal Affairs	Johannes Giesberts	13 February 1919	20 June 1919	Centre
Colonial Affairs	Johannes Bell	13 February 1919	20 June 1919	Centre
Without portfolio	Eduard David	13 February 1919	20 June 1919	SPD
Without portfolio	Matthias Erzberger	13 February 1919	20 June 1919	Centre
Without portfolio	Georg Gothein	13 February 1919	21 March 1919	DDP
Economic Demobilisation (non-voting)	Joseph Koeth	13 February 1919	30 April 1919 (Note: Ministry dissolved)	Independent
Prussian Minister of War (non-voting)	Walther Reinhardt	13 February 1919	20 June 1919	Independent
Chief of the Admiralty (Note: The Admiralty was created in March 1919 as the successor to the Imperial Naval Office. Its head, Vice Admiral Maximilian Rogge, was acting state secretary for the Navy and, although not a member of the cabinet, had consistently taken part in cabinet meetings.) (non-voting)	Adolf von Trotha	27 March 1919	20 June 1919	Independent

== Legal position and differences with other cabinets of the German Reich ==
The legal position of the Scheidemann cabinet was different from both its predecessors under the Empire and those that followed it. Since it was set up to operate only as a transitional government until the new constitution came into force, it was provisional and improvised in nature. The Law on Provisional Reich Power that established it was quite vague in many respects. The cabinet's role was mentioned only as follows:

- §2: For bringing government proposals to the National Assembly, the assent of the States Committee, the chamber in which the individual states were represented, was needed. If no consensus could be found between the cabinet and the States Committee, both versions would be submitted.
- §3: Members of the government had the right to attend sessions of the National Assembly and to speak there at any time.
- §8: For the purpose of governance, the president was to appoint a governmental ministry which would be in charge of all government agencies, including the Army High Command (OHL). The ministers were required to possess the confidence of the National Assembly.
- §9: All decrees and executive orders of the president required the counter-signature of a minister. The ministers were accountable to the National Assembly for the conduct of their affairs.

It remained unclear what the consequences would be if a minister lost the confidence of the National Assembly. The most obvious difference between the system under the old Empire and with future cabinets under the Weimar Constitution was that the government was based on the principle of equality between all its members (a collegial cabinet). Since the minister president (equivalent to the chancellor under the Weimar Constitution) was not mentioned in the law, he lacked any special powers and real standing. In fact, he was not much more than a moderator. By contrast, under the old system, all the state secretaries had reported directly to the chancellor. He was the only "minister" and accountable to the emperor and, after the change in the constitution in October 1918, to the Reichstag.

The Transition Act of 4 March 1919 clarified the legal position of the existing body of law and its relation to those laws passed by the National Assembly. It also stipulated that the old imperial constitution was still valid unless it was in contradiction to a newer law. The constitutional position of the Reichstag was taken over by the National Assembly, that of the Bundesrat by the States Committee, the emperor was replaced by the president and the ministry replaced the chancellor. The powers previously vested in the centralised position of the chancellor were distributed to all members of the cabinet, who were independently responsible for their portfolios. This played a crucial role in the quarrels and the lack of cooperation that were to become a defining feature of the Scheidemann cabinet.

Finally, the Decree of the Reich President Concerning the Establishment and Designation of the Supreme Reich Authorities of 21 March 1919 established the various portfolios within the government. It also added a confusing new contradiction by allocating the responsibility for "conducting the affairs of the Reich" to the Reich ministry, whilst the original Transition Act had allocated the task to the president. The decree also mentioned the minister president for the first time.

== Internal and external security ==
As the Spartacist uprising in Berlin had amply demonstrated, the domestic security situation in Germany remained highly volatile in early 1919. Shortly after the cabinet took office, what became known as the Berlin March Battles erupted in the capital. In addition to these civil-war-like challenges to the parliamentary government by the leftist workers' councils that wanted to establish a dictatorship of the councils (Räterepublik), there were separatist movements at work in several parts of the country. One of the government's primary tasks thus was to restore law and order and to ensure that the population throughout Germany accepted it as the legitimate authority.

=== Left-wing uprisings ===
The strong showing of the Weimar Coalition parties in the elections of 19 January 1919 was another disappointment for the radical left after the KPD and USPD had been further roused to anger against the government by the bloody suppression of the Spartacist uprising. Between February and May 1919, numerous "wild" strikes (i.e., without union authorisation), armed uprisings and occupation of plants (especially in the mining industry around Halle and in the Ruhr) took place. The workers and their leaders demanded preservation and expansion of the council system, the socialisation of key industries, democratisation of the military via soldiers' councils, higher wages and better working conditions. The government used paramilitary and regular troops to crush left-wing uprisings and council republics. In February, government forces occupied the North Sea ports. Also in February, Freikorps and regular units moved into central Germany and subsequently occupied Gotha and Halle. In April, Magdeburg, Helmstadt and Braunschweig were taken, followed by Leipzig and Eisenach in May and Erfurt in June.

In Berlin, the radical left parties organised a general strike to achieve the democratisation of the armed forces. The KPD tried to turn the strike into an insurrection. This resulted in a state of emergency being declared. On 9 March, Reichswehr Minister Gustav Noske, endowed with executive power, authorised the military and police to shoot instantly "anyone encountered who is fighting government troops with arms". Around 1,000 people died in the Berlin March Battles.

In Bavaria, a council republic called the Bavarian Soviet Republic had been declared, and the government saw a serious risk of the state seceding from Germany. In mid-April, the government intervened militarily, and Munich was taken on 1 May. Once again, hundreds of people, including many civilians, were killed in the fighting. The left-wing uprisings were accompanied by widespread strikes that escalated to a form of civil war in some parts of the country, notably in the Ruhr area. The strikes and resulting economic disruptions were a serious threat to Germany's stability, as the supply of food to the population was already tenuous. Since the Allies had threatened to cut off food shipments to a striking Germany and any losses in tax income would make it harder yet to comply with their demands, the strikes were directly endangering negotiations about extensions of the Armistice.

=== Separatist movements ===
In the west, the occupied Rhineland had been transformed by the Armistice into an area in which the German government was without any effective power. Anti-Prussian and pro-French sentiment ran high among some members of the middle class in the Rhineland and this was used by the French and Belgian occupation forces to foster separatist tendencies. The cabinet could react to requests for aid or action from that part of the country mainly by issuing declarations and protest notes to the Allies or by public agitation. The scope even for these responses was limited, as the Allies might have treated them as violations of the Armistice. The government's appointment of a Reich and state commissioner for the occupied territory was just a political gesture. The government had to work through other channels, such as the National Assembly delegates from the area, local dignitaries or the local organisations of the Weimar Coalition parties.

The situation was even more complicated in the eastern provinces of Prussia. There were obvious separatist groups at work, although paradoxically they arose from patriotic sentiments. German bureaucrats, officers, people's councils (set up in response to similar institutions among the Poles) and refugees from Posen were developing various ideas for a German or German-Polish eastern state (Oststaat) should the Treaty of Versailles be signed. Although the plans were inconsistent and contradictory, the general idea was that by temporarily exiting Germany, these parts (East Prussia, West Prussia, the Netzedistrikt, Silesia and Posen) should deal with the political and military challenges offered by the Greater Poland Uprising without being bound by the diplomatic shackles imposed on Germany itself. A new state incorporating East and West Prussia as well as Livland, Kurland and Lithuania was also mooted, drawing on earlier ideas of a United Baltic Duchy.

At the time, the Province of Posen was almost completely occupied by Polish forces. Despite a German-Polish armistice, there were constant skirmishes along the line of control. Troop concentrations on both sides threatened an escalation of the situation and, due to the relative strength of the forces involved, a reconquest of Posen and possibly even further advances by German troops seemed likely. Although this was primarily a problem for the government of Prussia, the cabinet had to deal with the issue due to the danger of unauthorised action by the German army or by refugees from Posen. Initially trying to appease the separatists with political gestures, the cabinet soon had to re-evaluate the situation as more serious. It considered channelling the political forces in the eastern provinces towards a plebiscite about remaining in Germany. The Prussian government opposed the plan, fearing that a majority might decide against continued membership in the Reich. The idea of a plebiscite was then dropped. Opposition from the cabinet (especially Gustav Noske), President Friedrich Ebert and Wilhelm Groener of the Army High Command at Kolberg helped prevent a secession or a unilateral military move against Poland in the summer of 1919. Prussian Minister of War Walther Reinhardt, however, had been a firm supporter of the plan for an eastern state.

== Economic policies ==
=== General issues ===
A major matter of dispute in the cabinet was the field of economic policy, notably the basic choice of which economic system was to prevail in the new republic. The SPD was still a socialist party at the time, based on Marxist ideas as laid down in the Erfurt Program of 1891: once the proletariat had won control over the government, major industrial enterprises were to be socialised (nationalised) in order to achieve the "socialisation of the means of production". The radicalism of the approach was softened somewhat by the theory of "revisionism", by that time dominant in the SPD. It focused on short-term reformist progress rather than on the achievement of long-term goals through revolutionary action.

By contrast, the DDP ministers and some from the Centre Party (especially Matthias Erzberger) subscribed to a liberal, market-oriented view of the economy. According to this approach, the main goal of economic policy was to maximise productivity. This implied a rapid dismantling of the command economy that had been created during the war years, as well as an end to capital and currency controls and to trade barriers.

Matters were complicated further by a third school of thought that dominated thinking by many in the Ministry of Economic Affairs at the time, notably that of Walther Rathenau and Wichard von Moellendorff. The concept of common economic policy combined private property rights with a strong element of central planning and a forced syndication (i.e., association) of industries organised by the state. All those involved in the production processes, including the workers, were to play a role in the administration of the industries. Government control of foreign trade was also a key aspect of the policy.

The three approaches to economic policy were almost mutually exclusive. Gustav Bauer (Labour) and Richard Schmidt (Food and Agriculture) subscribed to views based on the SPD's Erfurt Program. Georg Gothein (Treasury) and Eugen Schiffer and Bernhard Dernburg (Finance) were free-market liberals. Rudolf Wissell (Economic Affairs) advocated the common economic policy. To avoid a serious confrontation, the coalition partners kept the economic policies of the cabinet intentionally vague. This became evident in Scheidemann's government declaration of 13 February, which steered clear of topics like foreign trade and currency altogether. Although it prevented a clash over the cabinet's internal differences, it meant that important decisions on economic policies were not taken by the cabinet but left to individual ministers who would then often come into conflict with each other. The tendency was reinforced by the constitutional equality of the ministers. A direct result was bitter disputes over who was in charge of specific policy issues, made worse by personal animosities between some of the ministers.

Scheidemann's government declaration included policies such as improvements in educational standards, the establishment of a people's army, adequate provision for war widows and war-wounded servicemen, establishing the universal right of association in the constitution, acquiring new land for settlement, heavy taxation of wartime profits, and making a start to the planned improvement "of public health, protection of mothers, and care of children and young people."

In March 1919, strikes in the Ruhr, central Germany and Berlin caused the government to announce placating measures that were more in line with Wissell's views than with the liberal or socialist approaches. Wissell used the opportunity to push forward a socialisation program as well as rules for the coal and potash industries. It would be the first and only victory for the advocates of the common economic policy. In April, a law that was to set up the regulation of the paper industry was first changed substantially by the cabinet and then rejected by the National Assembly.

In May, the DDP members of the cabinet attempted to rein in the Ministry of Economic Affairs by making use of a conflict between Wissell and Schmidt concerning international trade policy. The Brussels Agreement (March 1919) with the Allies governed imports of food on which Germany depended. To ensure that funds for the food imports would be available, the cabinet created a committee called the Dictatorial Economic Committee consisting of Wissell, Gothein and Schmidt. Two votes were required to approve a decision. The committee's decisions on trade and currencies would have the same binding power as cabinet decrees. Wissell was regularly outvoted by the other two. On 6 May, Dernburg announced publicly that the committee would eliminate the wartime coercive industry structures, an important foundation of Wissell's policies. The next day, Wissell wrote a protest note to Scheidemann, demanded an SPD-only cabinet and threatened to resign. He also presented a memorandum and program of action that summarised the common economic policy approach. Schmidt and Gothein responded by presenting opposing memoranda. Before the row could escalate, the Allies informed the Germans about the content of the Treaty of Versailles, and the cabinet turned its focus to that issue. Wissell remained on the defensive against those favouring a liberalisation of foreign trade and was unable to push through his views. He did succeed in winning a sort of ceasefire on the issue of abolishing currency controls on 7 June, when the cabinet would be in office for only another two weeks.

The differences on economic policy within the cabinet were large enough to have brought about a breakup of the coalition sooner or later if the issue of the Treaty had not caused its resignation. Economics was, nevertheless, the only field of policy in which the cabinet engaged in medium to long-term thinking. Otherwise, the cabinet was mostly concerned with dealing with urgent short-term issues (e.g., assistance for the unemployed, veterans and the wounded or a severe lack of agricultural workers) and taking ad hoc decisions.

=== Fiscal policy ===
The ad hoc approach is applied in particular to fiscal policy. Moving Germany's finances from a war footing to a peacetime setting, dealing with the huge rise in public debt caused by the war and closing the large budget deficit were daunting challenges. Yet any systematic approach was impossible given the degree of uncertainty about the contents of the peace treaty. Neither the coming burden from reparations nor – given the prospect of territorial losses – Germany's future productive capacity was known to the government. A significant fiscal reform would have required the transfer of taxation powers (such as income, corporate and inheritance) from the individual states to the central government, since under the Empire, the central government had been dependent on fiscal contributions from the states. Since opposition from the states was to be expected, any progress in that direction was unlikely until the fundamental changes of the new constitution came into force. Fiscal reform thus took place only after the Weimar Constitution was enacted (Erzberger's finance reforms), but Schiffer and Dernburg did some important preparatory work, and the Scheidemann cabinet discussed their proposals. Some of the bills were introduced in the National Assembly under Scheidemann's government, but only debated once he had resigned.

=== Social policy ===
A lack of fiscal resources combined with contradictory views in the cabinet also prevented new initiatives in social policy, which was in contrast to the activist approach taken by the cabinet's predecessor, the socialist Council of the People's Deputies. Laws prepared but not debated or passed by the cabinet included a codification of all labour laws and a first draft of the law on work councils. Short-term measures mostly fell into the purview of the Ministry of Economic Demobilisation, and it was authorised to take most decisions by simple decree with no need for a cabinet decision. After its dissolution, the powers passed to the relevant ministries, in the case of social policy, to the Ministry of Labour.

== Foreign policy, armistice and Paris Peace Conference ==
Foreign policy in early 1919 was focused on the armistice and the subsequent peace treaty. At the time, Germany had diplomatic relations with only a few neutral countries (e.g., Switzerland and the Netherlands), Austria and some countries in Eastern Europe. Relations with the latter were mainly influenced by the presence of German troops in the Baltic states, based on Art. XII of the Armistice (which required the German forces to remain in place as a bulwark against Soviet advances).

=== Armistice negotiations ===
Since November 1918, a permanent armistice commission, led by Matthias Erzberger, was at work negotiating with the Allies on interpretations of the agreed articles and on prolongations of the armistice (it was extended on 13 December 1918, 16 January 1919, and 16 February 1919).

On 16 February, the cabinet voted to reject the conditions for the third extension of the armistice as suggested by Foreign Minister Brockdorff-Rantzau. It was deemed unacceptable that the Germans should be barred from resisting Polish military action in Posen and in other places as long as the Allies refused to guarantee an end to hostilities on the part of the Poles. Whilst the Foreign Minister was willing to refrain from offensive military action, he thought formal acceptance of a line-of-control to be a degrading loss of sovereignty and the new policy of the Allies in regard to Poland to be in violation of Wilson's Fourteen Points. Intervention by the leaders of the coalition parties caused a change of mind, and the cabinet decided to sign the third prolongation (this time indefinite). Brockdorff-Rantzau considered resigning. The cabinet decided to hand over a note of protest to the Allies, and the final version of the prolongation included some of the changes to the line-of-control requested by the German side.

Subsequently, the cabinet largely left it to Erzberger's commission to negotiate with the Allies over the situation in Posen. Similarly, the cabinet was not closely involved in the Brussels Food Convention of 14 March 1919, which secured much-needed Allied food shipments to Germany. By contrast, the cabinet dealt at length with the issue of whether to move the Polish Blue Army from France to Poland by sea via Danzig due to concerns that it might seize Western Prussia and thus cause the loss of a second province to Poland before the final peace treaty. In the end, the troops were transported across Germany by land (which still caused substantial resentment among Germans from Posen).

=== Paris conference and peace treaty ===
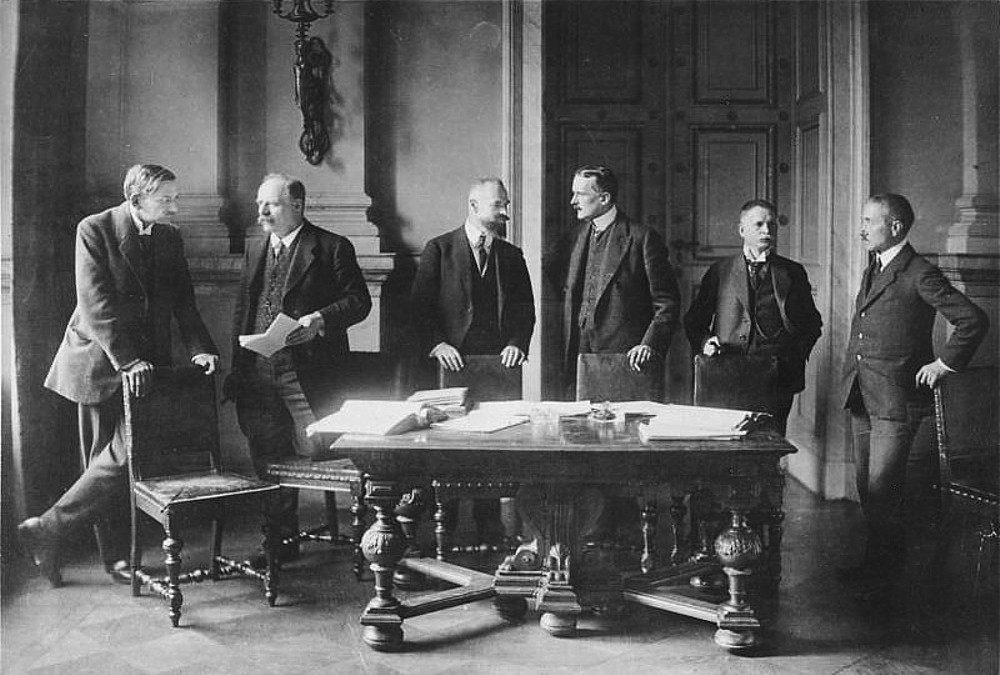
The German delegation at the Paris conference. From left to right, Walther Schücking, Johannes Giesberts, Otto Landsberg, Ulrich von Brockdorff-Rantzau, Robert Leinert, Karl Melchior (1919)

The cabinet focused primarily on the peace treaty. Out of a total of 450 items in the official cabinet minutes, 170 dealt with this issue. Unlike the way the armistice commission was handled – allowing it to become a sort of parallel government – the cabinet was to directly control the peace delegation. The delegation would possess authority to negotiate only within the confines of the Fourteen Points (as interpreted by the Germans). Anything that went beyond the required approval of the cabinet, especially the basic decision on acceptance or rejection of the treaty.

The cabinet thus held two basic premises: that there would be negotiations and that they would be based on Wilson's fourteen points. There is no evidence that alternative plans for the delegation were made in case the expectations turned out to be wrong. The main reason for such expectations was bad information that fed wishful thinking. The German government was virtually in the dark about what had been decided in Paris in the negotiations between the Allies and their associated states. The cabinet's main sources of information were newspapers and reports by diplomatic staff from neutral countries, both relying heavily on rumours.

Preparations for peace negotiations had begun under Brockdorff-Rantzau's lead even before the cabinet was formed. By 27 January 1919, the Council of the People's Deputies had in hand an initial draft on the German position. It was altered multiple times before being finalised on 21 April 1919 as "Guidelines for the German Peace Negotiators". On 21/22 March 1919, the cabinet debated the individual points at length, and the meeting minutes show significant differences in position between various members of the cabinet.

Important organisational issues had also been settled before the cabinet took office. There would be a six-person delegation, supported by a substantial staff of commissioners from the ministries, plus experts. In addition, an office of around 160 people was set up in Berlin, attached to the Foreign Office and led by Johann Heinrich von Bernstorff, working on questions of detail. It also served as a nexus between the delegation and the cabinet.

The cabinet had difficulties agreeing on who was to fill the positions. The members of the delegation were changed several times and even the identity of its leader was not determined until the last moment (both Brockdorff-Rantzau and Otto Landsberg were named in drafts). The composition of the delegation caused significant bad blood between Erzberger and Brockdorff-Rantzau.

On 18 April, French General Alphonse Nudant handed over to the German armistice commission the invitation to Versailles. It was a shock to the cabinet, as the Germans were only to "receive" the draft of the treaty. The cabinet answered that it would send three civil servants, noting that their task would be simply to transmit the treaty to the government. In response, General Foch demanded that the Germans send delegates who were empowered to "negotiate the entirety of questions related to the peace". The cabinet now named the delegation that arrived in Versailles on 29 April: Brockdorff-Rantzau (chairman), Landsberg, Johannes Giesberts, plus non-cabinet members Carl Melchior, a banker, Robert Leinert, president of the Prussian constituent assembly and mayor of Hanover, and Walther Schücking, an expert in international law.

Despite prior efforts to regulate the relationship between the cabinet and delegation and the personal presence of several cabinet members in Paris, there was significant disunity between the two institutions. There were three main reasons for this: For one, the rules for the delegation had assumed that there would be face-to-face negotiations, yet despite the fact that the Allied note from 20 April mentioned "negotiations", the representatives of the Entente now refused to meet the German delegates. Further, the Fourteen Points, which were to delimit the delegation's authority, were quite general in many respects, giving scope for delegation and for the cabinet to argue about jurisdiction. Finally, the personal differences between Erzberger and Brockdorff-Rantzau, as well as the latter's hyper-sensitivity regarding encroachments on his authority, played a role.

The delegation received the Allied conditions for peace on 7 May. Rather than waiting for a comprehensive German counterproposal, it started to send the Allies numerous notes on individual points, most of which were disavowed by the cabinet. Brockdorff-Rantzau complained about the interference by the cabinet, which caused the government to forbid the further use of such notes on 20 May. The delegation ignored the order, and after threats of resignation by several cabinet ministers, Scheidemann and some other members had to travel to Spa to meet with the delegation and settle the differences.

Issues that caused friction between the delegation and the cabinet were the question of whether or not the reparation payments should be fixed in absolute terms and the question of German disarmament. The latter caused a serious confrontation with the military. The original idea had been to propose a land army of 300,000 men, later reduced to 200,000, then 100,000. Just as with the issue of reparations, the cabinet thought that by complaisance in this respect, they could limit German territorial losses. The military, notably General Hans von Seeckt (commissioner of the Prussian Minister of War at the delegation), objected vehemently. The cabinet, especially Gustav Noske, stood their ground on the issue. Other controversies involved the question of responsibility for the war and the possibility of bringing about an intervention by neutral countries in the case of unacceptable Allied demands (an idea of Erzberger's vigorously opposed by the Foreign Minister), which caused Colonial Minister Johannes Bell to travel to Versailles on 2 June in order to mediate.

In the end, it turned out that all the arguments between the cabinet and the delegation had been pointless. On 16 June, the Allies presented the final version of their conditions for peace. In virtually no respect had the Allied demands been scaled back compared to the first draft of 7 May. The sole exception was the acceptance of a plebiscite in Upper Silesia. The negotiations in Versailles had been negotiations in name only.

== Allied ultimatum and resignation of the cabinet ==
=== Initial position on the draft Treaty ===
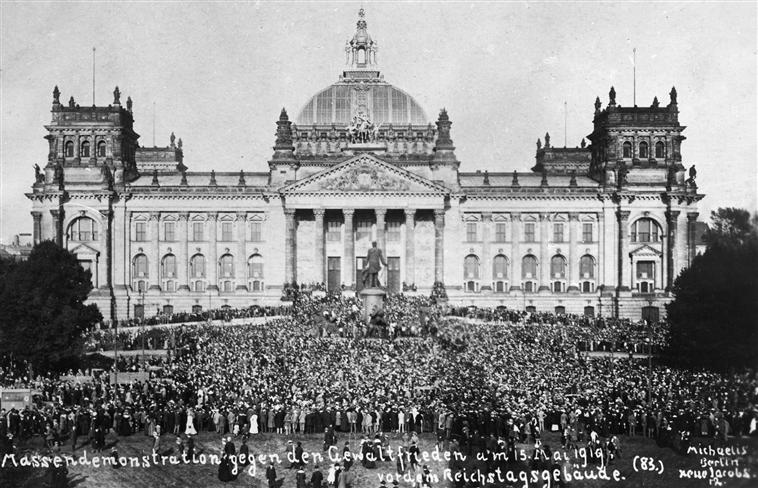
Mass demonstration against the Versailles Peace Treaty in front of the Reichstag building, 15 May 1919

In May, the cabinet decided to refrain from making an immediate statement in reaction to the initial Allied draft of the Peace Treaty, hoping to achieve changes through negotiations. However, Scheidemann himself said that the Treaty was "intolerable" and "unfulfillable". On 12 May, he called it "unacceptable" in the National Assembly, to the acclaim of almost all the parties. In the cabinet, it was in particular the representatives of the DDP who threatened to resign unless the Treaty was rejected. Yet the cabinet decision specifically ruled out acceptance of the Treaty only "in its current form". On the third and fourth of June, the cabinet had a discussion about the possibility that the Allies would refuse to make any significant changes to the Treaty. Only Erzberger, David, Wissell and Noske clearly favoured signing in that case; all others were (to different degrees) opposed. Even at that stage, Wissell noted that the Scheidemann cabinet would not be able to sign and that a replacement government would have to be established.

At least since late May, the cabinet had seriously discussed the ramifications of a German refusal to sign. In that case, the cabinet expected Allied troops to occupy Germany. Detailed contingency plans for such a scenario were not made to avoid providing the USPD, which had argued for signing the Treaty, with political ammunition. Since the OHL (High Command) planned to move all German troops to the east of the Elbe river should there be a resumption of hostilities, the cabinet was concerned about the actions of those states left unprotected by the strategy (Bavaria, Hesse, Baden and Württemberg). They feared leftist uprisings and/or a separate peace by these states.

=== Reaction to the Allied ultimatum of 16 June ===
On 16 June, the Allies gave the German side five days to accept the treaty (later extended to seven days). The cabinet then faced a stark choice between acceptance, refusal or resignation. According to the Peace Delegation's assessment, the final Treaty was not in any meaningful way different from the version deemed "unacceptable" in May. Ultimately, however, the choice between acceptance and refusal rested with the majority parties and the National Assembly. Over the next several days, there seem to have been constant discussions between members of the cabinet, President Ebert, the Peace Delegation, and party representatives.

The chronological order is somewhat uncertain but has been reconstructed as follows: On the morning of 18 June, the Peace Delegation returned to Weimar, Brockdorff-Rantzau reported to the cabinet and presented the common assessment of the delegation. After discussions in the parliamentary groups of the parties, the cabinet met again in the evening. There was no consensus on signing the Treaty. A vote showed that the cabinet was split (7 to 7 according to Erzberger's recollection; 8 for and 6 against signature, according to Landsberg). Since the cabinet was unable to reach a decision, the parties had to decide.

An important influence was the possibility (or lack thereof) of resuming hostilities against the Allies with any hope of success. As early as 21 May, the OHL had surveyed the regional commanders on the question, with a clearly negative response. General Wilhelm Groener consequently argued in favour of signing the Treaty. He thus opposed the position of Prussian Minister of War Reinhardt as well as the majority of Reichswehr commanders who, at a meeting on 19 June, went so far as to openly threaten a revolt against the government should the Treaty be signed. Paul von Hindenburg, who was nominally in charge of the OHL, deferred to Groener on the issue. The position of the OHL provided significant, if not decisive, support for those favouring the signature of the Treaty.

On 19 June, majorities of the parliamentary groups of the SPD and Centre Party expressed support for signing, but the DDP was opposed. Later that day, the cabinet held a meeting with the States Committee, where a majority of the states supported acceptance of the Treaty. The crucial meeting of the cabinet took place that evening with the participation of party representatives. The DDP had prepared a mediation proposal to be handed to the Allies, which included substantial changes to some of the Treaty's stipulations. If it were accepted by the Allies, the DDP was willing to sign the Treaty. However, the cabinet was unable to reach a consensus on the issue. With no solution in sight, Scheidemann ended the meeting around midnight, went to see President Ebert and announced his resignation, along with Landsberg and Brockdorff-Rantzau.

The cabinet remained in office for another day and a half, since there were difficulties in forming a new government that was willing to take responsibility for signing the Treaty. The DDP insisted on transmitting its proposal to the Allies, and it was almost sent, but was vetoed by the SPD at the last minute. Hermann Müller and Eduard David were both considered as the new minister president. On the morning of 21 June, when the DDP finally decided not to participate in the new government, Gustav Bauer was ready to lead an SPD and Centre Party cabinet that was willing to sign. The term of office of the Scheidemann cabinet ended on 20 June. The first cabinet meeting of the Bauer cabinet was on 21 June.

== Bibliopgraphy ==
- Dederke, K., Reich und Republik – Deutschland 1917–1933 (German), Klett-Cotta, Stuttgart, 1996, ISBN 3-608-91802-7.
- Das Kabinett Scheidemann – 13 Februar bis 20 Juni 1919, edited by Hagen Schulze, Boppard am Rhein (Haraldt Boldt Verlag), 1971 (=Akten der Reichskanzlei, 1) Online version (German).
- Schieck, H., Der Kampf um die deutsche Wirtschaftspolitik nach dem Novemberumsturz 1918 (German), Heidelberg, 1958.
- Schieck, H., Die Behandlung der Sozialisierungsfrage in den Monaten nach dem Staatsumsturz (German), in: Kolb, E. (ed.), Vom Kaiserreich zur Republik, Neue Wissenschaftliche Bibliothek 49, Köln, 1972, pp. 138–164.
