= Hugo Preuß =

German lawyer and politician (1860–1925)

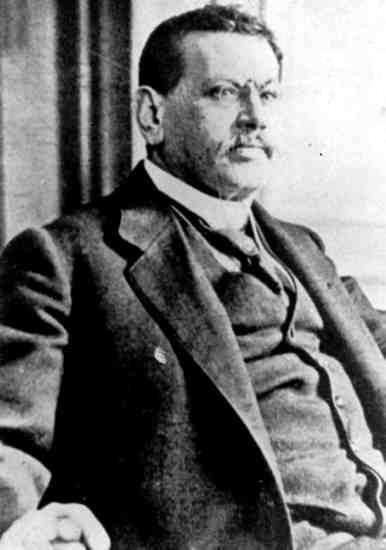

Reich Minister of the Interior Weimar Republic
- In office 13 February 1919 – 20 June 1919
- Chancellor: Philipp Scheidemann
- Preceded by: Friedrich Ebert (Council of the People's Deputies)
- Succeeded by: Eduard David

Personal details
- Born: 28 October 1860 Berlin, Kingdom of Prussia
- Died: 9 October 1925 (aged 64) Berlin, Weimar Republic
- Party: German Democratic Party
- Education: University of Berlin, University of Heidelberg

Hugo Preuß (Preuss) (28 October 1860 – 9 October 1925) was a German lawyer and liberal politician. He was the author of the draft version of the constitution that was passed by the Weimar National Assembly and came into force in August 1919. He based it on three principles: all political authority belongs to the people; that the state should be organized on a federal basis; and that the Reich should form a democratic Rechtsstaat (state based in law) within the international community.

== Early life and academic career ==
Hugo Preuß was born in Berlin on 28 October 1860 as the only child of Levin Preuß (1820 or 21 – 1862), a Jewish owner of a lithographic business, and his wife Minna (née Israel, 1826–1899). Hugo's father died in 1862 and in 1863 his mother married her husband's brother, Leopold Preuß (1827–1905), a well-off grain merchant. After growing up in the western part of Berlin, Hugo attended university from 1878 at Berlin and Heidelberg, studying law and political science, with additional courses on history and philosophy. In May 1883, he passed the first state examination and in November was awarded the doctorate of law at Göttingen. He stopped working as a legal trainee in 1886 and chose a career as an academic teacher. In 1889, he was habilitated with his publication Gemeinde, Staat, Reich als Gebietskörperschaften ('Municipality, State, Reich as Local Authorities') and began working as a lecturer at the university in Berlin. Although the quality of his writings was appreciated by academia, his Jewish religion and democratic-liberal views prevented him from becoming a tenured professor at the conservative Berlin university.

In 1889 Preuß married Else Liebermann, daughter of Carl Liebermann in Berlin. She was related to Max Liebermann, the painter, and to the historian Felix Liebermann. Hugo and Else had four sons, one of whom died early. The others were Ernst (1891), Kurt (1893) and Jean (Hans, 1901).

In 1895 he became a member of the municipal parliament in Charlottenburg, Berlin. Not until 1906 did Preuß become a full professor, at the Berlin School of Commerce, newly founded by local merchants. He taught there until 1918 when he became headmaster. His main focus was on constitutional law and local self-government. In 1906, the first volume of Die Entwicklung des deutschen Städtewesens ('The Development of German Urban Areas') was published. From 1910–1918, he was honorary city councillor for the Progressive People's Party (FVP). In that capacity he contributed to the project that would later become the Greater Berlin Act. In 1912 he unsuccessfully ran for a seat in the Reichstag. In his widely read publication Das deutsche Volk und die Politik ('The German People and Politics') of 1915, he forcefully argued for a transformation of the authoritarian state into a people's state.

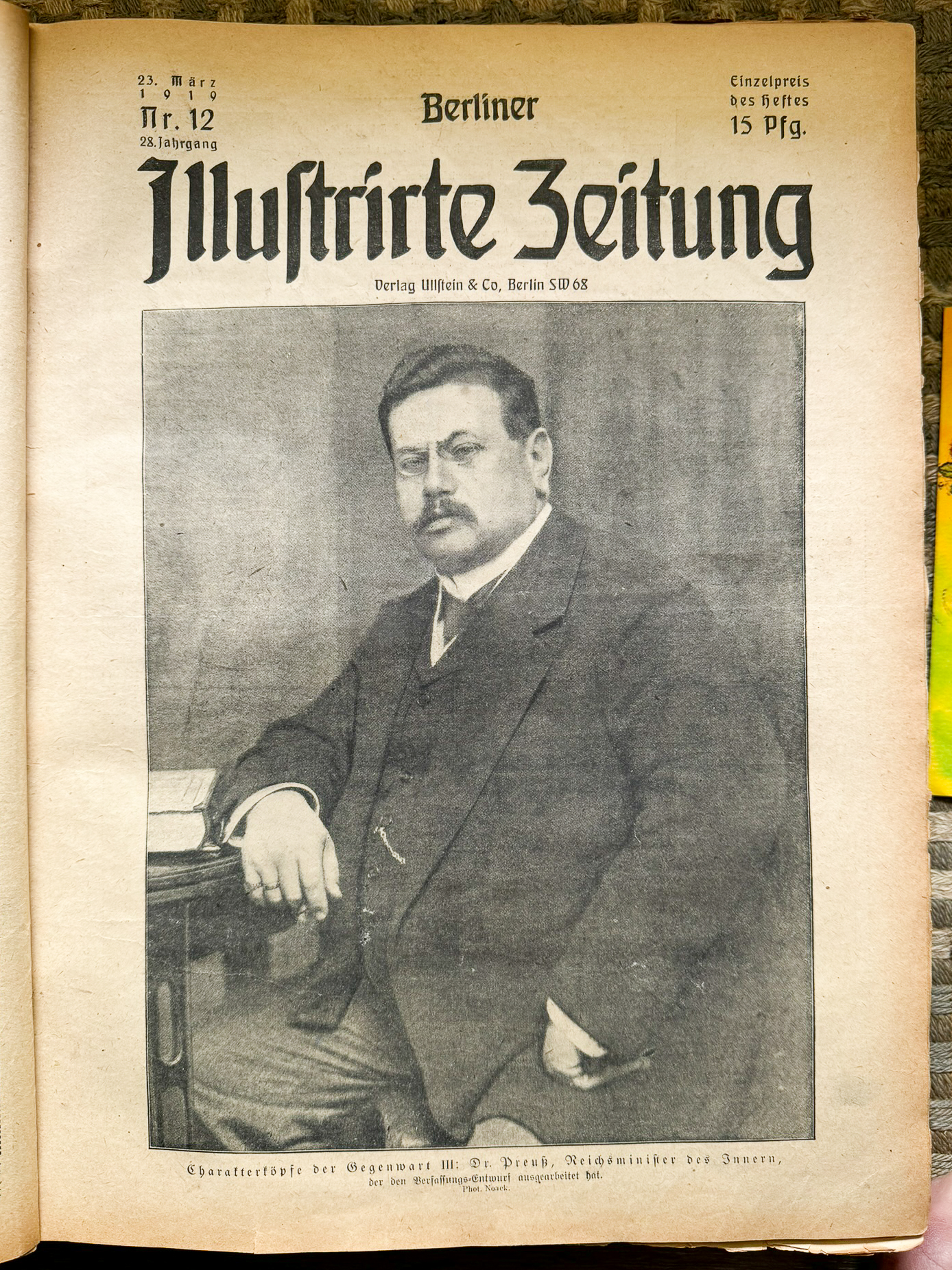
Weimar Interior Minister Hugo Preuß 1919

== Revolution, political career and Weimar Constitution ==
Only a few days after the abdication of Emperor Wilhelm II had been announced during the German Revolution of 1918–19, Preuß, in an article published on 14 November 1918, called on the middle-classes to "accept facts" and cooperate in creating a republic. On 15 November, the head of the revolutionary government, Friedrich Ebert of the Social Democratic Party of Germany (SPD), appointed Preuß state secretary of the Ministry of the Interior. At the time, the revolutionary Council of the People's Deputies co-existed with the old imperial bureaucracy. Although the Council served as the cabinet and made the important decisions, it lacked an administrative apparatus and thus made use of the existing structures. Under the old imperial constitution, the state secretaries had been the heads of the various departments, not true ministers but more senior civil servants working for the chancellor. The Council of the People's Deputies tasked Preuß with preparing a draft for a new republican constitution. In November, he also was a founding member of the German Democratic Party (DDP).

On 13 February 1919, Preuß became Interior Minister in the first elected government of the republic under Minister President Philipp Scheidemann (SPD). Preuß vehemently opposed the Triple Entente's prohibition of the incorporation of German Austria into Germany as a contradiction of the Wilsonian principle of self-determination of peoples. The government resigned on 20 June 1919 in protest against the Treaty of Versailles. It was followed by the government of Gustav Bauer (SPD), who appointed Preuß commissioner for constitutional issues. On 14 August 1919, the Weimar Constitution came into force.

Hugo Preuß' proposal for the reorganization of the different German states into 14 free states

The final version of the constitution naturally was different from his original draft in various ways. Preuß' ideas concerning the reorganisation of the individual territories of the Reich were blocked by the new governments of the Weimar states. He also was unable to put into practice his idea of a very narrow definition of fundamental rights, limited to the classical freedoms, which he wanted to codify in just three articles of the constitution. Moreover, his attempt to change the nature of the second parliamentary chamber (made up of delegates from the individual state governments) proved impossible.

Some parts of the Weimar Constitution (on the role of parliament, government and president) that are considered especially problematic in hindsight were strongly shaped by his ideas. In particular, the powerful position of the head of state, the Reich president, who was given authority to dissolve the Reichstag with no effective limitations and who had considerable emergency powers under Article 48, did not appear to Preuß as a contradiction to the idea of a democratic state. He felt it was a necessary precaution to deal with the danger of a dictatorship of the parliamentary majority and to resolve conflicts between government and parliament by the most democratic method available—through new elections. Preuß also was pessimistic about the ability of the political parties to operate successfully within the new framework: they had no experience in taking on responsibility or making the sorts of compromises required for stable government. Under the Empire, the governments had operated mostly independently of the parties and the Reichstag majority of the day.

== Later life ==
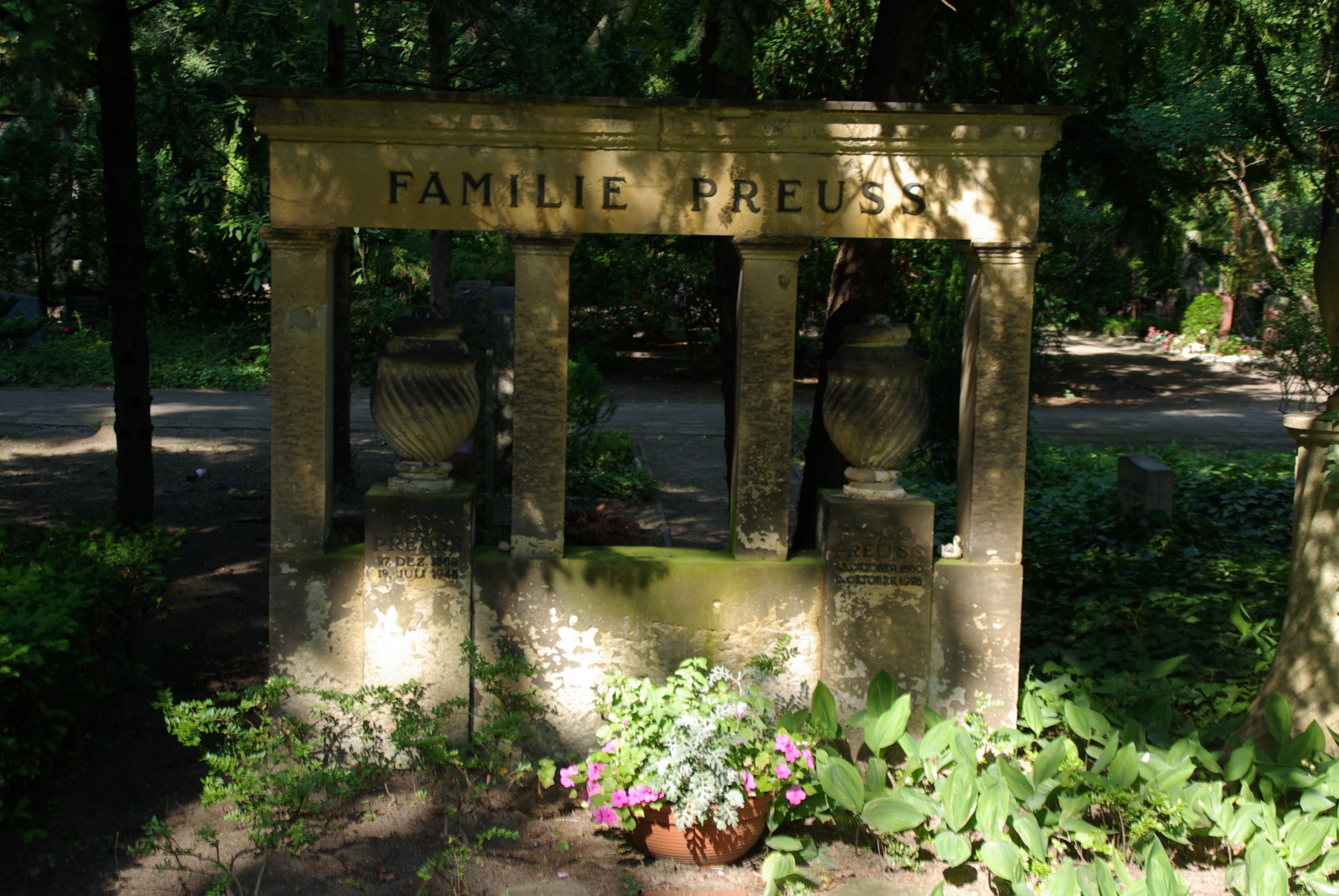
Grave of honour of the Preuß family at the Urnenfriedhof in Berlin-Wedding

From 1919 to 1925 Preuß was a member first of the Prussian Constituent Assembly (1919/20), the equivalent for the Free State of Prussia of the National Assembly, and then the Landtag of Prussia. He published numerous works on legal and constitutional issues as well as pro-republican writings. He was also active in the Reichsbanner Schwarz-Rot-Gold. Hugo Preuß died in Berlin on 9 October 1925. He is buried at the Urnenfriedhof Gerichtsstraße Berlin-Wedding. Since 1952, the grave has been an Ehrengrab (grave of honour) of the city of Berlin.

The Jewish background of the main author of its constitution was one reason why the Weimar Republic was referred to as the "Jews' Republic" by its detractors on the right.

== Works ==
- Franz Lieber, ein Bürger zweier Welten. Habel, Berlin 1886 (Digital version)
- Gemeinde, Staat, Reich, 1889
- Das städtische Amtsrecht in Preußen, 1902
- Die Entwicklung des deutschen Städtewesens. Vol. 1: Entwicklungsgeschichte der deutschen Städteverfassung, 1906
- Stadt und Staat, 1909
- Zur preussischen Verwaltungsreform, 1910
- Das deutsche Volk und die Politik, 1915
- Deutschlands republikanische Reichsverfassung, 1921
- Vom Obrigkeitsstaat zum Volksstaat, 1921
- Um die Weimarer Reichsverfassung, 1924
- Staat, Recht und Freiheit. Aus vierzig Jahren deutscher Politik und Geschichte, 1926 (Collected works, collected by Theodor Heuss)
- Verfassungspolitische Entwicklungen in Deutschland und Westeuropa, ed. by Hedwig Hintze, Berlin 1927
- Reich und Länder. Bruchstücke eines Kommentars zur Verfassung des Deutschen Reiches, ed. by Gerhard Anschütz, Berlin 1928
- Gesammelte Schriften. Im Auftrag der Hugo-Preuß-Gesellschaft e.V. 5 Volumes (4 published so far), ed. by Detlef Lehnert, Tübingen 2007-, Vol. 1: Politik und Gesellschaft im Kaiserreich, 2007; Vol. 2: Öffentliches Recht und Rechtsphilosophie im Kaiserreich, 2009; Vol. 3: Verfassungsentwürfe, Verfassungskommentare, Verfassungtheorie [not yet published]; Vol. 4: Politik und Verfassung in der Weimarer Republik, 2008; Vol. 5: Kommunalwissenschaft und Kommunalpolitik, 2012.

== See also ==
- Carlo Schmid (German politician)
