= Georg Gothein =

German politician (1857–1940)

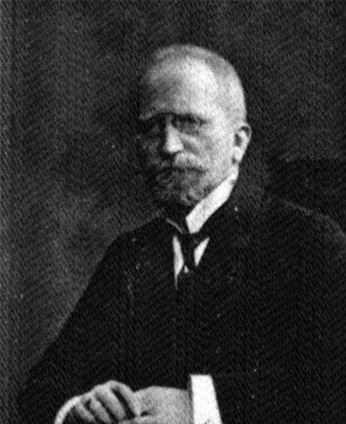

Minister of Treasury
- In office 13 February 1919 – 20 June 1919
- Prime Minister: Philipp Scheidemann

Personal details
- Born: Otto Fürchtegott Georg Gothein; 15 August 1857 Neumarkt in Schlesien, Kingdom of Prussia
- Died: 22 March 1940 (aged 82) Berlin, Nazi Germany
- Resting place: Stahnsdorf South-Western Cemetery
- Party: Progressive People's Party; German Democratic Party

Georg Gothein (15 August 1857 – 22 March 1940) was a left-liberal German politician of Jewish origin. He was a member of the liberal political parties, including Progressive People's Party and German Democratic Party and served as the minister of the treasury between February and June 1919.

== Early life ==
Gothein was born in Neumarkt in Schlesien, Silesia, on 15 August 1857. He hailed from a Jewish family. He received a degree in engineering.

== Career ==
Gothein had various waterway related business activities in Silesia. He was a liberal politician and first became a member of the Progressive People's Party.

From 1889 to 1892, Gothein was a city councilor in Waldenburg (today, Wałbrzych) and, from 1894 to 1906, he held the same position in Breslau (today, Wrocław). From 1904 to 1910, he was a member of the provincial parliament of Silesia and, from 1893 to 1903, a member of the Prussian House of Representatives. Between May 1901 and the collapse of the empire in November 1918, he was a member of the Reichstag, elected for the Greifswald-Grimmen constituency.

Gothein was among the founders of the German Committee for the Promotion of Jewish Settlement in Palestine which was established in April 1918. He was also a member of its central board, and the committee was dissolved in 1919.

Gothein was a cofounder of the German Democratic Party, a liberal political party. He served as minister of the treasury in the cabinet led by Philipp Scheidemann from February to June 1919. He was a member of the Weimar National Assembly (1919–1920) and was elected to the first Reichstag of the Weimar Republic, serving from 1920 to 1924. He was one of the leaders of the Mitteleuropäischer Wirtschaftstagung (German: Central European Economic Union) which had been established in 1928 to promote the economic development in Central Europe. He was active in the organization until 1931 when Tilo von Wilmowsky replaced him in the post.

== Later years, personal life and death ==
After retiring from politics Gothein worked as a journalist. He was a follower of the Protestant church.

Gothein was married and had four daughters. He died in Berlin on 22 March 1940 and was buried at the Stahnsdorf South-Western Cemetery.
