= Otto Landsberg =

German politician (1869–1957)

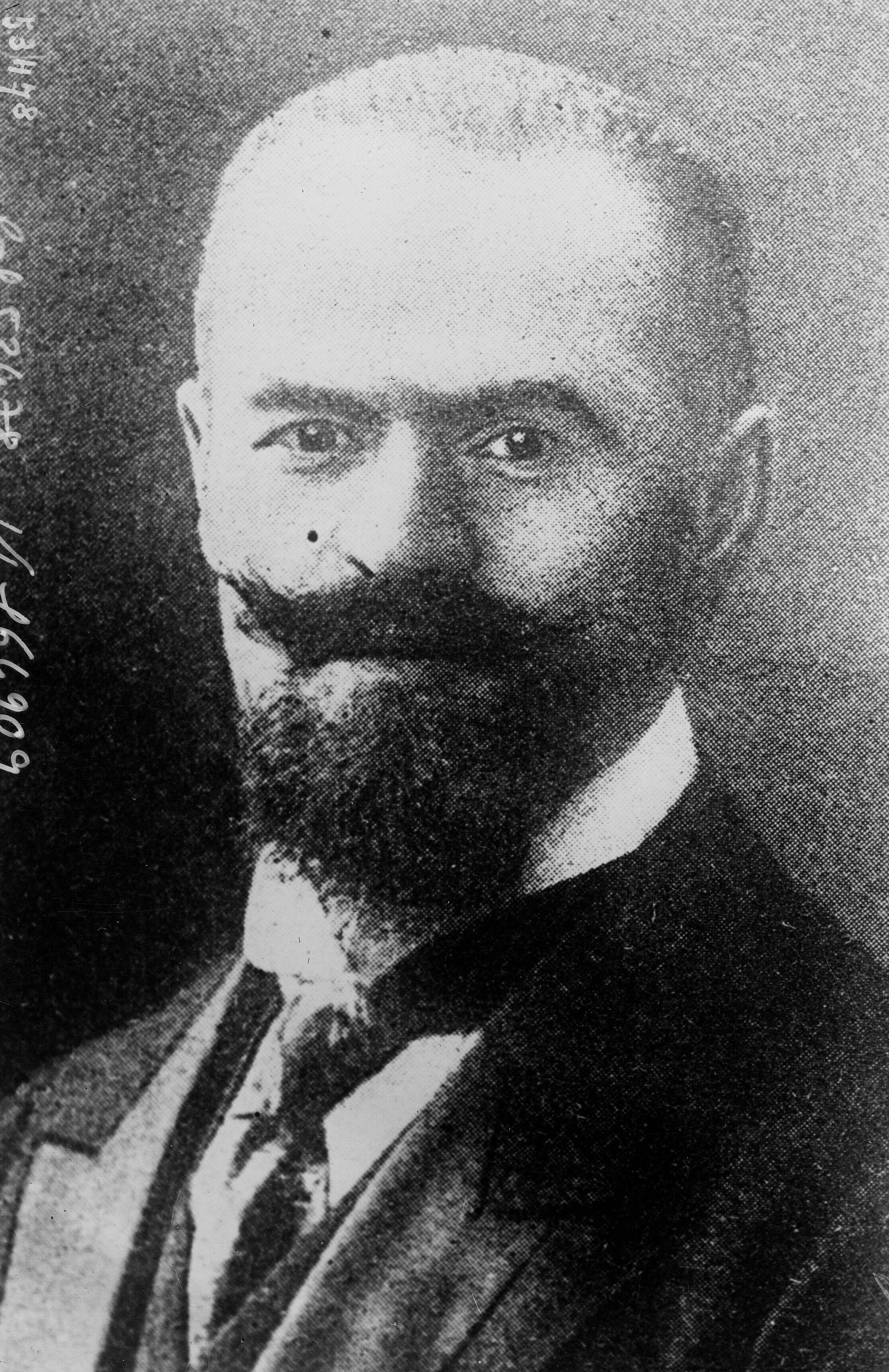
- Landsberg in 1917
- Born: 4 December 1869; Rybnick, Kingdom of Prussia
- Died: 9 December 1957 (aged 88); Baarn, Netherlands

Otto Landsberg (4 December 1869 – 9 December 1957) was a German jurist, politician and diplomat. He was a member of the revolutionary Council of the People's Deputies that took power during the German Revolution of 1918–19 and then served as Minister of Justice in the first democratically-elected government of Germany in 1919. In that capacity, he also was a member of the German delegation that went to Versailles to receive the Allies' Treaty of Versailles.

== Early life ==
Landsberg was born on 4 December 1869 in Rybnick in the Province of Silesia, to a Jewish family. His father was a medical doctor. After passing the Abitur in 1887 in Ostrowo, he moved to Berlin to study law. In 1895, having passed the First (1890) and Second State Examination (1895), he opened a lawyer's office in Magdeburg and made a name for himself as a trial lawyer.

== Political career ==
Having joined the SPD in 1890, Landsberg was a member of the Magdeburg city council from 1903 to 1909. After failing to get elected for Schwarzburg-Sondershausen in 1907, in 1912, Landsberg succeeded in becoming the Reichstag delegate for Magdeburg. Since there were no elections during World War I, he held the seat until 1918.

In May 1912, as a freshman, he refused to leave the chamber with the rest of the SPD for the Kaiserhoch (a cheer for the Emperor) but stood up for it, ignoring party tradition. Landsberg's numerous Reichstag speeches subsequently showed him to be an excellent speaker. During World War I, he supported the policies of the majority of the SPD parliamentary group, opposing Karl Liebknecht and Hugo Haase. After they had left the party fraction in 1916, Landsberg became even more prominent since he was one of only a few jurists remaining. Of a nationalistic bent, he approved of the war loans and argued in favour of the territorial integrity of the Reich, including Alsace-Lorraine, but he opposed German annexion of additional territory. He repeatedly demanded domestic reforms, including democratisation and changes to the election laws of Prussia and the Reich.

On 23 October 1918, Landsberg became a member of the Fraktionsvorstand (leadership of the SPD Reichstag parliamentary group) and became a delegate to the Interfraktioneller Ausschuß where he argued for proportional representation, female suffrage and the democratisation of the Prussian bureaucracy.

From 10 November 1918 to 13 February 1919, he was one of three (later five) SPD members of the Council of the People's Deputies, being responsible for the press, arts and literature. Together with Friedrich Ebert Landsberg fought for parliamentary democracy and a national assembly, opposing a Soviet system and left-wing uprisings. He strongly supported Upper Silesia remaining a part of the Reich.

On 19 January 1919, Landsberg was elected to the Weimar National Assembly for Magdeburg and Anhalt. On 11 February, Landsberg succeeded Paul von Krause as State Secretary of the Reichsjustizamt and on 13 February became Minister of Justice in the government of Philipp Scheidemann.

Landsberg was a member of the German delegation that went to Versailles to receive the Allies' demands in the form of the Treaty of Versailles. He opposed signing the Treaty and resigned over the issue, with the other ministers of the cabinet, on 20 June 1919. He refused to participate in the vote on the Treaty in the National Assembly.

His abilities and experience made Landsberg become first Geschäftsträger (Chargé d'affaires) and then Gesandter (ambassador) of Germany in Belgium. However, he was not very successful in that role, which effectively ended in early 1923, when the Occupation of the Ruhr by French and Belgian troops caused his recall to Berlin. In 1924, he again began practicing law there. He was counsel for his friend Friedrich Ebert in the Reichspräsidentenprozeß (the defamation suit brought by President Ebert) in Magdeburg and in the so-called Dolchstoßprozess (see Dolchstoßlegende) in Munich in 1925, he was a witness rebutting the charges against the Social Democrats.

He was a member of the Reichstag from 1924 to 1933. In that role, he opposed an amnesty for those convicted of Feme murders, expressed regret about the state of political discourse and criticised the bias that made many judges treat right-wing defendants more leniently than left-wing ones.

== Later life and death ==
In 1933, Landsberg emigrated first to Czechoslovakia and Belgium, later to the Netherlands. Friends concealed him during the Nazi occupation of that country. He remained in the Netherlands after the end of the Nazi regime in 1945 and died on 9 December 1957 in Baarn.

Political offices
Preceded by Paul von Krause	Justice Minister of Germany; 1919	Succeeded by Eugen Schiffer
