= Council of the People's Deputies =

Revolutionary German government after World War I

- Cabinet of Weimar Germany

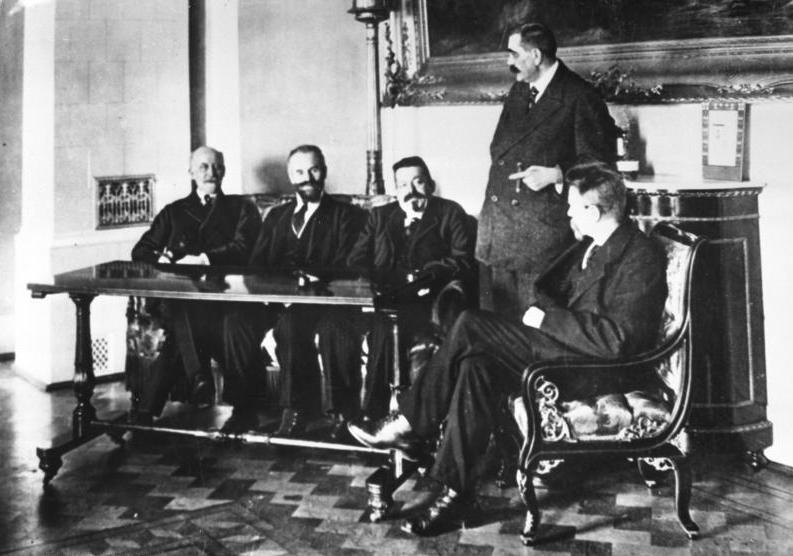
- The Council of the People's Deputies after the USPD pulled out on 29 December 1918 (from left to right): Philipp Scheidemann, Otto Landsberg, Friedrich Ebert, Gustav Noske, Rudolf Wissell
- Date formed: 10 November 1918
- Date dissolved: 13 February 1919 (3 months and 3 days)

People and organisations
- President of Germany: Friedrich Ebert (from 11 February 1919)
- Co-Chairman of the Council of the People's Deputies: Friedrich Ebert; Hugo Haase (until 29 December); Philipp Scheidemann (from 29 December)
- Member party: Social Democrats (SPD); Independent Social Democrats (USPD)

History
- Predecessor: Baden cabinet
- Successor: Scheidemann cabinet

The Council of the People's Deputies (German: Rat der Volksbeauftragten, sometimes translated as "Council of People's Representatives" or "Council of People's Commissars") was the provisional government of Germany during the first part of the German Revolution, from 10 November 1918 to 13 February 1919. Formed initially by three members each from Germany's two main socialist parties, it shaped the transition from the Empire to the Weimar Republic.

The Council took over the functions of head of government (chancellor Friedrich Ebert served as chairman of the Council) and issued decrees in place of legislation (Reichstag). In its first days, it introduced a number of important social reforms, such as the eight-hour workday and universal suffrage, that for the first time gave women the right to vote.

Following the quick and almost bloodless collapse of the political system of the authoritarian Empire, the revolution became violent as it wrestled with the question of whether Germany was to become a soviet republic, as the more radical elements wanted, or a parliamentary democracy. Under Ebert's leadership, the Council defeated the radical Left, but it was at the cost of bloodshed that permanently split Germany's socialists. The Council also found it necessary to keep many right-wing, anti-republican elements in power in the administration, judiciary and military.

The Council scheduled elections to a constituent national assembly in January 1919. The resulting Weimar National Assembly established a democratically legitimised government that replaced the Council of the People's Deputies on 13 February. It then drafted and approved the constitution for the parliamentary Weimar Republic.

== Establishment ==
=== Preconditions: defeat and revolution ===
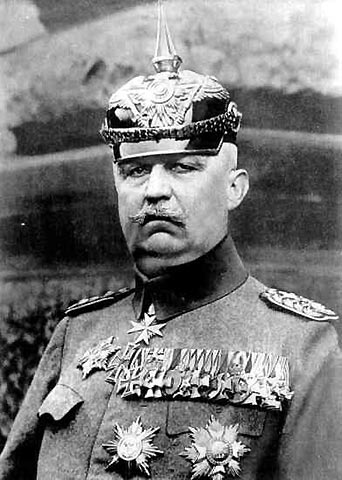
Erich Ludendorff in 1918. He made the initial decision to have the democratic parties in the Empire take the blame for the lost war.

At the end of September 1918 when the German Army was facing inevitable defeat in World War I, the Supreme Army Command (OHL) under Generals Paul von Hindenburg and Erich Ludendorff called on the government to offer a ceasefire to the Entente powers and to amend the German constitution so that the Empire would become a parliamentary monarchy. They hoped that by doing so, Germany's opponents would grant more favourable terms and that they could save the Army and its "honour" by shifting responsibility for the lost war to democratic politicians.

Emperor Wilhelm II appointed the liberal Prince Maximilian von Baden as chancellor. Baden brought members of the Reichstag's majority parties into the government for the first time, initiated the democratisation of the Reich with the October constitutional reforms, which among other changes made the chancellor dependent on the confidence of the Reichstag rather than the emperor, and asked US president Woodrow Wilson to mediate a ceasefire. It was clear from Wilson's reply notes that the Entente powers were willing to negotiate only with a democratic German government and implicitly demanded the Emperor's abdication.

The leadership of the largest party in the Reichstag, the Majority Social Democrats (MSPD), and especially its chairman Friedrich Ebert, saw the party's main goal as already having been achieved by the constitutional reforms and believed that the Empire's elites would come to terms with democratisation if Germany remained a monarchy. Then on 29 October, sailors at Kiel mutinied against orders to sail out for a final battle against the British Navy. They set up workers' and soldiers' councils in Kiel that took control from the military and the civilian government. From Kiel, they spread the German Revolution rapidly across the country, reaching Berlin on 9 November. The leaders of the MSPD feared that the supporters of both the Independent Social Democrats (USPD) and the Marxist Spartacus League were leaning towards Bolshevism. In order to retain the initiative and keep control of the revolutionaries during the rapidly developing events, the MSPD also began to call for the Emperor's abdication.

=== Proclamation of the Republic ===
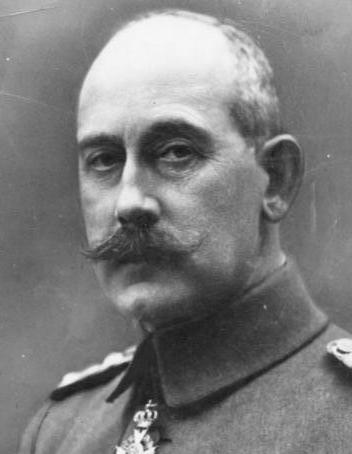
Prince Maximilian von Baden, the last chancellor of the German Empire

On 9 November, the day the revolution reached Berlin, Baden, on his own authority, announced that the Emperor had abdicated and then, without the constitutional authority to do so, handed the chancellorship to Ebert. A few hours later, also acting on his own, Philipp Scheidemann of the MSPD, standing on a balcony of the Reichstag building, declared that Germany was a republic. Ebert planned to quickly "steer the revolution into orderly channels" and published an appeal to the people which he signed as "Reich Chancellor". He spoke of a new (and at that point not yet formed) government that had taken over in order to save the people from civil war and famine. He also invoked the danger of anarchy in order to gain the support of the civil servants, the majority of whom – including the state secretaries (equivalent to ministers) – had chosen to stay in office.

It was of great importance for the MSPD to form a coalition with the USPD in order to maintain its acceptance by the revolutionary workers and soldiers. Although the USPD did not have the masses of workers in Berlin and elsewhere under its control either, the MSPD's position was tenable only in alliance with the USPD. The revolutionary workers' and soldiers' councils that had formed throughout the country following the sailors' uprising were in any case made up primarily of supporters of the MSPD and USPD and wanted unity between the two workers' parties. The moderate wing of the USPD around Hugo Haase was also interested in an alliance because otherwise power in the big cities was in danger of falling to the USPD's left wing around Rosa Luxemburg, Karl Liebknecht and the Spartacists. The two parties differed above all on the question of whether the new government should move forward at once to create the conditions for a socialist reorganization of Germany, such as the immediate nationalisation of large estates and certain key industries, or if it should instead leave such decisions to a constituent national assembly (constitutional convention).

On the evening of the ninth, the MSPD received word that the Berlin workers' and soldiers' council, called together by the Revolutionary Stewards, had decided to elect new councils the next morning and then have them meet in the afternoon to elect a provisional government. In an attempt to put themselves in a position to control the newly elected councils, the MSPD relented on its earlier stand and accepted the USPD's conditions for joining the government. The workers' and soldiers' councils were to be given "political power" and meet "as soon as possible", as called for by the USPD and the Spartacists, but the MSPD was able to avoid the more specific expression "executive, legislative and judicial power" that the other groups had wanted. The MSPD for its part, had to accept that the national assembly would be discussed only "after a consolidation of the conditions created by the revolution".

=== Formation ===
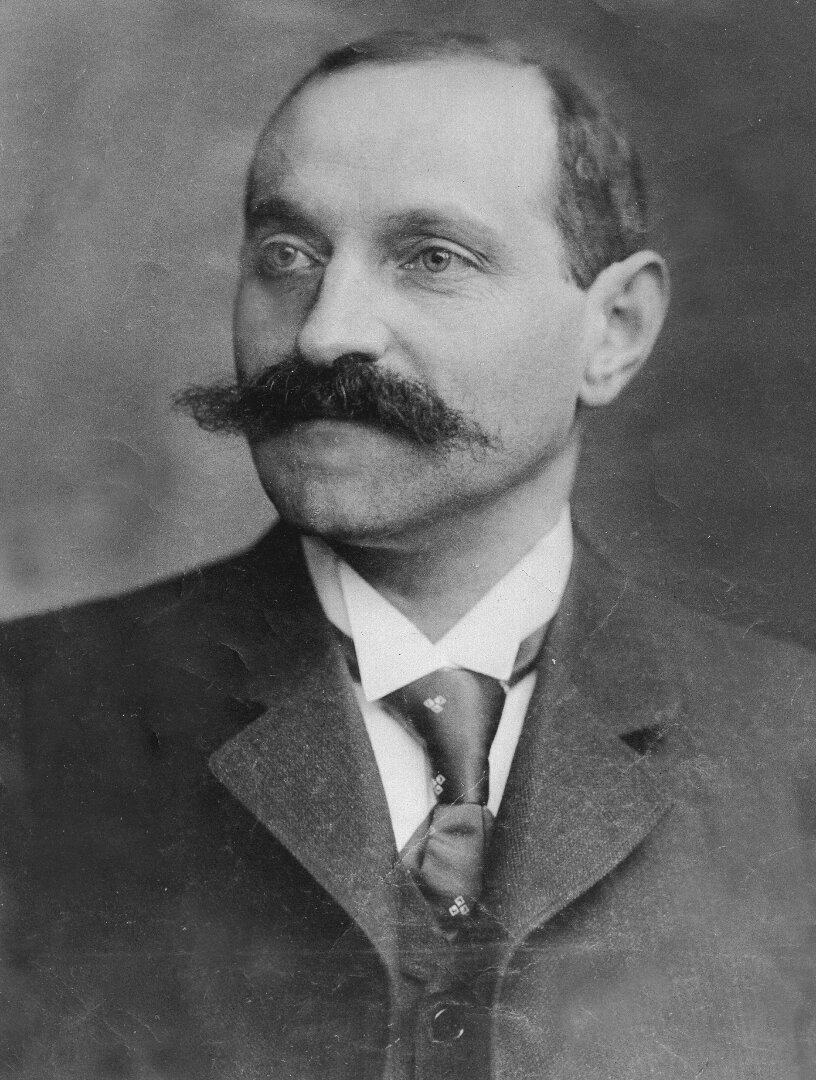
Hugo Haase, the USPD co-chair of the original Council of the People's Deputies

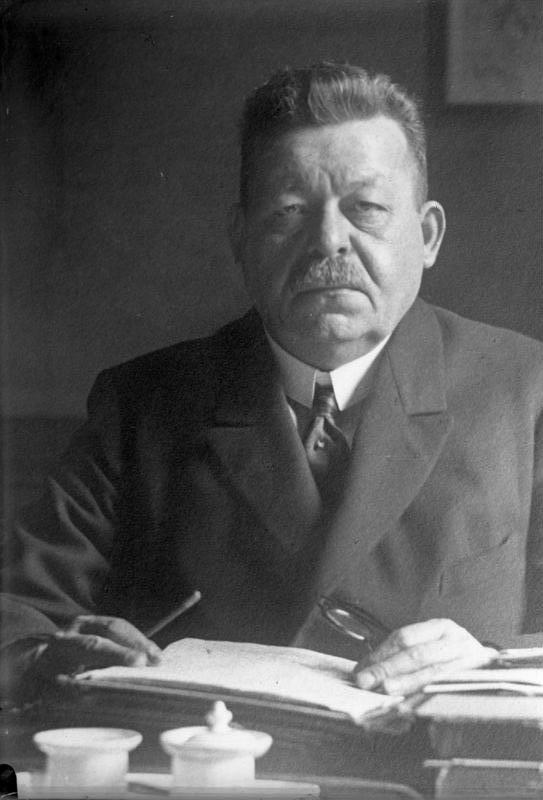
Friedrich Ebert, nominal co-chair with Haase of the Council, but in actuality its leader

The provisional revolutionary government was formed in the late afternoon of 10 November. The USPD originally wanted to call it the "Council of the People's Commissars", but it was established as the "Council of the People's Deputies". The Council consisted of Friedrich Ebert, Philipp Scheidemann and Otto Landsberg from the MSPD, and Hugo Haase, Wilhelm Dittmann and Emil Barth of the USPD. Ebert and Haase were to be equal chairmen. Scheidemann emphasised the equal rights of all members and called the Council of the People's Deputies a "six-man chancellor." Ebert, however, enjoyed special trust among the state secretaries and civil servants because the Emperor's last chancellor had handed the office to him. At times, he continued to use the title of chancellor, which raised him above Haase in the eyes of the Supreme Army Command and the public.

It suited Ebert that the USPD had sent two moderates, Haase and Dittmann, along with a representative of the left wing, Barth, through whom Ebert hoped to be able to win over the radical revolutionaries as well. The "bourgeois ministers" (state secretaries) remained in office as "technical assistants". Each was to be joined by one MSPD and one USPD member as "political undersecretaries of state" to keep watch over them.

== Council movement to National Assembly ==
=== People's Deputies and the council movement ===
On 10 November 1918, the three thousand delegates of the workers' and soldiers' councils who had been elected earlier in the day met at the Circus Busch auditorium in Berlin. Contrary to the expectations of the Independents, the MSPD dominated the meeting as a result of its extensive party organisation and ability to mobilise the unions. Together with the right wing of the USPD, it constituted the majority in the Council Assembly, which readily confirmed the membership of the Council of the People's Deputies. The approval of the councils at the Assembly was critical in that it gave the deputies the credibility they needed to function effectively.

The Assembly also set up the Executive Council of Workers' and Soldiers' Councils of Greater Berlin under the leadership of Richard Müller, the head of the Revolutionary Stewards. It consisted of 14 representatives each from the workers and soldiers. The workers' representatives came equally from the MSPD and USPD, while the soldiers' representatives were mostly politically independent. Although it was intended to monitor the Council of the People's Deputies, the latter in fact controlled the overall council organisation through the Greater Berlin Executive Council rather than the other way around. The Council of the People's Deputies was able to take the dominant position because it was made up of the important party leaders, and the effective power lay with them. In the words of legal historian Ernst Rudolf Huber, "The party-political parity in the Executive Council as well as in the Council of the People's Deputies was a clear indication that it was not the "council state" but the party state that prevailed in the revolution. The council organisation remained a mere tool for establishing the rule of the two socialist parties".

The basic configuration did not change in the following weeks and months. To the disappointment of the radical Left, the council organisation did not develop into a body that took the road to a council state and a dictatorship of the proletariat. The Reich Congress of Workers' and Soldiers' Councils, which met in Berlin from 16 to 21 December and was also dominated by the MSPD, was in favour of having Germany's future determined by a national assembly. A council state with constant monitoring of the elected representatives by the masses was something the majority of workers did not want, and the election of a national assembly met with approval from all social classes. The Reich Congress also passed a resolution on the military called the Hamburg Points, which contained revolutionary demands that were strongly opposed by the military. Supreme command was to be with the Council of the People's Deputies, disciplinary authority was to reside with the soldiers' councils, officers were to be elected and there were to be no rank insignia and no requirement to salute officers when off-duty. The demands were never implemented.

On 18 December 1918, the Council decided in principle to socialise "suitable" industries. No concrete steps were taken to accomplish it, however, since the MSPD members were not eager to enact any initiatives that were likely to further disrupt the strained food supply or negatively affect industrial productivity. The Council had its hands full with demobilising and reintegrating eight million soldiers, withdrawing three million of them across the Rhine and ensuring a sufficient supply of coal and food to last the winter. There were also threats to the Reich's integrity from separatist movements in the Rhineland and from Polish territorial expansion.

Late in December, members of the People's Navy Division (Volksmarinedivision), which had been formed to protect the revolutionary government in Berlin, rose over the issue of back pay owed to them. After the Ebert government used military force against them during the 1918 Christmas crisis, the USPD accused Ebert, Scheidemann and Landsberg of betraying the revolution and supporting the old, anti-revolutionary forces. The USPD members resigned from the Council of the People's Deputies on 29 December and were replaced by two additional representatives of the MSPD, Gustav Noske and Rudolf Wissell.

=== Members of the Council ===
Member			Term of Office		Political party	Position / Portfolios
#	Portrait	Name	Took office	Left office	Political party	Position / Portfolios
	Friedrich Ebert	Friedrich Ebert (1871–1925)	10 November 1918	13 February 1919	MSPD	Co-Chairman; Reich Chancellor until 13 February 1919; Interior, Military
	Hugo Haase	Hugo Haase (1863–1919)	10 November 1918	29 December 1918 (Resigned)	USPD	Co-Chairman; Foreign Affairs, Colonies, Justice
	Philipp Scheidemann	Philipp Scheidemann (1865–1939)	10 November 1918	11 February 1919	MSPD	Co-Chairman from 29 December 1919; Minister President from 13 February 1919; Finance
	Otto Landsberg	Otto Landsberg (1896–1957)	10 November 1918	11 February 1919	MSPD	Finance, Press
	Wilhelm Dittmann	Wilhelm Dittmann (1874–1954)	10 November 1918	29 December 1918 (Resigned)	USPD	Demobilisation, Transportation
	Emil Barth	Emil Barth (1879–1941)	10 November 1918	29 December 1918 (Resigned)	USPD	Social Policy
	Gustav Noske	Gustav Noske (1868–1946)	29 December 1918	11 February 1919	MSPD	Demobilisation, Army, Navy
	Rudolf Wissell	Rudolf Wissell (1869–1962)	29 December 1918	11 February 1919	MSPD	Social Policy

=== Ties to imperial systems ===
Historian Heinrich August Winkler noted that "a good degree of democracy" had been achieved before 9 November 1918. Universal suffrage for men had been in place since 1871, and parliamentary government had been introduced in October. The political system of the authoritarian state had collapsed in November 1918, with only a minority still standing behind it. The monarchists and army command resisted the change of regime, which meant that the revolution could not retain the old state institutions without danger to the new system.

In spite of the revolution, the administration continued to function, the judiciary and education systems had scarcely been touched, and after the Ebert–Groener Pact of 10 November, the Supreme Army Command and the Council of the People's Deputies were in tacit agreement to support each other. On the other hand, the MSPD and USPD had differing ideas about how Germany should develop and were under great time pressure to act. When the two parties formed their alliance, the Council chose to govern outside the imperial constitution. It instructed the Reichstag not to reconvene and decreed that the existing Federal Council of the states (Bundesrat) should exercise only its administrative functions, not its legislative powers.

As a result, none of the top executive or legislative bodies of the Empire remained in power. The state secretaries, who under the imperial constitution had been subject to the chancellor's instructions, became independent heads of their departments, in effect ministers in the modern sense. The government, which was controlled by the Council, exercised the former roles of the emperor, chancellor, Bundesrat and Reichstag. The Council began working according to rules of procedure on 12 November. The rules prohibited unauthorised intervention in the administration by individual members of the Council. Its instructions to the state secretaries had to be issued collectively and only as guidelines, not for individual cases.

=== Actions ===
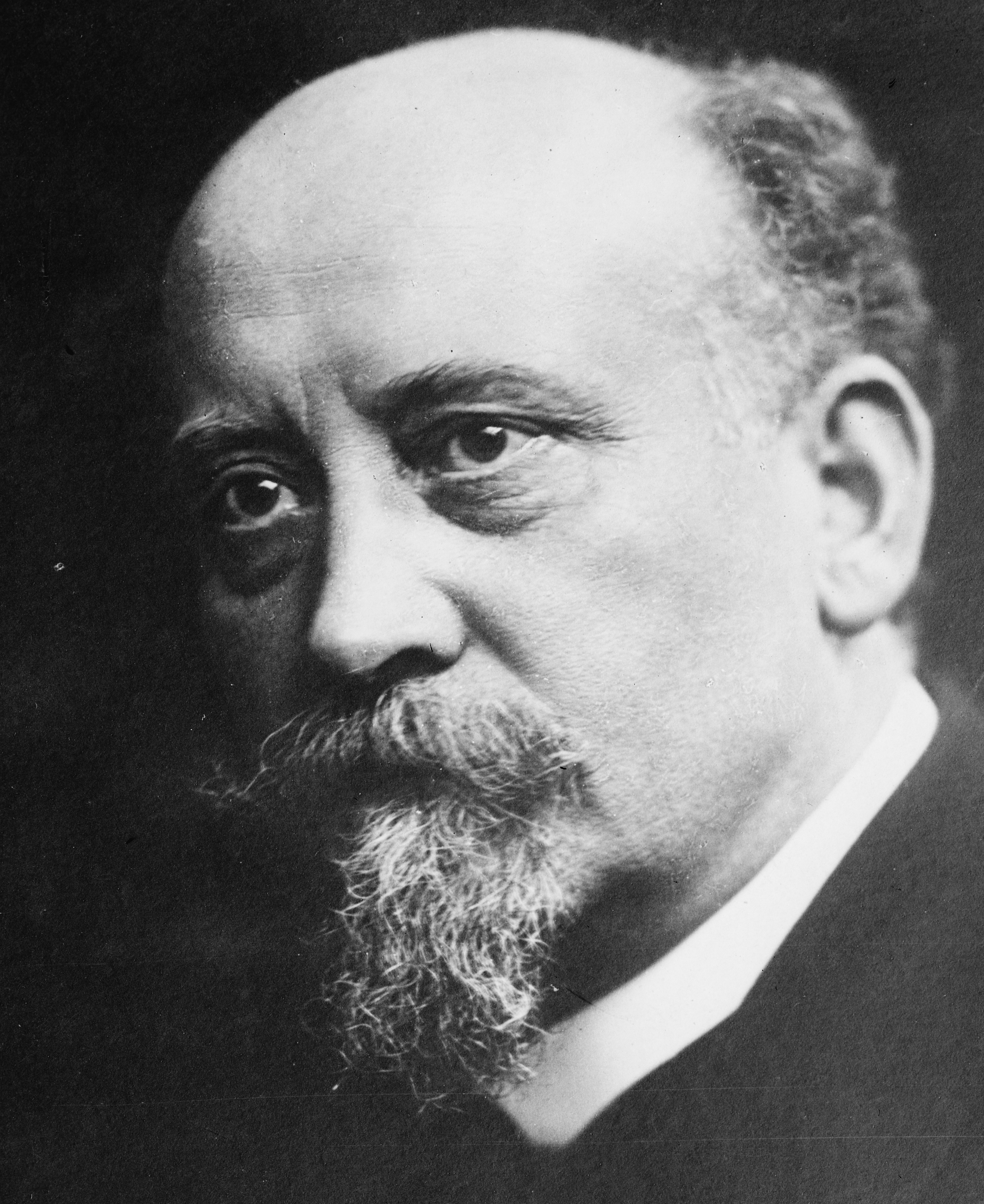
Philipp Scheidemann, minister president of Germany during the period of the Weimar National Assembly

On 10 November 1918, just hours before the Council of the People's Deputies was formed, the cabinet of Chancellor Ebert approved the Armistice of Compiègne, which came into force the following day and ended World War I. The Council then had to deal with the consequences of the agreement, including the handover of Alsace–Lorraine, the withdrawal of the German military from all French and Belgian territories and the German region west of the Rhine, plus the surrender of the fleet and other war equipment to the World War I Allies.

On 12 November, two days after it had convened for the first time, the Council issued an appeal "To the German People". The following points of the "socialist programme" immediately went into effect:

- The state of siege was lifted;
- The right of association and assembly was no longer subject to any restrictions, including for civil servants and state workers;
- Censorship, including that of the theatre, was abolished;
- Expression of opinion in speech and writing was made free;
- Freedom of worship was guaranteed;
- Amnesty was granted for all political offences. Pending proceedings for such offences were dismissed;
- The wartime Auxiliary Services Act was repealed, with the exception of the provisions relating to the settlement of disputes;
- Servants' regulations were repealed, as were the exceptional laws against agricultural labourers;
- The labour protection provisions repealed at the beginning of the war were reinstated.

In the same document, the Council also promised to introduce the eight-hour workday and other social and political reforms by 1 January 1919. They included the creation of jobs, unemployment assistance that would distribute the burden between Reich, state and municipality, a raise in the earnings ceiling for health insurance, more housing to relieve the shortage, a better food supply, the continuance of orderly production, the protection of property against private infringement and the safeguarding of personal freedom and safety. Future elections, including that for the constituent assembly, were to be held under a franchise that would be equal, secret, direct and universal, based on proportional representation and open to all men and women aged 20 and above. The decree on elections was issued on 30 November.

Over the next two months, the Council issued a large number of decrees, some of which formalised points made in "To the German People". On the same day it was announced, a decree established the Reich Office for Economic Demobilisation, with the purpose of carrying the German economy over "to peace conditions". On 22 November, a regulation was issued by the Reich Food Office for election to "peasants' and workers' councils" which were subscribed to "by all agricultural associations". On 23 November, the Reich Office for Economic Demobilisation issued twelve regulations which set forth rules governing duration of the working day, sick leaves, paid vacations, "and other aspects of labour relations within the German economy". A decree of the Office for Economic Demobilisation made on 9 December provided that the state governments "should require the communes and communal unions to establish departments for general vocational guidance and for placement of apprentices".

In December, the income limit for entitlement to health insurance coverage was raised from 2,500 to 5,000 marks. Protections for homeworkers were improved and housing provision was increased. A decree of 23 December regulated wage agreements, laying down that a wage agreement that had been concluded in any branch of employment between the competent trade union authority and the competent employers' authority had absolute validity, meaning that no employer could enter into any other agreement of his own initiative. In addition, arbitral courts were set up to decide all disputes. A decree of 4 January 1919 compelled employers to reinstate their former labourers on demobilisation, while measures were devised to safeguard workers from arbitrary dismissal. Workers who felt that they had been treated unfairly could appeal to an arbitration court, and in case of necessity, the demobilisation authorities "had the power to determine who should be dismissed and who should be retained in employment". On 29 November 1918, the denial of voting rights to welfare recipients was repealed.

A government proclamation of December 1918 ordered farmers to re-employ returning soldiers "at their former working place and to provide work for the unemployed", while an important decree was issued that same month in support of youth welfare. In December, the government provisionally granted the continuation of a maternity allowance introduced during the Great War, while a decree issued in January mandated the employment of disabled veterans. A Settlement Decree was issued by the government on 29 January "concerning the acquisition of land for the settlement of workers on the land" that foresaw "the possibility of expropriating estates over 100 hectares to facilitate settlement". However, only just over 500,000 hectares were freed by 1928, benefiting 2.4% of the farming population.

In addition, Ebert's government got food supplies moving again and issued various decrees related to the promotion of civil aviation and restrictions on firearm possession.

The Council did not tackle fundamental reforms in the military. Before the Council's formation, Ebert had promised the new head of the OHL, General Wilhelm Groener, that military command would remain with the professional officer corps (see Ebert–Groener pact). In return, the army command promised to support the new republican government.

The general elections to the Weimar National Assembly took place on 19 January 1919. On 10 February, it passed the Reich Law on Provisional Power, a kind of interim constitution, which stated in its first article that "The constituent German National Assembly has the task of adopting the future Reich constitution as well as other urgent Reich laws." In accordance with the Reich Law, the National Assembly was to elect the interim Reich president, and it chose Friedrich Ebert on 11 February. He, in turn, selected Philipp Scheidemann to form a government. The Scheidemann cabinet, which was a coalition of three centre-left parties because the SPD had won only 38% of the votes, was introduced on 13 February. Germany then had both a parliament and a government that were democratically legitimised, and the Council of the People's Deputies was dissolved. The Assembly went on to draft and approve the Weimar constitution, which established Germany as a parliamentary republic on 14 August 1919.

== Evaluation ==
There has been considerable discussion about whether the Council of the People's Deputies could have acted more courageously and whether the important transitional phase could have been used to bring about more far-reaching changes in state and society. Its co-operation with the civil service and the military was unavoidable, but the regime could have built up its own troops, which would have been loyal to the Republic. The Social Democrats around Ebert later insisted that they lacked the necessary expertise to replace civil servants on a large scale. The MSPD's fundamental belief in democracy also did not allow it to make decisions about Germany's future form of government on its own or as representative of the working classes only. It needed the legitimisation of a democratically elected body such as the National Assembly before it was willing to make substantial changes.
