= German workers' and soldiers' councils of 1918–1919 =

Soviet-style councils of the 1918/19 German revolution

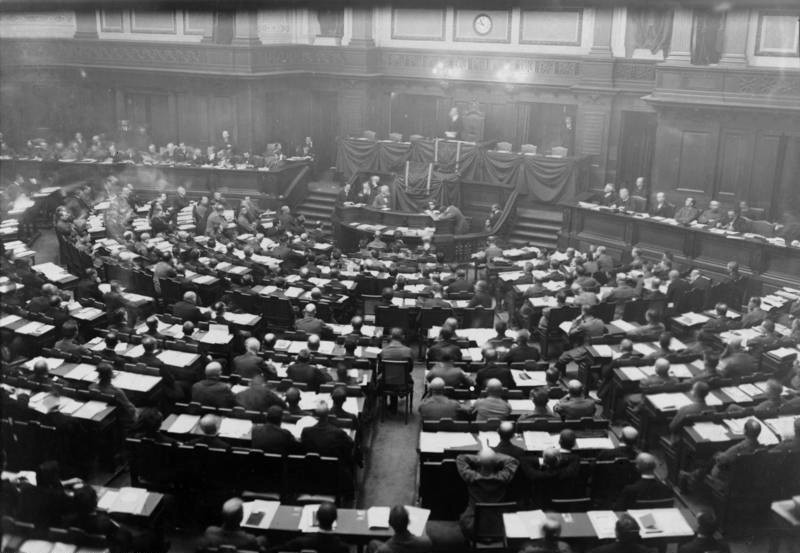
The Reich Congress of Workers' and Soldiers' Councils meeting in Berlin on 16 December 1918

The German workers' and soldiers' councils of 1918–1919 (German: Deutsche Arbeiter- und Soldatenräte) were short-lived revolutionary bodies that carried the German revolution to cities across the German Empire during the final days of World War I. Meeting little to no resistance, they formed quickly, took over city governments and key buildings and caused most of the locally stationed military to flee or stand down. In the face of the revolution being spread by the councils, all of Germany's ruling monarchs, including Emperor Wilhelm II, abdicated by the end of November 1918.

Many of the councils, including the major ones in Berlin, were divided between those on the radical Left who wanted to set up a system of soviet democracy and moderates whose goal was to establish a socialist-dominated parliamentary republic. Germany's interim national revolutionary government, the Council of the People's Deputies, was initially split equally between the radical Independent Social Democratic Party (USPD) and the moderate Social Democratic Party (SPD). During the two large gatherings of workers' and soldiers' councils in Berlin, the voting generally followed the wishes of the SPD leadership. Crucially, and against the will of the far left, they were able to schedule an election for a national assembly that would allow all Germans, not just workers and soldiers, to determine the country's future form of government.

In the early months of 1919, there were a number of violent revolts by workers who wanted to carry the revolution forward to create a soviet democracy. The government in Berlin, at that point no longer with any USPD members, called on the army and the paramilitary Freikorps to suppress the uprisings, and there was considerable loss of life. The workers' and soldiers' councils in Berlin began turning their powers over to the newly elected Weimar National Assembly in early February. The remaining local councils gradually disbanded in the months following the formal establishment of the Weimar Republic on 14 August 1919.

== First councils ==
The straitened living conditions of German workers during World War I increased the appeal of radical left political parties such as the Independent Social Democrats (USPD). It facilitated the creation of workers' councils which promoted strikes and other popular agitation. The 1916 Auxiliary Services Act, which allowed workers employed in companies with more than 50 people to create committees to negotiate wages and working conditions, helped fuel their growth. Representatives from the committees and other formal and informal workers' groups joined the USPD-backed workers councils throughout Germany. The USPD and its left wing, the Spartacus League, were responsible for calling the massive but unsuccessful nationwide anti-war strike of January 1918.

=== Kiel sailors' uprising ===
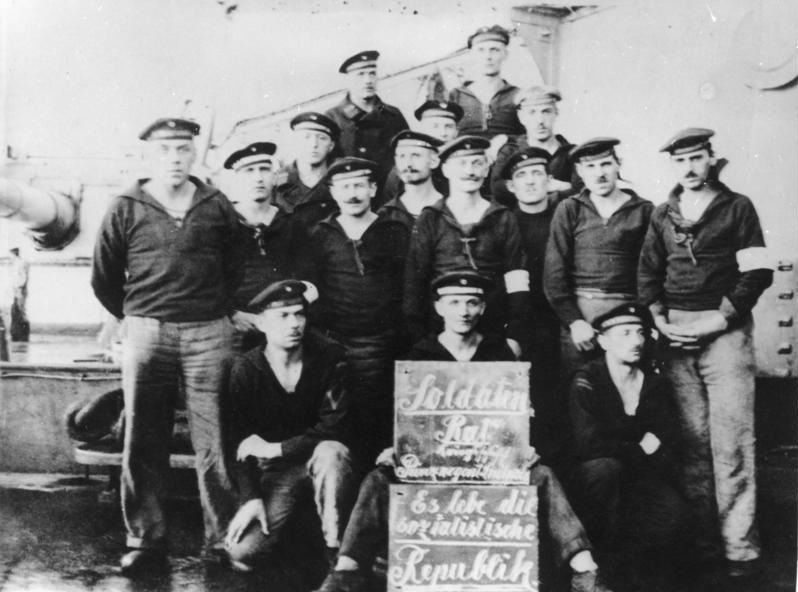
The soldiers' council of the battleship Prinzregent Luitpold in November 1918. The sign reads, "Soldiers' council Prinzregent Luitpold. Long live the socialist republic."

The first revolutionary workers' and soldiers' council grew out of the sailors' revolt at Kiel that began after it had become clear that Germany would lose the war. On 3 November 1918, sailors, soldiers and workers in Kiel marched in protest against the arrest of sailors who had refused orders to prepare for a final battle against the British Grand Fleet. After a military patrol shot seven protestors, an armed uprising broke out. The insurgents brought public and military institutions in the city under their control, and on 4 November representatives of the sailors formed a council and issued a list of demands focused mostly on loosening military discipline. Revolutionary sailors spread out from Kiel in the following days, reaching Bremen and Hamburg on the sixth, Hanover and Cologne on the seventh, and all major cities except in the far eastern states of Germany by the eighth. Everywhere they went, workers and soldiers joined them and set up councils similar to the one in Kiel, although with demands that increasingly centered on the abdication of Emperor Wilhelm II and a democratic reformation of the German Empire. Soldiers by simple acclamation often elected their most respected comrades; workers generally chose members of the local executive committees of Germany's two main socialist parties, the Majority Social Democrats (generally referred to simply as the SPD) and the more radical USPD.

There was little to no resistance to the establishment of the councils. Often with the support of local citizens, they freed political prisoners and occupied city halls, military facilities and train stations. The military authorities surrendered or fled, and civic officials accepted that they were under the control of the councils rather than the military and carried on with their work. Little changed in the factories except for the removal of the military discipline that had prevailed during the war. Private property was not touched. Princes and royals abdicated in the face of the revolution. All, including Emperor Wilhelm II, were gone without bloodshed by the end of November.

=== Berlin ===
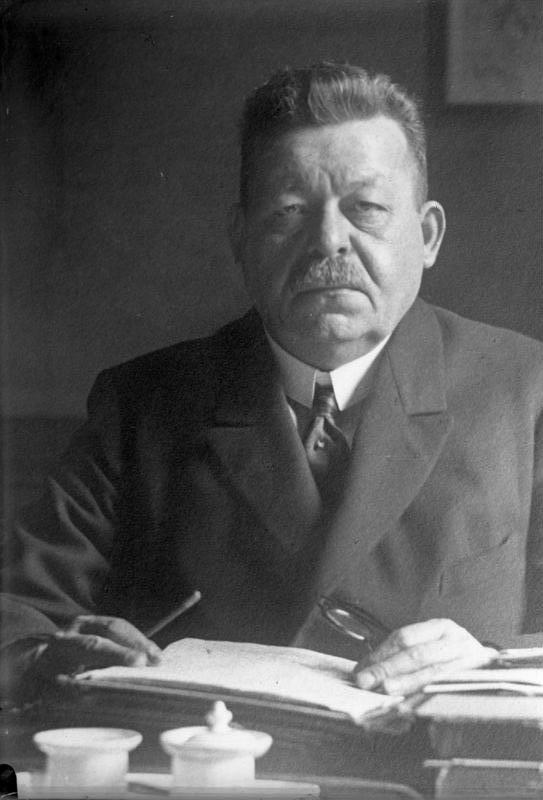
Friedrich Ebert, the SPD leader who effectively controlled the Council of the People's Deputies

The revolution reached Berlin on Saturday 9 November. The Revolutionary Stewards and the Spartacus League – groups that favoured a soviet democracy run by workers' councils – called a general strike with the backing of the SPD. Workers and soldiers established councils and occupied important buildings such as the police headquarters. A massive demonstration march through the city drew a large number of soldiers from their barracks. Many of the demonstrators carried placards calling for an end to the war and the authoritarian monarchical state. The SPD formed its own workers' and soldiers' council consisting of twelve factory representatives and the party leaders Friedrich Ebert, Otto Braun and Otto Wels. At midday, Reich Chancellor Max von Baden prematurely announced the abdication of the Emperor and, in formal breach of the Imperial Constitution, handed the chancellorship to Ebert. In the afternoon, Philipp Scheidemann of the SPD proclaimed a republic from the Reichstag building, while a few hours later Karl Liebknecht of the Spartacus League proclaimed the "Free Socialist Republic of Germany" at the Berlin Palace.

== Council vs. parliamentary republic ==
In an initial written exchange of ideas on 9 and 10 November about the future form of the government, the USPD stated that it would take part only if political power was in the hands of the workers' and soldiers' councils. The SPD, which wanted a national assembly to determine the type of government, responded negatively: "If this request means the dictatorship of a section of a class that is not backed by the majority of the people, then we must reject the demand because it contradicts our democratic principles." The Spartacists declared that they wanted to abolish the Reichstag, all state parliaments and the existing Reich government; have the Berlin workers' and soldiers' council take over the government until the establishment of a Reich workers' and soldiers' council; elect workers' and soldiers' councils throughout Germany that would have full legislative and administrative authority; have the workers' and soldiers' councils take over all military and civilian authorities and command posts, all weapons and ammunition stocks, as well as all armaments factories; and to control all means of transport.

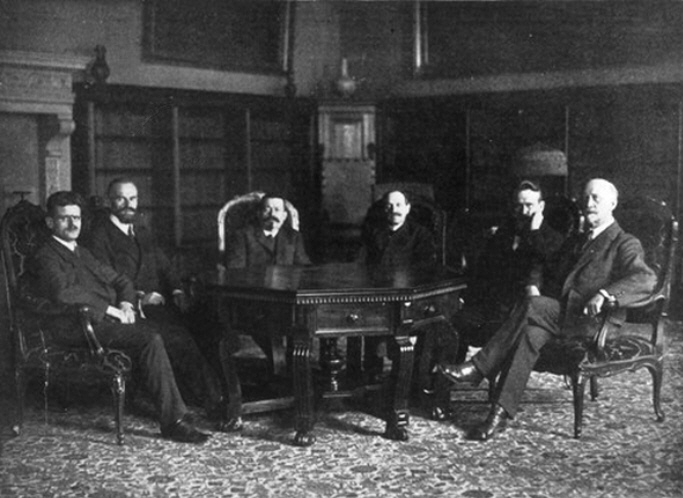
The Council of the People's Deputies. From left to right: Barth, Landsberg, Ebert, Haase, Dittmann, Scheidemann

On the evening of the ninth, the Berlin workers' and soldiers' council, called together by the Revolutionary Stewards, decided to elect new councils the next morning and then to have them meet in the afternoon to elect a provisional government. In an attempt to put themselves in a position to control the newly elected councils, the SPD relented on its earlier stand and accepted the USPD's conditions for joining the government: the councils were to have political power, and a constitutional convention would be discussed only after the revolution was consolidated. Out of the agreement came the six-member Council of the People's Deputies (Rat der Volksbeauftragten) – the name was adopted at the insistence of the USPD – with three representatives from each party: Ebert, Scheidemann and Otto Landsberg for the SPD and Hugo Haase, Wilhelm Dittmann and Emil Barth for the USPD. Ebert and Haase were the co-chairmen. The Council of the People's Deputies was to derive its sovereignty from the workers' and soldiers' councils.

=== Circus Busch meeting ===
In a rapidly executed plan to prepare the SPD for the new council elections, Otto Wels used the existing SPD party apparatus to bring the majority of the soldiers in Berlin over to the side of the SPD. He swore the 148 elected soldiers' representatives to the SPD platform, which called for equal representation of the SPD and USPD in the new government. In its 10 November edition, the party newspaper Vorwärts carried the same message of unity to the workers with the headline "No Civil War!" The SPD's efforts gave them enough support to feel confident that at the afternoon's meeting they would have a majority of the delegates behind them and the Council of the People's Deputies.

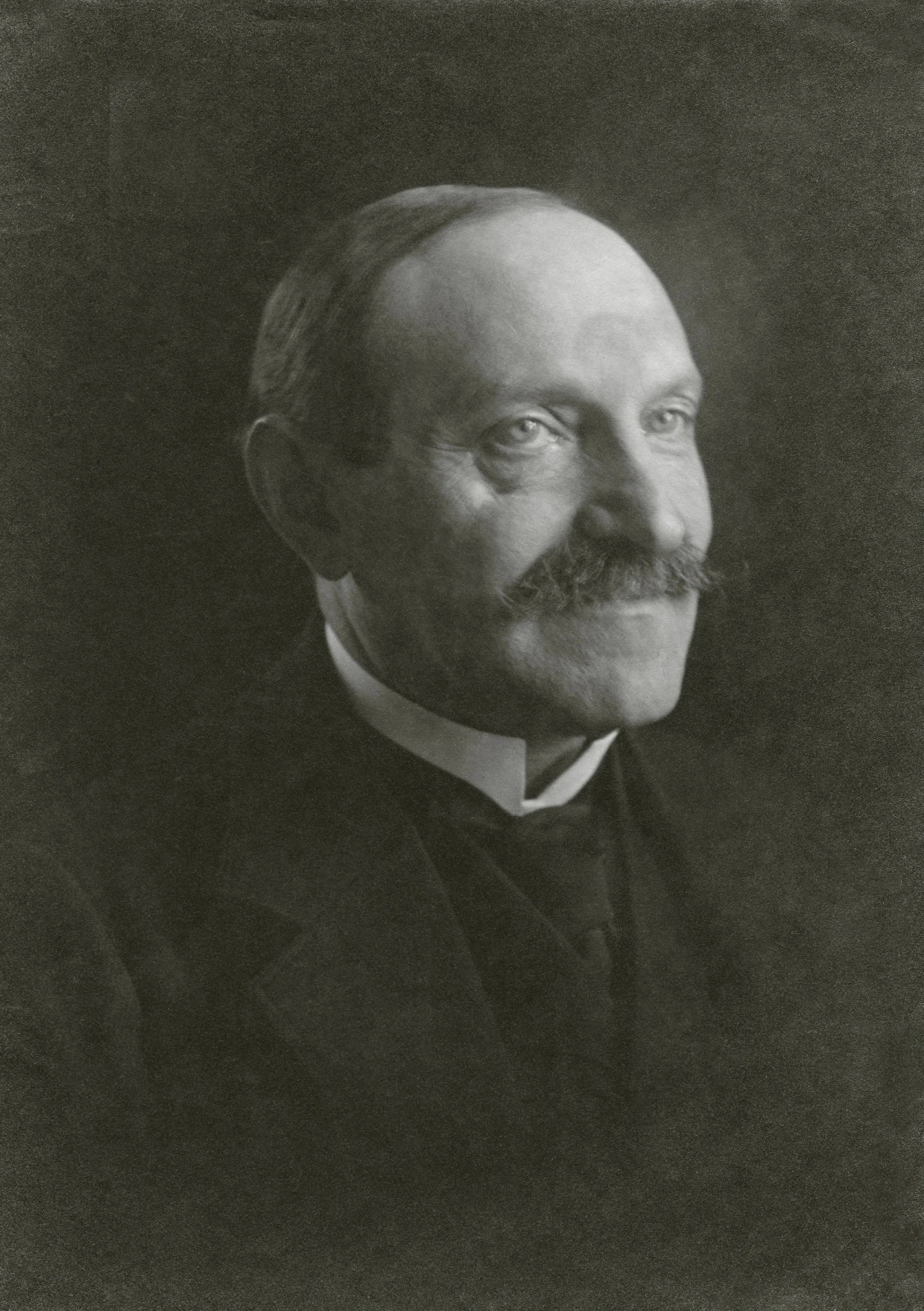
Hugo Haase, the USPD co-chair of the Council of the People's Deputies

About 3,000 workers and soldiers gathered at Berlin's Circus Busch auditorium. A clear majority approved the six-member Council of the People's Deputies named earlier in the day. Emil Barth of the USPD, in a move that caught the SPD by surprise, then called for an action committee to oversee the Council and presented a list of radical leftists drawn up by the Revolutionary Stewards. Ebert thought the committee unnecessary and said that if it was established, it needed to have equal numbers of SPD and USPD members. When members of the Spartacus League threatened Ebert, he went for safety to the Reich Chancellery where he received the assurances of Prussian Minister of War Heinrich Schëuch that the Council of the People's Deputies would be protected.

At the Circus Busch, the Revolutionary Stewards backed down under pressure from both Hugo Haase (USPD) and the soldiers' representatives. The assembly then elected two 14-member action committees, one made up of seven members each from the SPD and USPD, and the other of soldiers, most of whom were politically independent. The two committees together formed the Executive Council of Workers' and Soldiers' Councils of Greater Berlin (Vollzugsrat des Arbeiter- und Soldatenrates Grossberlin) under the leadership of Richard Müller, the head of the Revolutionary Stewards.

The workers' and soldiers' councils saw themselves as a provisional parliament to express the revolutionary will of the people. The goals they set were to be politically implemented by the Council of People's Deputies under the supervision of the Executive Council of Greater Berlin. Their program stated that:

The bearers of political power are now workers' and soldiers' councils. Immediate peace is the slogan of the revolution. The rapid and consistent socialisation of the capitalist means of production is feasible without major upheaval, given Germany's social structure and the degree of maturity of its economic and political organisation. It is necessary in order to build a new economic order out of the blood-soaked ruins, to prevent the economic enslavement of the masses and the destruction of culture.

=== SPD dominance ===
In its commitment to democracy, the SPD thought that the "revolutionary mandate" of the spontaneously elected workers' and soldiers' councils should not be used in advance of a national assembly. In Ebert's words, the Council of the People's Deputies was simply the "bankruptcy trustee" of the Empire. Decisions on whether the government should be a council system or a parliamentary democracy and whether industries should be nationalised were to be made only after the people voted. The USPD members of the Council, on the other hand, wanted to wait until the revolution had been consolidated and then, in a manner to be determined later, link the councils to a national assembly.

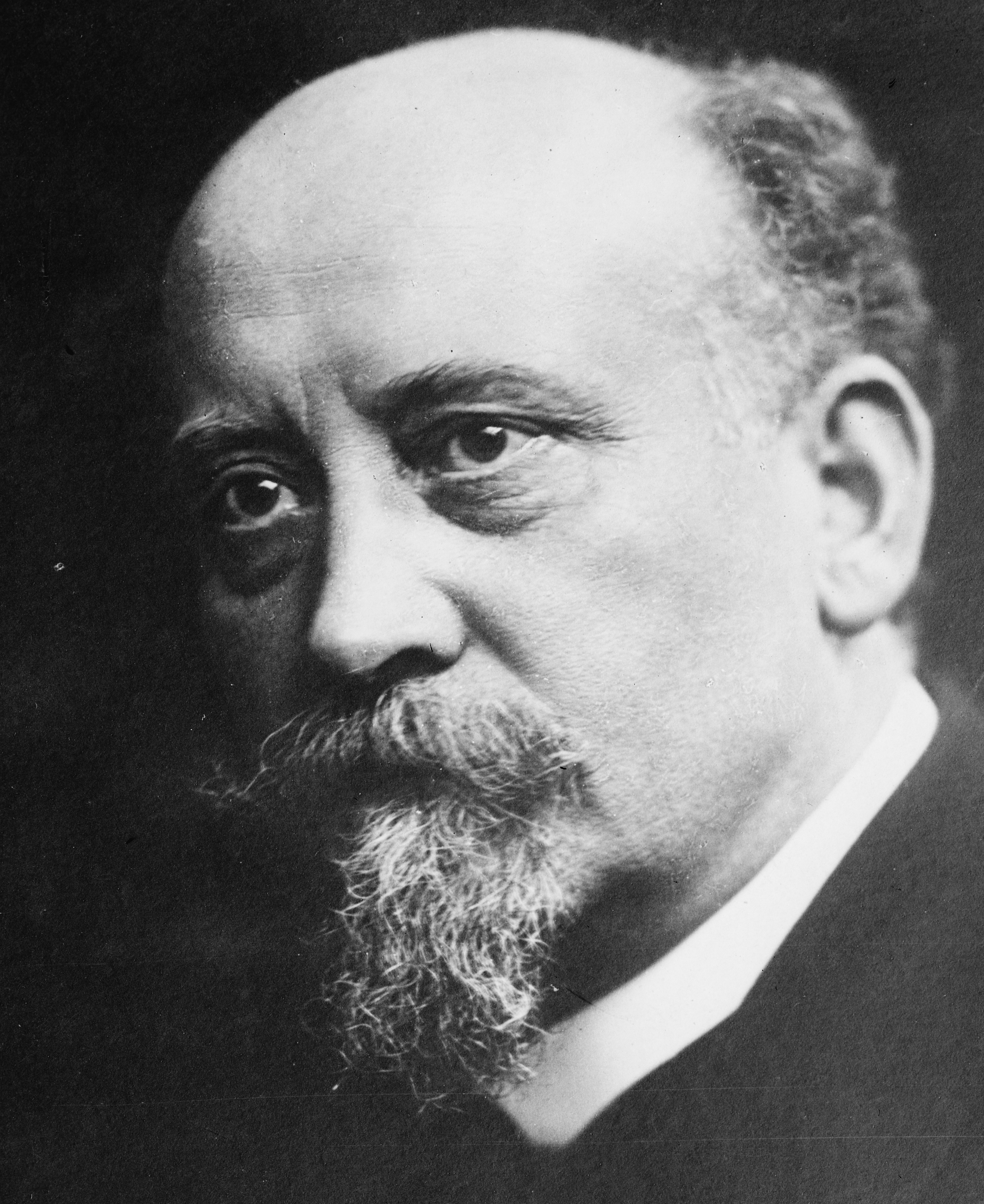
Philipp Scheidemann. He and Friedrich Ebert were the strongest voices for the SPD on the Council of the People's Deputies.

The Council of the People's Deputies relied on the expertise of the former Empire's state secretaries (equivalent to ministers), most of whom retained their positions. They generally preferred to work with the more moderate SPD on the councils rather than the USPD. This gave the SPD a distinct power advantage. The SPD also held the more important portfolios: Ebert had internal and military affairs, Landsberg finance and Scheidemann press and intelligence. The USPD members held foreign affairs, justice and colonies (Haase); transportation and demobilisation (Dittmann) and social policy (Barth). The Executive Council of Greater Berlin issued laws and decrees affecting basic rights such as freedom of opinion and social policy. The eight-hour working day was introduced on 26 November 1918.

A network of revolutionary bodies stretching from the Council of the People's Deputies to the governments of the federal states and the local workers' and soldiers' councils, all dominated by the SPD, quickly covered Germany. The soldiers gave it armed power, while its economic and social power came from the workers' ability to strike and the people's to demonstrate. With this network, its own party and union structures, and cooperation with middle class Catholic and liberal parties at the local level, the SPD was able to keep the left-wing radicals for the most part out of the councils.

== Reich Congress of Workers' and Soldiers' Councils ==
The Reich Congress of Workers' and Soldiers' Councils (Reichskongress der Arbeiter- und Soldatenräte or Reichsrätekongress) was called by the Executive Council of Greater Berlin and met from 16 to 20 December in the Prussian House of Representatives building. Delegates were elected from across Germany, about one for every 200,000 civilians and one for every 100,000 soldiers. Of the 514 delegates, 288 supported the SPD, 88 the USPD and 10 the Spartacus League. Karl Liebknecht and Rosa Luxemburg, the Spartacus leaders, had not been elected to the Congress, and a proposal to let them sit in as guests in an advisory capacity was turned down.

The central question that the Congress discussed continued to be whether Germany was to have a council or a parliamentary form of government. Ernst Däumig spoke for the USPD in support of a pure council system. It was to be the basis for the constitution of a socialist republic in which the workers' and soldiers' councils would have the highest legislative and executive power in the state. Däumig called it the "death sentence of the revolution" when his proposal was voted down 344 to 98. Richard Müller said later: "The Central Congress was Germany's first revolutionary tribunal, but there was no sign of any revolutionary breeze. I didn't set my expectations very high beforehand, but I hadn't believed that the Congress would turn into a political suicide club."

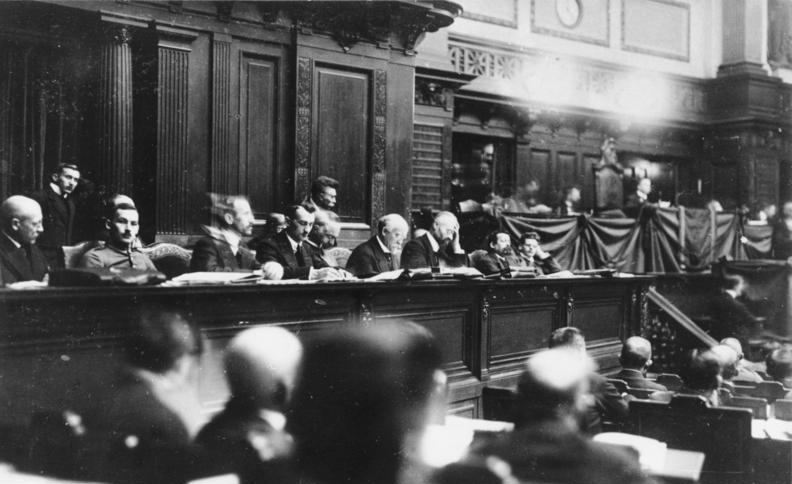
First Reich Congress of Workers' and Soldiers' Councils in the Prussian House of Representatives in Berlin. On the ministerial bench, from right to left, the People's Deputies Barth, Ebert, Landsberg and Scheidemann

Max Cohen for the SPD proposed to hold the election to the national assembly on 19 January 1919, almost a month earlier than the Council of the People's Deputies had agreed to in late November. That the Congress passed the resolution by an eight-to-one margin was a clear sign that the majority of the attendees were in favour of a parliamentary democracy. Against the radical Left's accusation that the SPD was trying to end the revolution, Cohen warned of the possible unforeseen domestic and foreign consequences of a council system.

The Congress then approved a proposal by the SPD to give the Council of the People's Deputies legislative and executive power until the national assembly made a final decision on the form of government. Oversight of the Council was switched from the Executive Council of Greater Berlin to a new Central Council of the German Socialist Republic (Zentralrat der Deutschen Sozialistischen Republik). After the Congress accepted the SPD's definition of parliamentary oversight, the USPD boycotted the election to the Central Council, with the result that it had only SPD members. Its chairperson was Max Cohen. As a result of the establishment of the Central Council, the Executive Council of Greater Berlin faded in importance. Its influence was limited to Berlin, where it played a role in the Berlin March Battles of 1919. Its remnants, by that time referred to as the "Red Council", were suppressed by the Reichswehr in November 1919.

The SPD leadership was less happy with two other votes at the Congress. Delegates approved a proposal for the Council of the People's Deputies to move quickly to nationalise all industries that were "ripe" for it, especially mining. With the oversight of the Executive Council of Greater Berlin, the People's Deputies were also to exercise military command authority and to see to the ending of militarism and the abolition of blind obedience (Kadavergehorsam) in the military. The Congress also voted unanimously for the democratisation of the military as laid out in the Hamburg Points: there were to be no more rank insignia and no carrying of weapons when not in service; soldiers were to elect officers; soldiers' councils were to be responsible for discipline; and the standing army was to be replaced by a people's army (Volkswehr). Army Command strongly objected to the Hamburg Points, and no trace of them was left in the Weimar Constitution when it went into effect on 14 August 1919.

The results of the Congress showed that the councils wanted to democratise the government and the military and did not see themselves as a substitute for a parliament. The SPD's leadership wanted to integrate itself into a parliamentarised government and co-govern within it. In keeping with its support of a democracy that included all of German society and not just the workers and soldiers, it delayed the Congress' reform resolutions in order not to anticipate the national assembly's democratic choices. In doing so, it angered the radical Left and made itself increasingly reliant on the former Empire's powers, which had not been abolished or thoroughly reformed, especially the military.

The Central Council convened a second congress, the Reich Congress of Workers', Farmers' and Soldiers' Councils, on 8 April 1919. The weeklong Council, the last such at the national level, agreed among other things on new electoral regulations for workers' councils.

== 1919 violence ==
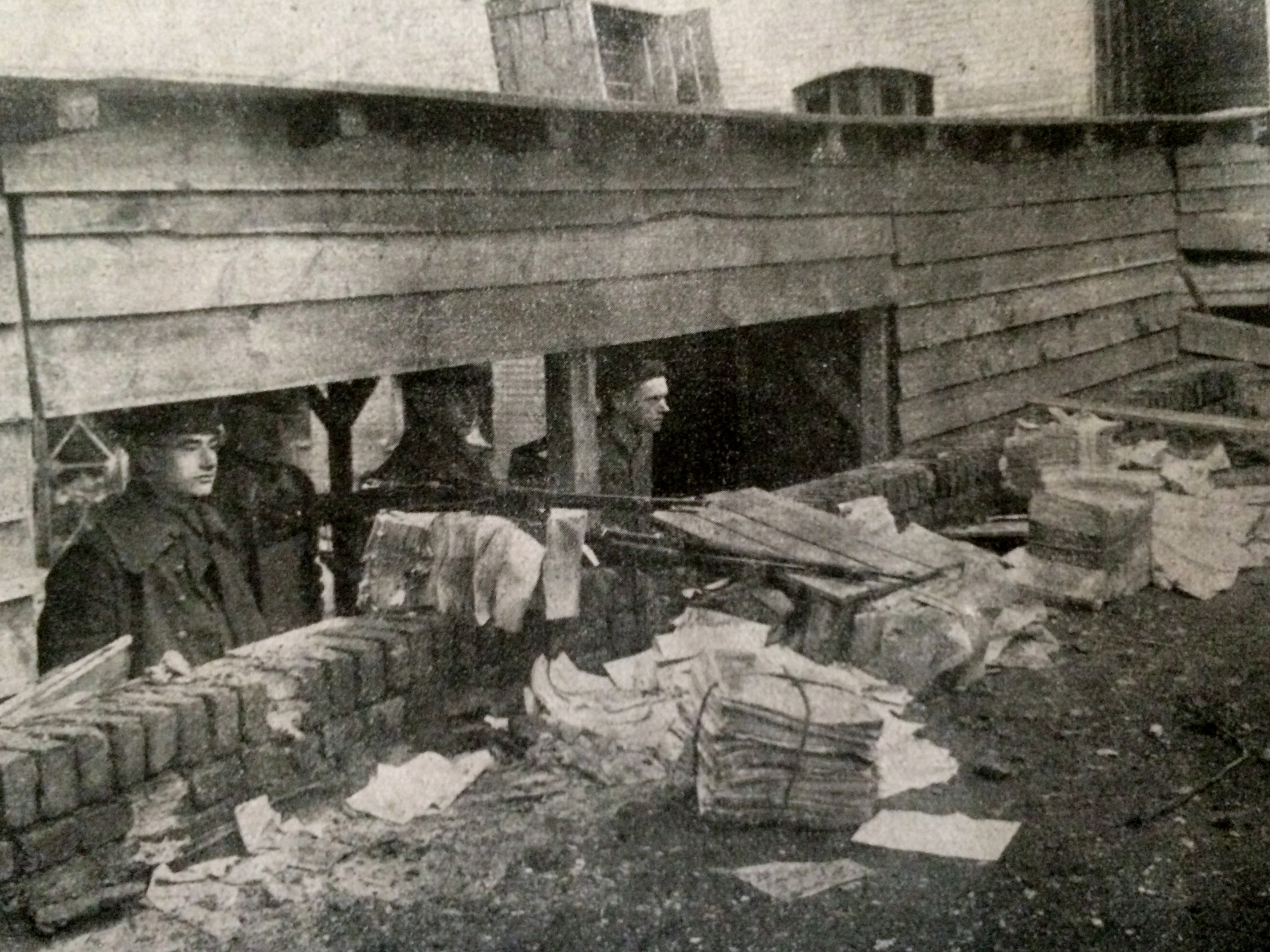
Government troops in the Vorwärts building during the Spartacist uprising in Berlin

At the end of December 1918, the three USPD members of the Council of the People's Deputies resigned in protest over the SPD's use of the military against the People's Navy Division during the Christmas crisis. They were replaced by two new SPD representatives, Gustav Noske and Rudolf Wissell. The popular discontent over the events of Christmas week led to the formation of a revolutionary committee by Georg Ledebour (USPD) and Karl Liebknecht of the newly established Communist Party of Germany (KPD) on 6 January 1919. With the goal of blocking the elections for a national assembly and setting up a soviet democracy, they declared the Council of the People's Deputies deposed. In the ensuing street battles of the Spartacist uprising, an estimated 165 people lost their lives, mostly revolutionaries killed by the regular and Freikorps units brought in by the Council of the People's Deputies.

An even bloodier uprising known as the Berlin March Battles broke out in March 1919. It was led by the KPD and attempted to gain recognition and guarantees for the workers' and soldiers' councils, set up a soviet democracy and adopt the Hamburg Points democratising the military. The regular army and Freikorps again suppressed the revolt. The death toll was about 1,200. Additional worker unrest took place through early May 1919 in Hamburg, Bremen, Munich and the coal-mining regions of western and central Germany.

== Local councils ==
=== Hamburg ===
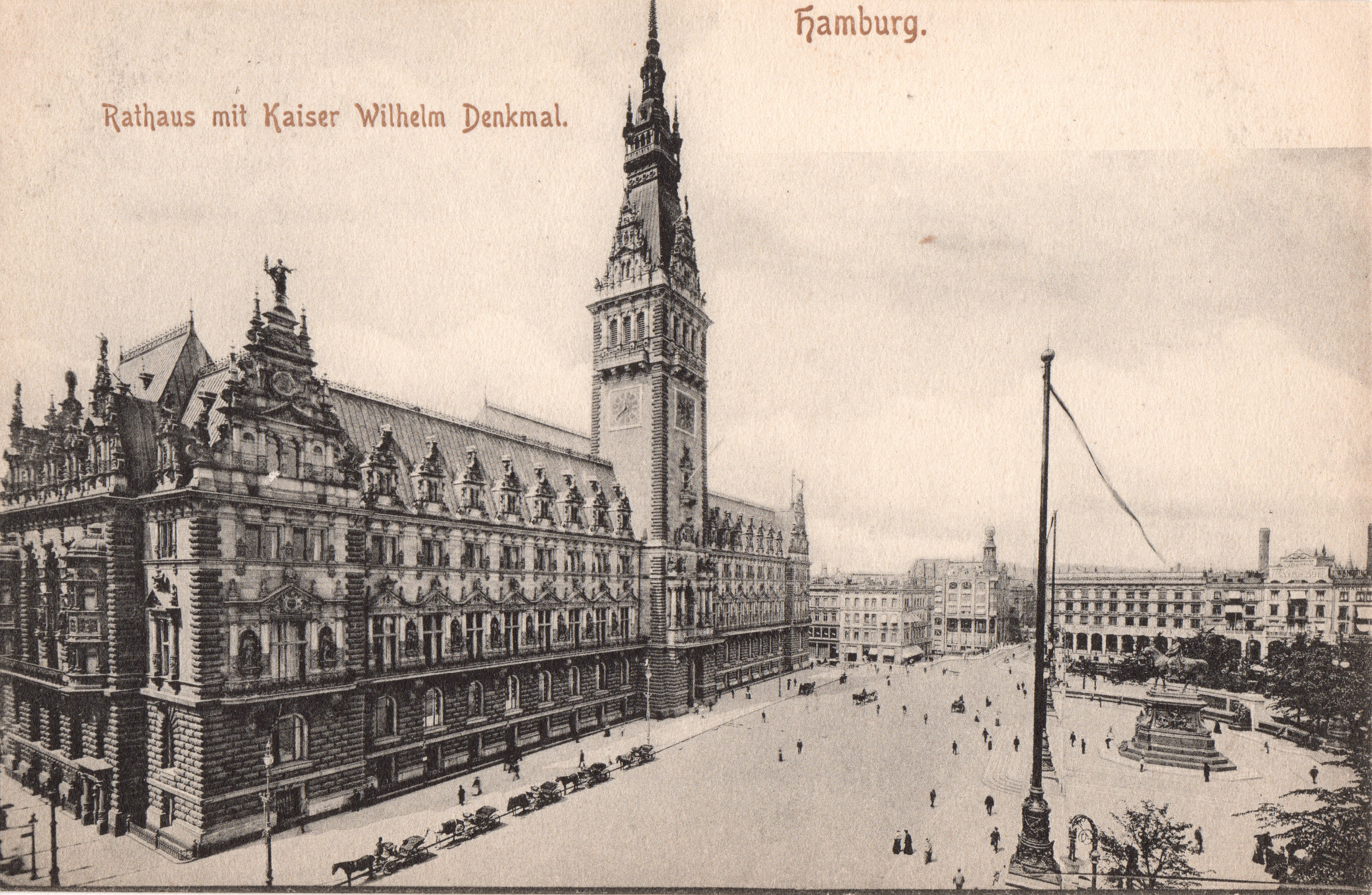
Hamburg City Hall in a 19th century postcard

Hamburg's workers' and soldiers' councils were representative of others that were set up in cities across Germany. On the night of 5/6 November, a group of sailors from Kiel reached the port of Hamburg, disarmed the torpedo boats there and won the crews over to their side. They occupied the main train station and union hall without resistance, but soldiers at an infantry barracks fought back and before they surrendered left a number of revolutionaries dead. The sailors established a provisional workers' and soldiers' council under USPD leadership on 6 November. After the council announced that it had political control of Hamburg, there was a mass march to the local military headquarters at Altona. Some shots were fired at them along the route, but when they reached the Altona headquarters, they found it deserted. On 8 November, delegates were elected to choose the 30 members of the permanent workers' and soldiers' council. Eighteen were to represent the factories, with the remainder divided equally between USPD, SPD, the unions and the left-wing radicals. The leaders of the new Council were a communist, Heinrich Laufenberg, and Wilhelm Heise. The USPD was the strongest group in the Council. It eliminated the Hamburg Parliament on the 12th but had to restore it on the 18th because the city lost its creditworthiness when the parliament was abolished. The Council, however, maintained a veto right over its actions. It announced the election of a new parliament, but as was the case at the national level, the SPD wanted the election to take place as soon as possible while the USPD stalled.

In preparation for the December meeting in Berlin of the Reich Congress of Workers' and Soldiers' Councils, the Hamburg Council drew up the Hamburg Points that were adopted there.

Hamburg's parliamentary election was held on 16 March 1919. The SPD won the largest share of the votes with 60%. The USPD had 9% and the Communist Party of Germany (KPD) 7%. On 26 March, the Hamburg Workers' and Soldiers' Council passed its power to the constituent parliament which wrote the city's new constitution.

=== Berlin-Neukölln ===
The radical council at Neukölln, a neighborhood of Berlin, took control of all local government departments, abolished the municipal authorities, took over the banks and declared housing to be communal property. On the 16th of December 1918, armed supporters of the provisional government of Friedrich Ebert forced it to postpone its plans for collectivisation of local property. The council then let the SPD take seats on local executive councils and reintroduced the municipal authorities it had abolished.

=== Councils in the larger states ===
For the activities of workers' and soldiers' councils in the larger states of the Weimar Republic, see the linked sections in:

- Free State of Anhalt
- Republic of Baden
- Free State of Bavaria
- Free State of Coburg
- People's State of Hesse
- Free State of Prussia
- Free State of Saxony
- State of Thuringia
- Free People's State of Württemberg

== End of the councils ==
In the election for the national assembly on 19 January 1919, the SPD won 38% of the vote and the USPD 8%. The SPD joined with the Centre Party and the German Democratic Party to form the ruling Weimar Coalition.

On 4 February 1919, the Central Council transferred its powers to what came to be called the Weimar National Assembly. The Council of the People's Deputies ceased to exist on 13 February when it passed its authority to the government of Minister President Philipp Scheidemann, newly elected by the National Assembly. The individual workers' and soldiers' councils across Germany lost their remaining legitimacy when the Weimar Constitution became effective on 14 August 1919. The last of them dissolved late in the autumn of that year.

== See also ==
- People's State of Bavaria
- Bremen Soviet Republic
- Munich Soviet Republic
- Würzburg Soviet Republic
- Danish workers' and soldiers' councils
- Reich Citizens' Council
