= Berlin March Battles =

Unrest in the German revolution of 1918–1919

- Part of the German revolution of 1918–1919
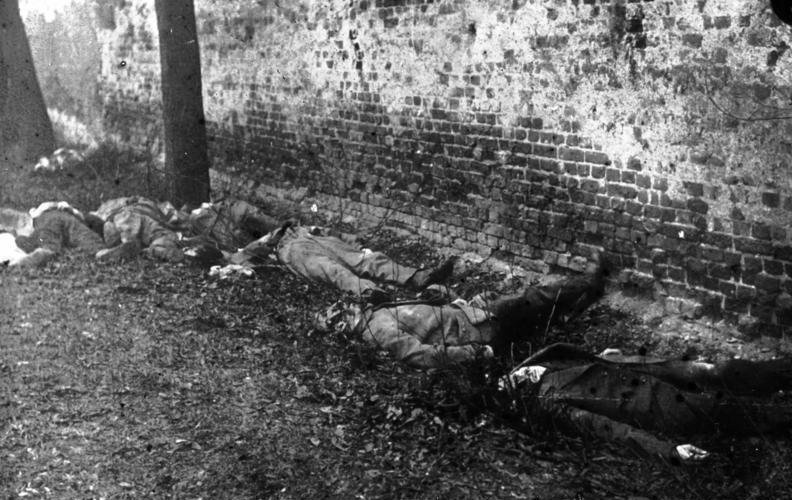
- Revolutionaries executed by the Freikorps
- Date: 3–16 March 1919
- Location: Berlin, Germany
- Caused by: Absence of soviet/council democracy and the democratization of the military
- Result: Government victory: The German revolution of 1918–1919 draws to an end

Parties
(Germany) Weimar Republic: Freikorps; MSPD	Berlin strikers: KPD; USPD

Lead figures
(Germany) Friedrich Ebert (Germany) Gustav Noske (Germany) Wilhelm Reinhard (Germany) Waldemar Pabst (Germany) Walther von Lüttwitz	Richard Müller; Leo Jogiches (executed)

Units involved
Freikorps Reinhard; Freikorps Lützow; Freikorps Hülsen; Guards Cavalry Rifle Division; German Protection Division	Volksmarinedivision; Republican Soldiers' Army (breakaway group); Informal units of USPD and KPD

Casualties and losses
75 killed	
- Total: 1,200–3,000 killed, including civilians

The Berlin March Battles of 1919 (German: Berliner Märzkämpfe), also known as Bloody Week (German: Berliner Blutwoche), were the final major event of the German revolution of 1918–1919. The fighting grew out of a general strike by Berlin workers who wanted to implement the revolution's major radical-left demands, including the socialization of key industries, the legal safeguarding of workers' and soldiers' councils and the democratization of the military.

The general strike, which began on 3 March 1919, was supported by the Communist Party of Germany (KPD), the Independent Social Democratic Party (USPD) and, more reservedly, the Majority Social Democratic Party (MSPD). The government responded with the imposition of a state of siege on Berlin and orders for the deployment of the paramilitary Freikorps. After fierce fighting, the strike leadership ordered on 8 March that the general strike be ended. Estimates of the number killed in the violence ranged from 1,200 to 3,000; many of them were civilians.

The Berlin March Battles contributed to the Majority Social Democratic Party losing influence both locally and nationally. Relations between it and the Communist Party were left permanently in tatters.

== Background ==
The March Battles were rooted in a conflict between the moderate and radical elements of the German working class that had carried out the first stage of the German revolution of 1918–1919. Primarily through the spread of workers' and soldiers' councils, it had all but bloodlessly brought down the Hohenzollern monarchy in November 1918. The workers and soldiers aligned with the radical Left, represented by the Communist Party of Germany (KPD) and the Independent Social Democratic Party (USPD), wanted to build on the councils to socialize key industries, democratize the military and create a council republic similar to the one set up in Soviet Russia a year earlier. The moderate socialists led by Friedrich Ebert and the Majority Social Democrats (MSPD) – along with the overwhelming majority of the middle and upper classes – feared a social revolution like the one in Russia. Ebert and the MSPD wanted a democratically elected assembly to decide Germany's future form of government. They pushed for it be a parliamentary republic.

On 18 December 1918, the Reich Congress of Workers' and Soldiers' Councils meeting in Berlin voted 344 to 98 to reject a proposal by the USPD to establish a council republic and instead passed a motion from the MSPD which called for an election to a national assembly that would write a new constitution for Germany. The MSPD-dominated Congress also voted to support the democratization of the military as laid out in the Hamburg Points. Its key demands were that the Council of the People's Deputies – Germany's revolutionary government made up of three MSPD and three USPD members – was to hold the power of command over all army and navy units, all rank insignia were to be abolished, and soldiers' councils were to elect their own leaders and be responsible for discipline. The Army Command, whose support the MSPD was convinced it needed, strongly objected to the Hamburg Points, and they were never implemented.

The January 1919 election to the Weimar National Assembly saw the USPD win only 7.6% of the vote; the KPD, which was just three weeks old at the time, did not participate. The MSPD, with 37.9% of the vote, by far the most of any party, formed a moderate government known as the Weimar Coalition that included itself, the liberal German Democratic Party and the conservative Catholic Centre Party.

The months following the election saw violence and labour unrest across the country. In January 1919, the Spartacist uprising in Berlin by the KPD and backers of a council republic was suppressed by Freikorps troops and government forces that supported the MSPD. There were general strikes in Upper Silesia in January, in the Ruhr in February and in central Germany around Halle, Merseburg, Leipzig and Erfurt from February to early March. During the same period, attempts were made to establish council rule on a local level in Bremen, Brunswick and Bavaria, all of which were put down by forces loyal to the MSPD-led government.

== General strike ==
In the general assembly of the Berlin Workers' Council of 26–28 February, a resolution that called for the enactment of the Hamburg Points and condemned the Weimar National Assembly was passed with a wide majority that included MSPD-aligned members. The outcome of the resolution as well as information about the general mood of the factory workers was telegraphed to the government in Weimar.

On February 28 delegates began to discuss a resolution for a general strike to show their support for the strikers in the Ruhr and central Germany, but under pressure from the MSPD the vote was postponed until the next meeting on 3 March. Before the conclusion of the meeting, an election was held to the Executive Council of the Berlin general assembly in which the USPD and MSPD each won seven seats, the Communists two and German Democratic Party one. This gave the Independents and Communists a majority. In the next meeting on 3 March, the vote was decisively in favor of the call for a general strike with the following goals:

- Recognition of the workers' and soldiers' councils
- Complete implementation of the Hamburg Points
- Release of all political prisoners
- Lifting of the state of siege
- Arrest of all those involved in political murders
- Organization of the workers' guard
- Dissolution of the Freikorps
- Resumption of political and economic relations with the Russian Soviet Republic

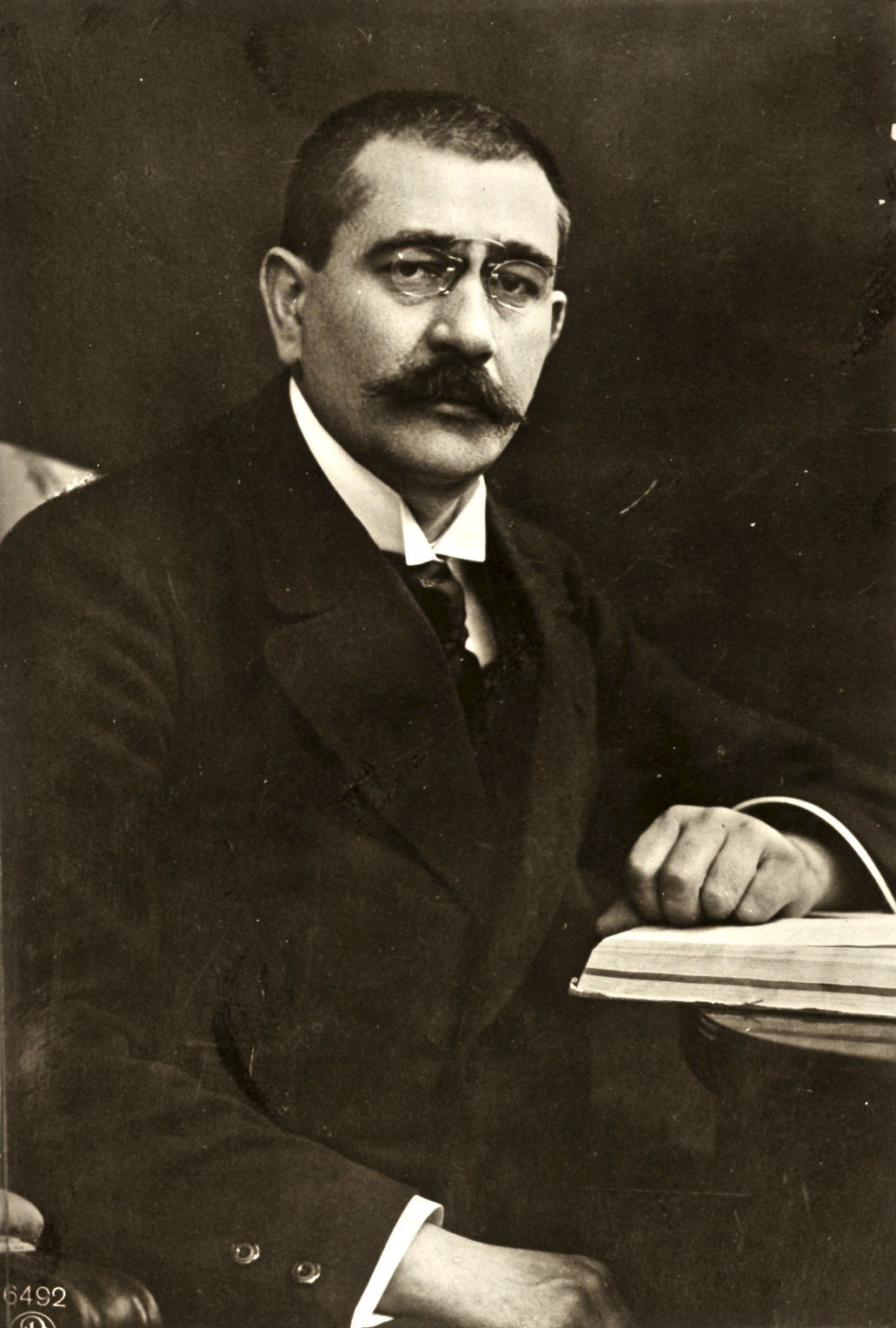
Gustav Noske, the Defence Minister at the time of the strike

Nearly all MSPD-aligned members supported the resolution in spite of the Berlin MSPD's warning against a strike in their newspaper Vorwärts the previous day. The KPD had simultaneously drawn up its own strike goals which included a call for a revolutionary tribunal to prosecute the MSPD's political leaders (Friedrich Ebert, Philipp Scheidemann and Gustav Noske). The KPD representatives on the Executive Council, and therefore also on the strike's leadership committee, resigned on 4 March because it included members of the MSPD.

On 3 March, the Prussian state government declared a state of siege over Berlin. Gustav Noske, the Social Democratic Reich Defence Minister, was subsequently provided with extensive civil and military powers. Public demonstrations were banned by his decree along with the distribution of newspapers. Force was authorized against those infringing on the decree. From 3–4 March, violent encounters occurred between police and striking workers. The industry, commerce and transport of Berlin had largely ceased to function by 4 March. Looting of shops by strikers was reported and denounced by the revolutionaries. Noske used the incidents as a pretext to send the Freikorps into Berlin. In particular there was a conflict over the printing of newspapers. The printers did not initially join the strike, which allowed the MSPD newspaper Vorwärts to be published. The Berlin Workers' Council agreed that no newspapers should be published, but the Communists insisted that only the KPD newspaper Die Rote Fahne and USPD's Die Freiheit should be published.

On 6 March, the fourth day of the strike, USPD delegates proposed that water, gas and electricity workers should join the strike amidst the increasingly violent situation in Berlin. The MSPD delegates opposed the extension but were outvoted. That prompted their withdrawal from the Berlin Workers' Council and the strike committee, and the MSPD soon appealed for the strike to be called off. The MSPD's control of the Berlin Trade Union Commission proved decisive, as they too called for the strike to end. The printers were the first to return to work. Attempts to negotiate a conditional end to the strike under terms drafted on 7 March proved fruitless. That prompted the resignation of Richard Müller (USPD) from the strike committee, which was followed up with the unconditional cancellation of the general strike on 8 March.

== Deployment of the Freikorps ==
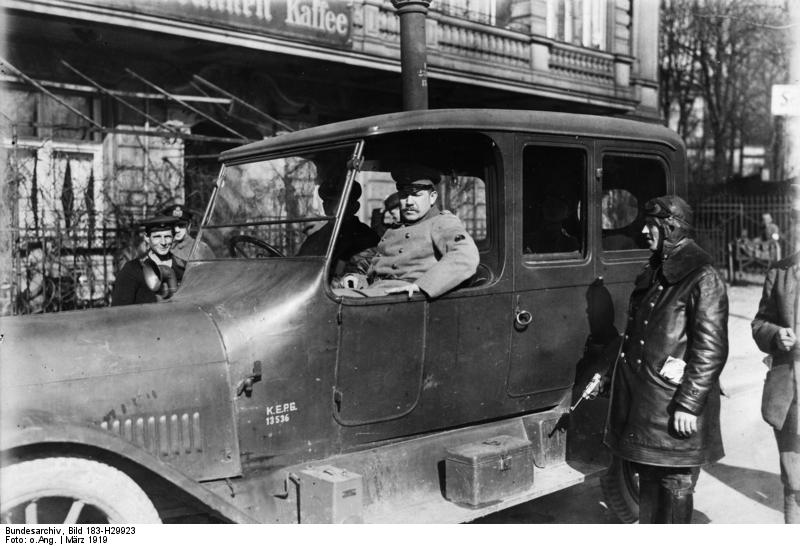
Wilhelm Reinhard, commander of the Freikorps in Lichtenberg

Violence between government forces and striking workers began almost immediately after the approval of the general strike resolution on 3 March. The publishing office for Die Rote Fahne was raided and destroyed by government forces that same day. In the afternoon and evening, many workers gathered in the Scheunenviertel district and the Alexanderplatz, and clashes began with police. This was followed by the looting of shops and the storming of police stations for weaponry. The actions were denounced by the strike leadership as being staged by "provocateurs". Vorwärts also stressed that such actions were not those of the strikers.

On 4 March government troops entered the city. On the side of the counterrevolutionaries were five formations: the Freikorps Reinhard, Freikorps Lützow, Freikorps Hülsen, Guards Cavalry Rifle Division and German Protection Division (Deutsche Schutzdivision). Walther von Lüttwitz was in command of all Freikorps in Berlin and the surrounding area, while Wilhelm Reinhard commanded the Freikorps Reinhard, and Waldemar Pabst, known as one of the men behind the murders of Rosa Luxemburg and Karl Liebknecht, commanded the Guards Cavalry Rifle Division. In Spandau, revolutionary soldiers guarding a weapons depot were fired on and eventually disarmed. The news of the incident inflamed the anger of the strikers. A unit of Freikorps tried to drive through a crowd, and the commanding officer was intercepted by the strikers. Freikorps forces soon intervened with armored cars and tanks and fired on the crowd, resulting in deaths and injuries. In an attempt to calm the situation, Richard Müller publicly disassociated the strike from those engaging in "trouble-making". The Communists warned in a leaflet against engaging in putschism.

The situation grew more volatile on 5 March after Freikorps forces attacked a detachment from the Volksmarinedivision that had attempted to negotiate the occupation of the police headquarters. As the delegation left the negotiations, a sailor, Rudolf Klöppel, was fatally shot in the back. The incident shifted the allegiance of the sailors, who distributed weapons to strikers and began to actively fight the Freikorps. They were joined by some members of the Republican Soldiers' Army (Republikanische Soldatenwehr), which had been formed to protect the revolutionary government led by Ebert. Barricades were erected in the Alexanderplatz, and the most brutal fighting of the strike commenced. The Freikorps attacked with tanks, armored cars, artillery, mortars and machine guns. The fighting continued over the following days in the areas north and east of the Alexanderplatz.

=== The "Lichtenberg police murder" and other false reports ===
On 8 March, the Lichtenberg Post Office, occupied by Freikorps, was captured by insurgents. They then stormed the police headquarters, which was also taken after heavy fighting. Twenty police officers were taken prisoner but released that night, while the rest, including the police chief, were able to escape. They gave inaccurate reports of supposed atrocities to government troops and the media, alleging that the insurgents had ordered all officers to be executed. The story spread rapidly through bourgeois newspapers and reached Vorwärts as well. Press reports gave figures from 60 to 200 officers killed. In reality, only 2 officers were killed during the fighting. Other false information reported by the media included that of "Spartacist-minded" airmen dropping bombs on civilians, as well as supposed "Spartacist piles" of civilian bodies.

It was a few days before the press began to correct the stories:

It was not until 13 March that the B.Z. reported that the officers had in reality been released. On the same day, Vossische and Vorwärts, based on the statements of Mayor Ziethen, declared 'that all the news about the mass shootings of guards and detectives in the takeover of the Lichtenberg police headquarters have proved untrue'. Finally, after the B.Z. issue of 14 March and the obituary of the fallen, it turned out that only two police officers were dead. One of them fell in battle and nothing could be ascertained about the death of the other.

=== Actions of the military ===
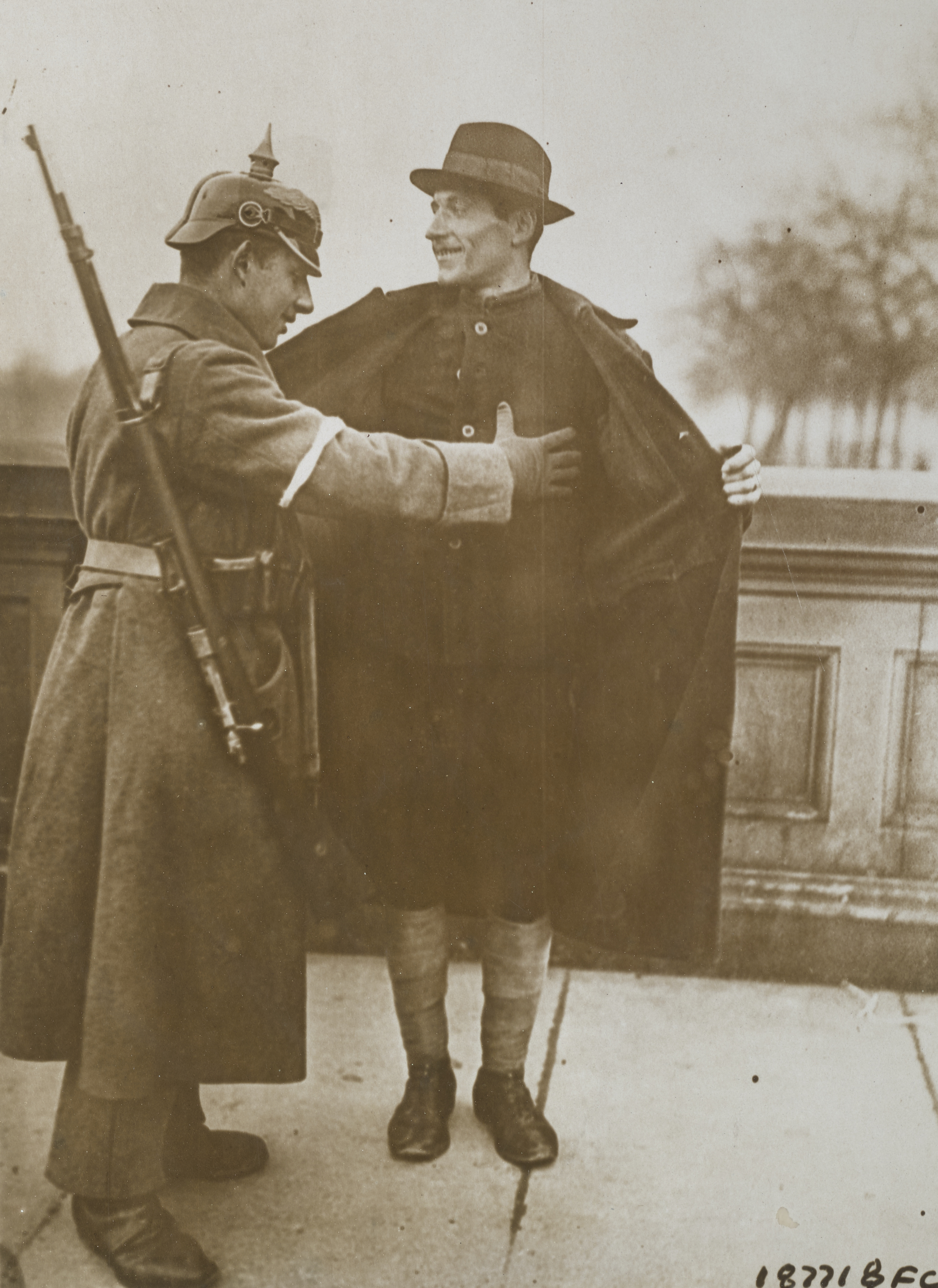
Alleged Spartacist being searched by a soldier

On 9 March, using the misreported atrocities as justification, Gustav Noske announced:

The brutality and bestiality of the Spartacists who fight against us compel me to give the following order: any person who is caught with arms in his hands in the fight against the government will be shot on the spot.

The military took the order further, ordering that anyone caught with weapons in their homes be shot. Firearms searches began at random, resulting in numerous summary executions, including of those uninvolved in the strike. The Freikorps indiscriminately attacked residential buildings with the claim that they had been shot at, leaving entire areas in ruin from artillery and aerial bombs. Residents fled to their cellars but supported the insurgents by providing food and drink. On 11 March, 29 sailors of the Volksmarinedivision were shot when they went to surrender and collect their discharge pay. The sailors were picked out of several hundred prisoners because they "looked intelligent". Colonel Reinhard had ordered the shooting allegedly because the prisons were overcrowded.

The conservative mayor of Lichtenberg, Oskar Ziethen, sought a truce between Noske and the insurgents to avoid further bloodshed. His advances were rejected, as Noske insisted on "unconditional surrender or nothing". The last barricade fell on 12 March. By 13 March the fighting had almost completely ended, although the shooting order was not lifted until 16 March.

Estimates of the death toll range from 1,200 to 3,000, with small losses for government forces. Among those killed was KPD leader Leo Jogiches on 10 March, who was shot while allegedly trying to escape from the police. Alongside the deaths were thousands of arrests, with about 4,500 prisoners being crowded into the Moabit and Plötzensee prisons. Conditions were inhumane and prisoners were often mistreated or had their injuries neglected, leading to additional deaths.

== Results ==
The military, dominated by former imperial officers, had long planned to disarm the population and revolutionary soldiers. The March Battles saw the dissolution of the Volksmarinedivision and the weakening of the republican militias. On 6 March the Freikorps was legally integrated into the provisional Reichswehr, a move that would be important later in the Kapp–Lüttwitz Putsch.

The Lichtenberg city council established a commission to determine the cost of the damage, which presented its analysis in April 1919. They estimated a loss of 1.5 million Reichsmarks in the public sector and 450,000 Reichsmarks in the private sector.

The collaboration of the MSPD with the Freikorps did not go unnoticed, with the events contributing to its loss of influence both locally and nationally. Lichtenberg would become a stronghold for the USPD and KPD, and relations between the Communists and the Social Democrats were left permanently in tatters. The June 1920 Reichstag election saw votes for the MSPD drop by 16%, with the USPD emerging in second place.

The historian Ralf Hoffrogge sees the general strike and the March Battles as a turning point in the history of the November Revolution and emphasizes its supra-regional significance:

Unlike the January Uprising, the March strikes were a supra-regional movement and therefore far more dangerous for the government. In the Ruhr area, central Germany and Berlin, mass strikes called for the recognition of workers councils and the immediate socialization of key industries. The National Assembly in Weimar was virtually surrounded by the general strike and unable to act. [...] But the strikes were not coordinated temporally and spatially. While they were gaining momentum in one region, they were already crumbling elsewhere. Although they forced the government to make verbal concessions, they later could be individually beaten down.

== See also ==
- German revolution of 1918–1919
- 1918 Christmas crisis
- Spartacist uprising
- Bavarian Soviet Republic
- Bremen Soviet Republic
- March Action
- Ruhr uprising
- Hamburg Uprising
