= List of German monarchs in 1918 =

German Empire
- Imperial standard of the German Emperor (1871–1918)
- Preceded by: Kingdom of Prussia
- Followed by: Abolished 1918

When the German Empire collapsed in 1918 at the end of World War I, it was a federal union made up of three free cities and 22 kingdoms, grand duchies, duchies and principalities, with an emperor, Wilhelm II, at its head. All of the 22 ruling monarchs – including Wilhelm, who was also King of Prussia – abdicated in November 1918 during the early weeks of the German revolution of 1918–1919.

The term German Empire (Deutsches Kaiserreich) commonly refers to Germany from its foundation as a unified nation-state on 18 January 1871 until the abdication of its last Kaiser, Wilhelm II, was proclaimed on 9 November 1918. Germans, when referring to the Reich in this period under the Kaisers, 1871 to 1918, typically use the term Kaiserreich.

Federal prince (Bundesfürst) was the generic term for the royal heads of state (monarchs) of the various states making up the German Empire. The empire was a federal state, with its constituent states remaining sovereign states. In total, there were 22 federal princes of the German Empire and additionally three republican heads of state and the steward of the imperial territory ruled by Alsace-Lorraine. The states became part of the Kaiserreich by an 1871 treaty. The Kaiser as head of the empire was granted the title German Emperor (the style "Emperor of Germany" being deliberately avoided due to revanchist connotations), and was simultaneously a federal prince as King of Prussia, the sovereign of its largest federal state. Of the princely heads of state, 4 held the title King (König) (the Kings of Prussia, Bavaria, Saxony, and Württemberg), 6 held the title Grand Duke (Großherzog), 5 held the title Duke (Herzog), and 7 held the title Prince (i.e. Sovereign Prince, Fürst).

Following the unilateral proclamation of the abdication of Wilhelm II on 9 November 1918 by German Chancellor Maximilian von Baden and the German Revolution of 1918–19, the German nobility and royalty as legally defined classes were abolished on 11 August 1919 with the promulgation of the Weimar Constitution, under which all Germans were made equal before the law, and the legal rights and privileges, and all following German Houses, titles, insignia and ranks of nobility were abolished.

The list does not include local rulers in German colonies such as Yuhi V of Rwanda, Mwambutsa IV of Burundi and Aweida of Nauru.

Ruler	Name	Arms	Flag	Location
	Wilhelm II of Germany			Kingdom of Prussia
	Ludwig III of Bavaria			Kingdom of Bavaria
	Frederick Augustus III of Saxony			Kingdom of Saxony
	William II of Württemberg			Kingdom of Württemberg
	Friedrich II of Baden			Grand Duchy of Baden
	Frederick Augustus II of Oldenburg			Grand Duchy of Oldenburg
	William Ernest of Saxe-Weimar-Eisenach			Grand Duchy of Saxe-Weimar-Eisenach
	Frederick Francis IV			Grand Duchy of Mecklenburg-Schwerin
	Frederick Francis IV			Grand Duchy of Mecklenburg-Strelitz
	Ernest Louis of Hesse			Grand Duchy of Hesse
	Ernest Augustus of Brunswick			Duchy of Brunswick
	Charles Edward of Saxe-Coburg-Gotha			Duchy of Saxe-Coburg-Gotha
	Bernhard III of Saxe-Meiningen			Duchy of Saxe-Meiningen
	Ernst II of Saxe-Altenburg			Duchy of Saxe-Altenburg
	Joachim Ernst of Anhalt			Duchy of Anhalt
	Leopold IV of Lippe			Principality of Lippe
	Adolphus II of Schaumburg-Lippe			Principality of Schaumburg-Lippe
	Günther Victor of Schwarzburg			Principality of Schwarzburg-Sondershausen
	Günther Victor of Schwarzburg			Principality of Schwarzburg-Rudolstadt
	Friedrich of Waldeck and Pyrmont			Principality of Waldeck and Pyrmont
	Heinrich XXIV of Reuss-Greiz			Principality of Reuss-Greiz
	Heinrich XXVII of Reuss-Gera			Principality of Reuss-Gera

== November Revolution abdications ==
Throughout the month of November 1918, all 22 monarchs within the German Empire were either forced to abdicate, or stepped down of their own accord. Duke Ernest Augustus of Brunswick was the first to do so on 8 November. The next day, the Emperor and King of Prussia Wilhelm II, went into exile in the Netherlands, and his abdication (which he would not officially confirm until 28 November, see below) was announced by his Chancellor and Prussian Minister President Maximilian of Baden. MSPD co-chairman Philipp Scheidemann proclaimed the new "German Republic" from the Reichstag building to gathered crowds, while two hours thereafter Spartacist leader Karl Liebknecht proclaimed the "Free Socialist Republic of Germany" at Berlin Palace. Neither proclamation of the republic was constitutional, and the political situation remained chaotic for several more months, with a short civil war erupting between radical leftist revolutionaries and the more moderate post-imperial social democrat government that would emerge victorious and form the Weimar Republic. Nevertheless, the proclamations and Wilhelm II's abdication triggered a powerful domino effect: the same day a number of other princes stepped down, and within a week most monarchs in Germany had followed suit. The last to abdicate was King William II of Württemberg on 30 November 1918.

Date	Title and name	State
9 November 1918	Emperor and King Wilhelm II	German Empire, Kingdom of Prussia
13 November 1918	King Ludwig III	Kingdom of Bavaria
13 November 1918	King Frederick Augustus III	Kingdom of Saxony
30 November 1918	King William II	Kingdom of Württemberg
22 November 1918	Grand Duke Frederick II	Grand Duchy of Baden
9 November 1918	Grand Duke Ernest Louis	Grand Duchy of Hesse
14 November 1918	Grand Duke Frederick Francis IV	Grand Duchy of Mecklenburg-Schwerin
14 November 1918	Regent Frederick Francis	Grand Duchy of Mecklenburg-Strelitz
11 November 1918	Grand Duke Frederick Augustus II	Grand Duchy of Oldenburg
9 November 1918	Grand Duke William Ernest	Grand Duchy of Saxe-Weimar-Eisenach
12 November 1918	Duke Joachim Ernst	Duchy of Anhalt
8 November 1918	Duke Ernest Augustus	Duchy of Brunswick
13 November 1918	Duke Ernst II	Duchy of Saxe-Altenburg
14 November 1918	Duke Charles Edward	Duchy of Saxe-Coburg and Gotha
10 November 1918	Duke Bernhard III	Duchy of Saxe-Meiningen
12 November 1918	Prince Leopold IV	Principality of Lippe
15 November 1918	Prince Adolf II	Principality of Schaumburg-Lippe
22 November 1918	Prince Günther Victor	Principalities of Schwarzburg-Rudolstadt and Schwarzburg-Sondershausen
13 November 1918	Prince Friedrich	Principality of Waldeck and Pyrmont
10 November 1918	Prince Heinrich XXIV	Principality of Reuss-Greiz
11 November 1918	Prince Heinrich XXVII	Principality of Reuss-Gera

=== Imperial statement of abdication (1918) ===
I herewith renounce for all time claims to the throne of Prussia and to the German Imperial throne connected therewith.

At the same time I release all officials of the German Empire and of Prussia, as well as all officers, non-commissioned officers and men of the navy and of the Prussian army, as well as the troops of the federated states of Germany, from the oath of fidelity which they tendered to me as their Emperor, King and Commander-in-Chief. I expect of them that until the re-establishment of order in the German Empire they shall render assistance to those in actual power in Germany, in protecting the German people from the threatening dangers of anarchy, famine, and foreign rule. Proclaimed under our own hand and with the imperial seal attached. Amerongen, 28 November 1918. Signed WILLIAM.

== See also ==
- Former German nobility in the Nazi Party
- German Emperor
- History of Germany
- History of Prussia
- Hohenzollern Castle
- Crown of Wilhelm II
- King in Prussia
- List of German monarchs
- Year of the Three Emperors
- List of monarchs of Prussia
- List of rulers of Saxony
- List of rulers of Württemberg
- Family tree of German monarchs

== Sources ==
- Chisholm, Hugh, ed. (1911). "William II. of Germany" . Encyclopædia Britannica. Vol. 28 (11th ed.). Cambridge University Press. pp. 667–669.
