= Federal prince =

Federal prince (German: Bundesfürsten, "Princes of the Federation") was the generic term for the royal heads of state (monarchs) of the various states making up the German Empire, with the exception of the states that were republics and Alsace-Lorraine which had a special status. The empire was a federal state, with its constituent states remaining sovereign states. Among the states, the majority were monarchies, 3 states were republics and Alsace-Lorraine was an imperial territory ruled by a steward. The states became part of the German Empire by an 1871 treaty. The head of the empire was granted the title German Emperor (with the title "Emperor of Germany" being deliberately avoided), and was simultaneously a federal prince as King of Prussia, the sovereign of its largest federal state. Of the princely heads of state, 4 held the title King (König) (the Kings of Prussia, Bavaria, Saxony, and Württemberg), 6 held the title Grand Duke (Großherzog), 5 held the title Duke (Herzog), and 7 held the title Prince (i.e. Sovereign Prince, Fürst). The heads of state of the city republics, where the concepts of nobility and royalty did not exist, were of equal standing to the federal princes and held the titles First Mayor and President of the Senate (Hamburg), Mayor and President of the Senate (Lübeck), and President of the Senate and Mayor (Bremen). The heads of state of the city republics were regarded as primi inter pares among the senators according to the states' republican constitutions, and these states were ruled by an oligarchy of hereditary Grand Burghers, also known as Hanseaten or patricians.

In total, there were 22 federal princes of the German Empire and additionally three republican heads of state and the steward of Alsace-Lorraine.

The relationship between the German Emperor and the (other) federal princes soured quickly following William II's accession to the throne. Many federal princes felt William II treated them as mere vassals, when they were indeed sovereign monarchs of states that voluntarily had entered a federal monarchy. Both for this reason and because of their personal dislike of the Emperor, the federal princes tended to avoid the imperial court in Berlin.

== See also ==
- List of German monarchs in 1918

== Literature ==
- Ingeborg Koch, Die Bundesfürsten und die Reichspolitik in der Zeit Wilhelms II., 1961
- Alexander Nöldeke, Die Steuerfreiheit der Bundesfürsten im Deutschen Reich, 1914
