= Wilhelm Reinhard (SS officer) =

German general and Nazi (1869–1955)

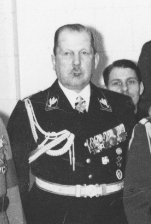
- Reinhard in February 1939

Bundesführer, Kyffhäuserbund (Reichsführer from 18 March 1938)
- In office 27 January 1934 – March 1943
- Preceded by: Düring
- Succeeded by: Office abolished

Chairman, Kyffhäuserbund (refounded)
- In office September 1952 – 18 January 1955
- Preceded by: Office re-established
- Succeeded by: Otto Drescher

Personal details
- Born: 18 March 1869 Forsthaus Lutau, Kingdom of Prussia, German Empire
- Died: 18 January 1955 (aged 85) Dortmund, West Germany

Military service
- Allegiance: German Empire; Weimar Republic; Nazi Germany
- Branch/service: Prussian Army; Freikorps; Reichswehr; German Army
- Years of service: 1888–1919; 1935–1945
- Rank: Oberst; General der Infanterie
- Commands: 5th Guards Grenadiers; 4th Foot Guards; Freikorps Reinhard; 15th Infantry Brigade, (Reichswehr)
- Battles/wars: World War I; Masurian Lakes; Łódź; Third Battle of Artois; Spartacist uprising; Berlin March Battles
- Awards: Pour le Mérite, with oakleaves Iron Cross, 1st and 2nd class War Merit Cross, 1st and 2nd class

Wilhelm Reinhard (18 March 1869 – 18 January 1955) was a German long-serving professional military officer in the Royal Prussian Army, the Reichswehr and the Wehrmacht. A member of the Nazi Party, he became a General der Infanterie, an SS-Obergruppenführer and a member of the Reichstag. Between 1934 and 1943, he was the leader of the Kyffhäuserbund, the major veterans' organization in Nazi Germany that was outlawed in 1945 after the end of World War II. He refounded the organization in West Germany and led it until his death.

== Early life and military career ==
Reinhard was born the son of a minor Prussian official, the Forstmeister (forest master) in Forsthaus Lutau, in the Flatow district of West Prussia. After completing secondary school, he became a cadet at the military academies at Culm (today, Chełmno) and Lichterfelde, and then attended the War School at Metz. In 1888, he entered the Royal Prussian Army with the 78th (East Frisian) Infantry Regiment as a Fähnrich and, in 1889, was promoted to Leutnant and became a battalion and regimental adjutant. In January 1901, he was made adjutant of the 38th Infantry Brigade. In 1903, he was promoted to Hauptmann and, in April 1904, became a company commander in the 33rd (East Prussian) Fusilier Regiment in Gumbinnen (today, Gusev, Kaliningrad Oblast). From 1907, Reinhard was commander of the 7th Company of the 163rd (Schleswig-Holstein) Infantry in Neumünster. Promoted to Major in April 1911, he was transferred to the 5th Foot Guards Regiment in Spandau as a staff officer. After serving there for almost two years, he was appointed a battalion commander in March 1913.

== First World War ==
At the outbreak of the First World War in 1914, Reinhard led his battalion into Belgium on the western front where it participated in the siege and capture of the fortress of Namur. Transferred to the eastern front, he fought in the battles of the Masurian Lakes and Łódź. From January to June 1915, Reinhard commanded the 5th Guards Grenadiers Regiment and was subsequently appointed commander of the 4th Foot Guards Regiment. Reinhard's regiment was transferred back to the western front in the autumn of 1915 and fought in the Third Battle of Artois. In addition to his front line combat command experience, he also served on the Great General Staff. He was promoted to Oberstleutnant in April 1916, and to Oberst in September 1918. During the course of the war, he was awarded the Pour le Mérite with oak leaves, the Iron Cross, 1st and 2nd class and the House Order of Hohenzollern.

== Post-war Freikorps and Reichswehr service ==
Returning to Berlin after the end of the war in November 1918, Reinhard in December established a Freikorps unit named after him (Freiwilligen-Regiment Reinhard). On 24 December 1918, he assumed the duties of the Commandant of Berlin. Under his leadership, the Spartacist uprising was crushed in January 1919. During the Berlin March Battles two months later, there were renewed armed clashes in which approximately 1,200 people were killed, most of them insurgents. In June 1919, the "Freikorps Reinhard" was incorporated into the provisional Reichswehr and Reinhard was appointed commander of the 15th Infantry Brigade in Berlin. After the Weimar Constitution went into effect in August 1919, members of the military were required to pledge an oath of allegiance to defend the new republic in front of the new Black-Red-Gold Flag. Reinhard refused to take the oath and former chancellor Philipp Scheidemann called for him to be dismissed from the army. The minister of defense Gustav Noske and the chief of the army high command, General Walther Reinhardt, sought to negotiate a compromise that would allow him to remain in the Reichswehr but Reinhard was retired from active military service in December 1919.

== Political and SS career in Nazi Germany ==
During the Weimar Republic, Reinhard worked as a businessman. In October 1927, he joined the Nazi Party (membership number 63,074). As an early Party member, he later would be awarded the Golden Party Badge. Reinhard also was a member of the Sturmabteilung (SA), the Nazi Party paramilitary organization, where he attained the rank of SA-Standartenführer. He was appointed SA-Oberstlandesführer of the SA Reserve II (SAR-II) in December 1933. The SAR-II was made up of SA personnel over the age of 45 and included members of the war veterans groups Der Stahlhelm and Kyffhäuserbund.

When the SAR-II was disbanded, Reinhard left the SA. On 15 September 1935, he transferred from the SA into the SS (SS number 274,104) with the rank of SS-Standartenführer. He was a member of the personal staff of Reichsführer-SS Heinrich Himmler from 1938 and was promoted to the rank of SS-Obergruppenführer on 9 November 1941. His role was primarily ceremonial and administrative, reflecting the Nazi regime's strategy of incorporating traditional military figures to lend legitimacy to its structures. He did not hold active command or operational responsibility in the SS.

At the March 1936 parliamentary election, Reinhard was elected as a deputy to the Reichstag from the Nazi Party electoral list and remained a Reichstag deputy until the fall of the Nazi regime in May 1945.

== Leadership of the Kyffhäuserbund ==
Reinhard was active in the Kyffhäuserbund, the largest veterans' organization in Germany at the time. On 27 January 1934, Reich President Paul von Hindenburg appointed Reinhard the Bundesführer (federal leader) of this organization. Under his leadership, the organization aligned more closely with Nazi ideology and was renamed the Nationalsozialistischer Reichskriegerbund Kyffhäuser (NSRKB) on 18 March 1938, and Reinhard was given the title of Reichsführer of the NSRKB. Reinhard played a largely symbolic role in promoting veterans' affairs and representing the historical military tradition of the German Empire. Documents and ceremonial certificates from the 1930s bear his signature in this capacity. Reinhard held this position until the NSRKB was dissolved by the Nazi regime in March 1943 in a wartime reorganization.

On 22 March 1938, on the occasion of Reinhard's 50-year anniversary of entering the military, Adolf Hitler awarded him the brevet rank of Generalmajor in the Wehrmacht. A year later, on 18 March 1939, to mark his 70th birthday, Hitler promoted Reinhard to brevet General der Infanterie. He did not hold an active military command in the Second World War but was awarded the War Merit Cross, 1st and 2nd class.

== Post-war life ==
After the war, Reinhard was interned by the Western Allies for several months and, after his release, lived with a nephew in the Opmünden district of Bad Sassendorf. The Kyffhäuserbund had been declared an illegal organization on 10 October 1945 by Law No. 2 of the Allied Control Council. After the establishment of West Germany, Reinhard worked to reestablish the Kyffhäuserbund as a non-political veterans' group. In September 1952, he officially refounded the organization in Dortmund and led it until his death in Dortmund on 18 January 1955 at the age of 85.

== Ranks ==
Army and SS Ranks
Date	Rank
22 March 1888	Fähnrich (Brevet)
15 October 1888	Fähnrich
21 September 1889	Leutnant
18 August 1897	Oberleutnant
18 April 1903	Hauptmann
21 April 1911	Major
18 April 1916	Oberstleutnant
21 September 1918	Oberst
15 September 1935	SS-Standartenführer
9 November 1935	SS-Oberführer
9 November 1936	SS-Brigadeführer
20 April 1937	SS-Gruppenführer
22 March 1938	Generalmajor (brevet)
18 March 1939	General der Infanterie (brevet)
9 November 1941	SS-Obergruppenführer

== Publications ==
- 1918/1919: Die Wehen der Republic (1932), Brunnen-Verlag, Berlin

== Sources ==
- Campbell, Bruce (1998). The SA Generals and the Rise of Nazism. Lexington: University Press of Kentucky. ISBN 978-0-813-12047-8.
- Klee, Ernst (2007). Das Personenlexikon zum Dritten Reich. Wer war was vor und nach 1945. Frankfurt-am-Main: Fischer-Taschenbuch-Verlag. ISBN 978-3-596-16048-8.
- Lepage, Jean-Denis (2016). Hitler's Stormtroopers: The SA, The Nazi's Brownshirts, 1922–1945. Frontline Books. ISBN 978-1-399-07721-7.
- Mulligan, William (2004). The Creation of the Modern German Army: General Walther Reinhardt and the Weimar Republic, 1914-1930. Berghahn Books. ISBN 978-1-571-81908-6.
- Reinhard, Wilhelm entry in the Files of the Reich Chancellery
- Schiffer Publishing Ltd., ed. (2000). SS Officers List: SS-Standartenführer to SS-Oberstgruppenführer (As of 30 January 1942). Schiffer Military History Publishing. ISBN 0-7643-1061-5.
- Williams, Max (2018). SS Elite: The Senior Leaders of Hitler's Praetorian Guard. Vol. 3. Fonthill Media LLC. ISBN 978-1-781-55638-2.
