= Volksmarinedivision =

Revolutionary German military unit (1918–1919)

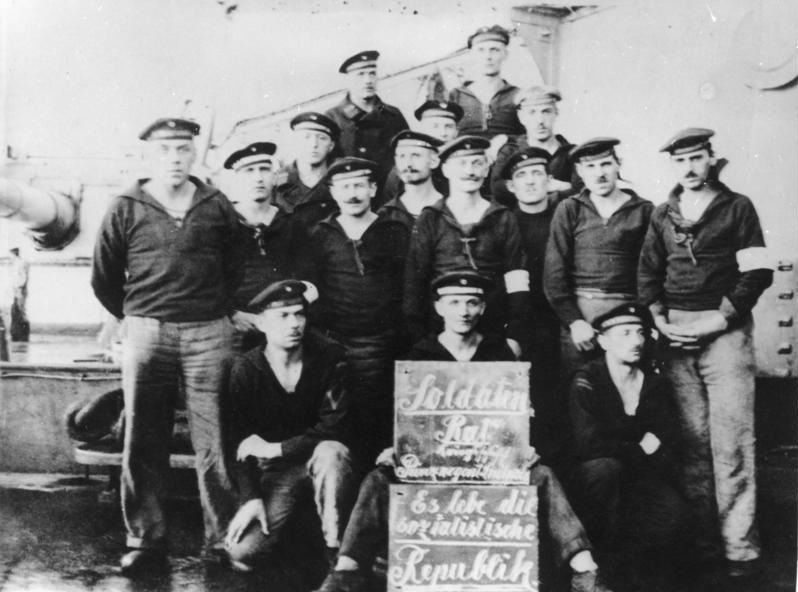
Sailors' uprising, November 1918. The sign reads: "Soldiers' council. Long live the socialist republic."

The Volksmarinedivision (People's Navy Division) was an armed unit formed on 11 November 1918 during the November Revolution that broke out in Germany following its defeat in World War I. At its peak late that month, the People's Navy Division had about 3,200 members.

In the struggles between the various elements involved in the revolution to determine Germany's future form of government, it initially supported the moderate socialist interim government of Friedrich Ebert and the Council of the People's Deputies. By December of 1918 it had turned more to the left and was involved in skirmishes against government troops such as the Christmas crisis. In March 1919, after the success of the Ebert government in the elections to the National Assembly that drew up the Weimar Constitution, the People's Navy Division was disbanded and 30 of its members were summarily shot by members of a Freikorps unit.

== Structure ==
The People's Navy Division initially comprised about 600 men, rising to 1,500 by 13 November and 3,200 by the end of the month, but then dropping to 1,800 by December. Although most of its members were nonpartisan sailors, it included members of the Social Democratic Party (SPD), its more leftist offshoot the Independent Social Democratic Party (USPD), along with Communists and Spartacists, members of a Marxist revolutionary movement organized during World War I.

During its most active period, the People's Navy Division was divided into three sections. The First Section, with 1,550 men, was based in the Imperial Stables in Berlin and had as its main responsibility guarding the Reich Chancellery, the Reichsbank, Museum Island and the Ullstein publishing house.

Section II with 800 men was initially based in the Berlin Palace, later in a public establishment on Kistenmacher Street and then in the Prussian House of Representatives. This detachment was responsible for guarding the House of Representatives and Prussian House of Lords.

Section III consisted for the most part of sailors from Cuxhaven and reached a strength of 900 men. It was located at the Lehrter train station in Berlin. Besides guarding the train stations, it provided standby and patrol duty.

The administrative department of the People's Navy Division, with 100 men, had its headquarters first in the Imperial Stables, later in the Marinehaus. Its tasks included seeing to supplies and provisioning.

== History ==
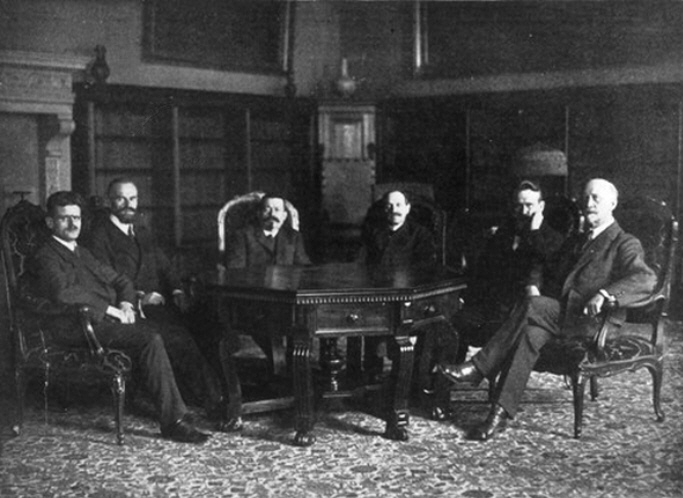
Council of the People's Deputies. Left to right: Emil Barth (USPD), Otto Landsberg (SPD), Friedrich Ebert, Hugo Haase (USPD), Wilhelm Dittmann (USPD), Philipp Scheidemann (SPD)

On 10 November 1918 Berlin factory workers and regiments stationed in and around the city elected workers' and soldiers' councils. One of these, the People's Marine Council of Greater Berlin, established the People's Navy Division on 11 November at the suggestion of Chief Petty Officer Paul Wieczorek, one of the leaders of the 3 November Kiel Mutiny that had triggered the November Revolution. Revolutionary sailors of the former Imperial German Navy were to be placed at the disposal of Berlin's new police president, Emil Eichhorn. Wieczorek was elected the first commander.

On 14 November 1918 Wieczorek was shot and killed by Captain Friedrich Brettschneider, who tried to take over leadership of the People's Navy Division but was himself killed shortly afterwards. A few hours later, seaman Otto Tost from Cuxhaven was elected the new commander.

=== Early actions ===
Initially the People's Navy Division was on the side of a moderate social democracy. On 6 December 1918 sailors of the troop under the command of First Lieutenant of the Reserve Hermann von Wolff-Metternich, along with other military units, marched to the Reich Chancellery and publicly expressed their support for Chancellor Friedrich Ebert, who was head of the Council of the People's Deputies, the de facto German government during the November Revolution. The troops also demanded elections to the National Assembly before the end of December and criticized the Executive Council of the Workers' and Soldiers' Councils of Greater Berlin. The sailors offered Ebert the office of president, but he dismissed the idea. The troops then withdrew and searched the editorial office of the Rote Fahne (Red Flag), the newspaper of the Spartacus League. Other troops not from the People's Navy Division arrested the Executive Council, leading to violent confrontations.

The plans to have the troops proclaim Ebert head of state with dictatorial powers had come from Hans von Haeften, a colonel in the Supreme Army Command. The aim of his counter-revolutionary action was to eliminate the workers' and soldiers' councils and restore the officers' power of command. Haeften discussed this with ministerial director Ferdinand von Stumm, who suggested that the People's Navy Division, led by his kinsman Wolff-Metternich, be allowed to head the enterprise. The plan was never carried out.

=== Turn to the left ===
In the following weeks the troops began to orient themselves more to the left. On 30 December 1918 a detachment guarded the Prussian House of Representatives in Berlin where the founding conference of the German Communist Party (KPD) was taking place.

The Division increasingly roused the displeasure of political leaders. On 12 December Finance Minister Hugo Simon accused the troops of thefts of considerable value from the Berlin Palace where they were quartered. After the arrival of Guard troops, the military in particular pressed for the Division to be disbanded. Otto Wels, the military commander of Berlin, planned to incorporate its reliable sections into the Reichswehr and to dismiss the rest after giving them severance pay, but the troops rejected his plan. He then ordered them to vacate the Palace by 16 December in an ultimatum to which they did not respond.

On 17 December Heinrich Dorrenbach, an influential member of the Division's central committee, succeeded in pushing a resolution through the Soldiers' Councils of Greater Berlin. Under its terms the councils were to hold the power of command over army units, all rank insignia were to be abolished, and all officers dismissed. A delegation from the People's Navy Division invaded the session of the Reich Congress of Workers' and Soldiers' Councils and demanded an immediate decision on the resolution. After a violent tumult, Hugo Haase, co-chair of the Council of the People's Deputies, succeeded in adjourning the meeting until the next day. Under pressure from the Soldiers' Councils, what came to be called the 'Hamburg Points', which were very close to the demands of the People's Navy Division, were adopted on 18 December.

=== Christmas crisis ===
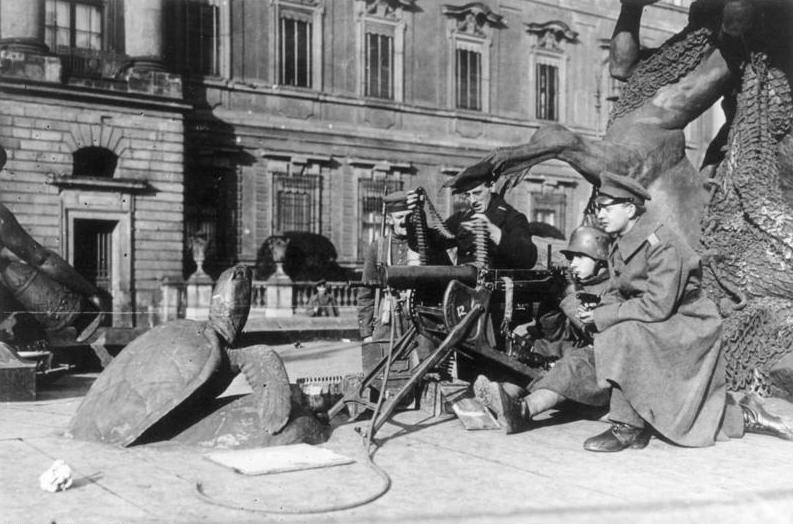
Machine gun unit of the Volksmarinedivision by the Neptune Fountain, in front of the Berlin Palace

The refusal of the People's Navy Division to leave their quarters without the outstanding pay due them led to the Christmas crisis (German: Weihnachtskämpfe, 'Christmas battles') on 23 and 24 December 1918. The Division held Otto Wels hostage, detained the government and took control of the Reich Chancellery telephone exchange. Ebert saw no other option than to ask the army for support under the Ebert–Groener Pact, a secret 10 November agreement in which Wilhelm Groener, Quartermaster General of the German Army had assured Ebert of the Army's loyalty, in return for which Ebert had promised, among other things, to take prompt action against leftist uprisings. Regular troops under the command of General Arnold Lequis advanced against the People's Navy Division but were unable to storm the Palace because armed workers and other revolutionary units were supporting them. After 56 government soldiers and civilians were killed, Ebert gave the order to stop the fighting. The government had to make significant concessions to the People's Navy Division. It was allowed to remain whole, was absorbed intact into the Republican Soldiers' Army and received the outstanding pay it was due. Politically, the skirmish led to the breakup of the USPD-SPD coalition when the three USPD members of the Council of the People's Deputies resigned in protest of the actions taken by Ebert and the SPD.

=== Spartacist uprising and the Berlin March Battles ===
During the communist led Spartacist uprising of January 1919, the troops were on the side of the radical left in spite of their incorporation into the Republican Soldiers' Army. The Division's commander, Dorrenbach, played a decisive role in the decision to begin the fight by claiming that not only the People's Navy Division but all troops in Berlin were behind the Revolutionary Stewards and were prepared to use force against the government of Ebert and Philipp Scheidemann. The pressure from the troops was one of the triggers that prompted Karl Liebknecht, founder of the Communist Party of Germany, and others who were present to not only protest against the dismissal of Police President Emil Eichhorn for refusing to use his forces against the People's Navy Division during the skirmish at the Palace, but also to aim for the overthrow of the government. The attempt quickly failed.

On 5 March 1919, during the Berlin March Battles, the remnants of the People's Navy Division were ordered to relieve the government troops beleaguered inside the police headquarters. The government troops took the Division for enemies and opened fire. The sailors fired back and joined the insurgents. The government troops responded aggressively and defeated the insurgents.

=== Disbandment and decimation ===
The unit was disbanded in March 1919. When its members came to pick up their discharge papers and back pay, Otto Marloh of the Reinhard Freikorps regiment, whose commander claimed to be acting under the general orders of Reich Defense Minister Gustav Noske, selected out every tenth man and had him shot. Although most of the 30 thus chosen died, at least one escaped to relate the story. Marloh was later acquitted of the killings, while his superiors who had ordered the massacre were never tried.

== Memorialization in East Germany ==
The naval forces of the German Democratic Republic (East Germany) were named the People's Navy (Volksmarine) of the GDR after the Volksmarinedivision. Some units and ships were named after well-known members of the People's Navy Division.

== Commanders of the People's Navy Division ==
- Paul Wieczorek (11 November – 13 November 1918)
- Otto Tost (13 November – 23 November 1918)
- Graf Hermann Wolff-Metternich (23 November 1918 –7 December 1918)
- Fritz Radtke (8 December 1918 – 8 January 1919)
- Walter Junge and Markus Markiewicz (8 January – 11 March 1919)
