= Majority Social Democratic Party of Germany =

Name of the main German Social Democratic Party 1917–1922

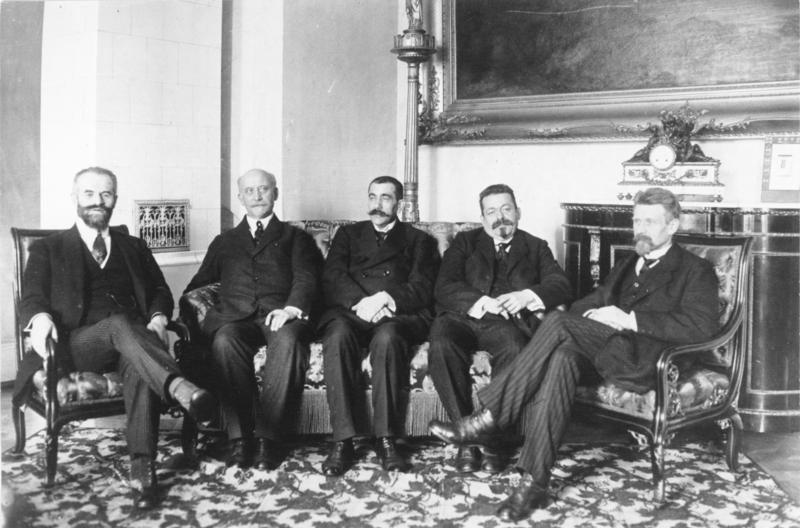
The Council of the People's Deputies in 1919 when all members were from the MSPD. Left to right: Otto Landsberg, Philipp Scheidemann, Gustav Noske, Friedrich Ebert, Rudolf Wissell

The Majority Social Democratic Party of Germany (German: Mehrheitssozialdemokratische Partei Deutschlands, MSPD) was the name officially used by the Social Democratic Party of Germany (SPD) between April 1917 and September 1922. The name differentiated it from the Independent Social Democratic Party (Unabhängige Sozialdemokratische Partei Deutschlands, USPD), which split from the SPD as a result of the party majority's support of the government during the First World War.

Governments led by the MSPD steered Germany through the German Revolution of 1918–1919 and the first years of the Weimar Republic. They followed a moderate course towards a parliamentary system and often used military force against the radical left groups that wanted a soviet style government. The MSPD introduced important social reforms such as the eight-hour workday and early forms of unemployment and health insurance. The party won more votes than any other in the first two national elections.

The breakaway USPD was considerably weakened after the Spartacus League, its revolutionary wing, joined with other communist groups to form the Communist Party of Germany in January 1919. In 1922 the majority of the remaining USPD members united with the MSPD, and the party returned to its original SPD name.

== Historical and theoretical development ==
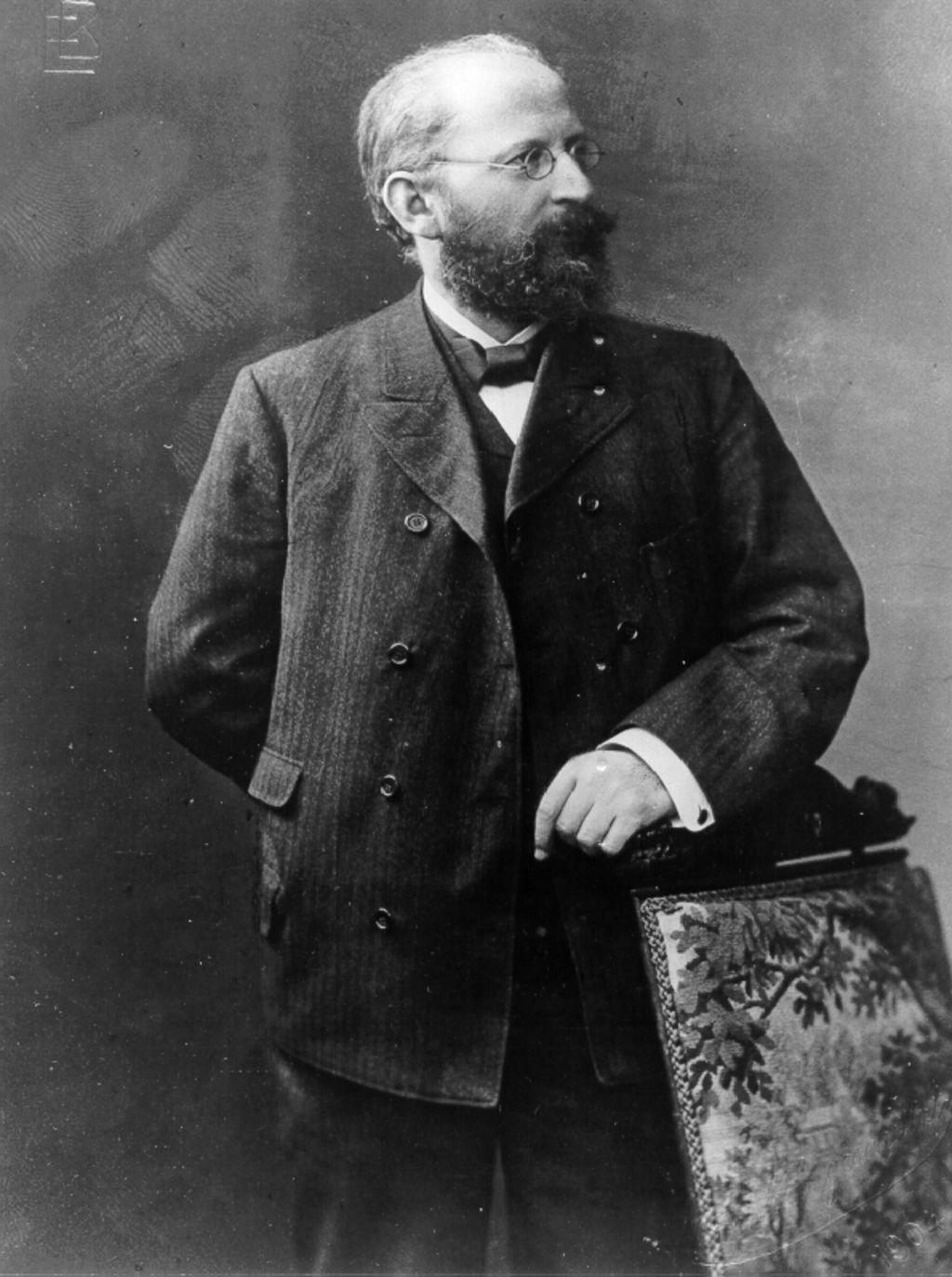
Eduard Bernstein, who began the reformist movement within the SPD, in 1895

Significant disputes over the direction of the Social Democratic Party of Germany (SPD) began with the revisionist debate triggered by Eduard Bernstein. He and his supporters sought to achieve socialism not through revolution, the original goal of the SPD, but through reforms and democratic majorities legitimised in general elections. The reformist wing of the party – or "revisionist" in the party's internal parlance at the time – gradually gained acceptance within the SPD. By the time of the repeal of the Bismarckian Anti-Socialist Laws in 1890, the majority of the party in its practical politics had come to accept and support parliamentarism. After the death in 1913 of party chairman August Bebel, who had stood as a figure who could integrate the party's two wings, Friedrich Ebert was elected to the leadership of the party. His was a clearly moderate voice that continued to champion the reformist course.

Internal party differences between the anti-reformists and reformists were exacerbated by the outbreak of the First World War, in particular the issue of Burgfriedenspolitik, an agreement among the parties in the Reichstag that subordinated party interests to war policy and national interest. The trade unions refrained from striking, all parties supported war credits and agreed not to criticize the government and its handling of the war. The majority of the SPD Reichstag party membership under the leadership of Ebert and Hugo Haase, who later moved to the Independent Social Democratic Party (USPD), supported Burgfriedenspolitik and the war policy of the German Empire.

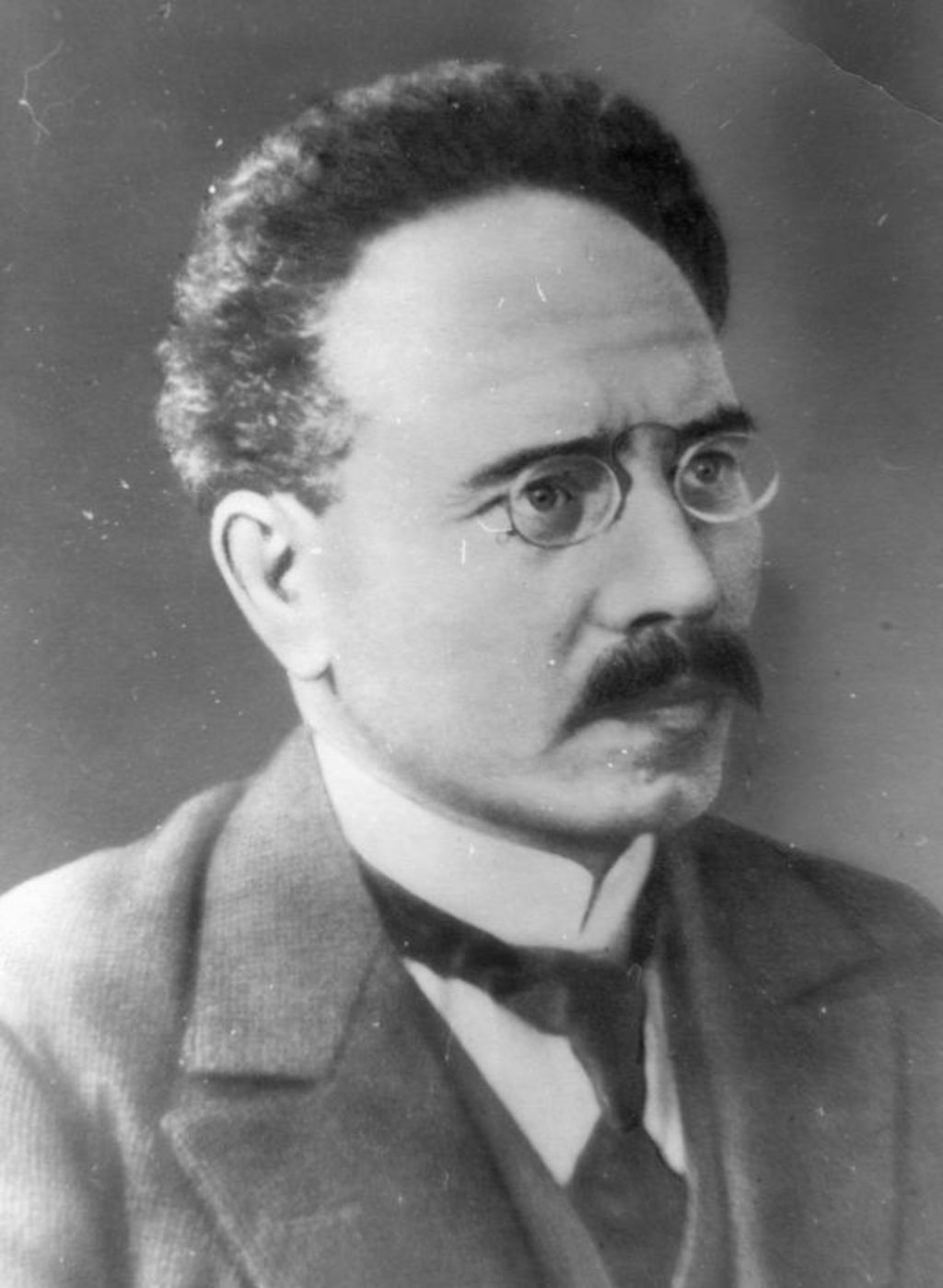
Karl Liebknecht of the SPD, a leading anti-war figure, shown here in 1912

At the end of 1914, Karl Liebknecht of the SPD was the first member of the Reichstag to vote against war credits. He was expelled from the party in 1916 for his opposition to its leadership. The SPD's left-wing revolutionary International Group, which was founded by Rosa Luxemburg and renamed the Spartacus Group in 1916 and the Spartacus League in 1918, had also agitated against the war from the outset.

Over time, the deadlocked course of the war, with tens of thousands of fallen soldiers and growing hardship among the German population, led to increasing doubts about its justifications among both the general population and in the ranks of the Social Democrats. By 1915/1916, members of the Marxist wing and moderate leftists and reformists such as Hugo Haase and Eduard Bernstein opposed the war. In 1917 the anti-war faction within the party had grown to 45 members. In March the majority of the SPD parliamentary membership, led by Ebert and Philipp Scheidemann, voted to expel the opponents of the war. At a conference from 6–8 April 1917 in Gotha, the former members founded the USPD, with the Spartacus group around Luxemburg, Liebknecht and Clara Zetkin as its left wing. To distinguish itself from the USPD, the remaining part of the SPD was renamed the Majority SPD, or MSPD.

== After the split ==
Karl Kautsky, the long-time editor of the journal Die Neue Zeit, and leading theorists of the reform wing also moved to the USPD. In the remaining Majority SPD, the former left-wing anti-revisionists of the Lensch-Cunow-Haenisch group, who were close to the German-Russian journalist Alexander Parvus, influenced the theoretical debates instead of Kautsky and Bernstein from 1915 onwards. Their aim was to utilise the hoped-for German victory in the First World War to implement a socialist order in Europe and liberate the peoples of Eastern Europe from the "yoke of tsarism".

In June 1917, the MSPD, Centre Party and Progressive People's Party formed a Reichstag Intergroup Committee (Interfraktioneller Ausschuss) in a tentative step towards the parliamentarization of the German Empire. Its primary achievement was the German constitutional reforms of October 1918, which made the chancellor responsible to the Reichstag rather than to the emperor and required parliamentary approval for declarations of war and peace. Since the reforms were adopted only on 28 October 1918, they were quickly overtaken by the collapse of the Empire at the end of World War I.

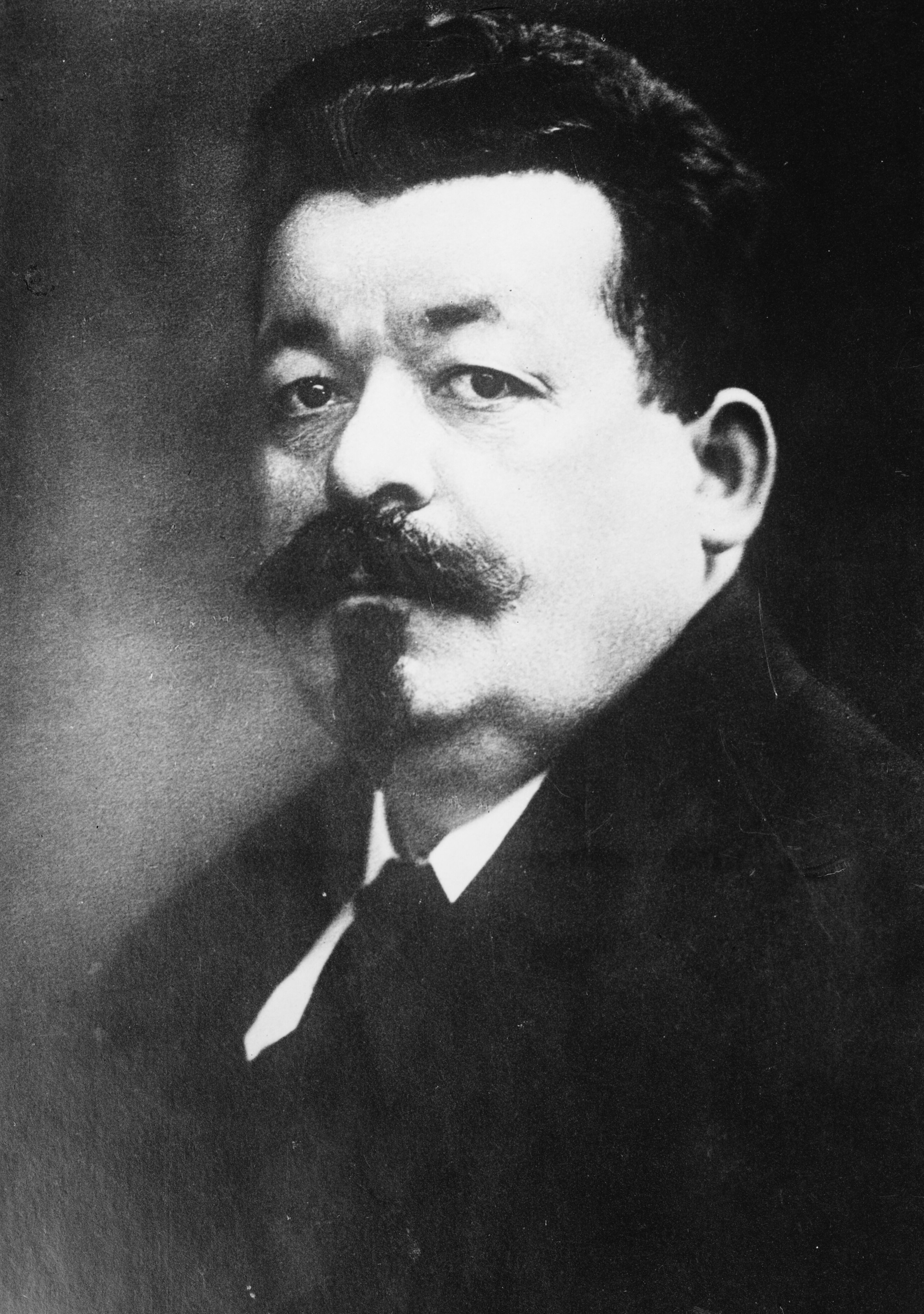
Friedrich Ebert, leader of the MSPD and republican Germany's first president, in 1918

On 9 September 1918, in the early days of the German Revolution of 1918–1919 that followed Germany's defeat, Prince Maximilian von Baden, the last chancellor of the German Empire, handed the government over to Friedrich Ebert as head of the party with the largest number of seats in the Reichstag. Initially the party yielded more to the pressure of events than act on specific plans to run a revolutionary government. Ebert's early considerations to refrain from abolishing the monarchy in order to prevent a civil war, for example, proved illusory.

The Spartacus League and parts of the USPD advocated the formation of a soviet republic such as the one proclaimed a year earlier during the October Revolution in Russia. Only a minority of the active revolutionary soldiers' and workers' councils who supported the revolution, however, had the example of the Russian Bolsheviks in mind. The majority of them were striving primarily for an end to the war and military rule. With that goal in mind, they backed the MSPD leadership, whom they trusted, and called for the reunification of the Majority SPD with the Independent SPD. The MSPD leadership then offered to form a Council of the People's Deputies with the USPD as the new government. The resulting revolutionary government, with three members each from the MSPD and USPD under the leadership of Ebert and Haase, saw itself as a provisional government for the revolutionary upheaval phase and committed itself to a constituent body that would be created through general elections.

At the end of 1918, the coalition between the MSPD and USPD collapsed due to a dispute about the use of the military against the rebellious sailors of the People's Navy Division (Volksmarinedivision) during the Christmas crisis. The MSPD, which from that point on formed the government alone, attempted unsuccessfully to establish a democratic people's army or to rely on MSPD volunteer organisations for armed support. When the Council of the People's Deputies was attacked during the Spartacist uprising in January 1919, they decided to trust to the troops led by the old imperial officers and leaders of the newly constituted Freikorps.

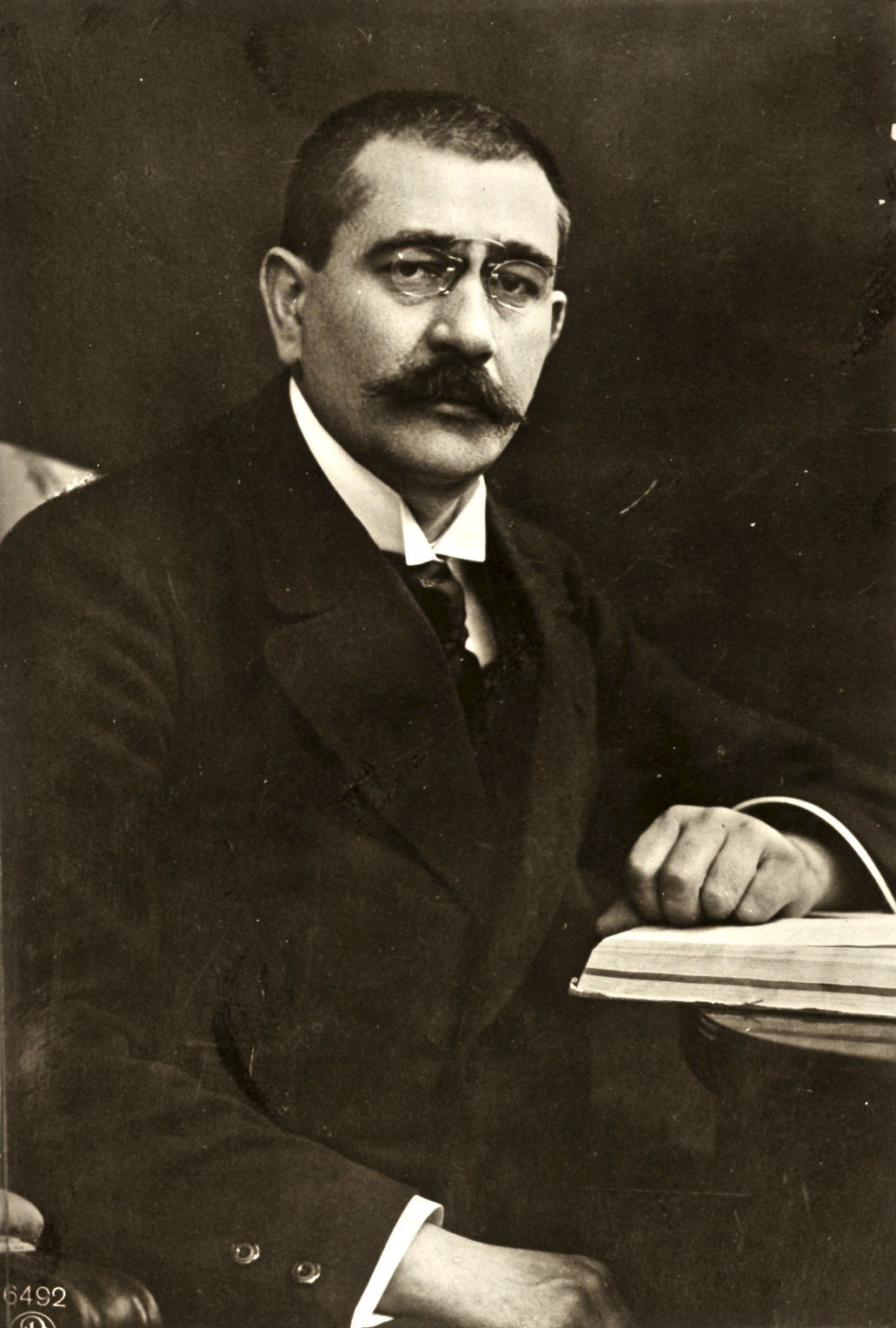
Gustav Noske, MSPD Reichswehr minister

The bloody suppression of the Spartacist uprising and the Bavarian Soviet Republic by right-wing nationalist Freikorps units recruited by Gustav Noske (MSPD) at the turn of the year 1918/19 left the MSPD in reasonably firm control by mid-1919. Noske, who later became the Weimar Republic's first Reichswehr minister, was politically responsible for the murders by Freikorps units of many revolutionaries, including Rosa Luxemburg and Karl Liebknecht on 15 January 1919.

The actions taken by Ebert, Noske and Scheidemann during the months of the November Revolution led to the accusation by both parliamentary and non-parliamentary left-wing parties and groups that the MSPD had betrayed the revolution and thus, to a large extent, its own supporters. The Spartacus League and other left-wing revolutionary groups founded the Communist Party of Germany (KPD) on 1 January 1919. It marked the final separation between the revolutionary and reformist wings of social democracy.

== Social reforms ==
The new government faced a social crisis in Germany following the end of the First World War, with the country threatened by hunger and chaos. The return of soldiers into civilian life was for the most part orderly, and efforts were made to combat the threat of starvation. The government of the Council of the People's Deputies raised wage levels and introduced universal proportional representation for both national and state parliaments. A series of regulations on unemployment benefits, job creation and protection, health insurance and pensions introduced important political and social reforms. In February 1918, workers had made an agreement with employers which secured them freedom of association, the legal guarantee of an eight-hour workday and the extension of wage agreements to all branches of trade and industry. The Council of the People's Deputies made the changes legally binding. In addition, the MSPD-steered provisional government introduced binding state arbitration of labour conflicts, created worker's councils in large industrial firms, and opened the path to the unionization of rural labourers. In December 1918, a decree was passed providing relief for the unemployed. Communities were to be responsible for 33% of unemployment relief (without fixing a monetary amount) and the national government would contribute 50%. Responsibility for job placement was first transferred from the Demobilization Office to the minister of Labour and then to the National Employment Exchange Office, which was created in January 1920.

== Election results ==
In the January 1919 election for the Weimar National Assembly, which was tasked with writing a new constitution, the MSPD captured 37.9% of the vote and 163 seats, almost twice as many as the second place finisher; the USPD gained 7.6% of the vote and 22 seats. The outcome of the 1920 election to the first Weimar Reichstag was quite different. The MSPD's share slipped to 21.9% and 103 seats, while the USPD's jumped to 17.6% and 83 seats, putting it in second place; the Communist Party of Germany received 2.1% of the vote and 4 seats. The MSPD's losses were due primarily to the effects of the government's handling of the Kapp Putsch and the ensuing Ruhr uprising. It had distanced itself from its initial call for a general strike to oppose the putsch because the move had angered the military on which it was relying, and the Ruhr uprising was harshly and bloodily suppressed by the military and Freikorps. Most of the voters the MSPD lost went to the USPD and KPD.

In the new republic's first presidential election in August 1919, Friedrich Ebert defeated Arthur von Posadowsky-Wehner of the conservative German National People's Party by 73% to 13%.

== Reunification with the USPD ==
In 1920, a little over half of the members of the USPD voted to join the KPD. The remnant of the USPD lost membership and money trying to steer a course between the KPD and MSPD. The assassination of Foreign Minister Walther Rathenau by members of the ultra-nationalist paramilitary Organisation Consul in June 1922 and the growth of the extreme Right led both the MSPD and the USPD to the view that saving the Republic was more important than their already shrinking political differences. The two parties' Reichstag memberships joined to form a working group on 14 July 1922, and at a united party congress in Nuremberg on 24 September, the parties reunited.
