= 1918 Christmas crisis =

Confrontation in Berlin during the German Revolution

- Part of the German Revolution of 1918–19
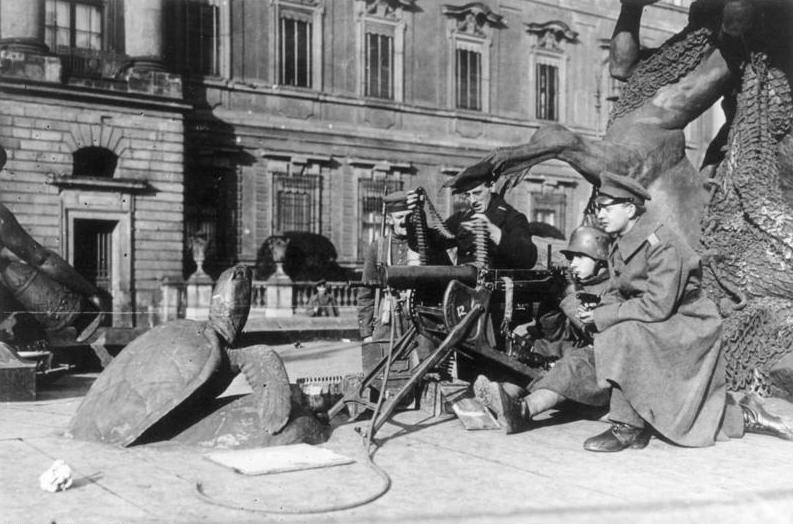
- Machine gun position of the Volksmarinedivision in front of the Neptune Fountain at the Berlin Palace, December 1918
Date	24 December 1918
Location	Berlin Palace
Result	Splitting of the left. Disaffection with SPD-led government. Growth of Freikorps.

Belligerents
Volksmarinedivision	German Army

Commanders and leaders
Unknown	(German Empire) Arnold Lequis

Strength
1,000	800

Casualties and losses
11 killed 23 wounded	56 killed 35 wounded

The 1918 Christmas crisis (German: Weihnachtskämpfe or Weihnachtsaufstand; lit. 'Christmas battles' or 'Christmas rebellion') was a brief battle between the socialist revolutionary Volksmarinedivision and regular German army units on 24 December 1918 during the German Revolution of 1918–19. It grew out of an attempt by the government to reduce the division's size and move it out of Berlin. The fighting, which took place at the Berlin Palace, cost 67 lives.

The event marked the point at which the hitherto largely bloodless revolution turned more violent. The fighting was the immediate cause for the more radical members to leave the revolutionary government and led to resentment among the workers against the Social Democratic government of Friedrich Ebert. This set the scene for the much larger-scale violence of January 1919 known as the Spartacist uprising. Since the revolutionary sailors defeated the regular army force sent against them, the engagement was also an important episode in the rise of the right-wing Freikorps on which the government increasingly relied.

== Background ==
On 11 November 1918, the Volksmarinedivision was created, initially numbering several hundred revolutionary naval troops from Kiel who had been arrested on arrival in Berlin but released on 9 November. They were joined by several hundred sailors from Berlin and another 2,000 requested from Kiel on 12 November by Stadtkommandant Otto Wels, the military commander of Berlin. Numbering more than 3,000 at its peak, the division was considered the elite force of the revolution. On 15 November, the division staff moved into the Berlin Palace, the former city residence of the Hohenzollern family and Emperor Wilhelm II, while the troops were billeted in the adjoining Marstall. Their task was to guard the government quarter. Politically, the division was close to the radical left, the Independent Social Democrats of the USPD and the "Spartacists".

However, having been the backbone of the revolution, over the next four weeks the unit found itself in a significantly different position. It is unclear whether this was due to the fact that it failed to cooperate with the military putsch planned for 6 December and had deposed its commander who was a part of it, or whether the division was an obstacle to Quartermaster General Wilhelm Groener's agreement to use the army to suppress any communist uprising.

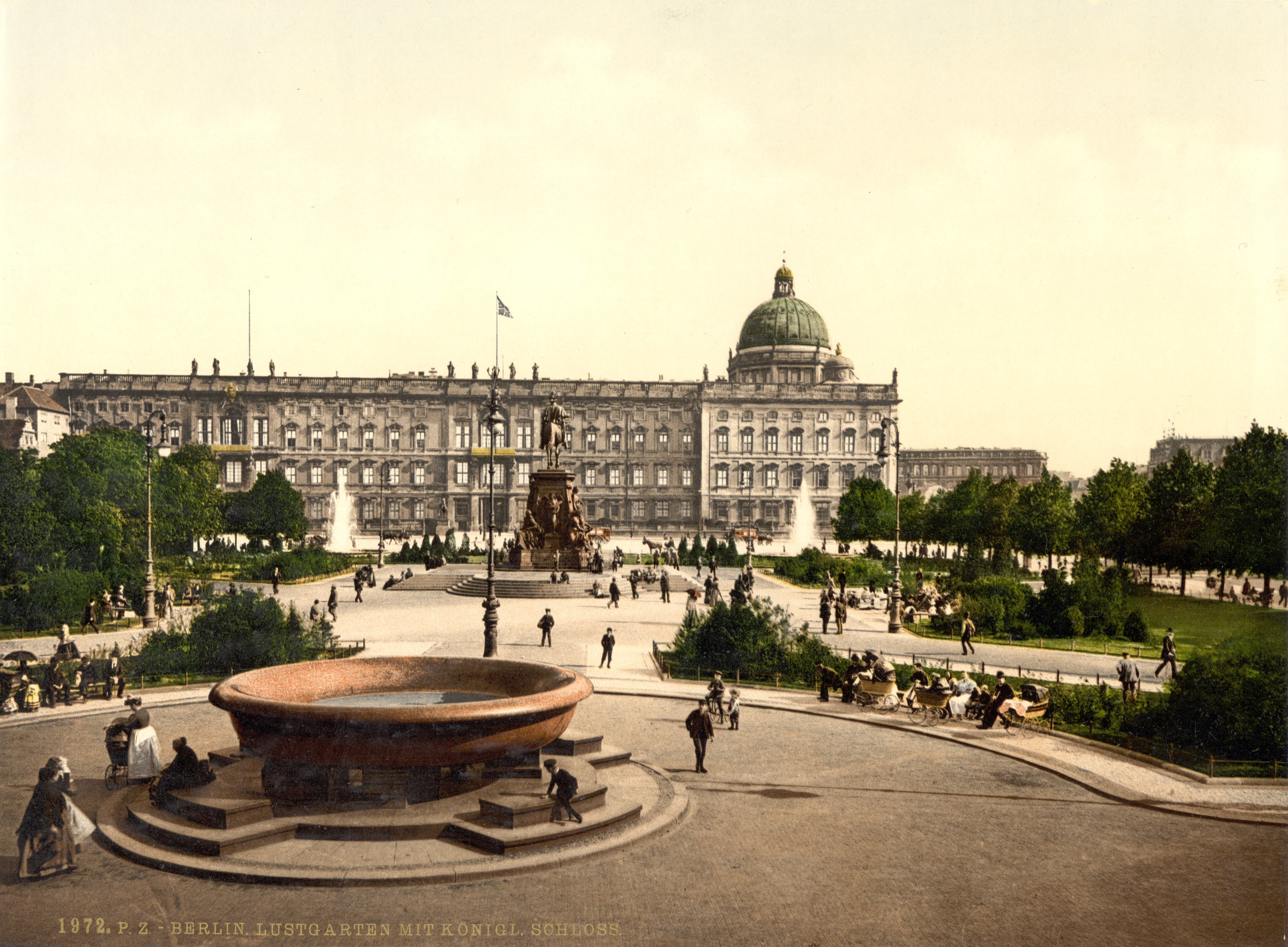
Berlin Palace on a postcard, between 1890 and 1900

From the middle of December, Wels seemed to be working towards the dissolution of the unit. There were complaints about art treasures having been stolen from the palace. The temporary government of the Rat der Volksbeauftragten (Council of People's Deputies) now ordered the division to move to new quarters outside of Berlin and to reduce the number of soldiers to 600 from the current level of around 1,000. To force them to comply, Wels held back their pay. During the week before Christmas the division and Wels negotiated in the Kommandantur, but failed to resolve the situation.

== 23 December 1918 ==
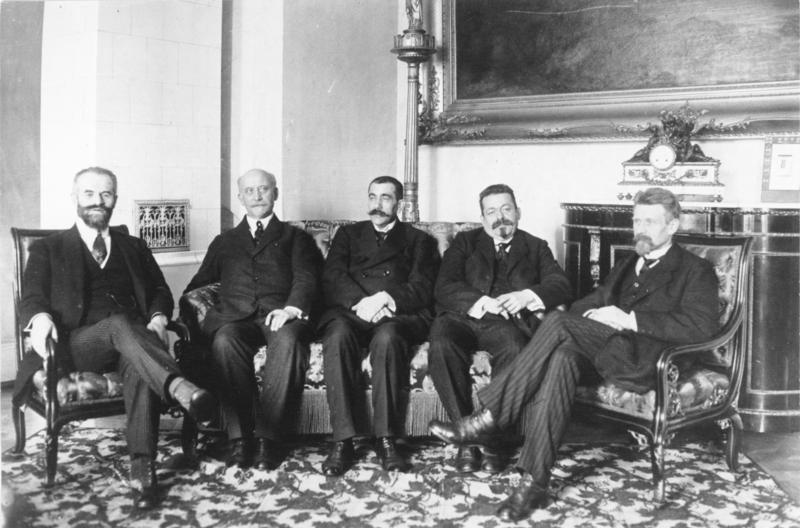
Council of the People's Deputies after 30 December 1918, when the USPD members were replaced. From left: Otto Landsberg, Philipp Scheidemann, Gustav Noske, Friedrich Ebert, Rudolf Wissell.

On 23 December, losing patience, the leaders of the division went to the Reichskanzlei (Chancellery). By that point, the government, the six-man "Council of People's Deputies" that had been in office since 10 November, was on the verge of breaking apart with increasing differences emerging between its USPD and MSPD members. The Volksmarinedivision encountered support from the former but mostly hostility from the latter. The soldiers were ordered to hand over the keys to the Palace and left. In the afternoon the soldiers' leaders returned, with the keys but also with a group of armed troops that took position in front of the building. According to author Sebastian Haffner what happened then was as follows: The soldiers' leaders under one Lieutenant Heinrich Dorrenbach gave the keys to Emil Barth, a People's Deputy of the USPD. Barth called Wels and told him that he had received the keys and asked him to hand over the outstanding pay. Wels refused, arguing that he only took orders from Friedrich Ebert who was joint chairman of the "Council of People's Deputies" and had also been handed the authority of government by the last Imperial Chancellor, Maximilian of Baden. When Barth sent the soldiers to Ebert, Ebert refused to see them. On Dorrenbach's orders the troops now closed all access to the Reichskanzlei, occupied the room with the telephone switchboard and cut the lines. The Volksbeauftragten were thus under house arrest.

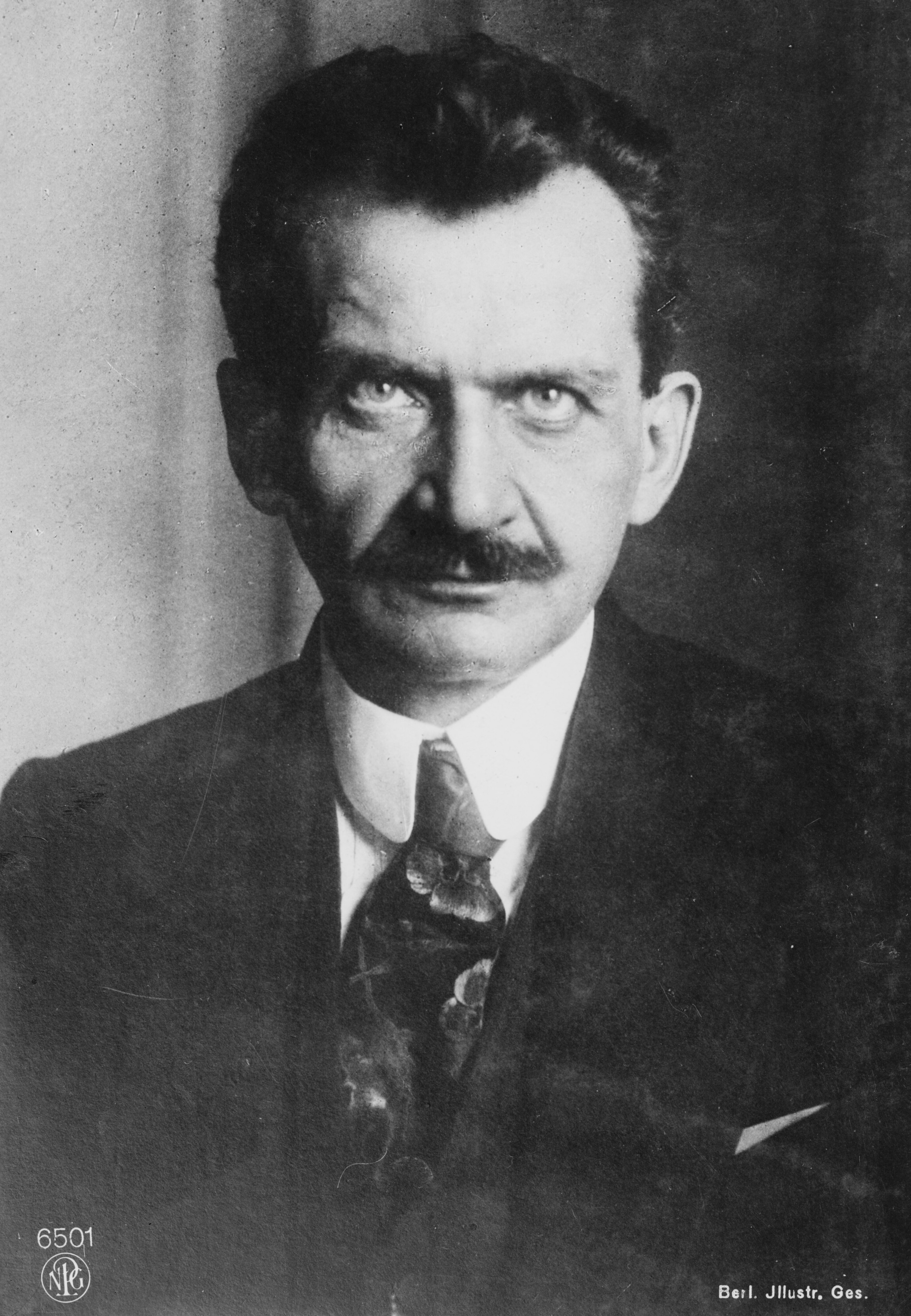
Otto Wels, at the time military commander of Berlin

Some of the soldiers then marched to the Kommandantur where the guards resisted. Three members of the Volksmarinedivision were killed. Otto Wels and two of his officers were abducted, brought to the nearby Marstall and physically abused. The soldiers also took their outstanding pay.

In response to the occupation of the Chancellery, Friedrich Ebert used a secret telephone line that did not go through the switchboard to call for help from the Oberste Heeresleitung (OHL), the High Command of the German Army, situated at that time in Kassel. This marked the first time that the Ebert–Groener pact of 10 November between Ebert and General Groener of the OHL was put into action. Ebert talked to Major Kurt von Schleicher, who promised to have loyal troops from the environs of Berlin come to Ebert's help. He also expressed his hope that this would be a chance to "finally strike a blow against the radicals". Regular troops from Potsdam and Babelsberg were mobilised and marched towards Berlin. They were the last remains of the ten divisions the government and OHL had originally brought to the capital to "restore law and order" between 10 and 15 December. Numbering just 800 men they nevertheless had some batteries of field artillery whilst the Volksmarinedivision had just side arms and machine guns.

There is some uncertainty about what happened during the remaining hours of 23 December; for example, whether the house arrest for the People's Deputies was cancelled. Between 5 and 7 pm there was a cabinet meeting in which Ebert failed to inform the USPD members of the approaching army units. The three USPD members of the Council then left the Chancellery. At some point, the Volksmarinedivision found out about the advancing troops for they also marched towards the Chancellery and got there first. Dorrenbach met Ebert and asked him to remove the army troops. At the same time, the officers of these units arrived in Ebert's office and asked him for his orders and whether they should open fire. Nothing is known about the ensuing conversation, except that Ebert promised to resolve the situation on the next day by a Kabinettsbeschluss (cabinet decision). The result was that both sides pulled back. The Volksmarinedivision returned to the Marstall, the army to the Tiergarten. However, at 2 am Ebert did order the troops to attack the Marstall in the morning.

Later, Ebert argued that he had done so to save the life of Wels. However, according to Philipp Scheidemann, another People's Deputy, Wels appeared in the Chancellery at around 3 am, an hour after the order was given but several hours before the attack started. According to a different version, there had been another telephone conversation between Ebert and Groener in which the latter had threatened to end their cooperation unless stern steps were taken against the revolting unit.

== 24 December 1918 ==
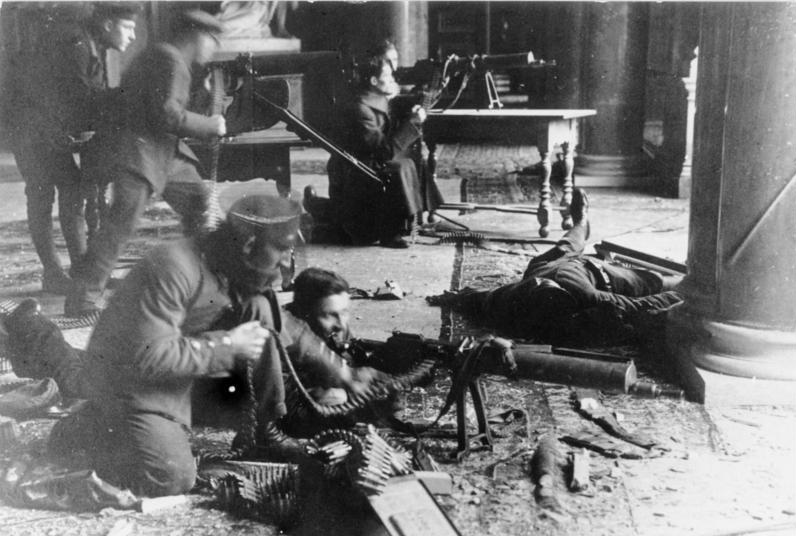
Soldiers of the Volksmarinedivision during the fighting on 24 December in the Berlin Palace

Shortly before 8 am the army units on the Palace Square opened fire with their artillery. Although accounts of the actual fighting are confused and contradictory, it was a victory for the Volksmarinedivision. The initial barrage of machine gun and artillery fire from several sides was without serious effects, except for significant damage to the buildings. In the first hour of fighting, around 60 shells hit the Berlin Palace and the Marstall. Between 9 and 10 am masses of unarmed civilians, including women and children, gathered and urged the army troops to stop fighting.

At around 10 am, there was a pause in the fighting to allow the women and children to be removed from the vicinity of the fighting. At 10:30, the fight resumed with increased ferocity and the Volksmarinedivision now was on the offensive. According to reports, some government troops switched sides. In addition, the Sicherheitswehr, part of the Berlin police force commanded by Emil Eichhorn of the USPD, as well as armed and unarmed civilians joined the division and opposed the regular troops.

Around noon, the skirmish ended. The army troops promised to leave and were offered a chance to withdraw. The Volksmarinedivision held the field but agreed to return to their quarters. Since both sides took their dead and wounded with them there were no independent estimates of casualties. But according to reports, the regular troops suffered 56 dead and 35 wounded against just 11 dead and 23 wounded from the Volksmarinedivision.

== Consequences ==
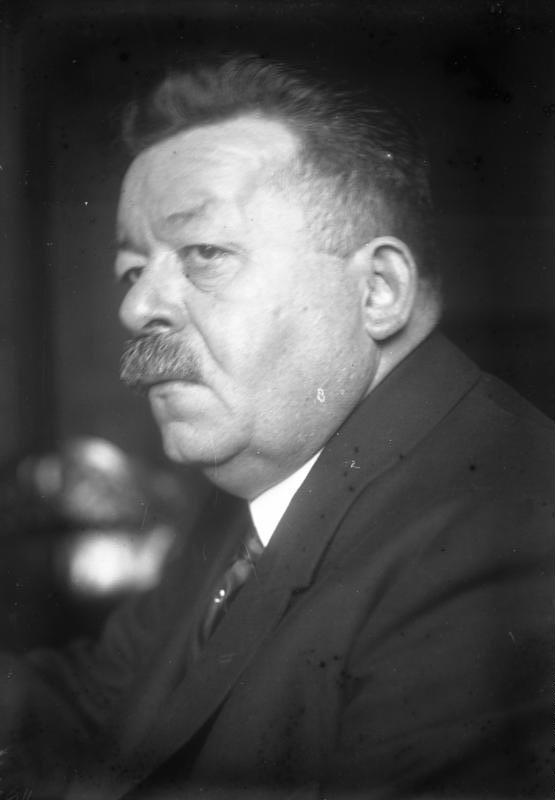
Friedrich Ebert in 1925

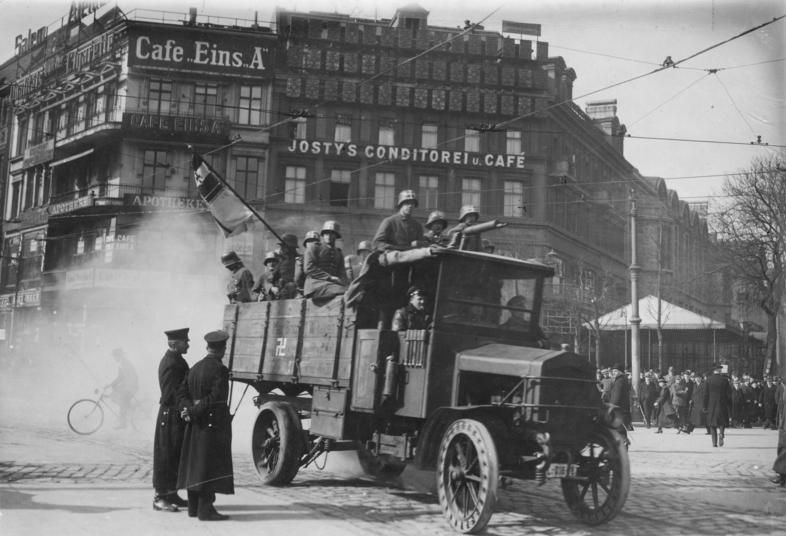
Freikorps supporting the Kapp Putsch in March 1920, at Potsdamer Platz, Berlin

As a direct result of the confrontation, which was seen as a political defeat for Ebert, Wels had to resign his post as commander of the city's forces (Stadtkommandant). The division had to leave the Palace and the Marstall but was not dissolved. Their demands for pay had to be satisfied and the reduction in size was postponed.

A more important consequence of this event, which the Spartacist leader Karl Liebknecht called "Eberts Blutweihnacht" ("Ebert's Bloody Christmas"), was that the USPD members left the Rat der Volksbeauftragten on 29 December. The next day, SPD members Gustav Noske and Rudolf Wissell took their place. That same day, the Spartacists severed their remaining links with the USPD and set themselves up as the new Kommunistische Partei (KPD). They were joined by some USPD members from Hamburg and Bremen. Thus the more radical elements had been pushed out of the revolutionary government. Rather than working inside it alongside the "Majority" SPD members, the USPD now joined the Spartacists in opposition to the SPD, leaving none of those who wanted a social revolution still in power. Moreover, the radical left was deeply divided and there was no sign of a Lenin-type leader emerging.

However, when the fallen members of the Volksmarinedivision were buried in Friedrichshain thousands of embittered people attended the funeral. They carried placards saying: "Als Matrosenmörder klagen wir an: Ebert, Landsberg und Scheidemann" (Charged as murderers of sailors: Ebert, Landsberg and Scheidemann) and shouted "Down with the traitors!". This foreshadowed the events of January 1919. When Emil Eichhorn refused to accept his dismissal as president of the Berlin police—resulting not least from his support for the revolting sailors—the people took to the streets en masse in his support. This would lead to what has become known as the Spartakusaufstand or Spartakuswoche, but is more accurately referred to as the Januaraufstand ("January Uprising"), since it was mostly an attempt by the revolutionary workers of Berlin to repeat their feat of 9 November and to regain what they had won then and subsequently half lost.

The renewed failure of regular troops—after the disintegration of the forces assembled in Berlin for the planned restoration of order on 10 to 15 December—also gave support to those within the military who argued in favour of increased reliance on hard-core volunteer troops. Since the middle of November, the OHL had supported the creation by some officers of so-called Freikorps, voluntary units of soldiers who were mostly nationalistic, monarchistic and anti-revolution, even while the demobilisation of the regular (conscripted) army was ongoing. As a result of the Weihnachtskämpfe, the government—in particular Noske—now joined the OHL in these efforts. These new military forces were intended both to secure the eastern border (e.g. in Posen) and protect the newly formed Baltic states against the Red Army, but also to restore law and order within the Reich.

== Bibliography ==
- Jones, Mark (2016). Founding Weimar: Violence and the German Revolution of 1918–1919. Cambridge: Cambridge University Press. ISBN 978-1-107-11512-5.
