= List of German People's Party politicians =

A list of notable politicians of the defunct German People's Party:

German People's Party

== A ==
- Wilhelm Adam
- Helmuth Albrecht, de:Helmuth Albrecht (Politiker)
- Rudolf Asmis

== B ==
- Alfred Baum, de:Alfred Baum (Politiker)
- Johann Becker
- Georg Bellmann, de:Georg Bellmann
- Marie Bernays
- Heinrich Beythien
- Theodor Bickes, de:Theodor Bickes
- Friedrich Bischof, de:Friedrich Bischof
- Heinrich Bömers, de:Heinrich Bömers
- William Borm
- Albert Brackmann
- Ernst Brandi
- Karl Brandi
- Helmut Brandt
- Franz Brüninghaus, de:Franz Brüninghaus
- Karl von Buchka
- Wilhelm Bünger

== C ==
- Friedrich Cramm, de:Friedrich Cramm
- Carl Cremer, de:Carl Cremer
- Julius Curtius

== D ==
- Regine Deutsch
- Johannes Dieckmann
- Eduard Dingeldey
- Alexander Graf zu Dohna-Schlodien, de:Alexander Graf zu Dohna-Schlodien

== G ==
- Friedrich Grimm

== H ==
- Carl von Halfern
- Renate Haußleiter-Malluche
- August Haußleiter
- Rudolf Heinze
- Otto Hembeck, de:Otto Hembeck
- Richard Heyne
- Hugo Hickmann

== J ==
- Karl Jarres
- Edgar Jung

== K ==
- Wilhelm Kahl, de:Wilhelm Kahl
- Wilhelm Ferdinand Kalle
- Gerhard von Kanitz
- Siegfried von Kardorff
- Otto Keinath, de:Otto Keinath
- Otto Kiep
- Walter Koch
- Gustav Koenigs
- Erich Köhler
- Eugen Köngeter, de:Eugen Köngeter
- Paul von Krause
- Johannes Kriege
- Rudolf Krohne

== L ==
- Carl Langbehn
- Richard Leutheußer, de:Richard Leutheußer
- Arthur Lieutenant
- Walter Lohmann, de:Walter Lohmann (Politiker, 1861

== M ==
- Elsa Matz, de:Elsa Matz
- Kurt Melcher
- Clara Mende
- Gustav Meyer zu Belm, de:Gustav Meyer zu Belm
- Paul Moldenhauer
- Richard Münnich

== N ==
- Max Naumann
- Alice Neven DuMont

== O ==
- Katharina von Oheimb

== P ==
- Hermann Paasche
- Friedrich Pfeffer, de:Friedrich Pfeffer
- Max Planck
- Margarete Poehlmann

== Q ==
- Reinhold Quaatz

== R ==
- Hans von Raumer
- Engelbert Regh, de:Engelbert Regh
- Hermann Reincke-Bloch, de:Hermann Reincke-Bloch
- Werner von Rheinbaben
- Hans Richert
- Karl Riedel, de:Karl Riedel (Politiker)
- Gerhard Ritter
- Verena Rodewald

== S ==
- Karl Sack
- Walther Schieck
- Anton Schifferer
- Wilhelm Schmieding, de:Wilhelm Schmieding (Politiker, 1879)
- Heinrich Schnee
- Rudolph Schneider, de:Rudolph Schneider
- Ernst Scholz
- Kurt Baron von Schröder
- Elisabeth Schwarzhaupt
- Hans von Seeckt
- Emil Georg von Stauss
- Hugo Stinnes
- Albrecht Graf zu Stolberg-Wernigerode, de:Albrecht Graf zu Stolberg-Wernigerode
- Emmy Stradal
- Gustav Stresemann

== T ==
- Ernst Tengelmann
- Otto Thiel, de:Otto Thiel (Politiker)
- Georg Thilenius

== V ==
- Albert Vögler

== W ==
- Victor Weidtman, de:Victor Weidtman (Jurist)
- Hermann-Eberhard Wildermuth

== Z ==
- Arthur Zarden
