= First Stresemann cabinet =

1923 cabinet of Weimar Germany

First Cabinet of Gustav Stresemann
- 8th Cabinet of Weimar Germany
- 13 August 1923 – 3 October 1923 (until 6 October 1923 as caretaker government)
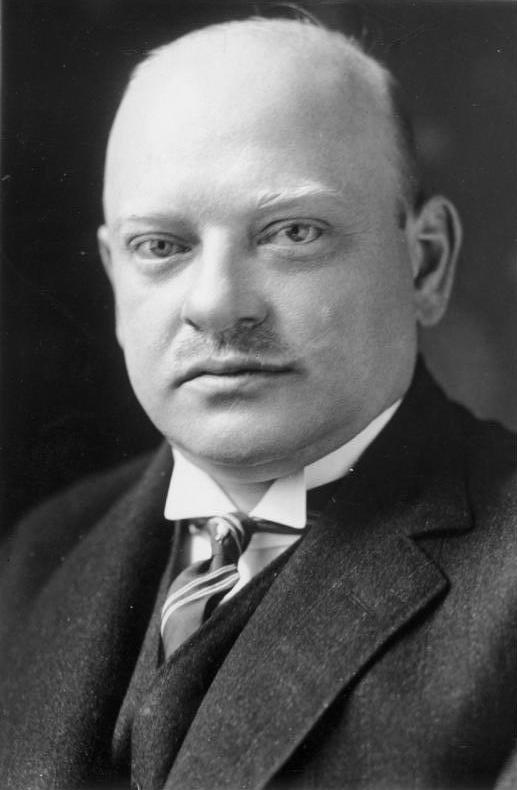
- Chancellor Gustav Stresemann
- Date formed: 13 August 1923
- Date dissolved: 6 October 1923 (1 month and 23 days)

People and organisations
- President: Friedrich Ebert
- Chancellor: Gustav Stresemann
- Vice Chancellor: Robert Schmidt
- Member parties: German People's Party; Social Democratic Party; Centre Party; German Democratic Party
- Status in legislature: Majority coalition government
- Opposition parties: German National People's Party; Communist Party of Germany

History
- Election: 1920 federal election
- Legislature term: 1st Reichstag of the Weimar Republic
- Predecessor: Cuno cabinet
- Successor: Second Stresemann cabinet

The first Stresemann cabinet, headed by Gustav Stresemann of the German People's Party (DVP), was the eighth democratically elected government of the Weimar Republic. The cabinet took office on 13 August 1923 when it replaced the Cuno cabinet under Wilhelm Cuno, which had resigned following a call by the Social Democratic Party for a vote of no confidence, which Cuno knew he could not win.

The four centre-left to centre parties in Stresemann's coalition did not have a formal coalition agreement, and the Reichstag was not in session during most of the cabinet's short tenure. That led to the use of emergency decrees to handle Germany's economic problems and to fight the move towards a right-wing dictatorship in Bavaria.

The cabinet resigned late on 3 October 1923 over a disagreement on increasing working hours for key industrial labourers and was replaced on 6 October by a second Stresemann cabinet.

== Establishment ==
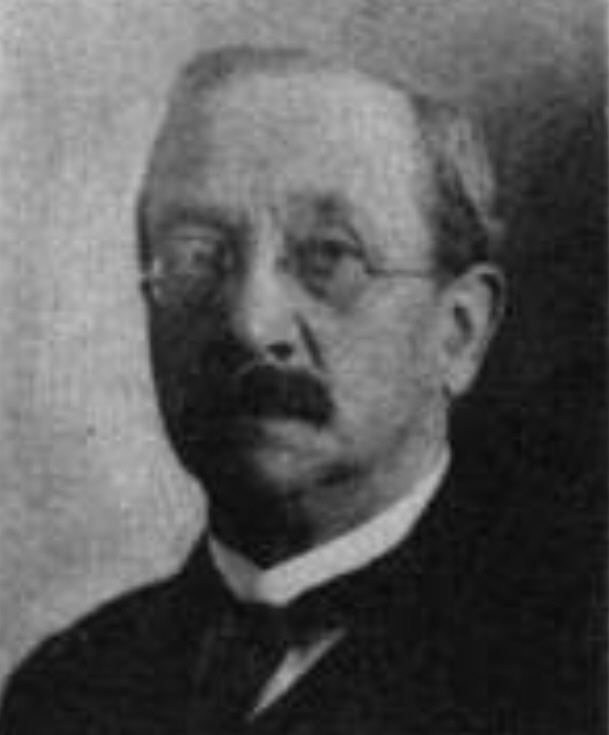
Robert Schmidt (SPD), Vice-Chancellor and Reconstruction Minister

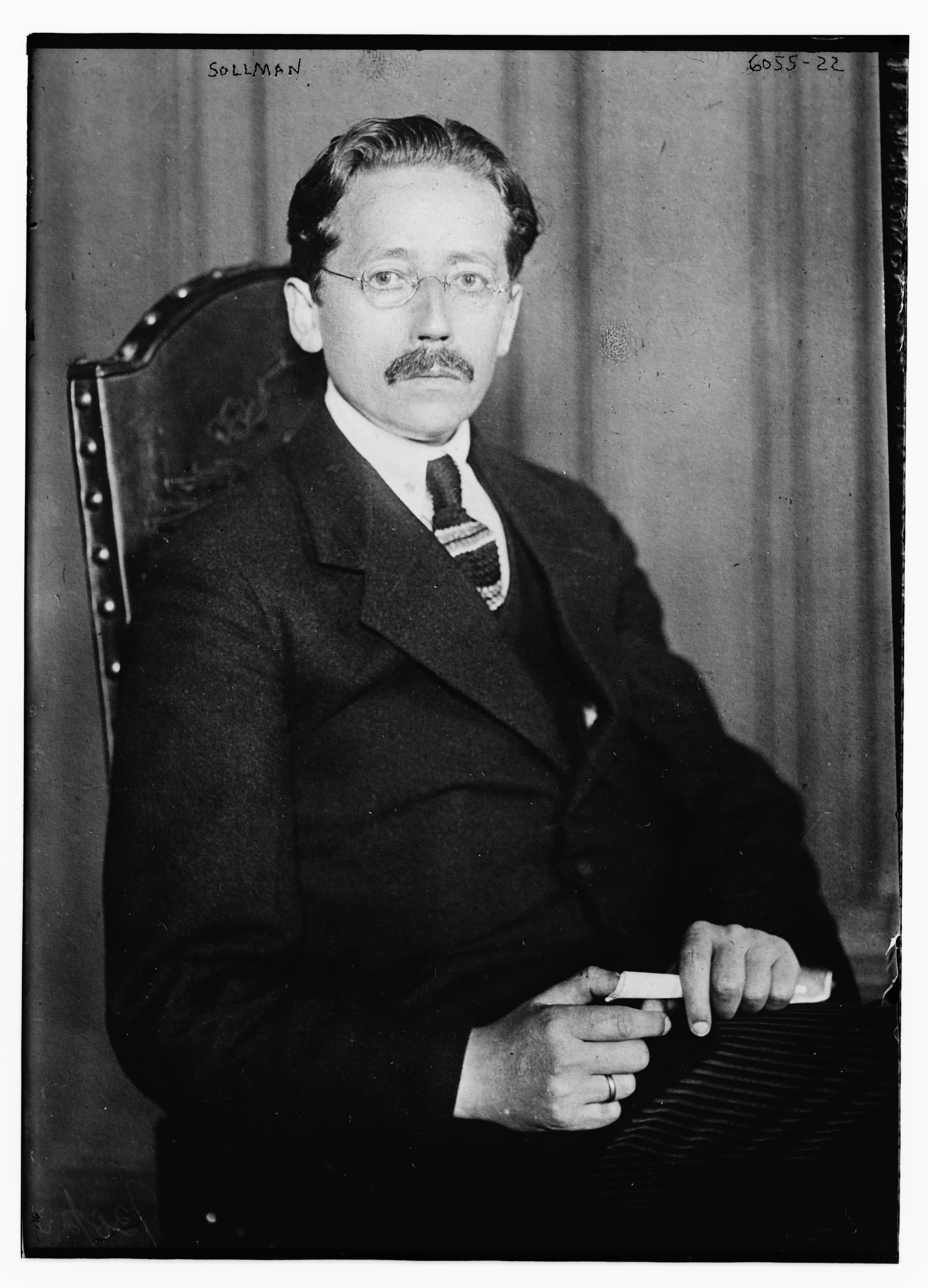
Wilhelm Sollmann (SPD), Minister of the Interior

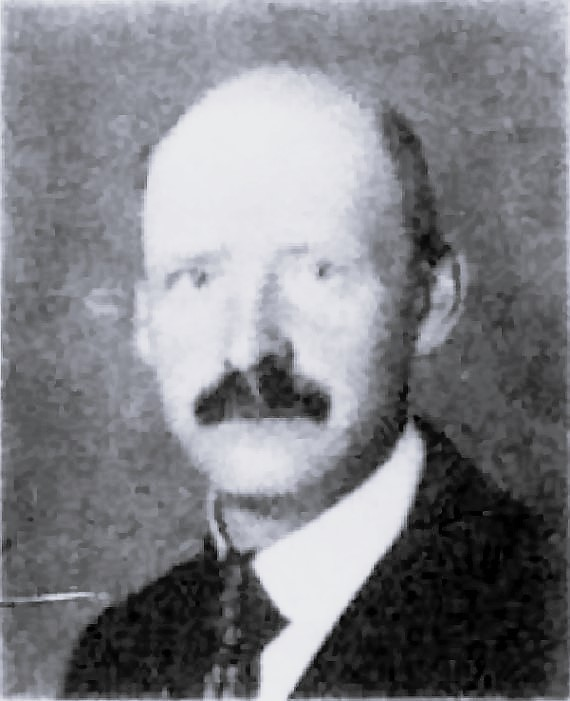
Gustav Radbruch (SPD), Minister of Justice

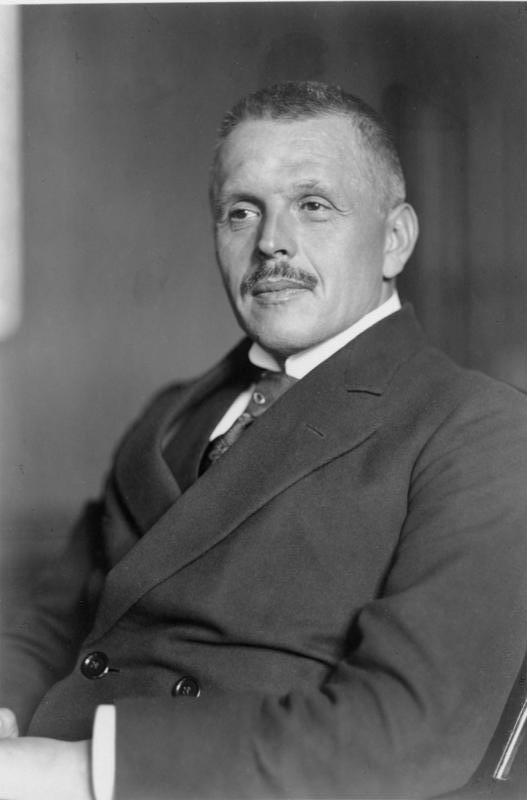
Otto Gessler (DDP), Reichswehrminister

The Cuno cabinet resigned largely due to dissatisfaction over the way it had handled the occupation of the Ruhr by French and Belgian troops in January 1923. Its resignation was officially transmitted to President Friedrich Ebert late on 12 August 1923. At roughly the same time, Ebert asked the chairman of the German People's Party (DVP), Gustav Stresemann, to form a new government. On the evening of 13 August, Ebert appointed Stresemann chancellor. At that point, the list of ministers for the new cabinet was mostly completed. It was the fastest formation of a government between the replacement of the Weimar National Assembly by the Reichstag in 1920 and the period of the presidential cabinets that began in 1930. The first cabinet meeting took place on 14 August, within 36 hours of Cuno's resignation.

Stresemann's cabinet was based on a grand coalition of the DVP, Social Democrats, Centre Party and German Democratic Party (DDP). There was no coalition agreement, and the government declaration of 14 August 1923 did not offer a political program. The most pressing tasks for the government were stabilising the currency and solving the related problem of the occupied territories. After the Ruhr occupation, the Cuno government had increasingly resorted to printing money in order to finance the extra spending and replace the loss of tax revenue caused by the government's policy of passive resistance against the occupation. As a result, the already high rate of inflation spiked. By the summer, the resulting collapse of the mark in the currency markets led to shortages of foreign currencies to pay for vital food imports.

== Members ==
The members of the cabinet were as follows: (Note: Four of the cabinet members were not members of the Reichstag: Rudolf Hilferding, Hans Luther, Rudolf Oeser and Johannes Fuchs.)

Portfolio	Minister	Took office	Left office	Party
Chancellorship	Gustav Stresemann	13 August 1923	6 October 1923	DVP
Vice-Chancellorship	Robert Schmidt	13 August 1923	6 October 1923	SPD
Foreign Affairs	Gustav Stresemann	13 August 1923	6 October 1923	DVP
Interior	Wilhelm Sollmann	13 August 1923	6 October 1923	SPD
Justice	Gustav Radbruch	13 August 1923	6 October 1923	SPD
Labour	Heinrich Brauns	13 August 1923	6 October 1923	Centre
Reichswehr	Otto Gessler	13 August 1923	6 October 1923	DDP
Economic Affairs	Hans von Raumer	13 August 1923	6 October 1923	DVP
Finance	Rudolf Hilferding	13 August 1923	6 October 1923	SPD
Food and Agriculture	Hans Luther	13 August 1923	6 October 1923	Independent
Transport	Rudolf Oeser	13 August 1923	6 October 1923	DDP
Postal Affairs	Anton Höfle	29 August 1923	6 October 1923	Centre
Reconstruction	Robert Schmidt	29 March 1923	6 October 1923	SPD
Occupied Territories	Johannes Fuchs (Note: The Ministry for the Occupied Territories, responsible for the territories occupied by France and Belgium, was created by presidential order on 24 August 1923. Johannes Fuchs was appointed acting head of the yet-to-be created ministry on 13 August 1923.) (acting)	13 August 1923	6 October 1923	Centre

== In office ==
From 15 August to 27 September 1923, the Reichstag was not in session. During that time, the government relied on Article 48 of the Weimar Constitution, which allowed the president to issue emergency decrees with the consent of the chancellor.

In the cabinet meeting of 30 September, the government discussed the necessity of a further transfer of power from parliament to the cabinet. In particular, the situation in Bavaria – which was moving towards a right-wing dictatorship under State Commissioner Gustav Ritter von Kahr – gave rise to concern over Germany's unity. Several cabinet members argued in favour of a far-reaching independence of the government from the political parties, but the Reichstag party groups refused to cooperate. There was consensus on the need to put an extra burden both on wealth and on workers by extending working hours from the current norm of an eight-hour workday and a six-day working week (seven hours in the crucial coal industry), although the extent and manner of increasing working hours were a matter of controversy.

On 1 October, the cabinet agreed on the need for an enabling act that would give the government wide-ranging powers not just in the financial and economic sphere but also allow it to increase working hours in industries it considered vital. The next day, however, the party leaders clashed on the issue. Hermann Müller, chairman of the SPD, with an eye towards the unions and political competition from the Communist Party (KPD), argued against it. Ernst Scholz of the DVP demanded a decree raising working hours in addition to including the right-wing German National People's Party (DNVP) in the government.

== Resignation ==
The increase in the working day was included in the government proclamation of 2 October. The enabling act was to be limited to financial and economic issues, with the understanding that the latter would encompass social measures. The Reichstag SPD party membership refused to agree and insisted on the parliament's involvement in changes to working hours. The DDP and Centre Party were willing to go along. Hans Luther (an independent) and Otto Gessler (DDP) were opposed, with the latter arguing against the asymmetry of "burdening wealth by decree, but the working class only by law". Stresemann tried and failed to win agreement from his party. As a result, the cabinet resigned late on 3 October. It was followed by a reshuffled cabinet, led once again by Stresemann, on 6 October.
