= Cuno cabinet =

1922–1923 cabinet of Weimar Germany

Cabinet of Wilhelm Cuno
- 7th Cabinet of Weimar Germany
- 22 November 1922 – 12 August 1923
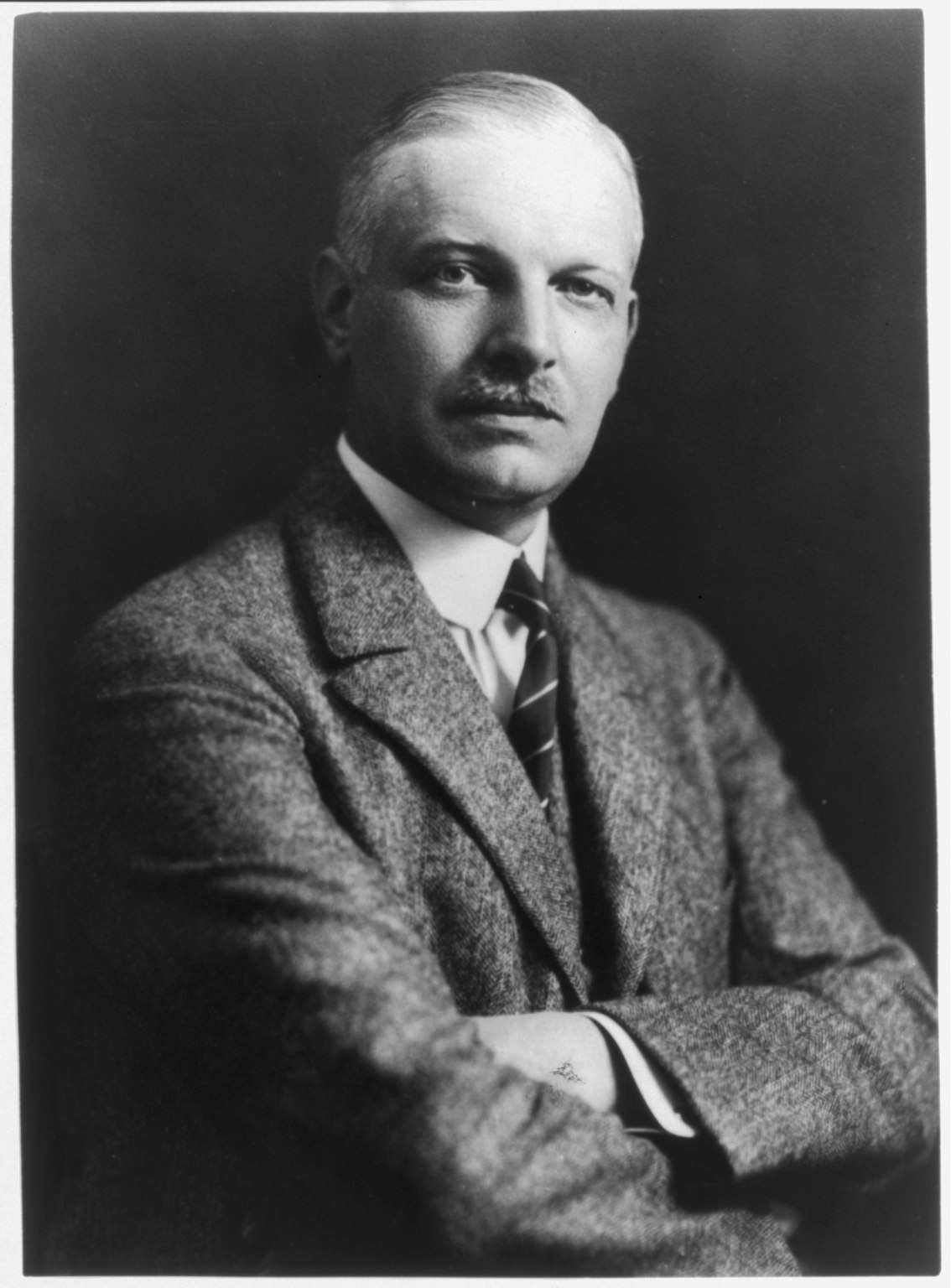
- Chancellor Wilhelm Cuno
- Date formed: 22 November 1922
- Date dissolved: 12 August 1923 (8 months and 21 days)

People and organisations
- President: Friedrich Ebert
- Chancellor: Wilhelm Cuno
- Member parties: Centre Party; German Democratic Party; German People's Party; Bavarian People's Party
- Status in legislature: Minority coalition government
- Opposition parties: Communist Party of Germany

History
- Election: 1920 federal election
- Legislature term: 1st Reichstag of the Weimar Republic
- Predecessor: Second Wirth cabinet
- Successor: First Stresemann cabinet

The Cuno cabinet, headed by Chancellor Wilhelm Cuno, a political independent, was the seventh democratically elected government of the Weimar Republic. It took office on 22 November 1922 when it replaced the second cabinet of Joseph Wirth, which had resigned after being unable to restructure its coalition following the loss of a key vote in the Reichstag.

Cuno was made chancellor by presidential decree without a vote in the Reichstag. Four of the members of his cabinet were independents with economic experience; the remainder were from centre or centre-right parties. Unlike in previous Weimar cabinets, there was no formal coalition agreement.

The Cuno cabinet's attempts to deal with reparations payments to the Allies of World War I were sidelined when France and Belgium accused Germany of not making the required payments on time and occupied the Ruhr on 11 January 1923. The government printed additional money to pay for its support of the large number of workers and businesses idled by its policy of passive resistance against the occupation. Inflation spiked and increased public discontent over the government's handling of the crisis.

The Cuno cabinet resigned on 12 August 1923 in the face of an almost certain loss in a vote of no confidence. It was replaced the next day by the first cabinet of Gustav Stresemann.

== Establishment ==
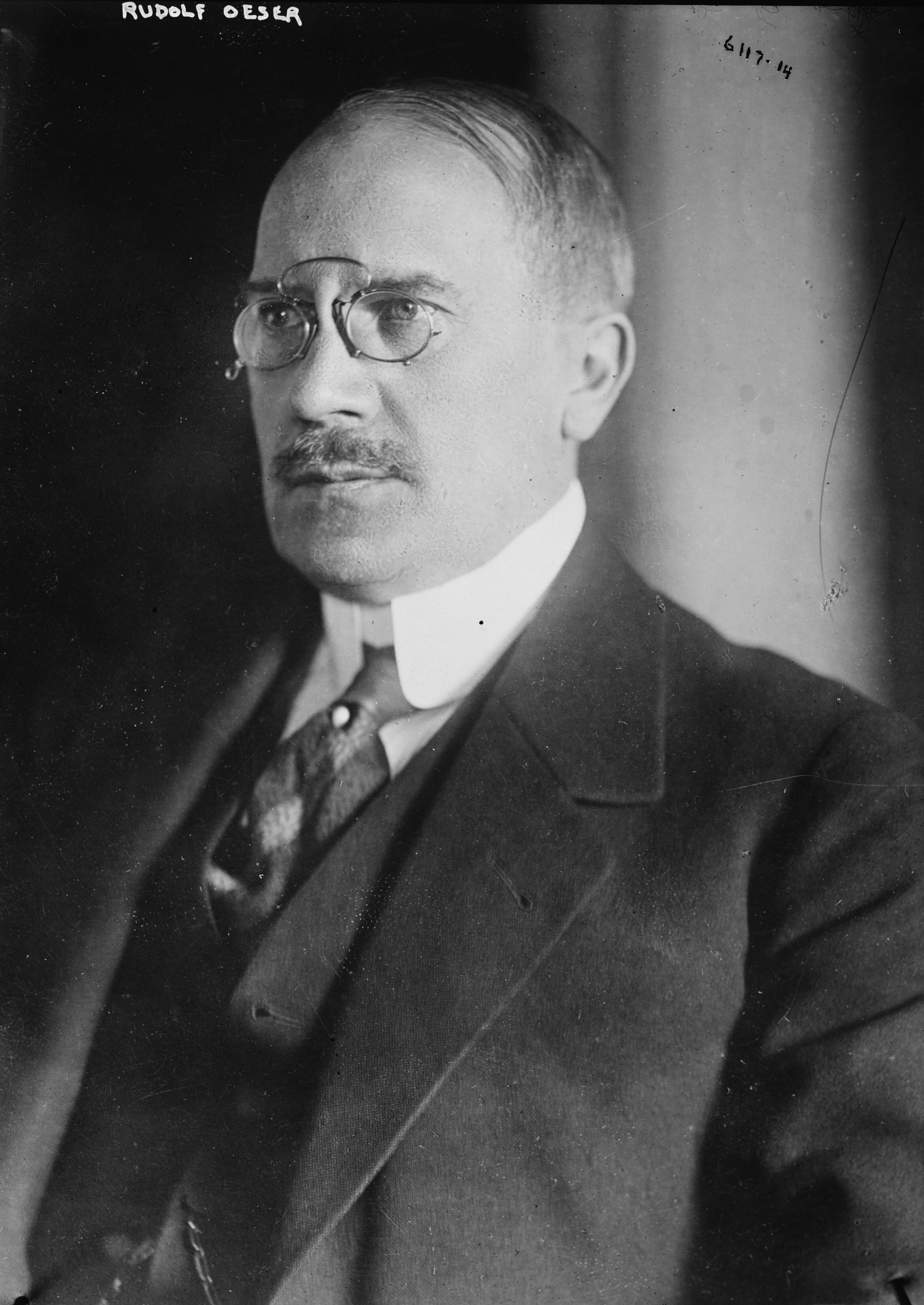
Rudolf Oeser (DDP), Minister of the Interior

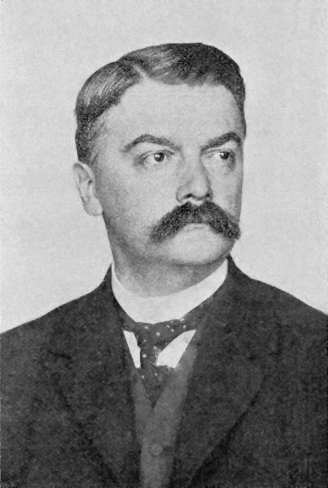
Rudolf Heinze (DVP), Minister of Justice

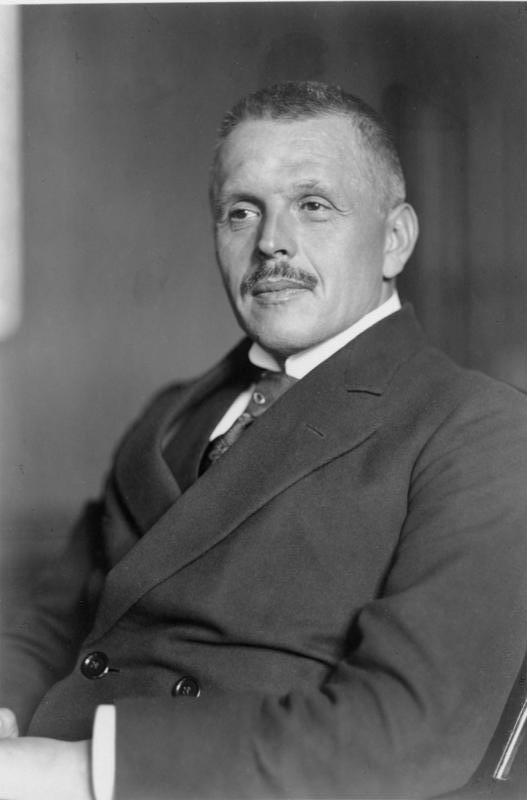
Otto Gessler (DDP), Reichswehr Minister

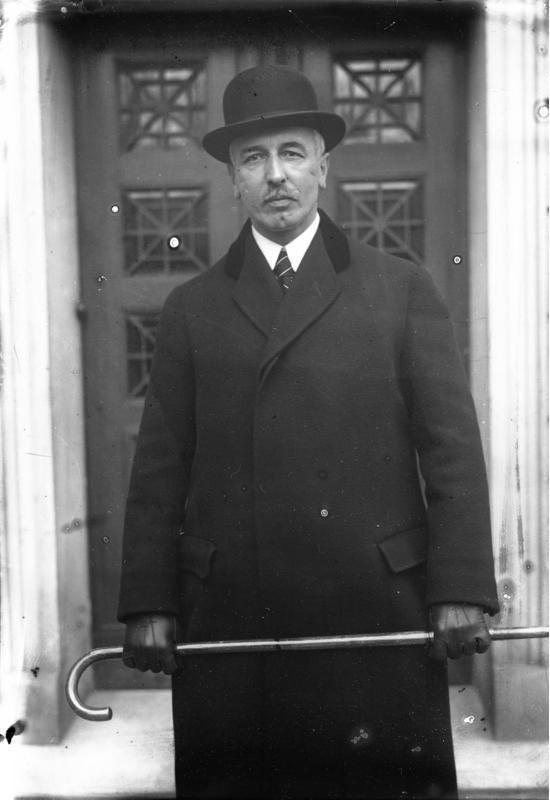
Heinrich Albert (Ind.), Minister of the Treasury and Minister for Reconstruction

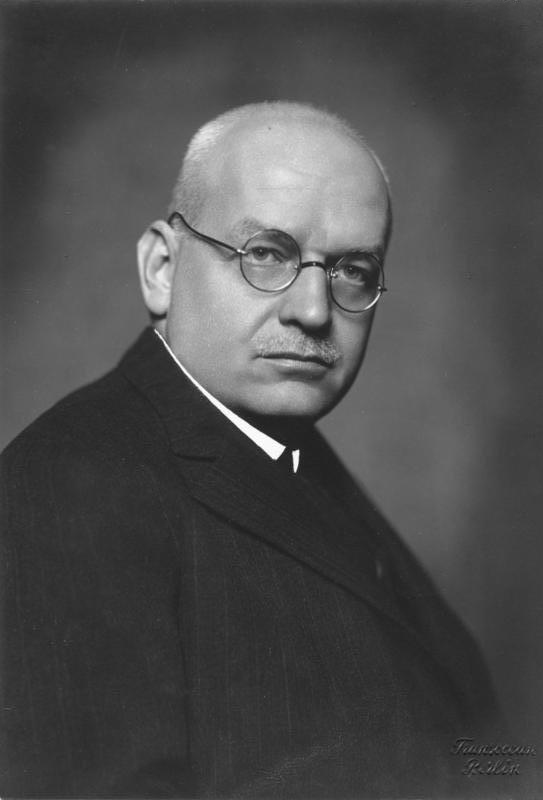
Hans Luther (Ind.), Minister of Food and Agriculture

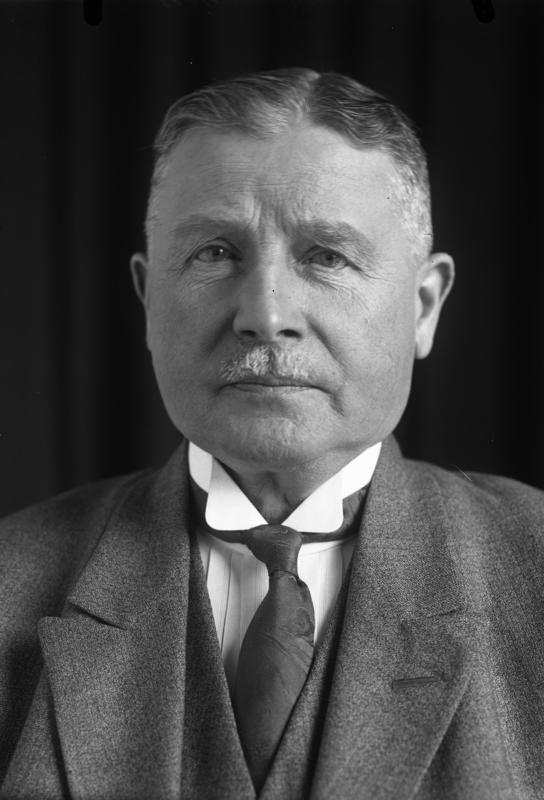
Wilhelm Groener (Ind.), Transport Minister

Joseph Wirth's second cabinet resigned on 14 November 1922 when he was unable to form a new coalition following the loss of an important vote in the Reichstag. The German President, Friedrich Ebert of the Social Democratic Party (SPD), asked the independent Wilhelm Cuno to form a new government on 16 November. Cuno tried to put together a broad coalition of parties stretching from the centre-right German People's Party (DVP) to the SPD, which had just reunited with the more radical Independent Social Democratic Party. A majority of the SPD's Reichstag delegation opposed Ebert and refused to agree to a coalition including the DVP. Cuno, who had been general director of the HAPAG shipping company, largely failed as well in his attempts to convince other business leaders to join his cabinet. After prolonged negotiations, Cuno was appointed chancellor on 22 November 1922 by presidential decree and without a vote in the Reichstag.

Cuno was the first chancellor in the Weimar Republic who was not a member of a party and a professional politician. Politically, he was quite far to the right of President Ebert. Cuno formed a government partly composed of independents with economic experience – Wilhelm Groener, Heinrich Albert, Frederic von Rosenberg and – a few days later – Hans Luther. The balance of the cabinet was made up of members of the German People's Party (2 ministers), the German Democratic Party (2 ministers), the Centre Party (3 ministers) and the Bavarian People's Party (one). The government was referred to alternatively as a business ministry, an economic government or a cabinet of personalities, emphasising that it was not the result of a formal coalition between parliamentary parties. There was no written coalition agreement, but the parties that provided cabinet members were its core support in the Reichstag. It was dependent on toleration from either the SPD or the right of centre German National People's Party (DNVP). Initially, both of the parties were neutral or slightly supportive, but Cuno was still not able to put his cabinet to an outright vote of confidence. As a compromise, the Reichstag "took notice" of the government declaration and Cuno's reference to the last policy statement of Wirth's cabinet as the basis of his own platform. Only the Communist Party (KPD) voted against him. The Cuno government was the first Weimar government endorsed, if weakly, by the nationalists of the DNVP.

== Members ==
The members of the cabinet were as follows:

Portfolio	Minister	Took office	Left office	Party
Chancellorship	Wilhelm Cuno	22 November 1922	12 August 1923	Independent
Vice-Chancellorship	Vacant	–	–	–
Foreign Affairs	Frederic von Rosenberg	22 November 1922	12 August 1923	Independent
Interior	Rudolf Oeser	22 November 1922	12 August 1923	DDP
Justice	Rudolf Heinze	22 November 1922	12 August 1923	DVP
Labour	Heinrich Brauns	22 November 1922	12 August 1923	Centre
Reichswehr	Otto Gessler	22 November 1922	12 August 1923	DDP
Economic Affairs	Johann Becker	22 November 1922	12 August 1923	DVP
Finance	Andreas Hermes	22 November 1922	12 August 1923	Centre
Treasury (Note: The Treasury Ministry was merged with the Ministry of Finance on 1 April 1923.)	Heinrich Albert	22 November 1922	20 March 1923	Independent
Food and Agriculture	Karl Müller	22 November 1922	25 November 1922	Centre
Food and Agriculture	Hans Luther	25 November 1922	12 August 1923	Independent
Transport	Wilhelm Groener	22 November 1922	12 August 1923	Independent
Postal affairs	Karl Stingl	22 November 1922	12 August 1923	BVP
Reconstruction	Gustav Müller (acting)	22 November 1922	29 March 1923	Independent
Reconstruction	Heinrich Albert	30 March 1923	12 August 1923	Independent

== Occupation of the Ruhr and hyperinflation ==
The closeness between Cuno and the political right was a handicap for his cooperation with the SPD, the strongest party in the Reichstag. Yet the domestic issues that threatened to limit the cabinet's lifespan were quickly rendered secondary by foreign policy events when the occupation of the Ruhr brought on a national emergency.

Dealing with the pressing matter of war reparations had been a priority for the Cuno government from the day it took office, as it had been for the Wirth government. The new government continued to follow the policies of its predecessor on the issue. The goal was to convince the Allies of World War I to accept an extended payment moratorium for three to four years that would allow the Germans to stabilise their economy and currency before resuming transfers. The French had budget problems of their own and refused to compromise, holding the German side to earlier agreements. The French government of Prime Minister and Foreign Minister Raymond Poincaré was convinced that Germany and its industry were unwilling rather than unable to make the reparations payments. A debt moratorium was considered possible only if France were able to obtain "productive collateral" (such as direct Allied control over the coal mines of the Ruhr). On 26 December 1922, the Inter-Allied Reparations Commission, against the vote of the British commissioner, formally found that Germany had culpably failed to comply with its obligations concerning the delivery of wood. Similarly, it was found on 9 January 1923 that the 1922 coal deliveries to France had been deficient. Two days later, French and Belgian troops occupied the Ruhr.

The move caused outrage among the German public, media and political circles. All reparations to France and Belgium were stopped. A policy of passive resistance against all orders issued by the occupying authorities was announced. The mines were told not to make any more deliveries to France or Belgium, and civil servants and railroad personnel were told to disobey orders by the occupation authorities. The Ruhr economy, the industrial heartland of Germany, came almost to a complete stop.

The German government paid for the upkeep of the families of those expelled or arrested by the occupation forces and to support the rising number of people who became unemployed as a result of the industrial disruptions caused by the policy of passive resistance. Economic activity and tax revenues were adversely affected by the negative economic fallout of the Ruhr occupation and strikes. The costs were not paid for by raising taxes or through long-term borrowing in the credit markets, but by printing money. As a result, inflation spiked and the mark went into free fall on the currency markets. Concerns rose that the supply of imported food would dry up due to a lack of foreign currency. It was quickly draining away due to the Reichsbank's ultimately futile attempts to stabilise the mark.

Attempts by the government to end the occupation and to resume talks about reparations in May and June 1923 failed as Poincaré refused to negotiate unless passive resistance was ended first. The hard stance taken by the French brought the German side some international sympathy, and the French soon became isolated on the issue. On 11 August, the British government sent a harshly critical memorandum to the French, which explicitly endorsed the German position that the Ruhr occupation was illegal. By that time, popular discontent inside Germany against the government and in particular against the spiralling rate of inflation was rising fast. A wave of strikes against the government began in August 1923.

== Resignation ==
Also on 11 August, the Social Democrats brought a motion of no confidence against the government and announced their willingness to cooperate in a possible future grand coalition. Before the motion could be brought to a vote in the Reichstag, Cuno and his cabinet resigned. A day later, Gustav Stresemann of the German People's Party became chancellor and formed his first cabinet.
