= Otto Gessler =

German politician (1875–1955)

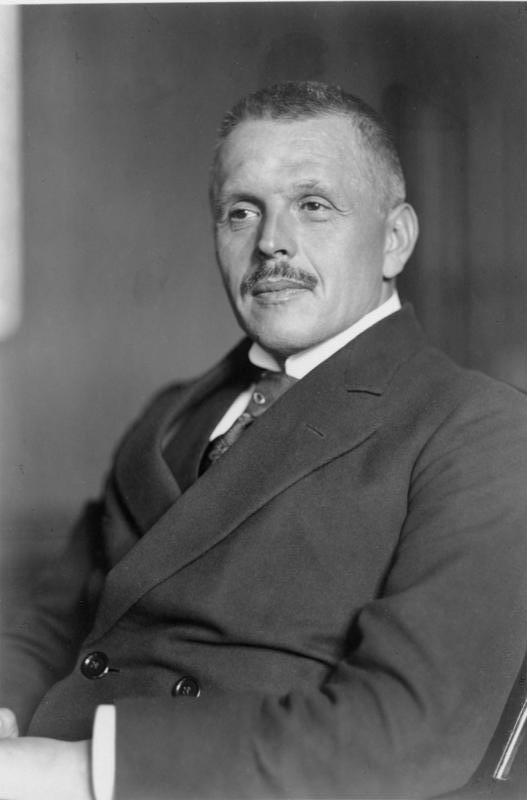
- Gessler in the 1920s

Reich Minister of Defence
- In office 27 March 1920 – 19 January 1928
- Chancellor: Hermann Müller; Constantin Fehrenbach; Joseph Wirth; Wilhelm Cuno; Gustav Stresemann; Wilhelm Marx; Hans Luther
- Preceded by: Gustav Noske
- Succeeded by: Wilhelm Groener

Reich Minister of the Interior
- Acting; 23 October 1925 – 5 December 1925
- Chancellor: Hans Luther
- Preceded by: Martin Schiele
- Succeeded by: Wilhelm Külz

Reich Minister for Reconstruction
- In office 25 October 1919 – 24 March 1920
- Chancellor: Gustav Bauer
- Preceded by: Office established
- Succeeded by: Walther Rathenau

Member of the Reichstag
- In office 1920–1924
- Constituency: National list

Personal details
- Born: 6 February 1875 Ludwigsburg, Kingdom of Württemberg, German Empire
- Died: 24 March 1955 (aged 80) Lindenberg im Allgäu, Bavaria, West Germany
- Party: German Democratic Party
- Other political affiliations: Progressive People's Party (1910–1918)
- Profession: Politician

Otto Karl Gessler (or Geßler; 6 February 1875 – 24 March 1955) was a liberal German politician during the Weimar Republic. From 1910 until 1914, he was mayor of Regensburg and from 1913 to 1919 mayor of Nuremberg. He served in numerous Weimar cabinets, most notably as Reichswehrminister (Minister of Defence) from 1920 to 1928.

== Early life ==
Otto Karl Gessler was born on 6 February 1875 in Ludwigsburg in the Kingdom of Württemberg as the son of the non-commissioned officer Otto Gessler and his wife Karoline (née Späth). He finished school in 1894 with the Abitur at the Humanistisches Gymnasium in Dillingen an der Donau. He studied law in Erlangen, Tübingen and Leipzig and received his doctorate there in 1900. Initially, he worked for the judicial service of Leipzig. He then moved to Bavaria and served in various positions in the Bavarian justiciary (1903 clerk in the Bavarian Ministry of Justice, 1904 prosecutor in Straubing, 1905 Gewerberichter in Munich) before moving into public administration. In 1903, Gessler married Maria Helmschrott (died 1954).

== Political career ==
=== Empire and Weimar Republic ===
Gessler was mayor of Regensburg from 1910 to 1914 and mayor of Nuremberg from 1913 to 1919. Because of reduced mobility due to a handicap he did not serve during World War I. He successfully headed the town administration of Nuremberg in the war years and contributed to the fact that there were no leftist takeovers in Nuremberg and Franconia the immediate aftermath of the war during the German Revolution of 1918-19.

Gessler was close to Friedrich Naumann and became one of the founders of the DDP in November 1918. In October 1919, he was appointed as Reichsminister für Wiederaufbau (Minister for Reconstruction) in the cabinet of Gustav Bauer. Gessler was not a staunch supporter of the new republic, describing himself as a Vernunftrepublikaner ("republican by reason only").

After the Kapp-Lüttwitz Putsch in March 1920 he assumed the office of Reichswehrminister (Minister of Defence) from Gustav Noske who was forced to resign as a result of the putsch.

Gessler kept that position for the next eight years, despite numerous changes of government. As Reichswehrminister he worked closely with Chef der Heeresleitung Hans von Seeckt in setting up the Reichswehr and turning it into a modern army. Gessler did not see his role as controlling the military, but rather in cooperating with the military command staff, which for its part viewed the Reichswehr's position as an independent and autonomous "state within the state". From 1920 to 1924, Gessler was also a member of the Reichstag.

Gessler played a key role in the 1923 German October. He and left-wing SPD premier of Saxony Erich Zeigner, an outspoken critic of the Reichswehr, shared a mutual antipathy. Gessler and conservative elements considered the Saxon and Thuringian governments suspect due to their reliance on the Communist Party for a parliamentary majority. Tensions grew throughout August and September as public clashes increased and Gessler cut contact with Zeigner. In early October, he called for the federal government to exercise its emergency powers, granted in response to the ongoing economic crisis and occupation of the Ruhr, to depose the state government. In the interim, he handed executive power to the Reichswehr commanders in the two states, who banned public gatherings and took control of the state police. At the same time, Gessler sought to avoid confrontation with the ultraconservative Bavarian government, who established a quasi-dictatorship in the latter months of the year and were known to be plotting a putsch against Berlin. The KPD were in fact planning a national uprising, and as preparation entered into coalition government in both Saxony and Thuringia alongside the SPD. However, after a joint conference in Chemnitz on 21 October indicated no desire for even a general strike among the left, plans were called off. Nonetheless, Chancellor Gustav Stresemann and the cabinet were swayed to Gessler's side and approved action; the state was occupied by the Reichswehr on 22 October.

Five days later, they demanded the formation of new governments in both Saxony and Thuringia without the Communists or else they would be deposed and Reich commissars installed to govern the states. While Thuringian premier August Frölich agreed to resign, Zeigner refused, stating that only the state parliament had the authority to force a change in government. The federal cabinet requested and received approval from President Friedrich Ebert on 29 October to depose him. This intervention, combined with the lack of action against the rebellious Bavarian government, led the SPD to threaten to quit cabinet. Gessler encouraged their departure, stating that their continued presence further incited the Bavarians to action; a "negotiated solution" could only be reached with them out of the picture. Historian Heinrich August Winkler described his stance as "nothing less than a partial capitulation" to the Bavarian regime. The SPD parliamentary group voted to withdraw from cabinet, and the rump minority government fell less than a month later, ending Stresemann's tenure as Chancellor.

From October to December 1925, Gessler also served as provisional Minister of the Interior and in May 1926 was Vice-Chancellor of Germany for a few days. In January 1927, the DDP voted against working with the coalition of the cabinet of Wilhelm Marx. To retain his position as Minister of Defence, Gessler left the party.

After the accusation of financial anomalies in his ministry associated with the secret re-armament of the Reichswehr (also known as The Lohmann Affair) Gessler was forced to resign in January 1928.

From 1928 to 1933, he was president of the Volksbund Deutsche Kriegsgräberfürsorge (German War Graves Commission) and of the Bund für die Erneuerung des Reiches. From 1931 to 1933, Gessler was president of the Verein für das Deutschtum im Ausland (VDA, today Verein für Deutsche Kulturbeziehungen im Ausland).

=== After 1933 ===
After the Machtergreifung of the Nazis in 1933, he retired from politics, in part due to ill health, and at first lived in seclusion at Lindenberg im Allgäu. Later in World War II, however, he became a member of the resistance group around Franz Sperr, had contacts with the Kreisau Circle, was included the resistance’s 1944 plans, and, in the event that the coup succeeded, was slated to be political commissioner in Military District VII (Munich) in the shadow cabinet of General Ludwig Beck and Carl Friedrich Goerdeler. He was named in documents of Claus von Stauffenberg and was arrested two days after the assassination attempt on Adolf Hitler of 20 July 1944. He was detained and tortured at Ravensbrück concentration camp and then held at various Berlin prisons until his release in February 1945.

After the end of World War II, Gessler became involved in humanitarian organizations. In 1949, he became president of the Bavaria Red Cross (a post he retained until his death) and in 1950 president of the German Red Cross. He was instrumental in the post-war reconstruction of the organization, serving as president until 1952.

From 1950 to 1955, Gessler was member of the Bavarian senate.

== Death and legacy ==
Gessler died on 24 March 1955 in Lindenberg im Allgäu. In 1958, his memoirs Reichswehrpolitik in der Weimarer Zeit were published posthumously.

The hospital in Lindenberg is named for Gessler.

Political offices
Preceded by Gustav Noske	Defence Minister of Germany; 1920–1928	Succeeded by Wilhelm Groener
Preceded by Martin Schiele	Interior Minister of Germany; 1925-1926	Succeeded by Wilhelm Külz
