= Richard Heyne =

- In office 1931–1934
- Preceded by: Konrad Haury
- Succeeded by: None

Personal details
- Born: 27 September 1882 Offenbach am Main
- Died: 18 March 1961 (aged 78) Offenbach am Main
- Party: DVP

Richard Heyne (27 September 1882, (Offenbach am Main) - 18 March 1961, (Offenbach am Main)) was a Hessian DVP politician and former member of the Landtags des Volksstaates Hessen in the Weimar Republic.

== Biography ==
Richard Heyne was the son of Kommerzienrat and screw factory owner Georg Heyne (1844-1908) and his wife Regine Johanette (birth name Helger). He was a Protestant and married Helene Roth.

Richard Heyne worked in the county governments of Oppenheim and Worms, most recently in the Executive Council. He was later a manufacturer at the firm Heyne & Co.

In 1931, Richard Heyne succeeded the late Konrad Haury in the Landtag des Volksstaates Hessen.
