= Regine Deutsch =

German writer and feminist activist (born 1860)

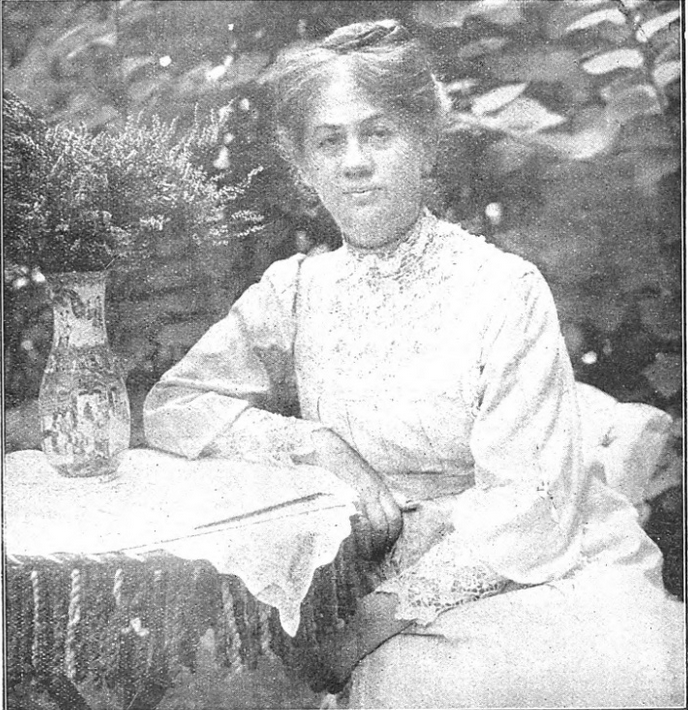
Deutsch in a 1919 publication.

Regine Deutsch (born Regine Lion on 1 March 1860) was a German feminist activist, politician, author and translator.

== Life ==
Regine Lion was born in Berlin, the daughter of a banker, and had a conventional German-Jewish upbringing. Even before the First World War she was active in the women's movement, in which later she took on a leadership role. She served as chair of the Prussian Regional League for Women's Rights ("Preußische Landesverband vom Verein für Frauenwahlrecht") and was a delegate to international congresses of the International Woman Suffrage Alliance (IWSA), as it was then known, of which she later published a history.

After the war she joined the liberal German Democratic Party ("Deutsche Demokratische Partei" / DDP), and it was as a member of the DDP that she was elected to the Berlin City Parliament ("Berliner Stadtverordnetenversammlung"). Later she was also a member of the National Women's Committee of the centrist liberal People's Party ("Deutsche Volkspartei" / DVP). During the 1920s she published several books about the parliamentary work of women. She also worked as an editor on the newspapers "Ernstes Wollen" and "Deutsche Kultur".

Following the Nazi take-over which took place at the beginning of 1933, political activism (except in support of the Nazi Party) became illegal, and it also became necessary for people pursuing careers as writers to be members of the Reich Chamber of Literature. Regine Deutsch was excluded from the Reich Chamber of Literature in 1935, almost certainly on account of her Jewish provenance. After this she disappears abruptly from the records, and her subsequent fate is unknown. An obituary for her was published in April 1939 indicating that she had died in 1938/39.
