= Robert Schmidt (German politician) =

German politician

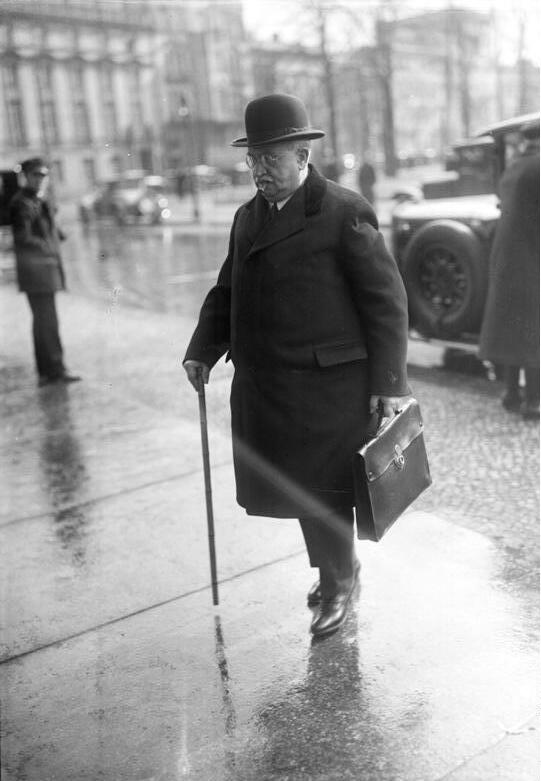

Vice-Chancellor of Germany
- In office 13 August 1923 – 6 October 1923
- Chancellor: Gustav Stresemann
- Preceded by: Gustav Bauer
- Succeeded by: Karl Jarres

Reich Minister for Reconstruction
- In office 13 August 1923 – 6 October 1923
- Chancellor: Gustav Stresemann
- Preceded by: Heinrich Albert
- Succeeded by: Office abolished

Reich Minister of Economics
- In office 10 May 1921 – 22 November 1922
- Chancellor: Joseph Wirth
- Preceded by: Ernst Scholz
- Succeeded by: Johann Becker
- In office 16 July 1919 – 21 June 1920
- Chancellor: Gustav Bauer; Hermann Müller
- Preceded by: Ernst Scholz
- Succeeded by: Johann Becker

Reich Minister for Food and Agriculture
- In office 13 February 1919 – 14 September 1919
- Chancellor: Philipp Scheidemann; Gustav Bauer
- Preceded by: Office established
- Succeeded by: Andreas Hermes

Member of the Reichstag (Weimar Republic)
- In office 6 February 1919 – 18 July 1930
- 1919–1920: Weimar National Assembly
- Constituency: Berlin (1919); National list (1920-1924); Westfalen Süd (1924-1930)

(German Empire)
- In office 3 December 1903 – 9 November 1918
- Constituency: Berlin 5

Personal details
- Born: 15 May 1864 Berlin, Kingdom of Prussia
- Died: 16 September 1943 (aged 79) Berlin, Nazi Germany
- Party: Social Democratic Party

Robert Schmidt (15 May 1864 – 16 September 1943) was a German trade unionist, journalist, politician and member of the Social Democratic Party of Germany. He served as the minister of Reichsernährungsminister (Alimentation), Reichswirtschaftsminister (Economic Affairs) and Reichsminister für Wiederaufbau (Reconstruction) in a number of cabinets of the Weimar Republic.

== Life ==
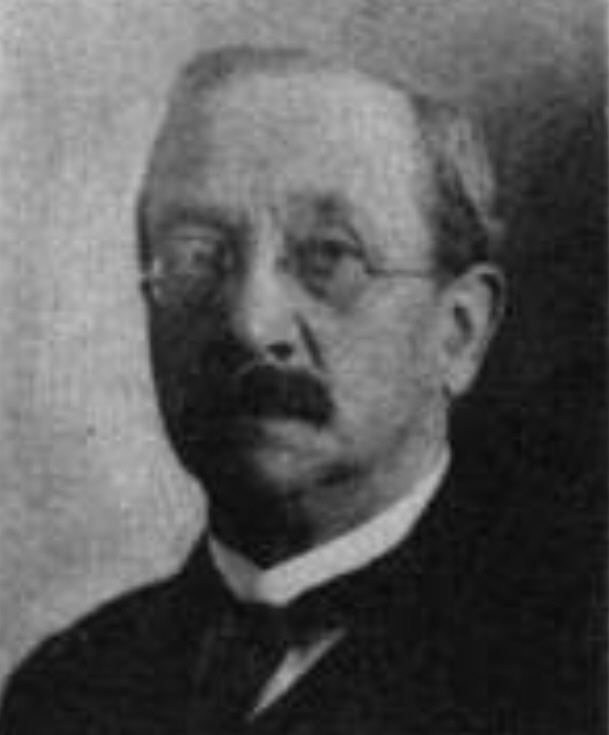
Robert Schmidt

Robert Schmidt was born in Berlin on 15 May 1864. He was apprenticed as a piano builder, and from 1890 to 1893 served as a member of the board of the association of piano builders of Berlin.

From 1893 to 1902, he was editor for the social-democratic newspaper Vorwärts.

From 1893 to 1898 and from 1903 to 1918, Schmidt was a member of the Reichstag of the German Empire for the Social Democratic Party of Germany. In 1902, he was a member of the Generalkommission of German trade unions and from 1903 to 1910 was head of the Zentral-Arbeitersekretariat.

In 1918, he became Unterstaatssekretär of the Kriegsernährungsamt. After the German Revolution, he was elected to the National Assembly of the Weimar Republic (1919–20). He remained a member of the Reichstag until 1930.

In 1919, Schmidt became Reichsernährungsminister (Minister for Alimentation/Food) in the cabinet of Ministerpräsident Philipp Scheidemann. He continued to serve in the government as Reichswirtschaftsminister (minister for Economic Affairs) in the cabinet of Gustav Bauer (1919–20). He retained this position in the cabinets of Hermann Müller, and Joseph Wirth from March 1920 to November 1922, interrupted only by the Fehrenbach cabinet (June 1920 - May 1921), which excluded the SPD. In 1923, he was vice-chancellor and minister for Reconstruction in the first cabinet of Gustav Stresemann. In 1929, he again served briefly as minister for Reconstruction in the second cabinet of Hermann Müller.

Schmidt died on 16 September 1943 in Berlin.
