= Katharina von Oheimb =

German politician

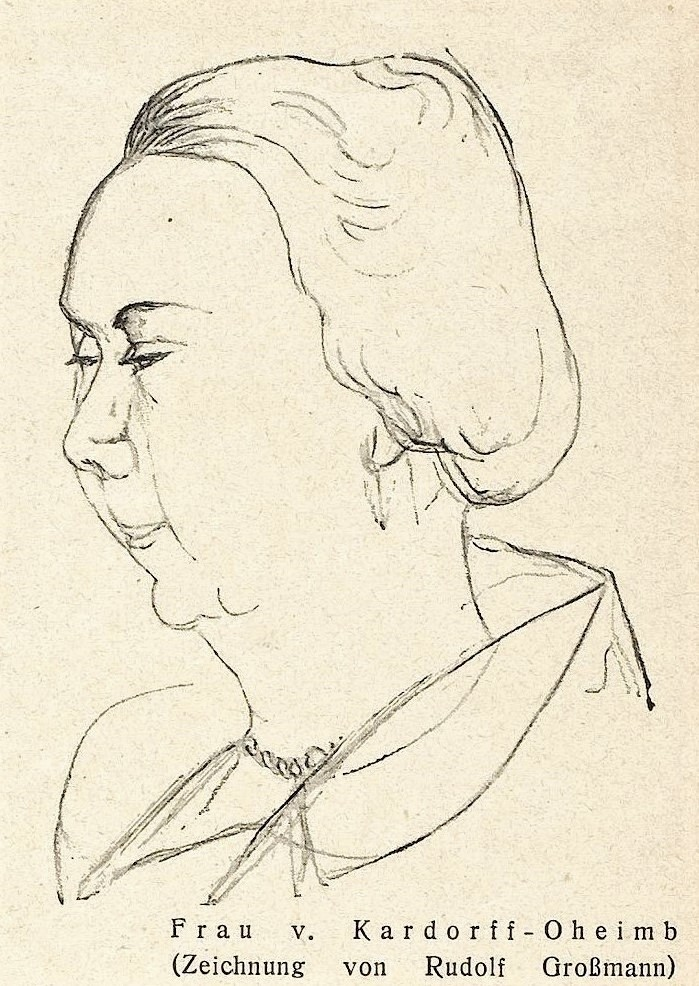
Rudolf Großmann’s wife Katharina von Kardorff-Oheimb, 1929.jpg

Katharina "Kathinka" von Oheimb, née van Endert (January 2, 1879 in Neuss – March 22, 1962 in Düsseldorf) was a German politician, publisher, and salonnière.

== Political career ==
From 1920 to 1924 Katharina von Oheimb was one of the 36 women amongst the 466 representatives of the 1. Reichstag of the Weimar Republic. Despite being a member of the national liberal German People's Party she tended toward socialist beliefs. Until 1931, she was entitled as the secretary of the Pro Palestine Committee.

During the Weimar Republic, she hosted one of the most significant political salons in Berlin. Bankers and industrialists, ministers, military personnel, and artists socialized at her house at Kurfürstendamm (1919-1926) and later in her new apartment at Matthäikirchstreet 32. Her social and political engagement comprised a variety of activities and appointments, for instance her board membership of the East Prussia Relief. She took custodianship of illegitimate children and supported orphans. She was a friend of campaigner for women's rights Minna von Caurer, with whom she founded the "Bund for Mutterschutz" (League for Maternity Protection) together with sex educator Helene Stöcker. In 1922, she started educational courses for women hoping to prepare them for their rather new suffrage and opportunities to run for political office. Amongst the invited speakers were Gustav Stresemann and Clara Mende. As a result of her visibility in society and her turbulent private life, journalist and author Kurt Tucholsky addressed her in his derogative toned poem "An Frau von Oheimb" in 1930.

== Personal life ==
Katharina von Oheimb was the daughter of the furniture and silk goods manufacturer Rudolf van Endert. After his death in 1881, her mother Elisabeth continued the proceedings. Katharina's brothers–Josef and Rudolf–later entered the business.

Katharina von Oheimb was married four times. At age 19, she married the industrialist Felix Daelen who founded the "Glyco-Metallwerke". They had three children together, however, the fourth child Paul-Felix, born in the time of their marriage, was fathered by her second husband. Nevertheless, Paul-Felix later became director of Glyco factory. She and her husband divorced in 1905, after Katharina had left the family. Her second husband, Ernst Albert, was the son of industrialist Heinrich Albert. Their daughter Elisabeth's second husband was conductor Wilhelm Furtwängler making Katharina von Oheimb the grandmother of actress Kathrin Ackermann and great-grandmother of actress Maria Furtwängler. Albert died in 1911, after a mountaineering accident in Tyrol. Katharina continued the business of his ceramic factory and married Albert's best friend, and owner of a manor, Hans Joachim von Oheimb. They divorced in 1921. In 1927, she married her former parliamentary colleague Siegfried von Kardorff, who ran for second vice president of the Reichstag.
