= Eduard Dingeldey =

German politician and lawyer (1886–1942)

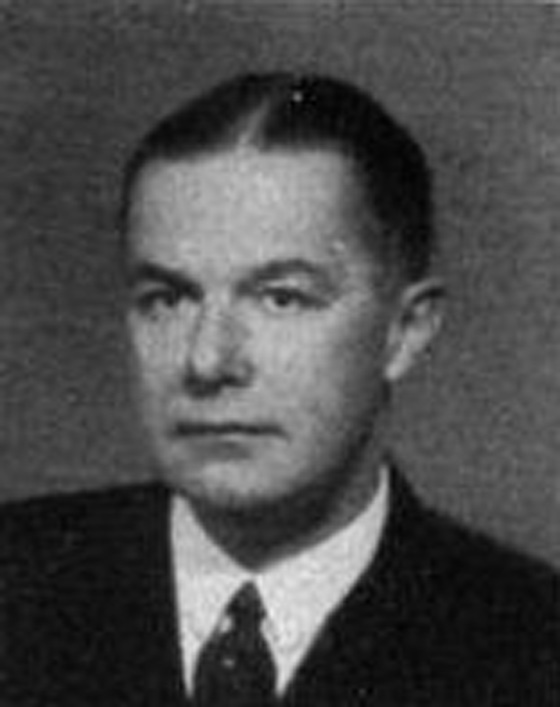

Chairman of the German People's Party
- In office 1930 – 4 July 1933
- Preceded by: Ernst Scholz
- Succeeded by: Office abolished

Member of the Reichstag
- In office May 1928 – November 1933

Personal details
- Born: 3 May 1886 Gießen, German Empire
- Died: 19 July 1942 (aged 56) Heidelberg, Nazi Germany
- Party: German People's Party
- Occupation: Politician, Lawyer

Eduard Dingeldey (27 June 1886 – 19 July 1942) was a German lawyer and politician for the German People's Party (DVP).

== Life ==
Dingeldey studied German law at universities in Heidelberg, Berlin and Gießen. He worked as lawyer in Darmstadt and since 1931 in Berlin. From May 1928 to November 1933 Dingeldey was member in Reichstag. From 1931 to end of German People's Party in 1933 he was the president of the party. After he left the Reichstag he worked again as lawyer in Berlin.

In April 1919 he married Elisabeth Hildegard Merck. His brother was politician Alfred Dingeldey.
