= Heinrich Albert (politician) =

German politician (1874–1960)

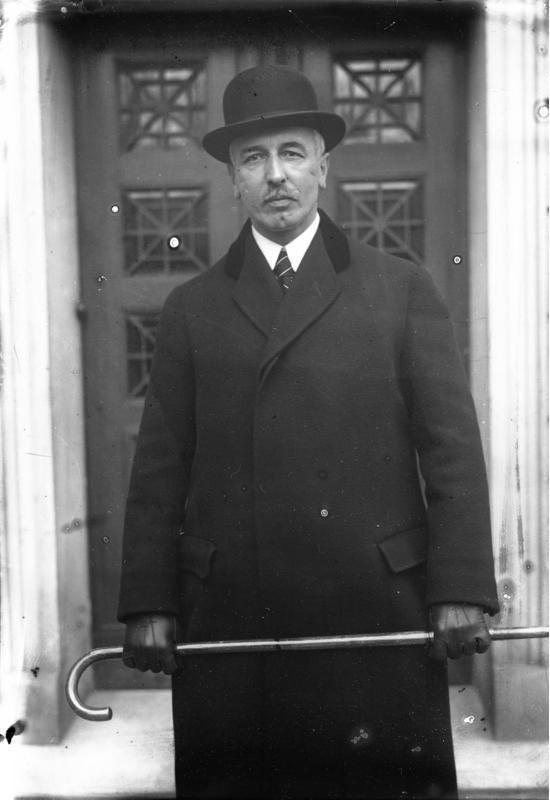

Reich Minister for Reconstruction
- In office 29 March 1923 – 12 August 1923
- Chancellor: Wilhelm Cuno
- Preceded by: Walther Rathenau
- Succeeded by: Robert Schmidt

Reich Minister of the Treasury
- In office 22 November 1922 – 1 April 1923
- Chancellor: Wilhelm Cuno
- Preceded by: Gustav Bauer
- Succeeded by: Position abolished

Chief of the Reich Chancellery
- In office 3 March 1919 – 24 May 1921
- Chancellor: Philipp Scheidemann; Gustav Bauer; Hermann Müller; Constantin Fehrenbach; Joseph Wirth
- Preceded by: Curt Baake
- Succeeded by: Arnold Brecht (acting)

Personal details
- Born: 12 February 1874 Magdeburg, Kingdom of Prussia, German Empire
- Died: 1 November 1960 (aged 86) Wiesbaden, West Germany
- Party: Independent
- Profession: Lawyer, industrialist, diplomat, politician

Heinrich Friedrich Albert (12 February 1874 – 1 November 1960) was a German civil servant, diplomat, politician, businessman and lawyer who served as minister for reconstruction and the Treasury in the government of Wilhelm Cuno in 1922/1923. During his tenure as commercial attaché to the German embassy to the U.S. in 1914–17, he was suspected of engaging in espionage and sabotage.

== Life and career ==
Heinrich (Friedrich) Albert was born on 12 February 1874 at Magdeburg in what was then the Prussian Province of Saxony (now Saxony-Anhalt), Germany. His father was a merchant.

Albert studied law and in 1895 became Referendar at Magdeburg. In 1901, he was made Assessor and then Hilfsrichter (assistant judge). In 1904, Albert joined the Reichsamt des Inneren, the German Empire's interior ministry. He was Attaché des Reichskommissars for the World's Fair at St. Louis. In 1908, he took over the same position for the fair at Brussels in 1910. Albert was promoted to Regierungsrat in 1905 and Geheimer Regierungsrat in 1908.

From 1914-17, Albert was Handelsattaché (commercial attaché) at the German embassy at Washington D.C. and later in charge of administering the property of enemy aliens in Germany.

In 1918 or 19, Albert was president of the Reichsamt zur Verwertung der nach der Demobilisierung freigewordenen Heeresgüter (national bureau for the use of army property made available by demobilisation).

In March 1919, he became Unterstaatssekretär and Chief of the Reich Chancellery, the head clerk of the German chancellor. In 1920, he became Staatssekretär. He held that position until 1921, when he was furloughed and began working as a lawyer at the Landgericht I at Berlin.

In November 1922, Wilhelm Cuno made him Reichsschatzminister (head of the Treasury) in his cabinet. As of 1 April 1923, the Reichsschatzministerium was merged with the Reichsfinanzministerium (Ministry of Finance). In late March 1923, Albert became Reichsminister für Wiederaufbau (minister for reconstruction). He remained in that office until the cabinet's resignation in August 1923.

On 25 November 1923, after the resignation of the second cabinet of Gustav Stresemann, president Friedrich Ebert asked Albert to form a new government. However, this attempt failed due to the opposition of the parties to support the independent Albert as chancellor.

Albert then opened his own law firm in 1924. He specialized in commercial law in relation to the U.S. In 1932, he became general director of the Norddeutscher Lloyd, a shipping line, a position which he held until 1933. From 1937 to 1945, Albert was chairman of the supervisory board at the German subsidiary of the Ford Motor Company. He was also member of the supervisory board at Deutsch-Atlantische Telegraphengesellschaft.

Albert died on 1 November 1960 at Wiesbaden.

== Alleged espionage activity during World War I ==
As commercial attaché to the U.S. during the early years of World War I, Albert was suspected of having engaged in illegal activities (i.e. not consistent with his diplomatic status) to weaken the U.S. and further the interests of Germany. According to a 1923 article in the tabloid New York Evening Post, Albert had spent 30 million dollars on pro-German propaganda and "was involved in schemes involving the destruction of property, agitation for strikes, German propaganda and the flotation of German financial schemes".

The FBI created a file on him.
