= Werner von Rheinbaben =

German politician (1878–1975)

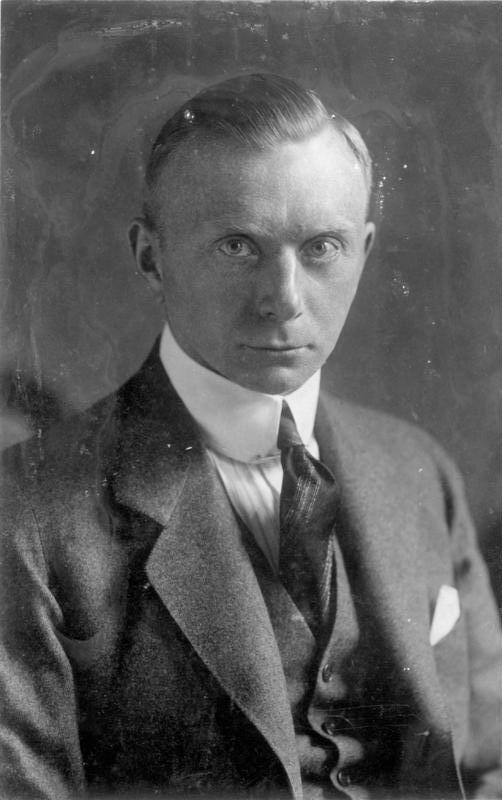
Werner von Rheinbaben in 1920

Werner Karl Ferdinand Freiherr von Rheinbaben (19 November 1878 – 14 January 1975) was a German diplomat and author.

Rheinbaben was born in Schmiedeberg, Silesia. He was a naval attaché to Rome during 1911–1913. He later wrote of the 1914 July Crisis that it was Wilhelm von Stumm who downplayed the possibility of British intervention and strongly advised the Chancellor Theobald von Bethmann Hollweg to act quickly. After the First World War, Stumm told Rheinbaben: "I erred in 1914 and advised Bethmann falsely".

Rheinbaben was a member of the German delegation to the League of Nations.

During the 1920s and early 1930s Rheinbaben was a politician belonging to the German People's Party. He was a close political associate of Gustav Stresemann and wrote a sympathetic biography of him in 1928.

In 1942 and 1943 Rheinbaben worked in Portugal on matters relating to prisoners of war for the German Red Cross.

In 1968 he argued against the views of those post-1945 German historians who claimed that Germany had sought world domination, writing: "Poor Germany! You honestly did not reach for 'world hegemony'!"
