= Gustav Bauer =

Chancellor of Germany from 1919 to 1920

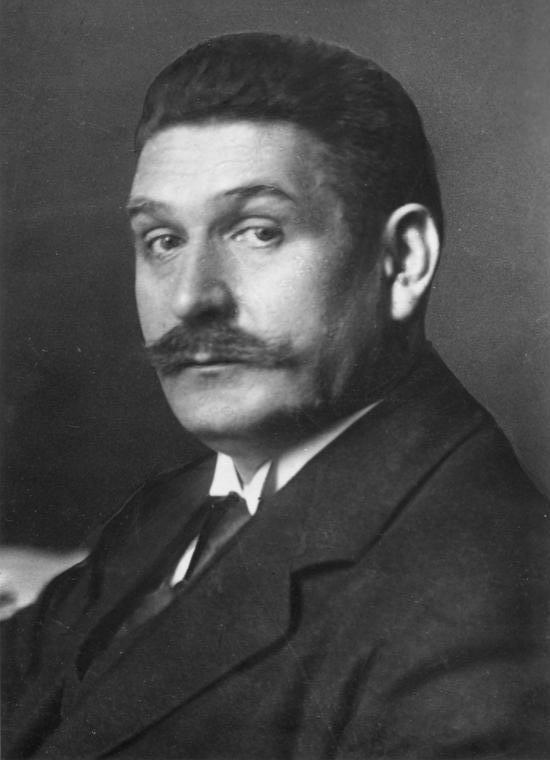
- Bauer in 1920

Chancellor of Germany (Weimar Republic)
- In office 21 June 1919 – 26 March 1920; Minister President: 21 June 1919 – 14 August 1919
- President: Friedrich Ebert
- Preceded by: Philipp Scheidemann
- Succeeded by: Hermann Müller

Vice-Chancellor of Germany
- In office 10 May 1921 – 22 November 1922
- Chancellor: Joseph Wirth
- Preceded by: Rudolf Heinze
- Succeeded by: Robert Schmidt

Minister of the Treasury
- In office 10 May 1921 – 22 November 1922
- Chancellor: Joseph Wirth
- Preceded by: Gustav Bauer
- Succeeded by: Heinrich Albert
- In office 31 January 1920 – 21 June 1920
- Chancellor: Gustav Bauer; Hermann Müller
- Preceded by: Wilhelm Mayer
- Succeeded by: Hans von Raumer

Minister of Transport
- In office 2 May 1920 – 21 June 1920
- Chancellor: Hermann Müller
- Preceded by: Johannes Bell
- Succeeded by: Wilhelm Groener

Minister of Labour
- In office 4 October 1918 – 21 June 1919; Staatssekretär: 4 October 1918 – 13 February 1919
- Chancellor: Max von Baden; Friedrich Ebert (de facto); Philipp Scheidemann
- Preceded by: Office established
- Succeeded by: Alexander Schlicke

Member of the Reichstag
- In office 24 June 1920 – 13 June 1928
- Constituency: Magdeburg

Member of the Weimar National Assembly
- In office 6 February 1919 – 21 May 1920
- Constituency: Breslau

Personal details
- Born: Gustav Adolf Bauer; 6 January 1870 Darkehmen, Province of Prussia, Kingdom of Prussia, North German Confederation
- Died: 16 September 1944 (aged 74) Berlin, Nazi Germany
- Party: Social Democratic Party
- Spouse: Hedwig Moch

Gustav Adolf Bauer (6 January 1870 – 16 September 1944) was a German Social Democratic Party leader and the chancellor of Germany from June 1919 to March 1920. Prior to that, he was minister of labour in the last cabinet of the German Empire and during most of the German Revolution that preceded the formal establishment of the Weimar Republic.

Bauer became minister president of the Weimar National Assembly in June 1919 after Philipp Scheidemann resigned in protest against the Treaty of Versailles. Following the adoption of the Weimar Constitution in August 1919, Bauer's title formally changed to "chancellor". During his term of office, a crucial tax restructuring was enacted, as were a series of important social reforms that affected unemployment relief, maternity benefits and health and old age insurance.

After his cabinet fell in March 1920 as a result of its response to the Kapp Putsch, Bauer served as vice-chancellor, minister of the treasury, and minister of transportation in other cabinets from May 1920 to November 1922. In 1925, he was forced to resign his seat in the Reichstag due to his involvement in the fraud and bribery of the Barmat scandal. He was allowed to resume his seat in 1926. He kept it until 1928, when he retired from public life.

== Early life ==
Bauer was born on 6 January 1870 in Darkehmen, near Königsberg in the Province of Prussia (now Ozyorsk, Kaliningrad Oblast, Russia) as the son of court bailiff Gustav Bauer and his wife Henriette (née Gross). From 1876 to 1884, he attended primary school in Königsberg. After 1884, he worked as an office assistant and then as head clerk for a lawyer at Königsberg.

In 1895, he became president of the Union of Office Employees of Germany, a white-collar union that he co-founded. He was also editor of the publication Der Büroangestellte ("The Office Worker") and in 1903 was named head of the Central Labour Secretariat of the Free Trade Unions in Berlin. In 1908, Bauer became the second chairman of the General Commission of Trade Unions in Berlin, a position he held until 1918.

On 2 October 1911, Bauer married Hedwig Moch.

== Political career ==
=== Imperial Germany and the revolutionary period ===
In 1912, Bauer was elected to the Reichstag for the Social Democratic Party of Germany (SPD) in a constituency of Breslau in the Prussian province of Silesia. In October 1918, he became state secretary (similar to a minister) in the Ministry of Labour in the cabinet of Max von Baden, a position he remained in throughout the Revolution of 1918–1919. After Baden resigned on 9 November 1918, Bauer continued to serve under Chancellor Friedrich Ebert (SPD) and then under the Council of the People's Deputies, also headed by Ebert, which replaced the imperial chancellorship.

On 12 November 1918, the Council issued an appeal "To the German People" that included a number of promises related to labour, notably the introduction of the eight-hour workday and the creation and protection of jobs. In the following weeks, the Council issued decrees regulating the hiring, dismissal and pay of industrial workers, including war invalids and demobilised military personnel. In the Stinnes–Legien Agreement of 15 November, industry agreed to introduce the eight-hour workday, guarantee demobilised workers the right to their pre-war jobs and recognise trade unions as the sole representatives of the workers.

=== Weimar Republic ===
==== Chancellor ====
In January 1919, Bauer was elected to the Weimar National Assembly for Magdeburg in Prussian Saxony. In February, he became minister of labour in Philipp Scheidemann's cabinet, Germany's first democratically elected national government. After Scheidemann resigned on 20 June 1919 in protest against the terms of the Treaty of Versailles, both Eduard David and Hermann Müller of the Social Democrats refused the offer to succeed him as minister president. Bauer accepted the position on 20 June, even though he had until then been a vocal critic of the Treaty. Part of his willingness to take on the difficult responsibility of getting the Treaty through the Assembly came from his personal friendship with Friedrich Ebert and part from a sense of duty: "We are not standing here out of the interest of our parties, and even less – believe me – out of ambition. We are standing here out of a feeling of responsibility, in the awareness that it is our damned duty to save what can be saved." The National Assembly approved the Treaty 237 to 138 on 23 June, and representatives of Bauer's government signed it on 28 June.

On 31 July, the Assembly passed the proposal for the Weimar Constitution that it had drawn up and debated. President Ebert signed it on 11 August, and when it came into force on 14 August, Bauer's position took the name "chancellor". The National Assembly dissolved itself on 21 May 1920. After the Reichstag election on 6 June 1920, the Republic's first Reichstag took its place.

Some of the most far-reaching changes implemented during Bauer's term of office were the tax reform packages developed by Finance Minister Matthias Erzberger. The Reich Revenue Law of July 1919 gave the federal government sole authority for levying and administering taxes, unlike under the Empire, when the states had control. The result was a considerable strengthening of the Reich's position with respect to the constituent states. Erzberger's measures also attempted to shift the burden of taxes more towards wealthier citizens. They levied "war taxes" on income and wealth, imposed an inheritance tax in July 1919 and a one-time wealth tax in December 1919.

The Bauer cabinet was also responsible for a number of extensions of social benefits. They included maternity care covering the costs of childbirth and confinement, youth welfare, increased unemployment relief (a form of welfare not to be confused with unemployment insurance, which was not introduced in Germany until 1927) and expanded health and old age insurance. In addition, the Factory Council Act of February 1920 established works councils at workplaces with 20 or more employees as a means of improving lines of communication between labour and management.

In March 1920, the participants in the Kapp Putsch attempted to depose the government in Berlin. Bauer, along with other SPD members of the cabinet and President Ebert, signed a call for a general strike against the putsch. After a Freikorps unit took control of the government buildings in Berlin and Wolfgang Kapp set himself up as head of a new government, most of the cabinet left the city for Dresden and then Stuttgart. Some ministers, led by Vice-Chancellor Eugen Schiffer, remained in the capital and negotiated with the putschists. The putsch quickly collapsed due to the general strike and the refusal of government employees to do their work, but the Bauer government was forced to resign on 27 March, mostly as a result of the negotiations conducted with Kapp and his fellow conspirators. Bauer was succeeded as chancellor by Hermann Müller of the SPD.

==== Post-chancellorship ====
Bauer joined the new cabinet as minister of the treasury, a position he held until June 1920; from May to June 1920, he was also minister of transportation. In the Reichstag elections of June 1920, he was re-elected to parliament, but the new government that Constantin Fehrenbach (Centre Party) formed on 25 June did not include the SPD, whose share of the vote had dropped from 38% in 1919 to 22%.

Bauer rejoined the government in the cabinet of Joseph Wirth (Centre Party) in May 1921 as minister of the treasury and vice-chancellor. He held the positions throughout Wirth's term of office (until November 1922). Bauer remained a member of the Reichstag for Magdeburg and retained his seat after leaving the government.

In November 1924, he became involved in the Barmat scandal, which involved accusations of corruption, war profiteering, fraud and bribery against the SPD due to its alleged involvement with the merchant Julius Barmat. Bauer was accused of taking commissions from Barmat, a claim he consistently denied in spite of strong evidence against him. On 7 February 1925, the SPD parliamentary group forced him to relinquish his seat in the Reichstag. On 14 February, he was expelled from the party.

The expulsion was overturned on 14 May 1926. He returned to the Reichstag, retaining his seat until 1928, at which point he left parliament and retired from public life.

== Later life ==
Five months after the Nazi Party took power, Bauer was arrested (29 June 1933) for supposedly having misappropriated public funds. The charge was based on statements allegedly made in school by his son. When it was ascertained that Bauer's marriage was childless, he was released after a week in custody. The proceedings against him were not dismissed until 1935.

Bauer died in Hermsdorf (Berlin Reinickendorf) on 16 September 1944.

== Literature ==
- Braun, Bernd: Die Reichskanzler der Weimarer Republik. Zwölf Lebensläufe in Bildern. Droste, Düsseldorf 2011, pp. 100–133. ISBN 978-3-7700-5308-7
- Mayer, Paul (1953). "Bauer, Gustav Adolf". Neue Deutsche Biographie (in German). Vol. 1. Berlin: Duncker & Humblot. p. 638. (full text online).
- Rintelen, Karlludwig: Ein undemokratischer Demokrat: Gustav Bauer. Gewerkschaftsführer – Freund Friedrich Eberts – Reichskanzler. Eine politische Biographie, Lang, Frankfurt/M. 1993, ISBN 3-631-45299-3 (the only biography of Gustav Bauers and a very critical account)
- Voigt, Martin: "Gustav Adolf Bauer". pp. 177–190. In: Wilhelm v. Sternburg (Hrsg.): Die deutschen Kanzler. Von Bismarck bis Schmidt. Königstein/Taunus: Athenäum 1985. ISBN 3-7610-8382-3

Political offices
Preceded by None	Labour Minister of Germany; 1918 – 1919	Succeeded by Alexander Schlicke
Preceded by Philipp Scheidemann	Chancellor of Germany; 1919 – 1920	Succeeded by Hermann Müller
Preceded by Johannes Bell	Transportation Minister of Germany; 1920	Succeeded by Wilhelm Groener
Preceded by Rudolf Heinze	Vice Chancellor of Germany; 1921 – 1922	Succeeded by Robert Schmidt
