= Johann Becker (politician) =

German lawyer and politician (1869–1951)

Reich Minister of Economics
- In office 22 November 1922 – 12 August 1923
- Chancellor: Wilhelm Cuno
- Preceded by: Robert Schmidt
- Succeeded by: Hans von Raumer

Member of the Reichstag
- In office 24 June 1920 – 18 July 1930
- Constituency: Hessen-Darmstadt (1920-1928); National list (1928-1930)

Member of the National Assembly
- In office 6 February 1919 – 21 May 1920
- Constituency: Hessen-Darmstadt

Personal details
- Born: 3 February 1869 Ludwigshöhe, Grand Duchy of Hesse
- Died: 17 October 1951 (aged 82) Ludwigshöhe, West Germany
- Party: German People's Party
- Other political affiliations: National Liberal Party (until 1918)
- Spouse: Johanna Caroline Hartmann
- Profession: Lawyer, politician

Johann Becker (3 February 1869 – 17 October 1951) was a German lawyer and politician of the German People's Party. From January 1916 to November 1918 he served as finance minister of the Grand Duchy of Hesse. He was elected a member of the Weimar National Assembly in 1919. He continued to serve as a delegate in the Reichstag until 1930. In 1922/1923 he was Minister of Economics, under Chancellor Wilhelm Cuno, during the onset of hyperinflation.

== Life and career ==
Johann Baptist (also: Johannes) Becker was born on 3 February 1869 at Ludwigshöhe in the Grand Duchy of Hesse (present-day Rhineland-Palatinate, Germany). His father, Franz Becker, was a builder and winemaker from a peasant family. His mother was Elisabetha, née Schaad.

Becker married Johanna Caroline Hartmann on 4 September 1895 at Gießen. They had one daughter.

He studied at Gießen, Leipzig, Munich and Berlin. He then joined the civil service of the Grand Duchy of Hesse where he advanced rapidly. From January 1916 to November 1918, he was the Hessian minister of finance. His achievements in Hesse included the reform of the tax system (1899) which eliminated the Realsteuern and brought the system into line with that of Prussia. He also was the main inspiration behind the reform of the Hessian communal tax system (1911). In addition, Becker was very interested in the set-up and running of the railway system.

In 1919, he was elected to the Weimar National Assembly, the new republic's constituent assembly. From 1920 to 1930, Becker was a member of the Reichstag for the German People's Party (DVP). He was also member of the board of directors of the Rheinische Stahlwerke Duisburg-Meiderich.

On the suggestion of Gustav Stresemann and Rudolf Heinze, Becker was made Reichswirtschaftsminister (minister of economics) when the cabinet of Wilhelm Cuno was formed in November 1922. Due to his connections with Rhenish industry he was attacked by the parties of the left but did not exert any influence to further the interest of heavy industry whilst in office.

During the Occupation of the Ruhr, he remained a supporter of "passive resistance" against the French and Belgian occupation forces until the end, even as it caused the German economy to spiral downward and inflation to accelerate. He prepared the stabilization of the currency that came with the introduction of the Rentenmark in October 1923. However, the cabinet resigned in August and Becker was not in office any more when that reform actually took place.

He died on 17 October 1951 at Ludwigshöhe.

== Works ==
- Die Neugestaltung des Gemeindeumlagewesens in Hessen, in: FinanzArchiv, ed. by G. Schanz, Jg. 29, Vol. 1, 1912, pp. 112–68
- Finanzwirtschaftliche Fragen, Aufklärungs-Schriften der deutschen Volkspartei in Hessen H. 5, 1919
- "Neujahrsartikel", in: Die Zeit, ed. by Gustav Stresemann, 1923
