= Reich Ministry for Reconstruction =

Weimar Germany ministry

The Reich Ministry for Reconstruction (German: Reichsministerium für Wiederaufbau) was a cabinet-level ministry during the early years of the Weimar Republic. Its central task was to implement the economic reparations required of Germany by the Treaty of Versailles. The ministry was established by a decree of President Friedrich Ebert on 7 November 1919 and dissolved by another decree that he issued on 24 May 1924.

== Tasks ==
Article 232 of the Treaty of Versailles required that Germany and its allies "make compensation for all damage done to the civilian population of the Allied and Associated Powers and to their property during the period of the belligerency". The Reich Ministry for Reconstruction, which was responsible for complying with the Treaty's requirements as they affected Germany, consisted exclusively of subordinate agencies that were detached from the areas of responsibility of other ministries. The Ministry for Reconstruction itself was only the final decision-making authority and supervised the work of the affiliated agencies.

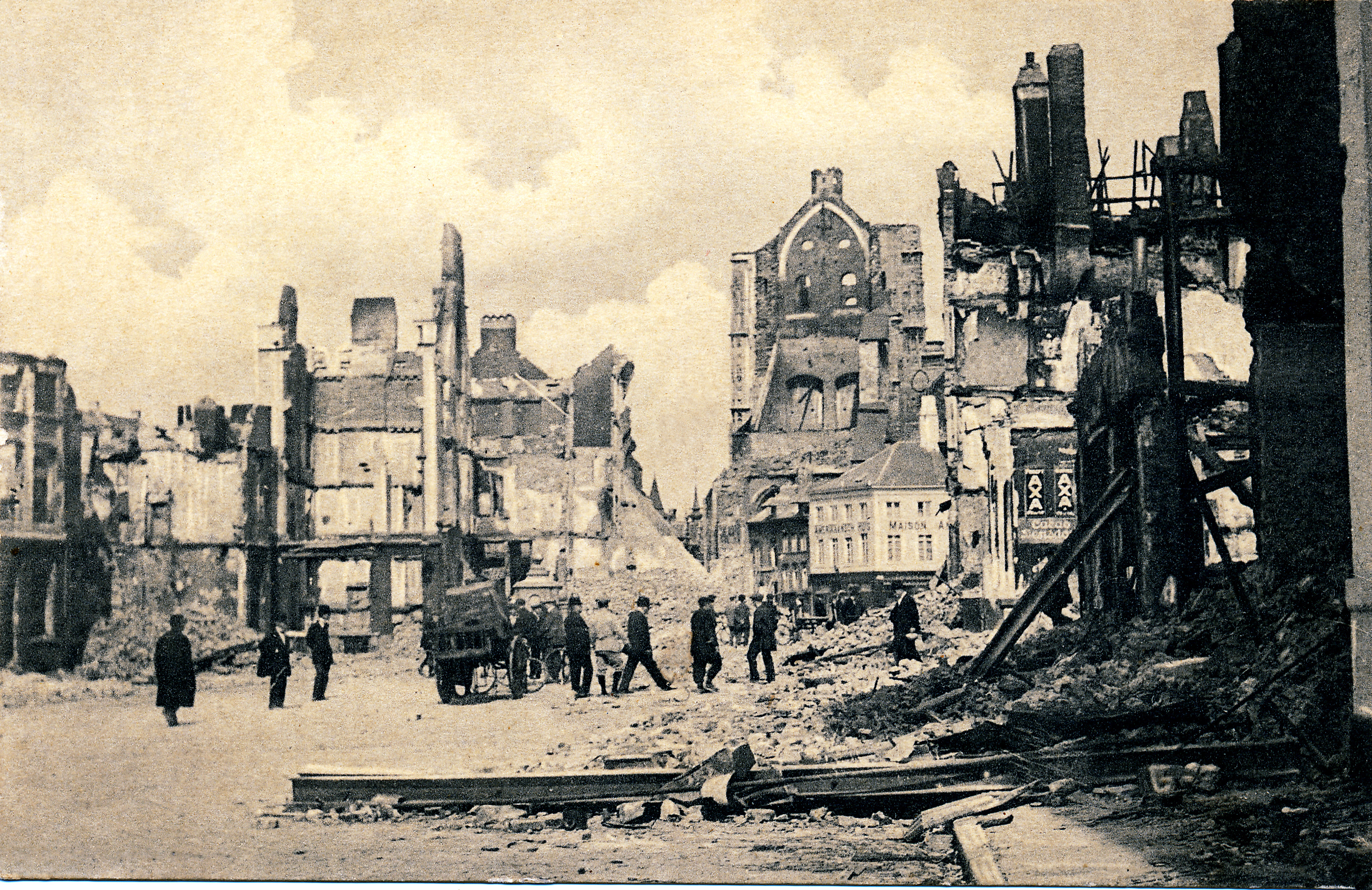
War damage in Louvain, Belgium, 1914

In 1919 Germany had plans for direct participation in reconstruction of the areas of Belgium and France devastated by the war. German labor and companies were to reduce the German reparations burden through direct reconstruction work and supplies of building materials, while at the same time bringing Germany closer to France. The plans failed, in large part due to opposition from France. In the end, Germany supplied only reparation goods such as building materials, furnishings, industrial equipment and especially coal.

The remnants of the German merchant fleet, almost half of which had been lost to enemy action and seizure during the First World War, were ceded almost entirely to the Allied and Associated Powers in the course of the extension of the Armistice and under the Treaty of Versailles. While the war was still in progress, Germany's leadership had decided to replace the losses to the merchant fleet after the war in order to facilitate Germany's return to the world market. The Reich Ministry for Reconstruction took over the institutions and organizations created for the purpose.

Germany itself had suffered only slight damage during the war. The consequences of the battles for East Prussia had been largely eliminated while the war was still ongoing. More extensive damage caused by isolated air raids remained the exception. The main internal German reconstruction effort was the integration and compensation of hundreds of thousands of Germans living abroad who streamed into Germany as refugees or displaced persons beginning in late 1918. They included Germans from ceded territories such as Alsace–Lorraine (to France), Eupen-Malmedy (to Belgium), Posen and West Prussia (most of both to the Second Polish Republic) and the German colonial empire. A large number of Germans who had been interned all over the world during the war were also deported to Germany after its end. The refugees and displaced persons had to be adequately compensated for their losses in order to enable them to make a new start in Germany, a task which was also assigned to the Reich Ministry for Reconstruction.

Germany had dismantled and removed a considerable amount of material from occupied territory during the war, all of which was to be returned. Hundreds of thousands of tons of machinery and other objects had to be packed and transported from Germany. Extensive logistics were developed for the purpose. Financial obligations involving the private movement of capital had also accumulated between Germany and its enemies during the war. Loans, for example, could not be repaid due to capital controls. By the end of the war, such obligations had grown to several billion gold marks. The Treaty of Versailles therefore laid down a compensation procedure for claims and debts, the execution of which was transferred to the Ministry of Reconstruction.

Enemy assets in Germany had also been confiscated and companies liquidated. At the war's end, the task of reversing the actions and compensating the victims fell to the Ministry. In addition, it took over the budget, staff and premises of the Imperial Colonial Office, which, as the Colonial Central Administration, was responsible for dismantling the German colonial empire.

The Ministry was disbanded by presidential decree in May 1924.

== Structure ==
The Reich Ministry for Reconstruction was housed in the former headquarters of the Imperial Colonial Office at Wilhelmstraße 62 in Berlin. The following authorities were assigned to the Ministry:

Department	Established	Closed
Reich Commission for Compensation (incorporated in 1919)	26 April 1915	31 March 1922
Reich Commission for the Liquidation of Foreign Enterprises ( incorporated in 1919)	24 September 1916	31 March 1923
Trustee for enemy assets (incorporated in 1919)	19 April 1917	29 September 1923
Reich Committee for the Reconstruction of the Merchant Fleet ( incorporated in 1919)	7 November 1917	25 August 1923
Reich Commission for the Execution of Reconstruction Work in the Destroyed Regions		
Reich Restitution Commission		
German Coal Commission in Essen		
Reich Office of Equalization		
Reich and State Commissioner for the Investigation of Damages Due to Uprisings in Upper Silesia		
Reich Commission for Foreign Claims		
Reich Compensation Office for War Damage		
German Commission on War Burdens		

== Ministers ==
Minister	Took office	Left office	Party
Otto Gessler	25 October 1919	27 March 1920	DDP
Walther Rathenau	10 May 1920	26 October 1921	DDP
Heinrich Albert	29 March 1923	12 August 1923	Independent
Robert Schmidt	13 August 1923	3 November 1923	SPD

Between 1920 and 1924, State Secretary Gustav Müller repeatedly took over management of the affairs of the Reich Ministry for Reconstruction, since frequently no Reich minister was appointed.
