= Ernst Scholz (politician, born 1874) =

German lawyer and politician (1874–1932)

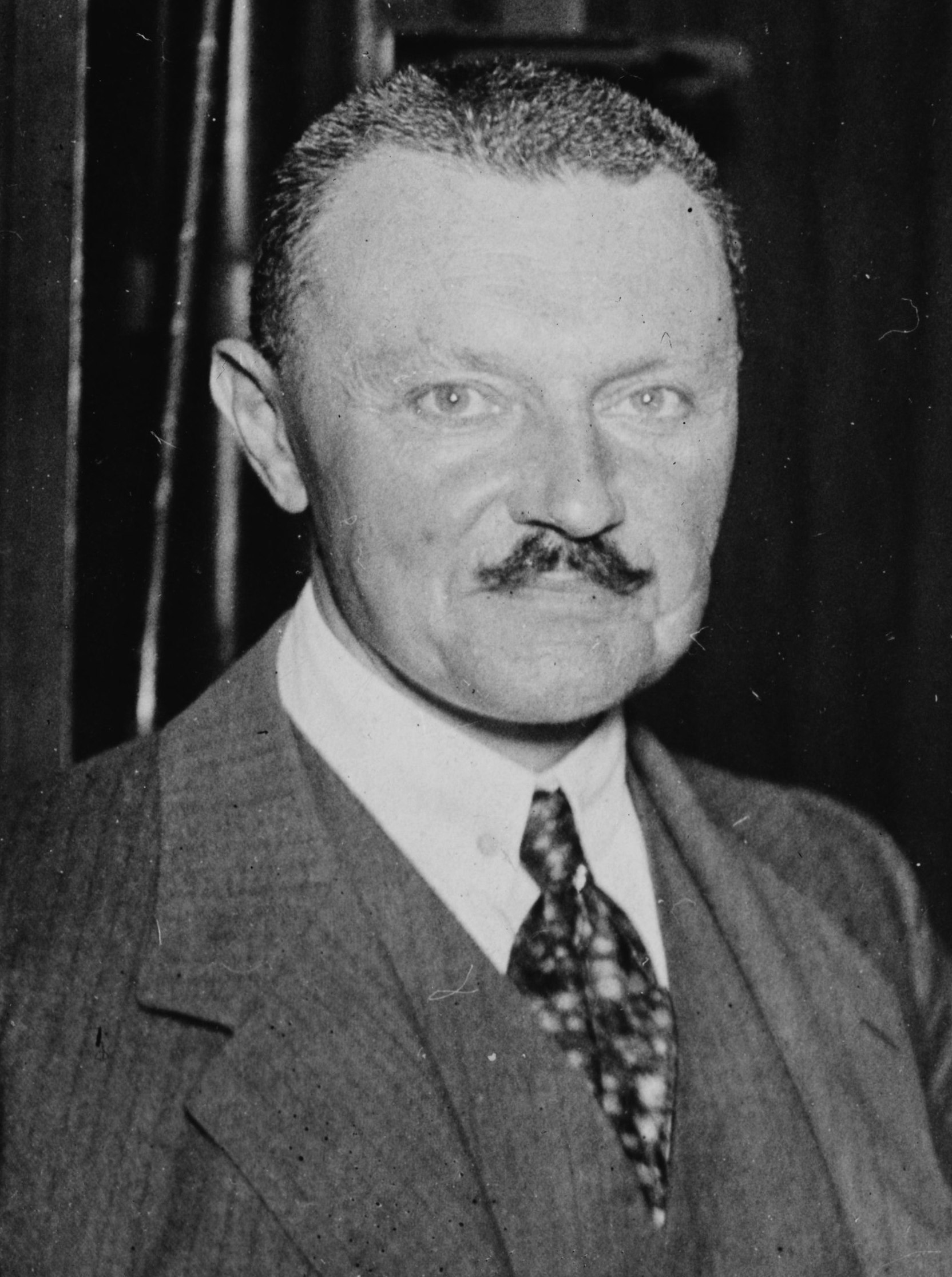

Chairman of the German People's Party
- In office 1929–1930
- Preceded by: Gustav Stresemann
- Succeeded by: Eduard Dingeldey

Reich Minister of Economics
- In office 25 June 1920 – 10 May 1921
- Chancellor: Constantin Fehrenbach
- Preceded by: Robert Schmidt
- Succeeded by: Robert Schmidt

Member of the Reichstag
- In office 1921–1930
- Constituency: Ostpreußen (1921–1930); National list (1930)

Personal details
- Born: 3 May 1874 Wiesbaden, Hesse-Nassau, Prussia, German Empire
- Died: 26 June 1932 (aged 58) Berlin, Weimar Republic
- Party: German People's Party
- Education: Heidelberg University
- Occupation: Politician, Lawyer

Ernst Scholz (3 May 1874 – 26 June 1932) was a German lawyer as well a politician in the Weimar Republic. He was chairman of the German People's Party (DVP) after the death of Gustav Stresemann and a member of the Reichstag from 1921 to 1931.

== Early life and career ==
Born to a judicial council in Wiesbaden, Scholz graduated grammar school and pursued law as a career. He began his studies at the University of Freiburg and became a member of the Corps Suevia Freiburg, later moving to the University of Marburg. Finally, in 1895, Scholz graduated from Heidelberg University, thus completing his academic career and earning him a Doctorate in law.

In 1899, Scholz became a civil Assessor and in 1900, he became the First Secretary of the General Cooperative Association (Allgemeinen Genossenschaftsverbands) in Charlottenburg. He also travelled to Frankfurt in 1901 as a municipal assistant. Scholz was a veteran of the First World War, enlisting in the Reichswehr in 1914, getting wounded that same year and earning the position of major before retiring.

Scholz wrote about German mortgage law and the municipal taxation system in Prussia as well as authoring a legal book for cooperatives. From 1922 to 1929 he chaired the Professional Association of Senior Municipal Officials in Germany. He began his political career in 1919, joining the German People's Party (DVP), a party he remained in until his death. After the sudden death of long-time DVP leader, Gustav Stresemann, Scholz took over as president. However, he resigned in 1930 for health reasons, being replaced by Eduard Dingeldey, who would remain leader until the party's dissolution in 1933.

Also active in many municipal governments, Scholz was the assistant minister and treasurer in both his birthplace of Wiesbaden (from 1902 to 1909) and Düsseldorf (from 1902 to 1912). From 1912 to 1913 he was the lord mayor of Kassel and from 1913 to 1914 and 1917–1920 he was the lord mayor of Charlottenburg, being the last person to hold that position in the city, as it was later incorporated in the Berlin. As a member of the "Lord Mayor Group" (OB-Fraktion), Scholz was a member of the Prussian House of Lords from 1912 to 1918.

On 25 June 1920, Scholz assumed the position of Reich Minister of Economics in the Fehrenbach cabinet until 10 May 1921. Scholz was then elected to the Reichstag in the East Prussia constituency (constituency 1) on 7 March 1921, where he remained until 1931. He retired from the Reichstag in 1931, presumably for health reasons; this signalled the end of his political career. He died a year later in Berlin, aged 58,

== Awards and honours ==
- Honorary Degree (Dr. -Ing. e. H.) in engineering
- Scholzplatz in Berlin-Charlottenburg (1931) dedicated to him (Scholz-platz)
