= Clara Mende =

German politician (1869–1947)

Member of the Reichstag
- In office 1920–1928

Member of the Weimar National Assembly
- In office 1919–1920

Personal details
- Born: 12 April 1869; Erfurt, Prussia
- Died: 1947

Clara Mende (12 April 1869 – 1947) was a German teacher and politician. In 1919 she was one of the 36 women elected to the Weimar National Assembly, the first female parliamentarians in Germany. She remained a member of parliament until 1928.

== Biography ==
Mende was born Clara Völker in Erfurt, in the Prussian Province of Saxony in 1869, the daughter of railway official Otto Völker. After attending a girls high school in Jena, she attended a teaching seminary in the same town. She then took a language teacher exam in London. Between 1901 and 1905 she studied history at the Humboldt University of Berlin. She began working as a teacher for the Prussian state government in 1904 and married Friedrich Mende. She became involved with the National Liberal Party (NLP) and edited Die Frau in der Politik (The Woman in Politics), a supplement to the party's newspaper, Deutsche Stimmen (German Voices).

In 1918 Mende was one of the founders of the German People's Party (DVP), the main successor to the NLP. The following year, she was elected to the Weimar National Assembly as a representative of the DVP. She was re-elected in the 1920 Reichstag elections and retained her seat in the May and December 1924 elections, remaining a member of parliament until 1928. From 1928 to 1933 she worked as a representative for housekeepers in the Ministry of Economics. She died in 1947.
