= Hans von Raumer =

German politician (1870–1965)

Reich Minister of Economics
- In office 13 August 1923 – 6 October 1923
- Chancellor: Gustav Stresemann
- Preceded by: Johann Becker
- Succeeded by: Joseph Koeth

Reich Minister of the Treasury
- In office 25 June 1920 – 10 May 1921
- Chancellor: Constantin Fehrenbach
- Preceded by: Gustav Bauer
- Succeeded by: Joseph Koeth

Member of the Reichstag
- In office 24 June 1920 – 18 July 1930
- Constituency: Berlin

Personal details
- Born: Hans Friedrich Wilhem Ernst von Raumer; 10 January 1870 Dessau, North German Confederation
- Died: 3 November 1965 (aged 95) Berlin, Federal Republic of Germany (West Germany)
- Party: German People's Party
- Profession: Politician

Hans Friedrich Wilhelm Ernst von Raumer (10 January 1870 – 3 November 1965) was a German politician of the German People's Party (DVP). He served as minister in two governments of the Weimar Republic and was also active as a representative of German industry.

== Early life ==
Hans von Raumer was born on 10 January 1870 in Dessau as the son of Friedrich von Raumer (1831-1911), a major in the Prussian Army and his wife Marie (née von Studnitz, 1843-1928). He had three brothers. Since his father was a war cripple, the family only had a modest income. Hans attended the Gymnasium at Hirschberg (Silesia) and at Görlitz and went on to the Ritterakademie at Liegnitz. After 1890 he studied law and government at Lausanne, Leipzig and Berlin, finishing with a Dr.iur.

Raumer married Stephanie (1882-1949, daughter of Stephan Gans zu Putlitz) at Belgrad in 1905. They had one son and two daughters.

== Career in the German Empire ==
A civil servant since 1899 (Regierungsassessor), Raumer became Landrat of the district Wittlage (Westfalen). He left public service in 1911 and became director of Hannoversche Kolonisations- und Moorverwertungsgesellschaft, an electricity plant at Osnabrück. From 1915 he was director of the Bund der Elektrizitätsversorgungs-Unternehmungen Deutschlands (the association of German power-generating utilities) at Berlin. From late 1916 until March 1918 he served as Kriegsreferent at the Reichsschatzamt (Imperial Treasury). In this position, he drafted the Kohlensteuergesetz (law on coal tax). In March 1918, Raumer along with Walther Rathenau and Carl Friedrich von Siemens created the Zentralverband der Deutschen elektrotechnischen Industrie (association of German electrotechnical industry) at Berlin. As executive director until 1933, Raumer was very influential in setting the association's course.

== Career after the German Revolution ==
As the end of World War I approached, Raumer worked to facilitate a frictionless transition from a war to a peacetime economy. To this end he invited representatives of industry (Siemens, Rathenau, Felix Deutsch, Anton von Rieppel) and of the unions (Carl Legien, Gustav Bauer, August Schlieke, Theodor Leipart) to a meeting in October 1918. This resulted, one month later, in the creation of the Zentralarbeitsgemeinschaft (ZAG), which established the formal equality of employers and employees and fixed the length of the working day at eight hours. Raumer was a member of the board of the ZAG as well as of the board of the Reichsverband der Deutschen Industrie.

From 1920 to 1930, Raumer was a member of the Reichstag for the right wing of the DVP. From June 1920 to May 1921, he was Reichsschatzminister (Treasury) in the cabinet of Constantin Fehrenbach. He focused on the question of war reparations - into his tenure fell the Spa Conference of July 1920, the interruption of negotiations by the Allies in January 1921 and the occupation of Duisburg and Düsseldorf in March 1921.

Raumer continued to serve as an advisor to the government on economic issues. Together with Rudolf Hilferding he was a technical expert on the German delegation at the Genoa Conference of 1922. Having established contacts to the Soviet negotiators Karl Radek and Georgy Chicherin there, he subsequently pushed Rathenau to agree to the Treaty of Rapallo.

From August to October 1923, Raumer served as Reichswirtschaftsminister in the second cabinet of Gustav Stresemann.

Raumer worked to strengthen German-Soviet economic ties through his work in the Reichstag as well as member of the board of the Rußlandausschusses der deutschen Industrie and of the supervisory board of the Industriefinanzierungsgesellschaft Ost. After 1929, Raumer was a chairman of the German-Soviet arbitration commission. He also brought together German industrialists and Soviet leaders like Anastas Mikoyan, helping to establish German contributions to the Soviet Five Year Plan and, in 1931, landing Soviet orders from the German electrotechnical and machinery industries totalling 900 million Reichsmark.

Raumer was a friend of the French ambassador André François-Poncet and supported Heinrich Brüning's policy of economic rappraochment with France. However, after the government of Brüning fell, Raumer also supported the policies of Kurt von Schleicher.

== Later life and death ==
In 1933, Raumer resigned from all positions. He had left the DVP in March 1932, but kept his distance to the NSDAP.

In 1941, he was chairman of the supervisory board of Königstadt AG für Grundstücke und Industrie Berlin and member of the supervisory boards at Berlin-Gubener Hufabrik AG, Elektrowerke AG Berlin, Gesellschaft für elektrische Unternehmungen Berlin, Koblenzer Elektrizitäts- und Verkehrs-AG as well as at the Steatit-Magnesia AG and at the Verkaufskredit AG Berlin.

Raumer's home was destroyed in 1943 by Allied bombing and he moved to Großlangewiesche (Priegnitz) and then to Dätzingen. In 1962, he returned to West-Berlin.

Raumer died there on 3 November 1965. He is buried at Dätzingen.

== Works ==
- Dreißig Jahre nach Rapallo, in: Deutsche Rundschau 78, H. 4, April 1952
- Unternehmer und Gewerkschaften in der Weimarer Zeit, in: Deutsche Rundschau 80, H. 5, May 1954
- Die Zentralarbeitsgemeinschaft, in: Der Weg zum industriellen Spitzenverband, 1956, pp. 102–17.
