= German People's Party =

German People's Party Deutsche Volkspartei
- Leader: Gustav Stresemann (first); Ernst Scholz (second); Eduard Dingeldey (third)
- Founded: 15 December 1918; 107 years ago
- Dissolved: July 4, 1933; 93 years ago
- Preceded by: National Liberal Party; Free Conservative Party (moderate elements)
- Merged into: Free Democratic Party (not legal successor)
- Headquarters: Berlin
- Membership (1920): 800,000
- Ideology: National liberalism; Conservative liberalism; Liberal conservatism; Economic liberalism; Civic nationalism (Note: Was reported to be anti-semitic.); Constitutional monarchism
- Political position: Before 1929: Centre-right; After 1929: Right-wing
- Colors: Gold (customary); Black White Red (imperial colors)

The German People's Party (German: Deutsche Volkspartei, DVP) was a conservative-liberal political party during the Weimar Republic that was the successor to the National Liberal Party of the German Empire. Along with the left-liberal German Democratic Party (DDP), it represented political liberalism in Germany between 1918 and 1933.

The party's best known politician was its founding chairman and later Chancellor and Foreign Minister Gustav Stresemann. With the exception of two short-lived cabinets in 1921 and 1922, the DVP was represented in all Weimar governments from 1920 to 1931. In the late 1920s it turned more to the right politically but could not compete with other nationalist parties, and by 1932 the DVP's share of the vote had shrunk to barely over one percent. The party disbanded shortly after the Nazis' seizure of power in 1933.

== History ==
=== Foundation ===
Following the end of World War I and the collapse of the German Empire, the party system in Germany largely remained in place because the groups with a common religion, social status, culture, etc. had for the most part survived. In the political center, there were strong efforts by both the Progressive People's Party (FVP) and the National Liberal Party (NLP) to overcome the historical split between "democrats" (more left-liberal, as the FVP) and "liberals" (more to the right, as the NLP), and to form a larger, middle class democratic party. Economist and banker Hjalmar Schacht, economist and sociologist Alfred Weber and journalist and editor Theodor Wolff were the driving forces.

At the beginning of the 1918 November Revolution that brought down the German Empire, party leaders Gustav Stresemann (NLP) and Otto Fischbeck (FVP) also discussed such possibilities. Negotiations between the two parties began on 15 November 1918, and on the same day they agreed on a program that required significant concessions from the NLP, including a commitment to a republic as the future form of government. On 16 November representatives of both parties issued an Appeal for the Formation of a German Democratic Party. For the first time it seemed possible to unite the middle class non-sectarian forces in Germany. When Stresemann asked Weber whether he could be admitted to the executive committee of the new party, Weber expressed reservations because during World War I Stresemann had become known as an annexationist, i.e., someone who favored increasing Germany's power by annexing land either in Europe or as overseas colonies. Weber did not, however, object to collaboration with Stresemann or to his candidacy for the Weimar National Assembly.

Further negotiations on the merger on 18 and 19 November ultimately failed because the majority of NLP board members were not prepared to lose their political head and most gifted speaker. As a result, on 20 November Stresemann and three other leading NLP members drew up an appeal for the formation of the German People's Party (DVP). It was founded provisionally on 22 November 1918 and permanently on 15 December 1918 by a resolution of the central executive committee of the former NLP. They stressed the importance of members viewing the action not as the foundation of a new party but rather as a reorganization of the old NLP. The executive committee's resolution was approved only narrowly, by a vote of 33 to 28.

Most of the NLP's center and right wing members joined the DVP. Between 22 November and 15 December there were additional attempts to reach an agreement with the new German Democratic Party (DDP), which had been formed out of the FVP'S and the more left-leaning members of the NLP, but these failed. Stresemann remained chairman of the DVP until his death in 1929.

=== Establishment and consolidation ===
In 1919, the DVP initially rejected the Weimar Constitution, and for a time was counted as part of the "national opposition" to the Weimar Coalition. However, it participated in almost all Reich governments from 1920 to 1931. This was primarily due to Stresemann. Although he was at heart a monarchist, he recognized that a return to monarchy could only be achieved through a coup followed by civil war, a path he firmly rejected. At the party congress in Jena on 13 April 1919, he said: "We must not proceed from one bloodbath to another. ... The path to domestic peace can only be on the basis of a republican form of government. That is why we are working for it."

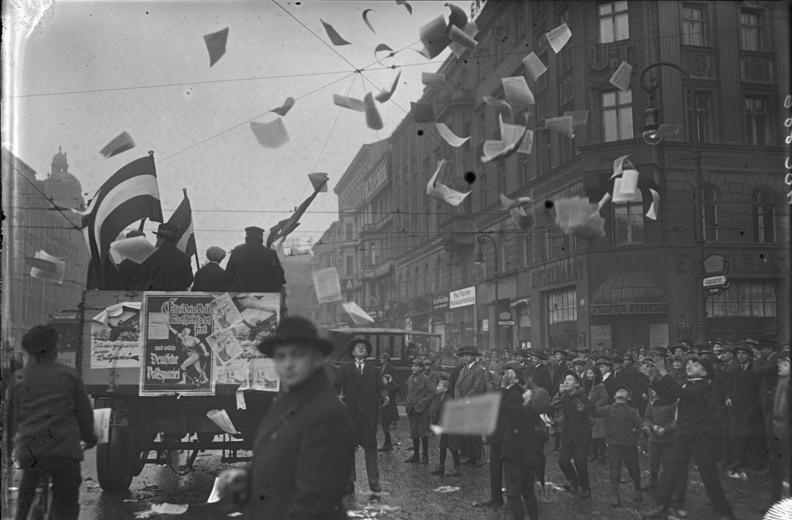
DVP campaign for the Reichstag election of December 1924

Initially, this balancing act – cooperation in forming the new state despite rejection of the Republic – was successful. The party criticized the Treaty of Versailles and the enormous burdens associated with it, as well as the tax policy of Finance Minister Matthias Erzberger of the Catholic Centre Party, which especially affected the middle class. Unlike the nationalist-conservative German National People's Party (DNVP), the DVP was not directed destructively against the Weimar Republic but combined its criticisms with proposals for reform that stayed within the system. During the 1920 Kapp Putsch, however, the party, like its chairman Stresemann, played a role that was less than friendly to the Republic. At first they openly tolerated the Putsch, which attempted to overthrow the Republic and set up an autocratic state in its place, although they opposed the use of violence. Only when the failure of the putsch was obvious did they attempt to mediate between the putschists and the Reich government.

In the 1920 German federal election, the DVP was able to improve its percentage of the vote by almost ten points, to 13.9%. The Weimar coalition made up of the Social Democratic Party (SPD), Centre Party and DDP lost the overwhelming majority it had from the 1919 election, falling from 76% to 44%. At the time of the election, the DVP had about 800,000 members.

In June 1920, the German People's Party for the first time participated in a Reich government, the Fehrenbach cabinet. The SPD, the leading party in founding the Republic, had suffered significant losses in the election and withdrew into opposition even though it was still the strongest force in the Reichstag at 22% (down from 38%). Its previous coalition partners, the Centre Party and the left-liberal DDP, which had also lost a considerable number of votes to right-wing parties, formed a minority government with the DVP. The SPD decided to accept it on the condition that the DVP protect the Republic. There were three DVP members in the new cabinet: Rudolf Heinze as justice minister and vice chancellor, Ernst Scholz as economics minister, and Hans von Raumer as treasury minister. In May 1921 the DVP left the Reich government when the Fehrenbach cabinet fell, but in the Reichstag it supported on a case-by-case basis the government of Centre Party politician Joseph Wirth, under whom the Weimar coalition had been revived. When the "Cabinet of the Economy" was formed under the nonpartisan Wilhelm Cuno in November 1922, the DVP again participated in the government, with Rudolf Heinze as minister of justice and Johann Becker the economics minister.

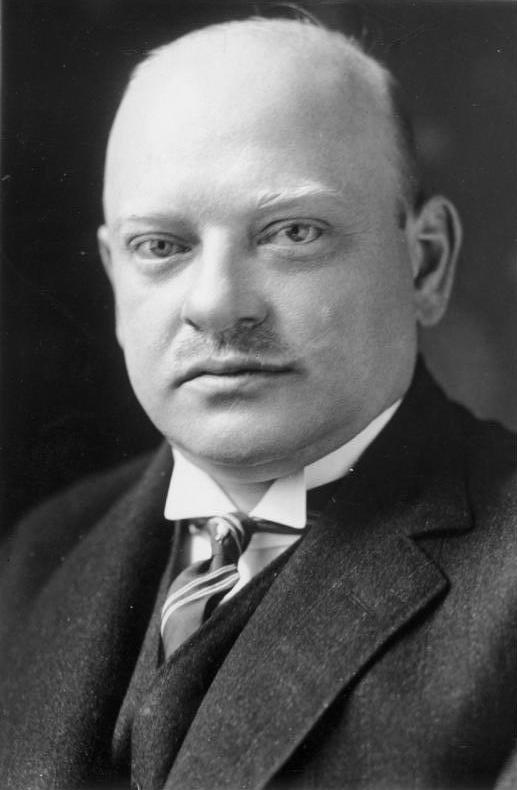
Gustav Stresemann

The minority government – the parties represented in the government held only 172 of the 459 Reichstag seats – was from the outset under strong pressure from the right and the left, especially since the political situation – the occupation of the Ruhr by France and Belgium in January 1923 and the hyperinflation which peaked in November 1923 – made it difficult for it to govern. After Cuno's government broke up under the strain of the Ruhr occupation, Stresemann and the DVP, together with the SPD, Centre Party and DDP, formed their first grand coalition on 13 August 1923. It was the only Reich government led by the German People's Party. This basic constellation of the four parties made up the majority of the governments during the short-lived Republic. Although Stresemann was only able to lead the government for three months, since he also was voted out of office due to the Ruhr crisis, the first steps toward consolidating the Weimar Republic were taken during the short period. In spite of fierce attacks from the opposition DNVP, passive resistance to the Ruhr occupation was abandoned and the inflation of 1914 to 1923 was fought successfully with the introduction of the Rentenmark on 15 November 1923.

Although the DVP was unable to maintain its 1920 results of 13.9% of the total votes, it received between 8.7 and 10.1 percent in the three Reichstag elections between 1924 and 1928. Despite Stresemann's brief time in office, the German People's Party had become fully a part of the Weimar Republic and went on to be one of it mainstays. Stresemann was foreign minister in all subsequent cabinets until his death in October 1929. He made a sustained effort to end Germany's foreign policy isolation and to revise the Treaty of Versailles by peaceful means. His involvement was central to the realization of both the 1924 Dawes Plan, which resolved the issue of German payment of war reparations for the short term, and the Locarno Treaties of 1925 which contributed to Germany's admission to the League of Nations in 1926. Stresemann, along with his French counterpart Aristide Briand, were awarded the Nobel Peace Prize in 1926 for their work on the Locarno Treaties.

While the initial cabinets that the DVP participated in were middle class cabinets in which, in addition to the DVP, the Centre, DDP and Bavarian People's Party, the DNVP was also sometimes represented, the German People's Party also participated in the second cabinet of the Social Democrat Hermann Müller from 1928 to 1930. In foreign policy the DVP was in favor of an understanding with the Western powers and thus of a typically republican foreign policy. After Stresemann's death in October 1929, Julius Curtius, the previous economics minister, succeeded him in the foreign office and took a more demanding stance. Stresemann's approach, which had been directed towards rapprochement, gave way, according to historian Andreas Rödder, to one of negotiation that nevertheless still pursued its goals peacefully.

Governments with DVP Participation
Chancellor	Parties	Start date	End date
Constantin Fehrenbach	Z–DDP–DVP	25 June 1920	4 May 1921
Wilhelm Cuno (Ind)	Ind–DVP–DDP–Z–BVP	22 November 1922	12 August 1923
Gustav Stresemann	DVP–SPD–Z–DDP	13 August 1923	30 November 1923
Wilhelm Marx	Z–DVP–BVP–DDP Z–DVP–DDP	30 November 1923	15 January 1925
Hans Luther (Ind)	Ind–DVP–DNVP–Z–DDP–BVP Ind–DVP–Z–DDP–BVP	15 January 1925	12 May 1926
Wilhelm Marx	Z–DVP–DDP–BVP Z–DNVP–DVP–BVP	17 May 1926	12 June 1928
Hermann Müller	SPD–DVP–DDP–Z–BVP	28 June 1928	27 March 1930
Heinrich Brüning	Z–DDP–DVP–WF–BVP–KVP Z–DSP–BVP–KVP–CLV	30 March 1930	30 May 1932

Z=Centre Party BVP=Bavarian People's Party WF=Economic Party KVP=Conservative People's Party

=== National Liberal Reich Party ===
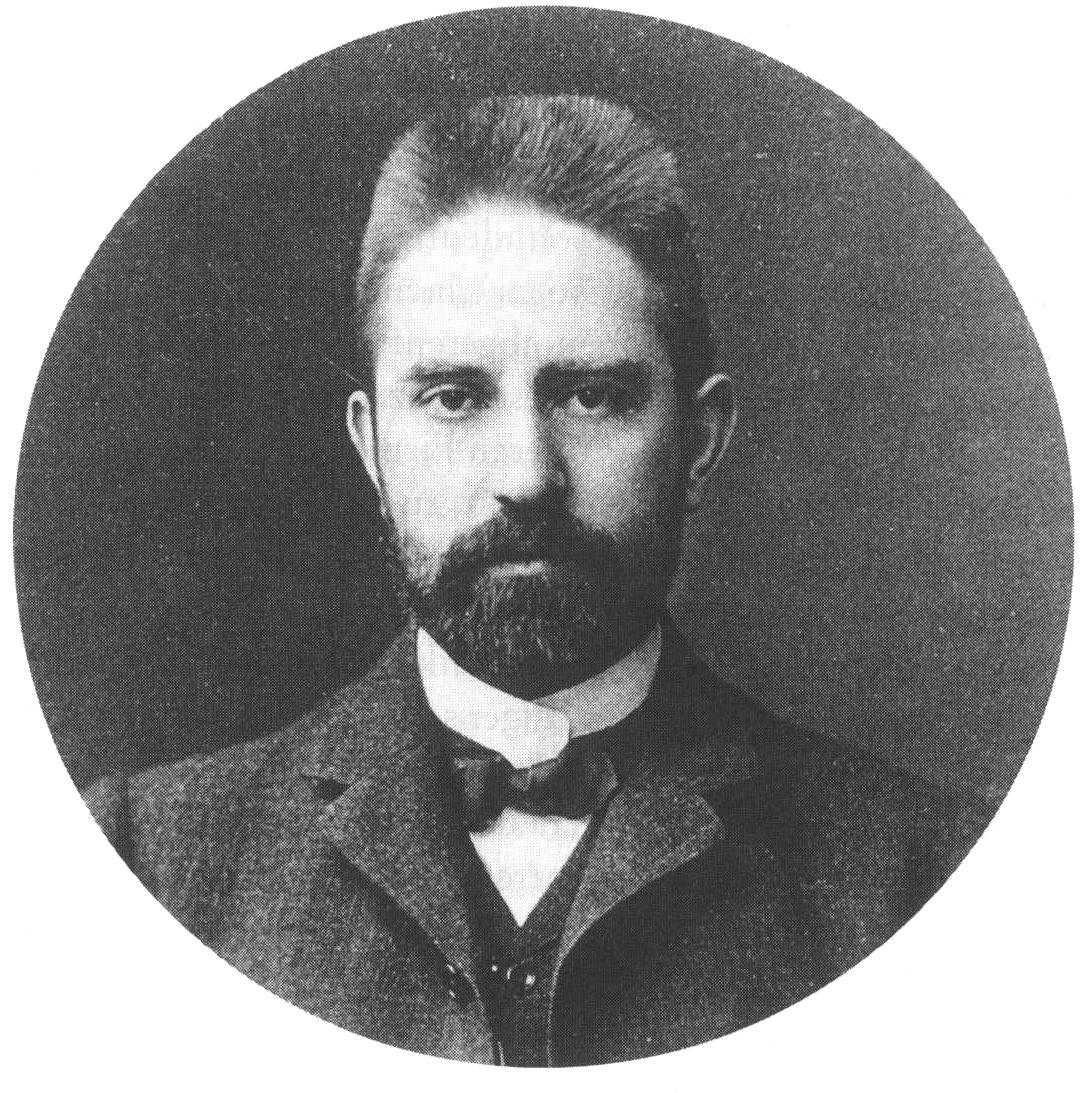
Hugo Stinnes

The DVP's more conservative members never really trusted Stresemann, especially when he became more supportive of the Republic. Even in the early 1920s there was internal opposition to Stresemann, centered especially around the industrial magnate and DVP member Hugo Stinnes. This element sought much closer cooperation with the DNVP but was initially unable to achieve it because of the close ties between the DVP and the Republic. In 1924 former Reich Minister of Economics Johann Becker, together with other representatives of the right wing such as the entrepreneur Albert Vögler, left the DVP and founded the National Liberal Reich Party, which joined the DNVP in 1925.

=== Downturn and end ===
After Stresemann's death in October 1929, Ernst Scholz became party chairman, and the DVP tended more to the right. In Thuringia, for example, it participated in the Baum-Frick government, the first state government with Nazi Party (NSDAP) participation. Although the DVP was represented in Heinrich Brüning's first cabinet, its downturn had begun. The Reichstag election of 14 September 1930 sent the DVP back to the low level of 1919, with just 4.5% of the votes and a loss of 15 seats. The moderate party leader Scholz, who was in poor health, had to resign, making way in November 1930 for Eduard Dingeldey. As a representative of the younger generation, he tried to mediate between the party's wings in order to make a political comeback with a united DVP.

The elections of 1932 showed that the DVP was unable to compete with the DNVP and the NSDAP when it came to the national consciousness they emphasized. It sank to insignificance, with just 1.2% of the vote and 7 seats in the Reichstag. It joined lists with the DNVP for the Reichstag elections in November and gained four seats. But many representatives of the liberal wing left the party, as did a large number of the members of the German National Association of Commercial Employees (Deutschnationaler Handlungsgehilfen-Verband) who had chosen the DVP because of their dislike of Alfred Hugenberg of the DNVP.

In the spring of 1933 Otto Hugo, the deputy chairman of the DVP, demanded that the party be completely merged into the NSDAP, but Dingeldey refused. Only after the National Socialists threatened him with personal consequences, did the National Executive Committee (Reichsvorstand) disband the party on 27 June.

== Ideological foundations and program ==
The party was generally thought to represent the interests of German industrialists. Its platform stressed Christian family values, secular education, lower tariffs, opposition to welfare spending and agrarian subsidies, and hostility towards socialism (Communists and Social Democrats).

The liberal ideology of the people who shaped political thinking in the DVP was fed off impulses from Romanticism and Idealism (see Bildungsbürgertum). Like the National Liberal Party of the German Empire, it saw itself primarily as a liberal rather than a democratic party. This was expressed in the fact that in its politics, the freedom of the individual from state intervention was more important than the enforcement of majority decisions against the interests of individuals. Its concept of man was shaped by the view that the individual who justifies himself through self-acquired education and property knows better what is important for himself – and thus for society as a sum of all its individuals – than do the purely quantitative masses. On the other hand, it called on the intellectual and economic elites to have their actions measured against moral standards and to place themselves at the service of society out of a sense of responsibility to it.

Only from these principles can it be understood why the DVP, which as a supporter of a constitutional monarchy had rejected the Weimar Constitution, sided completely with the Republic after the failure of the Kapp Putsch. Stresemann made this clear in a speech on 25 October 1923, in which, as Chancellor, he explained in the face of hyperinflation and the Ruhr struggle that "I call 'national' the man who, when the cart is in the mud, lends a hand to pull it out, but not the man who stands by and says, 'After all, it won't help, and you are not the right men to do it.'"

== Members and representatives ==
The members and representatives of the DVP, who were primarily committed, principled scholars and civil servants, belonged to the middle and upper classes. They represented the wealthy educated middle class which had come together in the National Liberal Party during the Empire. After 1922 there was a party-affiliated student association, the Reich-Committee of University Groups of the German People's Party (Reichsausschuss der Hochschulgruppen der Deutschen Volkspartei), whose influence in the predominantly right-wing student body remained comparatively small.

== Voter base ==
The DVP had its voter base predominantly in large and mid-sized cities: in the 1920 Reichstag elections, for example, it won an average of 13.2% of the vote in cities with more than 10,000 inhabitants, while it received only 7.2% of the vote in small communities with fewer than 2,000 inhabitants.

The DVP was also a predominantly Protestant party. In areas with a very high proportion of Catholic voters, the DVP's share of the vote always fell far short of its Reich average. In contrast, the lower the proportion of Catholics, the greater the percentage of DVP votes.

The DVP's voter structure thus resembled that of the former National Liberal Party in its distribution by denomination and urban versus rural.

== Election results ==
=== Federal elections (Reichstag) ===
DVP federal election results
Election	Leader	Votes	%	Seats	+/–	Status
1919	Rudolf Heinze	1,345,638	4.43 (6th)	19 / 423		Opposition
1920	Gustav Stresemann	3,919,446	13.90 (4th)	64 / 459	▲46	Z–DDP–DVP (1920–1921)
1920	Gustav Stresemann	3,919,446	13.90 (4th)	64 / 459	▲46	Opposition (1921–1922)
1920	Gustav Stresemann	3,919,446	13.90 (4th)	64 / 459	▲46	Ind.–DVP–DDP–Z–BVP (1922–1923)
1920	Gustav Stresemann	3,919,446	13.90 (4th)	64 / 459	▲46	DVP–SPD–Z–DDP (1923)
1920	Gustav Stresemann	3,919,446	13.90 (4th)	64 / 459	▲46	Z–DVP–BVP–DDP (1923–1924)
May 1924	Gustav Stresemann	2,694,381	9.20 (5th)	45 / 472	▼20	Z–DVP–DDP
Dec 1924	Gustav Stresemann	3,049,064	10.07 (4th)	51 / 493	▲6	Ind.–DVP–DNVP–Z–DDP–BVP (1924–1926)
Dec 1924	Gustav Stresemann	3,049,064	10.07 (4th)	51 / 493	▲6	Ind.–DVP–Z–DDP–BVP (1926–1927)
Dec 1924	Gustav Stresemann	3,049,064	10.07 (4th)	51 / 493	▲6	Ind.–DVP–Z–DDP–BVP (1927–1928)
1928	Gustav Stresemann	2,679,703	8.71 (5th)	45 / 491	▼6	SPD–DVP–DDP–Z–BVP
1930	Ernst Scholz	1,577,365	4.51 (6th)	30 / 577	▼15	Z–DDP–DVP–WP–BVP–KVP
1930	Ernst Scholz	1,577,365	4.51 (6th)	30 / 577	▼15	Opposition
Jul 1932 (Note: While not a part of the non-partisan "Cabinet of Barons" under Chancellor Franz von Papen, the DVP was one of the only parties which did not vote against the government in a motion of no confidence. This became moot as Papen would convince President Paul von Hindenburg to dissolve the Reichstag 3 days after the election and rule via Hindenburg's presidential decrees instead.)	Eduard Dingeldey	436,002	1.18 (7th)	7 / 608	▼10	External support
Nov 1932	Eduard Dingeldey	660,889	1.86 (7th)	11 / 585	▲4	External support
Mar 1933	Eduard Dingeldey	432,312	1.10 (7th)	2 / 647	▼9	External support
Nov 1933	Dissolved. The Nazi Party was the sole legal party.					
1936	Dissolved. The Nazi Party was the sole legal party.					
1938	Dissolved. The Nazi Party was the sole legal party.					

=== Presidential elections ===
Election year	Candidate	1st round			2nd round			Result
Election year	Candidate	Votes	%	Rank	Votes	%	Rank	Result
1919	did not participate							
1925 (Note: Despite holding a plurality in the first round, DVP candidate Karl Jarres, backed by the DVP, DNVP, and Economic Party, did not run in the second round. As such, in the second ballot, the DVP supported Paul von Hindenburg against the Centre Party candidate Wilhelm Marx.)	Karl Jarres	10,416,658	38.77	1st	—N/a			Lost
1932	did not participate							

=== Prussia State elections ===
DVP State election results in the Landtag of Prussia
Election	Votes	%	Seats	+/–
1919	981,665	5.69 (6th)	23 / 401	
1921	2,319,281	14.18 (4th)	58 / 428	▲35
1924	1,797,589	9.78 (4th)	45 / 450	▼13
1928	1,602,070	8.50 (5th)	40 / 450	▼5
1932	330,745	1.50 (6th)	7 / 423	▼33

== Support in the press ==
In contrast to the German Democratic Party, which was openly sponsored by the major liberal papers in Berlin (including the Vossische Zeitung and Berliner Tageblatt), the DVP received support only from the Kölnischen Zeitung (Cologne), the Magdeburg Zeitung, the Tägliche Rundschau from Berlin, and the Königsberger Allgemeine Zeitung. The other major parties of the Weimar Republic were also better positioned in terms of the media. The SPD had its own newspapers, the ideas of the Centre Party were promoted by the Catholic papers and the DNVP had Hugenberg's opinion empire behind it.

== Finances ==
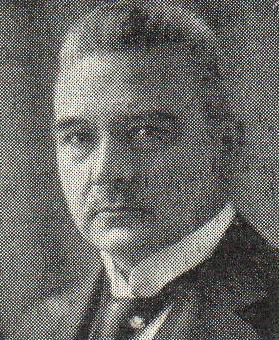
Albert Vögler

Even though the DVP was considered the party of big industrial capital, it always struggled with financial problems. The DDP was able to rely primarily on Berlin and Hamburg businesses, especially in the early days of the Weimar Republic, while the DNVP was mainly supported by Rhenish-Westphalian heavy industry. Hugo Stinnes and Albert Vögler were the only two business barons who were on the side of the German People's Party. Stinnes' death and Vögler's resignation from the party, both in 1924, considerably reduced the DVP's base of donations. Smaller amounts were contributed by the Kali-Society and the companies of the Hansabund, an anti-monopolistic economic-political interest group led by DVP politician Rießer.

== Notable members ==
- Johann Becker (1869–1951), Reich Economic Minister
- Heinrich Beythien
- Reinhold Quaatz
- Wilhelm Bünger (1870–1937), Saxon Minister President and judge in the Reichstag Fire Trial
- Julius Curtius (1877–1948), Reich Foreign Minister and Economics Minister
- Rudolf Heinze (1865–1928), Reich Minister of Justice
- Gerhard Graf von Kanitz (1885–1949), Reich Economic Minister
- Siegfried von Kardorff
- Katharina von Kardorff-Oheimb (1879–1962), Reichstag deputy
- Clara Mende (1869–1947), Reichstag deputy
- Paul Moldenhauer
- Hans von Raumer (1870–1965), Reich Economic Minister
- Werner von Rheinbaben
- Karl Sack (1896–1945), Resistance fighter against National Socialism
- Heinrich Schnee
- Emil Georg von Stauß (1877–1942), Banker
- Hugo Stinnes (1870–1924), Industrialist
- Albert Vögler (1877–1945), Industrialist
- Arthur Zarden (1885–1944), State Secretary

== Involvement in founding parties in 1945 ==
Politicians from the DVP participated in the founding of the German Party (DP), Free Democratic Party (FDP) and Christian Democratic Union (CDU) after World War II.

== See also ==
- Contributions to liberal theory
- Elections in the Free State of Prussia
- Liberal democracy
- Liberalism
- Liberalism in Germany
- Liberalism worldwide
- List of liberal parties
- List of German People's Party politicians

Preceded by National Liberal Party (Germany)	German liberal parties 1918–1933	Succeeded by Liberal Democratic Party of Germany
Preceded by National Liberal Party (Germany)	German liberal parties 1918–1933	Succeeded by Free Democratic Party of Germany
