= Wilhelm Cuno =

Chancellor of Germany from 1922 to 1923

Wilhelm Cuno TOSD
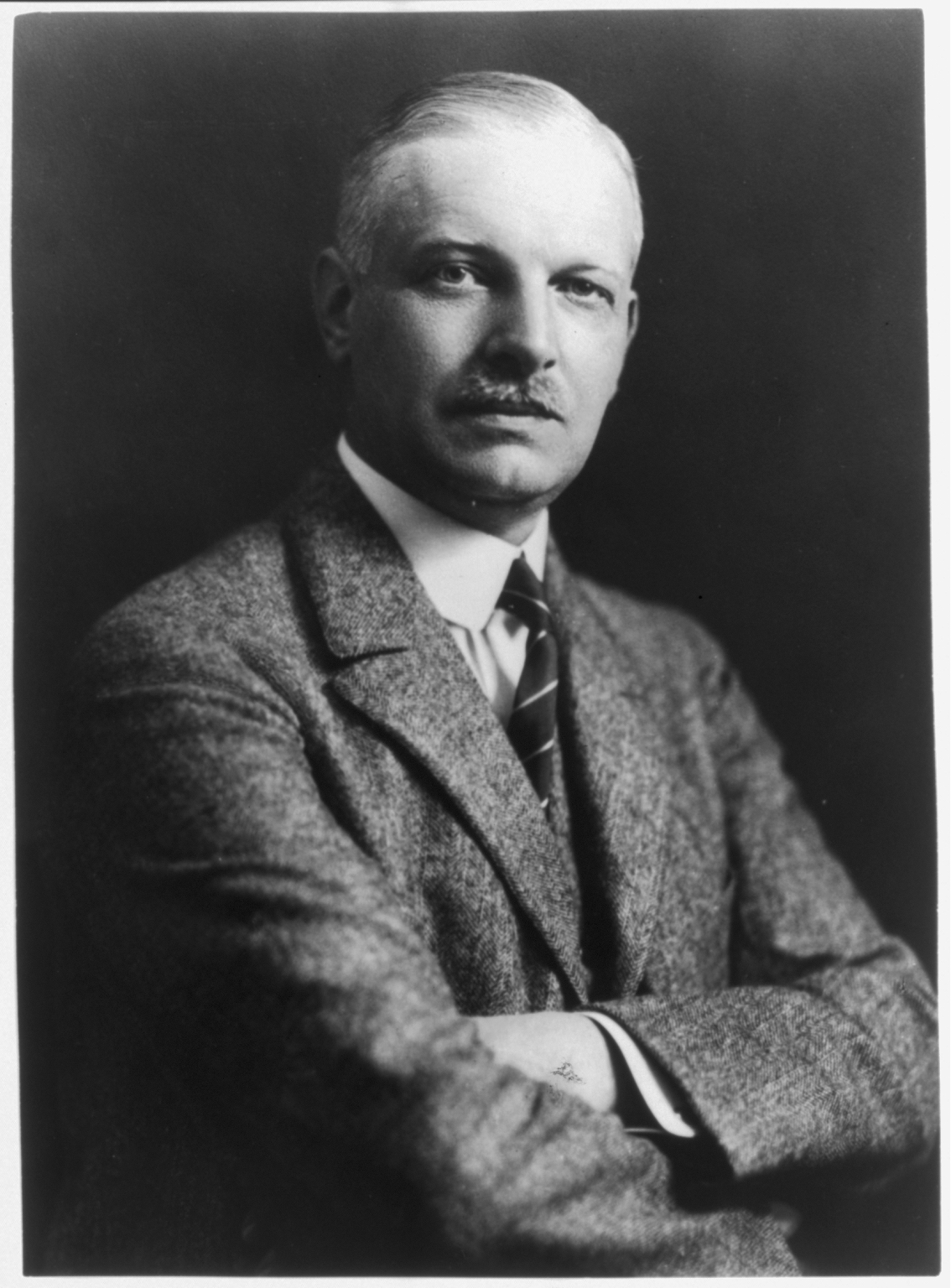

Chancellor of Germany (Weimar Republic)
- In office 22 November 1922 – 12 August 1923
- President: Friedrich Ebert
- Preceded by: Joseph Wirth
- Succeeded by: Gustav Stresemann

Personal details
- Born: Wilhelm Carl Josef Cuno; 2 July 1876 Suhl, German Empire
- Died: 3 January 1933 (aged 56) Aumühle, Weimar Republic
- Party: None
- Spouse: Martha Berta Wirtz
- Children: 5

Wilhelm Carl Josef Cuno (2 July 1876 – 3 January 1933) was a German businessman and politician who was the chancellor of Germany from 1922 to 1923 for a total of 264 days. His tenure included the beginning of the occupation of the Ruhr by French and Belgian troops and the period in which inflation in Germany accelerated towards hyperinflation.

After beginning his career in the civil service, Cuno helped organize Germany's food supply during the early years of World War I before he went to work for the Hamburg America shipping company in 1917. Because of his economic expertise, he was involved in a number of important post-war negotiations with the victorious Allies. When he was appointed chancellor of Germany in November 1922, he formed a "business ministry" made up primarily of men who were, like himself, political independents. His plans to handle the war reparations issue and stabilise the currency were derailed by the French and Belgian occupation of the Ruhr in January 1923. Cuno instituted a policy of passive resistance and provided financial assistance to the workers and firms affected by it. The payments, made possible primarily by printing money, began the runup to the German hyperinflation of 1923.

After his government resigned in August 1923, Cuno returned to the Hamburg America Line.

== Early life ==
Wilhelm Cuno was born on 2 July 1876 in Suhl, in what was then Prussian Saxony and is now in Thuringia. He was the son of the administrative civil servant August George Wilhelm Cuno (1848–1915) and his wife Catherina Elisabeth Theresia, née Daske (1852–1878). He studied law in Berlin and Heidelberg and was awarded a Juris Doctor. He was a member of K.D.St.V. Arminia Heidelberg, a Catholic student fraternity that is a member of the Union of Catholic German Student Fraternities.

In 1906, Cuno, a Roman Catholic, married Martha Berta Wirtz (born 1879), daughter of Hamburg merchant Hugo Wirtz. They had three sons and two daughters.

== Early career ==
Cuno was employed by the federal Treasury Department in 1907, initially as Regierungsassessor, (Note: A Regierungsassessor ("Government Assessor") was commonly a younger senior civil servant, usually not yet employed on a permanent basis, who had successfully passed the major state examinations.) was promoted in 1910 to Regierungsrat (Note: A Regierungsrat ("Government Councillor") was a civil servant at entry level in the higher civil service category of the federal or state administration.) and then in 1912 to Geheimer Regierungsrat. (Note: A Geheimer Regierungsrat ("Privy Government Councillor") was a step above a Regierungsrat.) His tasks mainly involved preparing parliamentary bills and presenting them to the Reichstag.

During World War I, Cuno was involved in organizing food supplies for all of Germany, first directing the Imperial Grain Agency from its inception in early 1915 until July 1916. It was responsible for the collection and distribution of grain and flour throughout Germany. He was then attached to the State Secretary (i.e., Minister) Adolf Tortilowicz von Batocki-Friebe to help organize the War Office of Food (Kriegsernährungsamt). In late 1916, Cuno was put in charge of the department of war-related economic issues at the Treasury Department.

At the request of Albert Ballin, general director of the Hamburg America Line (HAPAG), Cuno quit the civil service to join the shipping company as a director in November 1917. After Ballin committed suicide in November 1918 in despair over Germany's defeat in World War I, Cuno was promoted to HAPAG's general director in December.

As an economic expert, Cuno participated in the post-war negotiations on the armistice, reparations and peace terms, and in other international conferences, including the Genoa Economic and Financial Conference. He left it in protest after Germany signed the Treaty of Rapallo, which normalised relations with the Soviet Union. In 1921 and 1922, Cuno was an important negotiator in talks between German shipping firms and the government regarding compensation for the merchant ships delivered to the Allies under the terms of the Treaty of Versailles.

In 1920, Cuno led HAPAG into an alliance with United American Lines, helping to re-establish HAPAG as a passenger line. He also unofficially represented Germany's foreign policy interests during his travels abroad.

== Chancellor ==
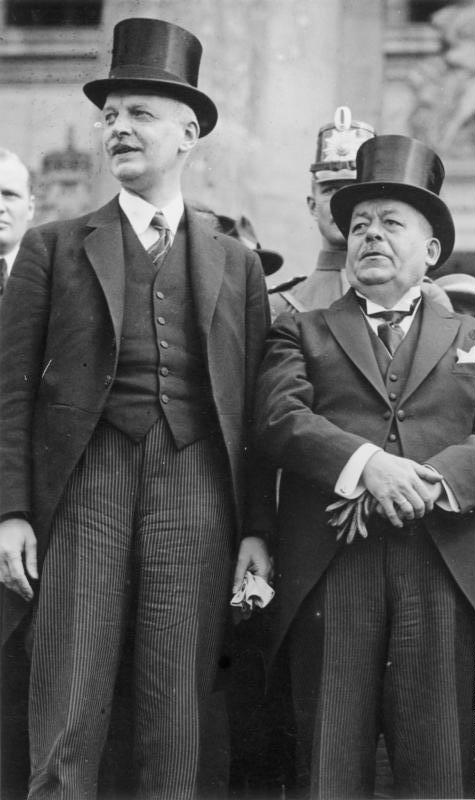
Cuno, left, with German President Friedrich Ebert (1923)

Cuno rejected several proposals to assume the post of foreign minister in the autumn of 1922 and minister of finance after Matthias Erzberger's resignation in 1920, but he agreed to form a cabinet after the resignation of Joseph Wirth's second cabinet. Cuno was appointed chancellor on 22 November 1922 by presidential decree and without a vote in the Reichstag. He was the first chancellor in the Weimar Republic who was not a member of a party. Politically, he was quite far from the president, Social Democrat Friedrich Ebert, who selected him as chancellor. Cuno had a somewhat aloof position towards the Republic and its parliamentary system. He held the Reichstag in fairly low esteem and felt the bickering between the parties to be distasteful. Cuno formed a government composed of six non-party economists plus two members each of the German People's Party, German Democratic Party and Centre Party, and one from the Bavarian People's Party. The government was referred to alternatively as a "business ministry", an "economic government" or "cabinet of personalities", emphasizing that it was not the result of a coalition between the parliamentary parties. His government generally advocated policies of economic liberalism.

Hopes were high that a government of experts, led by a man with excellent connections abroad, would make headway in the difficult talks with the Allies. They were, however, disappointed. Cuno's plan to settle the reparations issue and to stabilise the German mark in the foreign exchange market was rejected by the Allies at the urging of French Prime Minister and Foreign Minister Raymond Poincaré. When Germany defaulted on its shipments of wood and coal (made as reparations in place of the gold currency that it lacked), the French declared it to be a deliberate breach of the agreements and on 11 January 1923 ordered its troops (later joined by Belgians) to occupy the Ruhr. The move, widely seen as illegal even outside Germany, caused the outraged Cuno government to call for passive resistance. Reparation shipments to France and Belgium were stopped, the mines were told not to make any more deliveries to the countries, and civil servants and railroad personnel were instructed to disobey orders by the occupation authorities.

The Ruhr economy, the industrial heartland of Germany, came almost to a complete stop. Financial support payments by the German government to the Ruhr businesses and to the inhabitants of the occupied zone affected by firm closures, deportations and arrests quickly added up to vast sums, mostly financed by printing money. This caused inflation to increase rapidly and the mark to go into free fall.

Attempts by the government to resume talks about reparations in May and June 1923 failed as Poincaré refused to negotiate unless passive resistance was ended first. A wave of strikes against the government began in August 1923. On 12 August 1923, Cuno and his cabinet resigned in the face of a vote of no-confidence initiated by the Social Democratic Party (SPD).

In social policy, Cuno's time as chancellor witnessed the passage in June 1923 of a law that established an insurance system for laborers and employees (as noted by one study) "that are engaged exclusively or principally in mining or allied industries".

== Later life ==
Cuno retired from politics and returned to serve as a director at HAPAG. In 1926, he once again became its director general. He was involved in negotiations about the release of German property impounded in the U.S. during the war and in working towards the merger with the Norddeutsche Lloyd shipping company, which took place in 1930.

During the 1925 German presidential election, Cuno was outspoken in his support for Paul von Hindenburg, rather than the candidate of the Centre Party, Wilhelm Marx.

In 1932, Cuno joined the industrialist Wilhelm Keppler to advise Adolf Hitler economically.

Cuno died suddenly on 3 January 1933 at Aumühle near Hamburg.

== Notes ==
Political offices
Preceded by Joseph Wirth	Chancellor of Germany; 1922 – 1923	Succeeded by Gustav Stresemann
