= Bauer cabinet =

1919–1920 cabinet of Weimar Germany

Cabinet of Gustav Bauer
- 2nd Cabinet of Weimar Germany
- 21 June 1919 – 27 March 1920
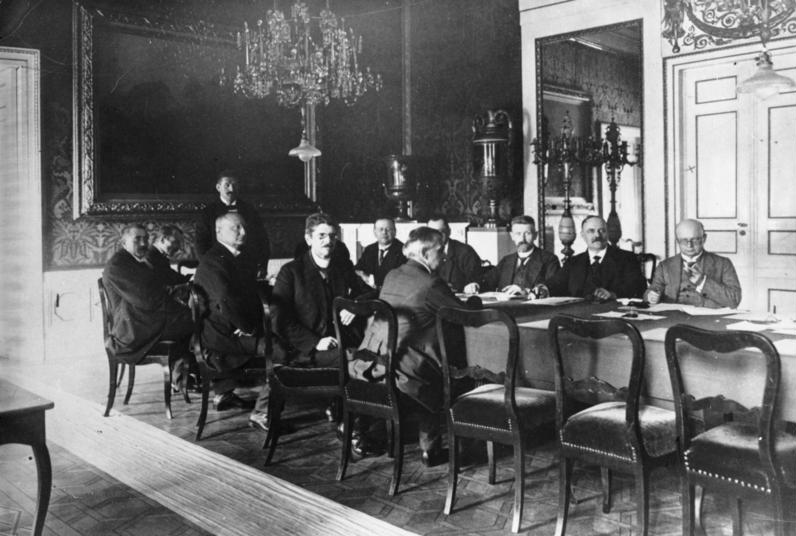
- Meeting of the cabinet in 1919
- Date formed: 21 June 1919
- Date dissolved: 27 March 1920 (9 months and 6 days)

People and organisations
- President: Friedrich Ebert
- Chancellor: Gustav Bauer
- Vice-Chancellor: Matthias Erzberger (until 2 October 1919); Eugen Schiffer (from 2 October 1919)
- Member parties: Social Democratic Party; Centre Party; German Democratic Party
- Status in legislature: Weimar Coalition
- Opposition parties: German National People's Party; Independent Social Democratic Party; German People's Party

History
- Election: 1919 federal election
- Legislature term: Weimar National Assembly
- Predecessor: Scheidemann cabinet
- Successor: First Müller cabinet

The Bauer cabinet, headed by Gustav Bauer of the Social Democratic Party of Germany (SPD), was the second democratically elected government during the Weimar Republic. Bauer's title was minister president until the Weimar Constitution came into force on 14 August 1919, after which he became chancellor of Germany. The cabinet took office on 21 June 1919 when it replaced the Scheidemann cabinet, which had resigned the day before in protest against the terms of the Treaty of Versailles. Although the Weimar Constitution was not in force at the time, the Bauer cabinet is generally counted as the second government of the Weimar Republic.

The cabinet was initially based on a coalition of the Social Democratic Party and the Centre Party. The German Democratic Party (DDP), which had been part of Scheidemann's cabinet, had refused to support signing the Treaty of Versailles and did not join the Bauer cabinet until 3 October 1919, at which point the original Weimar Coalition of centre-left parties was restored.

During its time in office, the Bauer cabinet worked with the Weimar National Assembly (the interim legislative body of the Republic) to ratify the Treaty of Versailles, adopt the Weimar Constitution and begin a fundamental reform of the German tax system. It also passed a number of social welfare laws covering unemployment relief and health insurance.

The Bauer cabinet resigned on 27 March 1920 as a result of its unsatisfactory handling of the Kapp-Lüttwitz Putsch. It was followed by the government of Hermann Müller of the SPD.

== Election and establishment ==
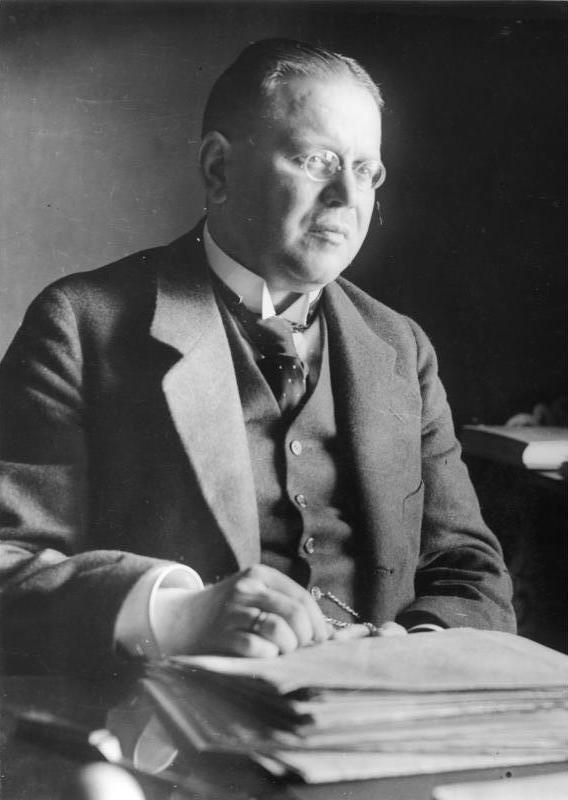
Matthias Erzberger, Vice-Chancellor and Minister of Finance

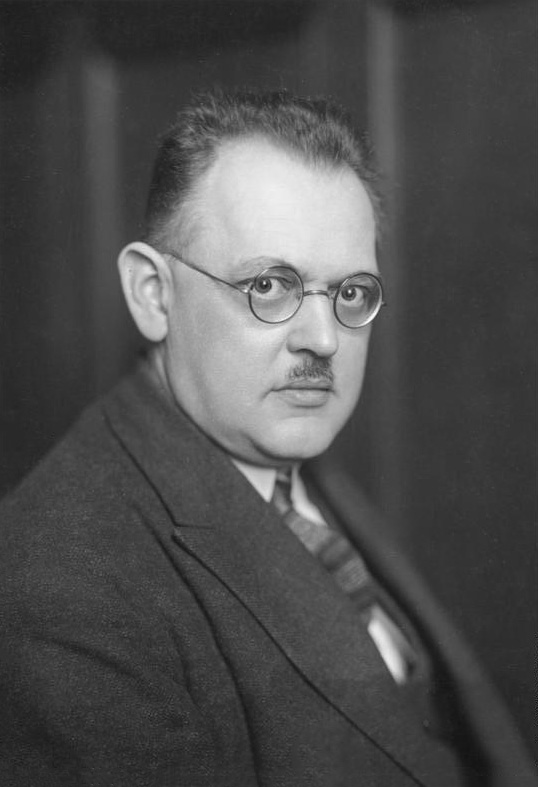
Hermann Müller, Minister of Foreign Affairs

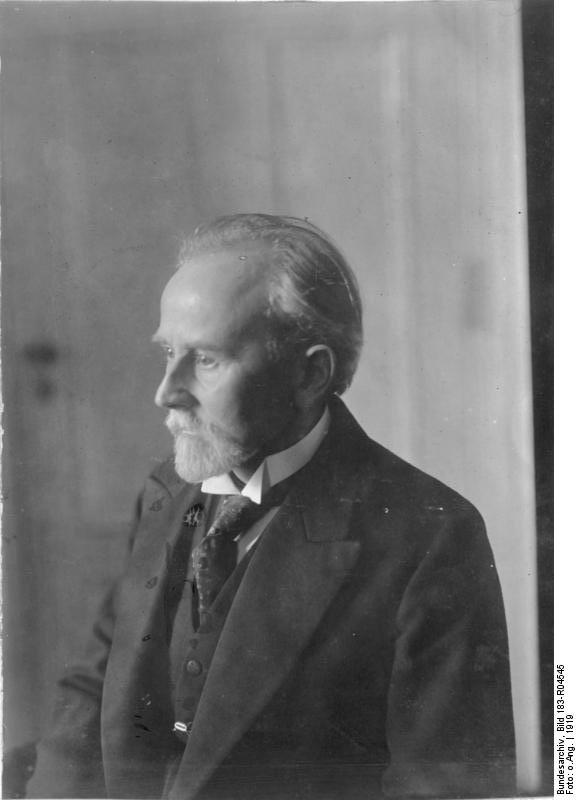
Dr Eduard David (SPD), Minister of the Interior, then Minister without portfolio

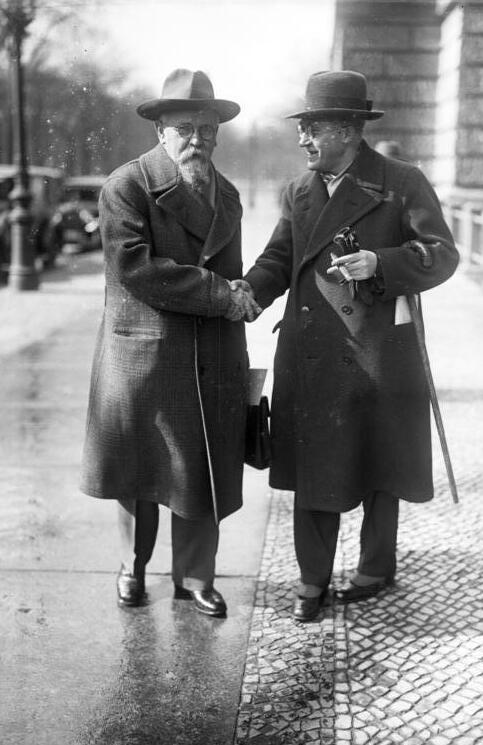
Rudolf Wissell (left, SPD), Minister of Economic Affairs

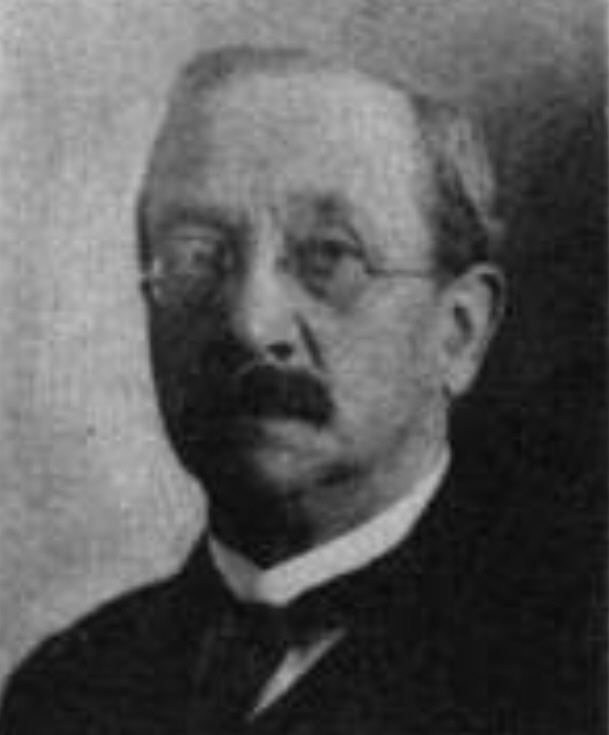
Robert Schmidt (SPD), Minister of Economic Affairs and of Food and Agriculture

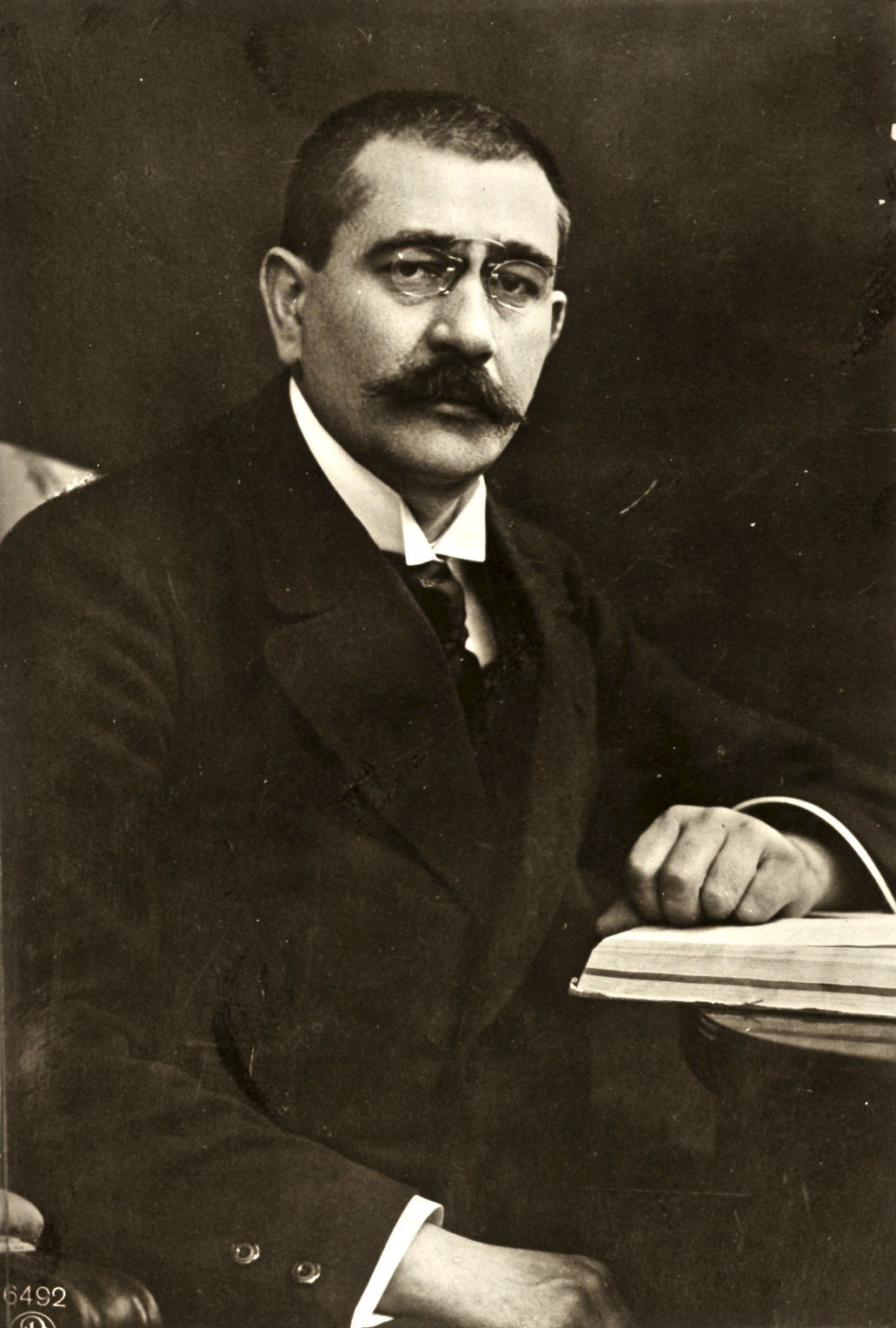
Gustav Noske (SPD), Reichswehr Minister

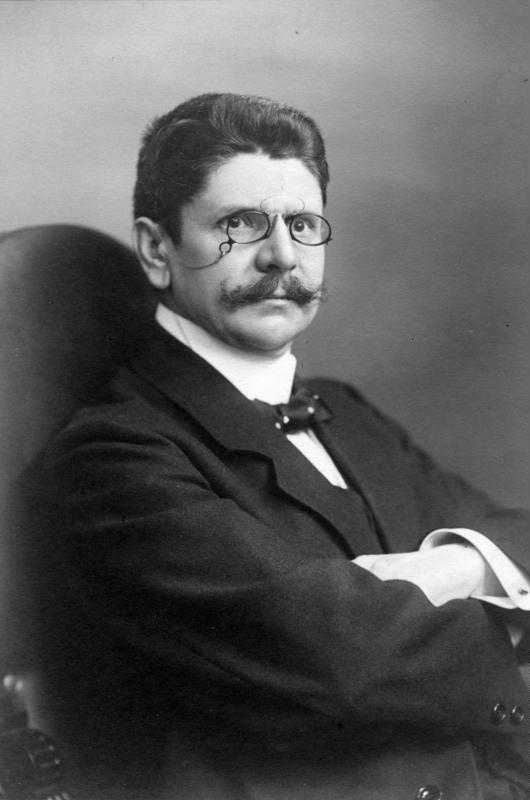
Johannes Bell (Centre), Minister of Transport and of Colonial Minister

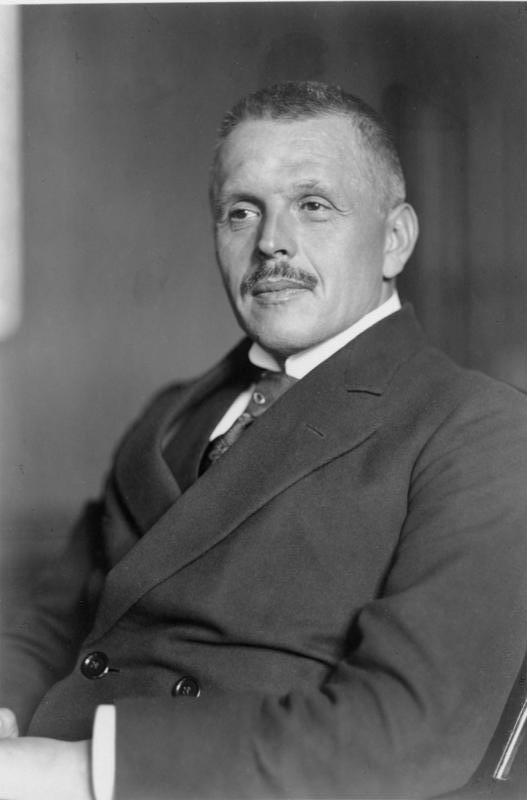
Otto Gessler (DDP), Minister for Reconstruction

The government of Gustav Bauer was created under great time pressure and extraordinary circumstances. Early on 20 June 1919, the government of Philipp Scheidemann resigned when it was unable to agree on a common stance towards the Allied ultimatum to either sign the Treaty of Versailles or face a resumption of hostilities. Germany had less than five days to accept. It was widely feared that a refusal to sign would result in the dismemberment of the German state, occupation by foreign troops and a possible plunge into civil war.

At a loss over how to proceed, the Scheidemann cabinet had seriously considered handing over supreme authority over Germany to the Allies. It had been unprepared for their complete refusal to negotiate the Treaty's terms. After the cabinet's resignation, it fell to President Friedrich Ebert and the majority parties of the Weimar National Assembly to create a new government and to decide whether to sign the Treaty. Out of this crisis emerged the Bauer cabinet.

The parties themselves were split, with ongoing internal debates between those for and against signing. Under the leadership of Matthias Erzberger, the Centre Party was willing to sign provided that some "dishonourable" clauses were struck from the text, and the Social Democrats advocated a separate, parallel note of protest. However, the DDP, which had been most vocal among the coalition parties in opposing the Treaty, insisted on making substantial changes as the condition for its acceptance. It was seen as a tactical move, an attempt to preserve the appearance of a willingness to compromise whilst remaining true to their principles.

Threats by Ebert to resign and even the readiness of SPD and Centre Party to accept the DDP's demands failed to bring the Democrats on board. On the morning of 21 June, the DDP forbade its members from taking positions in a new cabinet. This made it impossible for those in the DDP who were in favour of signing (such as Hugo Preuss and Bernhard Dernburg) to cooperate and also posed a problem for the Centre Party, which previously had refused to entertain the idea of a coalition without the DDP. Ebert, who had promised never to call for a cabinet based only on the SPD and Centre Party, had to give in. The Social Democrats in the Assembly named Eduard David, who, next to Erzberger, had been the member of the old cabinet most supportive of the Treaty, as candidate for head of government. Hermann Müller, the SPD chairman, was seen as a favourite by the public.

On the morning of 21 June, Müller presented the SPD parliamentary group with an almost complete cabinet list (virtually identical with the cabinet eventually appointed). David had declined to become head of government for "health reasons". According to Müller, Gustav Noske, Rudolf Wissell and Robert Schmidt, all SPD, were needed in their respective posts as ministers. Former Minister of Labour Gustav Bauer was then named as the candidate for minister president, even though he had been quite vocal in his opposition to the Treaty. The Social Democrats were surprised by the choice. They asked Müller to become head of government, but he refused. Overall, the formation of the cabinet occurred with minimal involvement by the SPD, for which Müller had to justify himself shortly before the initial meeting of the cabinet.

President Ebert apparently had exercised a considerable amount of influence on events (to which he was entitled under §8 of the temporary constitution, the Law on Provisional Reich Power). Since Bauer was a friend of Ebert, the President likely did not intend for him to "take a fall" as the head of government who had to sign the hated Treaty. Bauer was not a great leadership personality who could be confidently expected to deal successfully with the huge challenges posed by complying with the Treaty while fending off internal dissent both from the left and the right. Ebert's choice is seen today as a reflection of the fact that Ebert himself had only grudgingly accepted the inevitability of signing the Treaty shortly before the Scheidemann cabinet resigned. In contrast to those like David who had argued in favour of signing from the start, Bauer was – like Ebert – a reluctant convert. The choice of Bauer thus was based on a mutual feeling of party solidarity between two Social Democrats willing to take responsibility for the consequences of the lost war and on Bauer's personal friendship with Ebert.

Bauer took on the thankless task, saying, "We are not standing here out of the interest of our parties, and even less – believe me – out of ambition. We are standing here out of a feeling of responsibility, in the awareness that it is our damned duty to save what can be saved". On 22 June, he spoke defiantly to the National Assembly about the need to sign the Versailles Treaty:

Let us sign; that is the proposal I have to make to you on behalf of the entire cabinet. The reasons that compel us to make the proposal are the same as yesterday, only now we are separated by a period of barely four hours before the resumption of hostilities. We could not justify a new war even if we had weapons. We are defenceless, but without defence does not mean without honour. Certainly, our enemies want to take away our honour, there is no doubt about that, but that this attempt at stripping away our honour will one day fall back on the originators, that it is not our honour that will perish in this world tragedy, that is my belief until my last breath.

A final attempt to have the so-called "articles of shame" 227 to 231 removed from the Treaty was rejected by the Allies. From the moment of its inception, the Bauer cabinet was thus tainted in the eyes of many in Germany, both for its submissive acceptance and its failure to negotiate an improvement in the Treaty.

At that point, there were rumours of an impending military coup, and the Centre Party started to reconsider its support for signing. Ministers Johannes Bell and Wilhelm Mayer argued for a rejection of the Treaty. It was only the clear message sent by General Wilhelm Groener at the Supreme Army Command (OHL) that a resumption of hostilities would be "hopeless" that prevented the speedy collapse of the Bauer cabinet.

== Members ==
The members of the cabinet – known collectively as the Reich Ministry until the Weimar Constitution came into force in August 1919, when the official name became the Reich government – were as follows:

Portfolio	Minister	Took office	Left office	Party
Chancellorship	Gustav Bauer	21 June 1919	27 March 1920	SPD
Vice-Chancellorship	Matthias Erzberger	21 June 1919	3 October 1919	Centre
Vice-Chancellorship	Eugen Schiffer	3 October 1919	27 March 1920	DDP
Foreign Affairs	Hermann Müller	21 June 1919	27 March 1920	SPD
Interior	Eduard David	21 June 1919	4 October 1919	SPD
Interior	Erich Koch-Weser	5 October 1919	27 March 1920	DDP
Justice	Vacant	21 June 1919	1 October 1919	
Justice	Eugen Schiffer	2 October 1919	27 March 1920	DDP
Labour	Alexander Schlicke	21 June 1919	27 March 1920	SPD
Reichswehr	Gustav Noske	21 June 1919	23 March 1920	SPD
Reichswehr	Otto Gessler	24 March 1920	27 March 1920	DDP
Economic Affairs	Rudolf Wissell	21 June 1919	14 July 1919	SPD
Economic Affairs	Robert Schmidt	15 July 1919	27 March 1920	SPD
Finance	Matthias Erzberger	21 June 1919	12 March 1920	Centre
Finance	Vacant	13 March 1920	27 March 1920	
Treasury	Wilhelm Mayer	21 June 1919	18 January 1920	Centre
Treasury	Vacant	19 January 1920	27 March 1920	
Food and Agriculture (Note: On 15 September 1919, the Ministry of Food and Agriculture was merged with the Ministry of Economic Affairs.)	Robert Schmidt	21 June 1919	14 September 1919	SPD
Transport (Note: The Ministry of Transport was newly created in 1919. Bell became its first minister on 5 November 1919.)	Johannes Bell	5 November 1919	27 March 1920	Centre
Postal Affairs	Johannes Giesberts	21 June 1919	27 March 1920	Centre
Colonial Affairs (Note: The affairs of the Colonial Ministry were transferred on 7 November 1919 to the Ministry for Reconstruction, newly created on 25 October 1919.)	Johannes Bell (acting)	21 June 1919	7 November 1919	Centre
Reconstruction	Otto Gessler	25 October 1919	24 March 1920	DDP
Without portfolio	Eduard David	5 October 1919	24 March 1920	SPD
Prussian Ministry of War (non-voting)	Walther Reinhardt (Note: Reinhardt, Prussian Minister of War until the institution's dissolution in September 1919, became head of the Supreme Army Command on 1 October, retaining his (non-voting) seat in the cabinet.)	21 June 1919	13 September 1919	Independent
Admiralty (non-voting)	Adolf von Trotha	21 June 1919	13 September 1919	Independent

== Actions ==
After the National Assembly's June vote to accept the Treaty of Versailles by a vote of 237 to 138 with 5 abstentions, it formally ratified the Treaty and the regulations covering the occupation of the Rhineland on 9 July.

The Assembly continued to work on the new constitution for the Republic during the first few months of the Bauer cabinet. It passed the final draft on 31 July, 262 to 75, with the Independent Social Democratic Party (USPD), German National People's Party (DNVP) and German People's Party (DVP) voting against. The Assembly had its first session in Berlin on 30 September, once the capital was considered to be safe.

On 7 July, Finance Minister Matthias Erzberger (Centre Party) presented a package of far-reaching fiscal reforms that fundamentally changed Germany's tax system. Tax legislation and administration were taken from the states and centralised at the Reich level. Income, corporate, inheritance and indirect taxes were standardised and increased, and a one-time property levy was imposed.

Various improvements to unemployment relief (a form of welfare not to be confused with unemployment insurance, which was not introduced in Germany until 1927) were also carried out during Bauer's time as chancellor. A winter supplement was provided in October 1919, and the maximum benefit for single males over the age of 21 was increased from three and a half to six marks in February 1920. In order to reduce government expenditures, a decree of October 1919 ordered all unemployment relief funds that went beyond the maximum scales to be withdrawn from the responsible municipal authorities.

In the field of health insurance, a decree of 28 June 1919 bestowed on rural funds the same right of self-government that other insurance funds had. An order of 27 October 1919 empowered the minister of labour to use grants and loans to encourage "measures likely to create opportunities for employment". In December 1919, laws were passed that extended compulsory insurance against infirmity and old age to certain new classes of workpeople. The Factory Council Act of February 1920 established works councils at workplaces with 20 or more employees as a means of improving lines of communication between labour and management.

In October 1919, a law came into force that entitled insured women to a lump sum of 50 marks from their insurance board to cover the cost of childbirth, together with confinement compensation for 10 weeks. In addition, maternity care was covered by a 25 mark payment and a daily breastfeeding bonus of one mark fifty for 10 weeks. The law entitled the wives and daughters of insured employees (both female and male) to certain types of support in connection with pregnancy. Following a similar decree issued in December 1918, an important law was issued in support of youth welfare in November 1919.

The Reich Settlement Law of August 1919 redistributed large estates among smaller farmers, although by 1928 only 3% of small-scale farmers had benefitted from the law. The Allotment Garden and Small-Lease-Holding Ordinance of July 1919 provided legal protection for non-commercially used property such as workers' gardens and "Schreber" gardens (a rented plot of land used for growing fruits and vegetables).

== Kapp-Lüttwitz Putsch and resignation ==
After the failure of the Kapp-Lüttwitz Putsch on 17 March 1920, union and left-wing leaders such as Carl Legien, Arthur Crispien and Rudolf Hilferding put pressure on the government that had just returned to Berlin after having fled first to Dresden and then to Stuttgart. On 22 March, the unions ended their general strike, which had been central to defeating the putsch, conditional on concessions by the government: withdrawal of troops from Berlin and a decisive influence of organised labour on the makeup of the next cabinet. Ultimately, the Bauer cabinet had to resign because it had been unable to prevent the Kapp-Lüttwitz Putsch. It was to be replaced by a cabinet of politicians who could not be charged with leading Germany to the brink of class and civil war, precisely where it had been a year earlier. The new government was the SPD-led first Müller cabinet, which took office on 27 March 1920.
