= Secretary for the Colonies =

Secretary for the Colonies may refer to:

- Secretary of State for the Colonies (United Kingdom)
  - Secretary of State for War and the Colonies (United Kingdom cabinet position, 1801–1854)
- Secretary for the Colonies of Imperial Germany
