= Colonial Office (disambiguation) =

Colonial Office was a former UK government ministry.

Colonial Office, a government agency which serves to oversee and supervise colonies, may also refer to:

- Office of Insular Affairs, the American government agency
- Imperial Colonial Office (German: Reichskolonialamt), the German Colonial Office
