= Eugen Schiffer =

German lawyer and politician (1860–1954)

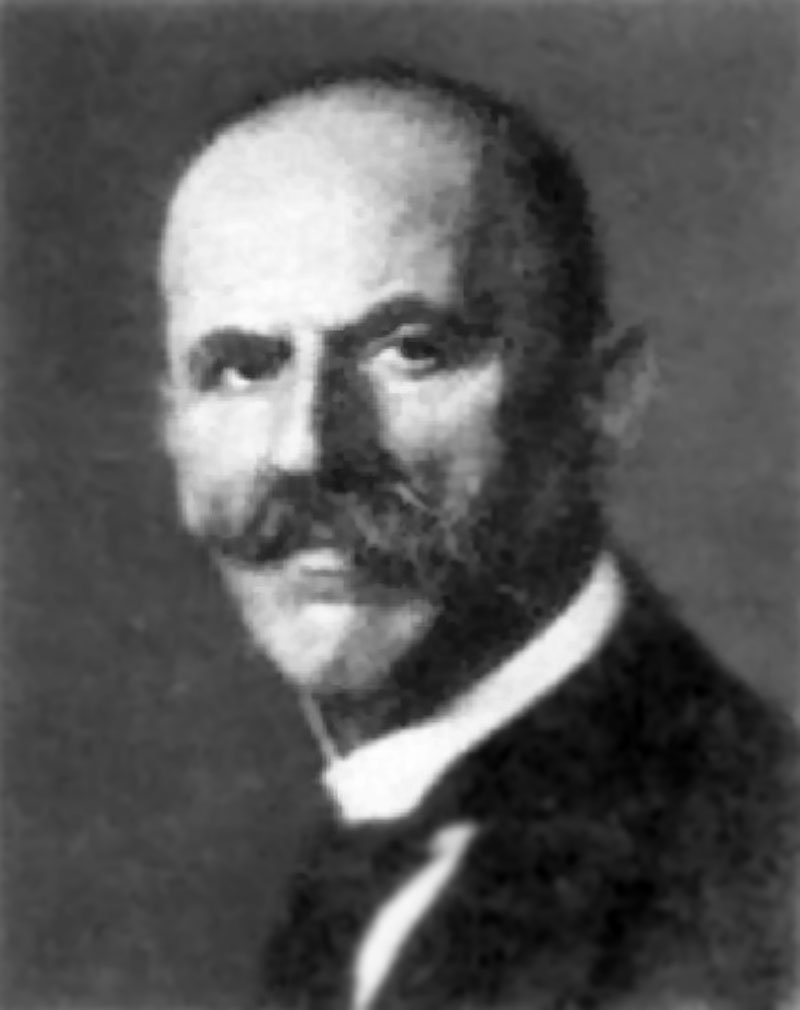

Vice-Chancellor of Germany
- In office 3 October 1919 – 27 March 1920
- Chancellor: Gustav Bauer
- Preceded by: Bernhard Dernburg
- Succeeded by: Erich Koch-Weser

Deputy Minister President of Germany
- In office 13 February 1919 – 19 April 1919
- Minister President: Philipp Scheidemann
- Preceded by: Matthias Erzberger
- Succeeded by: Bernhard Dernburg

Minister of Justice
- In office 10 May 1921 – 22 October 1921
- Chancellor: Hermann Müller; Constantin Fehrenbach; Joseph Wirth
- Preceded by: Rudolf Heinze
- Succeeded by: Gustav Radbruch
- In office 3 October 1919 – 26 March 1920
- Chancellor: Gustav Bauer
- Preceded by: Otto Landsberg
- Succeeded by: Andreas Blunck

Minister of Finance
- In office 13 February 1919 – 19 April 1919
- Minister President: Philipp Scheidemann
- Preceded by: Siegfried von Roedern
- Succeeded by: Bernhard Dernburg

Member of the Reichstag (Weimar Republic)
- In office 24 June 1920 – 5 January 1925
- Constituency: Magdeburg

(German Empire)
- In office 7 February 1912 – 9 November 1918
- Constituency: Magdeburg 5

Member of the Weimar National Assembly
- In office 6 February 1919 – 21 May 1920
- Constituency: Magdeburg

Personal details
- Born: 14 February 1860 Breslau, Kingdom of Prussia
- Died: 5 September 1954 (aged 94) West Berlin, West Germany
- Party: German Democratic Party
- Education: University of Breslau
- Occupation: Politician

Eugen Schiffer (14 February 1860 – 5 September 1954) was a German lawyer and liberal politician. He served as Minister of Finance and deputy head of government in the Weimar Republic from February to April 1919. From October 1919 to March 1920, he was again deputy head of government and Minister of Justice. In 1921, he once more became Minister of Justice. Schiffer was a founder-member of the liberal German Democratic Party (DDP) in 1918 and 1919 and co-founder in 1946 of its East German successor party, the Liberal Democratic Party of Germany (LDPD).

== Early life ==
Eugen Schiffer was born in Breslau in the Prussian Province of Silesia on 14 February 1860 as the son of Bernhard Schiffer (1830–1900, a merchant) and his wife Mathilde (1832–1888, née Kassel). Schiffer graduated from the Elisabeth-Gymnasium in Breslau with the Abitur and went on to study law at Breslau, Leipzig and Tübingen. He entered the Prussian judicial service in 1880 and after positions in Zabrze (Upper Silesia) and Magdeburg, became Kammergerichtsrat in Berlin in 1906. In 1910, Schiffer was promoted to Oberverwaltungsgerichtsrat.

In 1888, Schiffer married Bertha (1858-1919, née Buttermilch). They had two daughters (Mathilde, born in 1889, married Waldemar Koch in 1933) and a son. In 1896, the Jewish Schiffer converted to Protestantism.

== Political career ==
=== German Empire ===
During World War I, Schiffer was an adviser to General Wilhelm Groener and was in charge of the law department at the War Ministry. In October 1917, he became Unterstaatssekretär (Undersecretary) at the Reichsschatzamt (Treasury). At the same time, Schiffer was a delegate to the lower chamber of the Prussian diet for the National Liberal Party (1903-1918) and a member of the Reichstag from 1912 to 1917. His oratory skills, support from big industry and his ambitious nature made him a well known deputy. He was in favor of strengthening the power of the parliament, but as a monarchist, opposed the revolution.

=== Weimar Republic ===
Nevertheless, after the German Revolution he became Staatssekretär at the Treasury in November 1918. From 1918 to 1919, Schiffer was a founder-member of the German Democratic Party (DDP) and was a member and leader of the DDP parliamentary group in both the Weimar National Assembly (1919–1920) and the Reichstag (1920–1924). He also remained a delegate to the Landtag of Prussia until 1924.

From February 1919 until his resignation in April 1919, Schiffer was deputy to Ministerpräsident Philipp Scheidemann and Minister of Finance in the first democratically elected German government. During his time in office, Schiffer developed a temporary tax regime that provided the basis for what later became known as Erzbergersche Finanzreformen (named after Matthias Erzberger). Schiffer asked Scheidemann for his dismissal from the cabinet on 28 March 1919, giving "personal reasons". He also named disagreement about the creation and filling of several public sector positions as an issue.

After the Scheidemann cabinet resigned in June 1919 over the Treaty of Versailles, the DDP initially refused to become part of the Bauer cabinet, but in early October, the Democrats rejoined the Social Democratic Party of Germany (SPD) and Zentrum in government. As a result, Schiffer became Minister of Justice and, once again, deputy to the head of government, now with the title of Vice-Chancellor. He opposed plans to socialise industries and worked towards a fundamental reform of the civil service.

However, in March 1920, during the Kapp-Lüttwitz Putsch, Schiffer did not flee the capital with the majority of the cabinet. His role over the days of the putsch was controversial. Since he negotiated with the putschists without a formal mandate from the government, made promises in the name of President Friedrich Ebert and offered those responsible for the putsch amnesty, Schiffer was forced to resign by the SPD after the end of the putsch.

From May to October 1921, Schiffer was once again Minister of Justice in the first cabinet of Joseph Wirth. In 1921–1922, Schiffer was head of the German delegation at the negotiations with the Allies on Upper Silesia in Geneva that led to the treaty of 15 May 1922 securing trading rights and minority rights in the region. In 1922–1923, he was the German representative at the International Court of Justice in The Hague. In 1924, Schiffer supported the acceptance of the Dawes Plan.

In 1925, he resigned from the DDP and retired from active politics after an attempt to merge the parties of the political centre in a single Liberale Vereinigung.

== Later life ==
After retiring from politics, Schiffer focused on heading the Berliner Verwaltungsakademie, the first institution of higher learning for the German civil service, which he had helped found in 1921. He also practiced law, served as an adviser to the bank "Bankhaus Mendelssohn & Co." and was chairman of the board at Anhaltischen Kohlenwerke AG. In 1928, his book Die Deutsche Justiz launched a public debate over a judicial reform.

After having been initially left mostly alone by the Nazis due to the influence of highly placed advocates (Erich Seeberg, Johannes Popitz and Lutz Graf Schwerin von Krosigk), in 1943 he was forced, along with his daughter Marie, to move to the Berlin Jewish Hospital.

After the end of World War II, together with his son-in-law Waldemar Koch and Wilhelm Külz, Schiffer founded the Liberaldemokratische Partei Deutschlands (LDPD) in the Soviet-occupied sector of Berlin. For three years after August 1945, Schiffer headed the central administration of Justice (Justizverwaltung) under the Soviet military government. He then moved to West-Berlin.

Eugen Schiffer died in Berlin-Charlottenburg on 5 September 1954.

== Bibliography ==
- Der neueste Entwurf zur Reform der Strafverfahren, 1896
- Die Rechtskonsulenten, 1897
- Deutschlands Finanzlage und Steuerpolitik, 1918/1919
- Das erste Jahr der Revolution, 1919
- German-Polish conference on Upper Silesia, 1922
- Die Deutsche Justiz, Grundzüge einer durchgreifenden Reform, 1928
- Rudolf von Gneist, Ein Leben, 1929
- Sturm über Deutschland, 1932
- Die neue Verfassung des Deutschen Reiches, Eine politische Skizze, 1932
- Recht und Wirtschaft, 1948
- Ein Sofortprogramm für die deutsche Justiz, in: Neue Justiz (DDR), 1948
- Ein Leben für den Liberalismus, 1951 (autobiography)

Political offices
Preceded by Friedrich von Payer	Vice Chancellor of Germany; 1919	Succeeded by Bernhard Dernburg
Preceded by Matthias Erzberger	Vice Chancellor of Germany; 1919 – 1920	Succeeded by Erich Koch-Weser
