= Friedrich von Lindequist =

German colonial official (1862–1945)

Governor Lindequist

Friedrich von Lindequist (born 15 September 1862 in Wostevitz on Rügen; died 25 June 1945 at Macherslust near Eberswalde, Germany) was a high colonial official of the German Reich. He served as Governor of German South West Africa from November 1905 until 20 May 1907. During his tenure as Governor he introduced Karakul breeding to the white settlers of the German colony.

Lindequist later served in the Reichskolonialamt of Imperial Germany, as Undersecretary of State from 1907 to 1910. While serving in this post, he "led a commission to the highlands of German East Africa to study the feasibility of expanded settlement from Germany in the colony." He served as Secretary of State in 1910 and 1911. He also served in high political offices during the Third Reich.

== Selected works ==
- German East Africa as a Settlement Region for Europeans, Taking into Consideration British East Africa and Nyassaland (in German). Munich: Duncker & Humblot. 1912.

Government offices
Preceded by Lothar von Trotha (acting)	Governor of German South West Africa; 1905–1907	Succeeded by Bruno von Schuckmann
Political offices
Preceded by Bernhard Dernburg	Secretary for the Colonies; 1910–1911	Succeeded by Wilhelm Solf
