= Matthias Erzberger =

German politician (1875–1921)

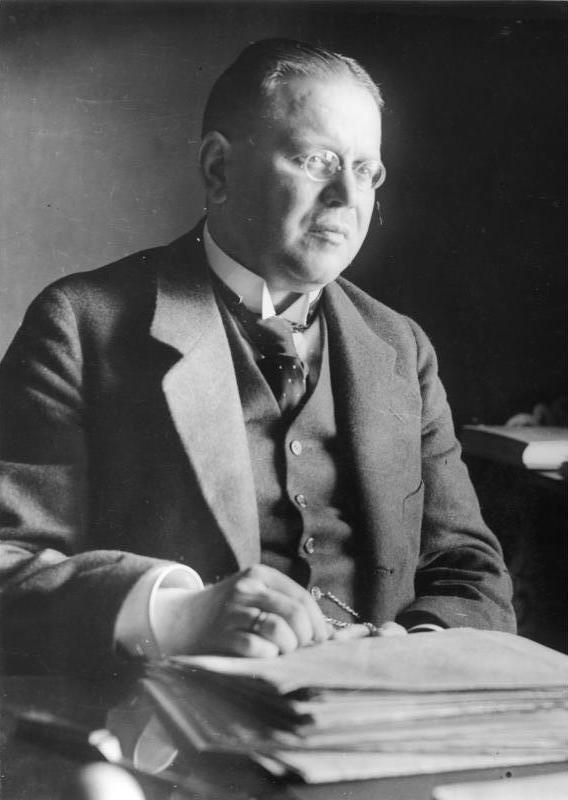
- Erzberger in 1919

Vice-Chancellor of Germany
- In office 21 June – 3 October 1919
- Chancellor: Gustav Bauer
- Preceded by: Bernhard Dernburg
- Succeeded by: Eugen Schiffer

Minister of Finance
- In office 21 June 1919 – 12 March 1920
- Chancellor: Gustav Bauer
- Preceded by: Bernhard Dernburg
- Succeeded by: Joseph Wirth

Minister without portfolio
- In office 3 October 1918 – 20 June 1919
- Chancellor: Max von Baden; Friedrich Ebert; Philipp Scheidemann (Minister-President)

Member of the Reichstag for Württemberg
- In office 24 June 1920 – 26 August 1921
- Preceded by: Constituency established
- Succeeded by: Hermann Eger

Member of the Reichstag for Württemberg 16
- In office 3 December 1903 – 9 November 1918
- Preceded by: Gebhard Braun
- Succeeded by: Constituency abolished

Personal details
- Born: 20 September 1875 Buttenhausen, Württemberg, German Empire
- Died: 26 August 1921 (aged 45) Bad Griesbach, Baden, Germany
- Cause of death: Assassination
- Party: Centre Party
- Occupation: Politician

Matthias Erzberger (20 September 1875 – 26 August 1921) was a German Centre Party politician who, from 1919-1920, served as the Minister of Finance and, in 1919, Vice Chancellor of Germany.

Erzberger was first elected to the Reichstag of the German Empire in 1903. During the early years of World War I he supported Germany's position enthusiastically but later became a leading opponent of unrestricted submarine warfare and proposed the successful 1917 Reichstag peace resolution, which called for a negotiated peace without annexations. In November 1918 he headed the German delegation to negotiate an end to the war with the Allies and was one of the signatories of the Armistice of 11 November 1918.

He was elected to the Weimar National Assembly in 1919 and served as a minister without portfolio in Philipp Scheidemann's cabinet. When Scheidemann resigned as minister president in protest over the terms of the Treaty of Versailles, Erzberger – who supported the treaty because he saw no alternative to it – became finance minister and vice-chancellor under Gustav Bauer. He pushed through the "Erzberger reforms" that transferred supreme taxing authority from the states to the central government and redistributed the tax burden more towards the wealthy. Under attack for corruption from a member of the right-wing German National People's Party, he was forced by the Centre Party to resign in March 1920 but was elected to the Reichstag of the Weimar Republic later in the year.

Both his role in ending the war and his financial policies earned him the enmity of the political right. On 26 August 1921, he was assassinated by two members of the right-wing terrorist group Organisation Consul.

== Early career ==
He was born on 20 September 1875 in Buttenhausen (today part of Münsingen) in the Kingdom of Württemberg, the son of Josef Erzberger (1847–1907), a tailor and postman, and his wife Katherina (née Flad; 1845–1916). In his early life he gained massive weight, which he lost during the next thirty years. He attended the seminaries in Schwäbisch Hall and Bad Saulgau, where he graduated in 1894, and started a career as a primary school (Volksschule) teacher. While teaching, he also studied constitutional law and economics at Fribourg, Switzerland. Two years later, he became a journalist working for the Catholic Centre party's publication Deutsches Volksblatt in Stuttgart, where he also worked as a freelance writer.

== Imperial Reichstag ==
Erzberger joined the Centre Party and was first elected to the German Reichstag in 1903 for Biberach. By virtue of unusually varied political activities, he took a leading position in the parliamentary party. He became a specialist in colonial policy and financial policy, contributing to the financial reforms of 1909. In 1912, Erzberger became a member of the leadership of the parliamentary party. He supported a significant military build-up in Germany in the years 1912–13. In response to concerns over a declining birth rate, Erzberger condemned birth control and advocated for the Bundesrat to ban trade in contraceptives.

In 1900, he married Paula Eberhard, daughter of a businessman, in Rottenburg am Neckar. They had three children (a son and two daughters).

== World War I ==
Like many others in his party, he initially supported Germany's involvement in World War I and was carried along by a wave of nationalistic enthusiasm. In September 1914, he wrote a memorandum in which he laid out his view on Germany's war aims, advocating the annexation of Belgium and parts of Lorraine, among other territories. By this stage he was secretary to the Reichstag's Military Affairs Committee, and the "right-hand man" of the Chancellor Theobald von Bethmann Hollweg.

He was in charge of foreign propaganda, especially relating to Catholic groups, and set up a system of information gathering using the resources of the Holy See and of the Freemasons. Erzberger was also involved in some diplomatic missions. For example, he worked with Bernhard von Bülow in a failed attempt to keep Italy from entering the war in 1915. He wrote letters to leading military authorities, later published, with extravagant plans for German annexations. Seen as an opportunist, he was said to have "no convictions, but only appetites".

On 25, 27, and 28 November, Erzberger spoke on modernizing the administration. He won widespread socialist support for attempting through the Bundesrat to protect the civil rights of citizens. In December 1916 he successfully used the Budget Committee of the Reichstag to navigate the Auxiliary Services Act into law. It required all men not in the military or working in certain areas of the economy to be employed in a job vital to the war effort and, in return, recognized trade unions as equal negotiating partners with employers.

Apart from Karl Liebknecht (a member of the Reichstag for the Social Democratic Party (SPD) until 1916), Erzberger was the only German politician who is known to have tried to stop the Armenian genocide, the persecution of the Greeks, and the Assyrian genocide in the Ottoman Empire. He travelled to Constantinople in February 1916 for negotiations with the Young Turks rulers allied with Germany, met Enver Pasha and Talaat Pasha on 10 February 1916, and at their request prepared a memorandum on the measures to be taken in favour of Christians in Turkey. It explicitly referred only to Catholic Armenians and was never answered or considered by the Ottoman government. The general failure of his mission in Turkey filled Erzberger with indignation and disappointment.

In 1916, Erzberger made a proposition that the sovereignty of the Holy See be restored by the House of Liechtenstein transferring the sovereignty of Liechtenstein to the Pope. The plan was supported by Pope Benedict XV, but was ultimately rejected by Franz, who acted on behalf of Johann II, Prince of Liechtenstein. The plan was unknown to the public until Erzberger published his book in 1920, which it was then received negatively.

By 1917, with the armies stalemated on both fronts, Erzberger changed his political stance, becoming one of the leading opponents of unrestricted submarine warfare. In April 1917 he met a Russian envoy in Stockholm to discuss peace terms. He expounded his views on the war in a speech in the Reichstag on 6 July in which he called on the government to renounce territorial ambitions and conclude a negotiated end to the war. The speech was remarkable at the time in the way he carefully delineated the extent of German military weakness. That same day, leading deputies from the Majority Social Democrats (MSPD), the Centre, and the liberal Progressive People's Party agreed to form an Inter-Party Committee as a coordinating body, which was seen as the prelude to the parliamentarization of Germany and accordingly interpreted by conservatives as the "beginning of the revolution". The Committee, with the help of Ebert's oratory, galvanized moderate opponents of the 'war party' and served to pacify the working class.

On 9/10 July Bethmann Hollweg obtained a promise from the Crown Council and Emperor Wilhelm II that equal manhood suffrage would be introduced in Prussia after the war to replace the Prussian three-class franchise which apportioned votes based on taxes paid. The promise became known to the public on 12 July.

Erzberger's actions during the first half of July helped to bring about the fall of Bethmann Hollweg. He hoped to have him replaced by Bernhard von Bülow. Instead, Georg Michaelis, the largely unknown and party-unaffiliated nominee of General Erich Ludendorff, became chancellor.

On 19 July Erzberger called a vote on the Reichstag peace resolution which embodied all the points he had made in his speech, calling for a peace without annexations or indemnities, freedom of the seas and international arbitration. The resolution passed 212 to 126. It received the support of Chancellor Michaelis, but when he spoke of supporting it in his inaugural address, he added the proviso "as I interpret it", which he then used as an excuse to ignore it. Erzberger nevertheless succeeded in his main purpose in proposing the resolution, namely to persuade the Social Democrats to continue voting for war loans while a negotiated peace was sought. At the same time, the annexationists, especially those of the nascent German Fatherland Party, began a "wild agitation" against Erzberger. The fact that he succeeded in creating a majority consisting of the Centre, the Progressive Party, and the Social Democrats is considered one of his greatest achievements, since this represented a fundamental upheaval in German domestic politics. Parliament had become involved in matters of foreign policy and warfare that under the constitution were reserved for the emperor, the military leadership and the government. Erzberger emerged from the proceedings surrounding the peace resolution as Germany's most powerful deputy. His attempt to end the war with an amicable peace contributed to his great popularity, especially among the underprivileged classes. On the other hand, he became the most hated man among large sections of the upper classes and in circles that did not want to renounce annexations and rejected demands for a change in Germany's social and political structure.

That same July, at a closed conference in Frankfurt, Erzberger revealed the content of a pessimistic secret report from Austria-Hungary's Foreign Minister, Count Ottokar Czernin, to Austrian Emperor Karl I regarding the state of the war effort. The report also came into the possession of the Allies. Although it has never been proven that Erzberger was responsible, it led to the extreme right seeing him as a traitor to his country.

In March 1918, Erzberger was the most influential supporter in government of the candidacy of Wilhelm, Duke of Urach for the proposed throne of the stillborn Kingdom of Lithuania. Both were Catholics from Württemberg. He tabled a question in the Reichstag on 3 March to General Wilhelm Groener on whether a memorandum had been prepared for the reform of the War Contracting System.

Erzberger's political attempts at peace failed, but his public attack on the war effort and dissemination of information about the fragility of the German military created a climate in which the government found it increasingly difficult to maintain the belief that the war could be won. When, towards the end of the war, the German Navy mutinied at Kiel, the sailors informed their officers that what they wanted was "Erzberger", by then synonymous with "peace".

== Signing the Armistice ==
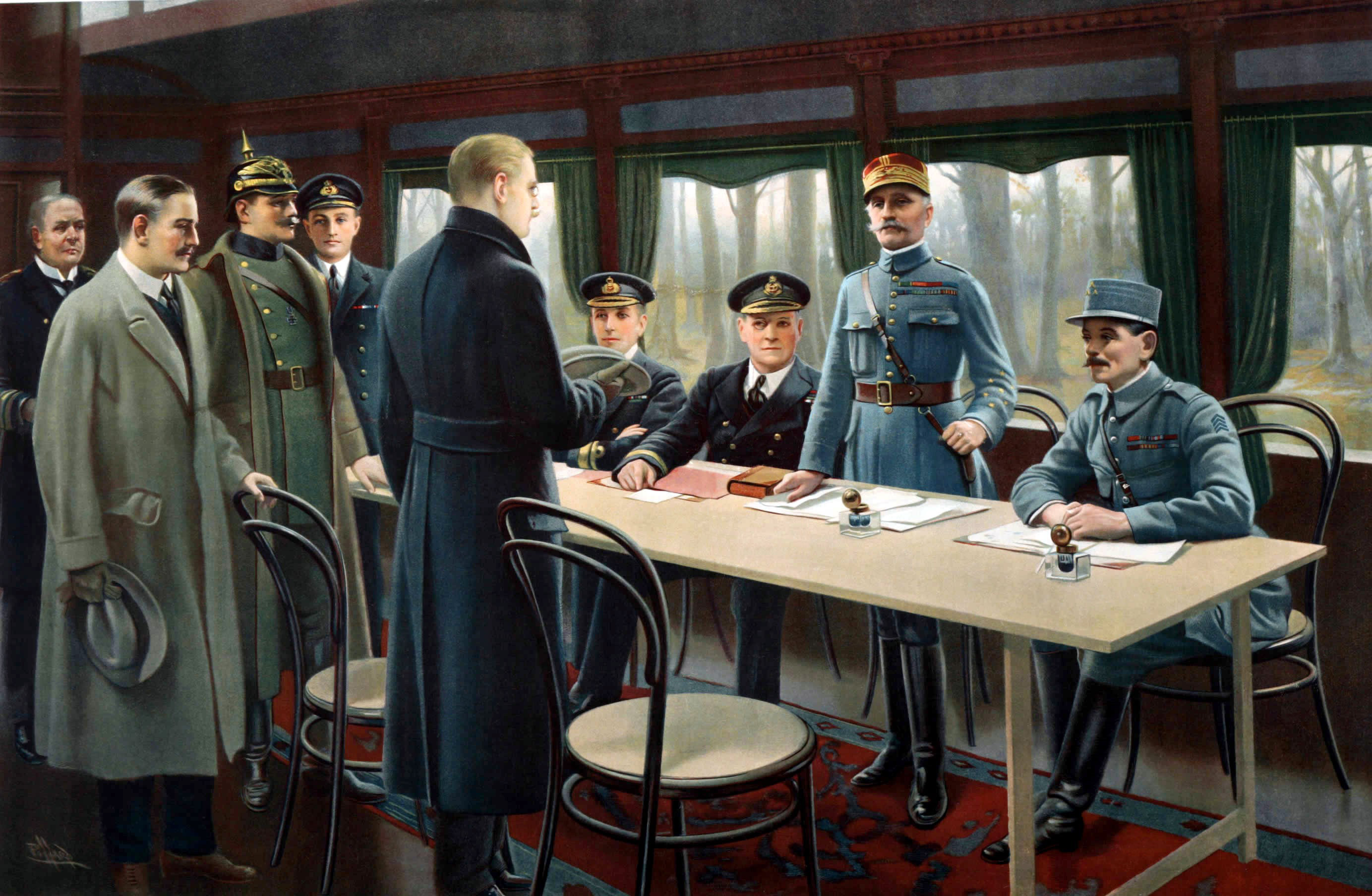
A painting depicting the signing of the armistice. Behind the table are Rear-admiral George Hope, Admiral Rosslyn Wemyss, Marshal Ferdinand Foch and General Maxime Weygand. In front of the table are Erzberger, Generalmajor Detlof von Winterfeldt, Alfred von Oberndorff and Ernst Vanselow. Behind them stands Captain Jack Marriot.

On 3 October 1918, Erzberger entered the government of Prince Maximilian von Baden as a state secretary (equivalent to a minister) without a specified portfolio. On 6 November 1918, a reluctant Erzberger was appointed chairman of the Armistice Commission sent to negotiate with the Allies in the Forest of Compiègne. Prince Max supposed that Erzberger, as a Catholic civilian, would be more acceptable to the allies than a Prussian military officer. He believed that Erzberger's reputation as a man of peace was unassailable.

Against hopes that Erzberger would be able to obtain better conditions from the Allies, Marshal Ferdinand Foch, the chief Allied negotiator, was unwilling to make any concessions, with the exception of a slight extension of the time allotted to the German army to withdraw. Erzberger was unsure whether he should hold out for further changes in Germany's favour. On 10 November, Paul von Hindenburg himself telegraphed back that the armistice should be signed, with or without modifications, and a while later the new Chancellor, the Social Democrat Friedrich Ebert, telegraphed Erzberger to authorize him to sign.

As the head of the German delegation, he signed the armistice ending World War I at Compiègne on 11 November 1918 with Foch. He made a short speech on the occasion, protesting the harshness of the terms, and concluded by saying that "a nation of seventy millions can suffer, but it cannot die." Foch ignored Erzberger's attempt to shake his hand and is said to have replied, "Très bien" ("very well").

== After the war ==
Returning to Berlin, Erzberger agreed to remain Chairman of the Armistice Commission, a difficult and humiliating task. He fell out with Ulrich von Brockdorff-Rantzau, first Foreign Minister of the Weimar Republic, in early 1919 for advocating the handing over of Karl Radek, the Bolshevik diplomat and agitator, to the Entente following the failure of the Spartacus Uprising.

After the elections for the Weimar National Assembly in January 1919, Erzberger entered the government of the German Republic led by Philipp Scheidemann, again as minister without a specified portfolio, but responsible for matters relating to the armistice. When Scheidemann resigned over the harsh terms of Treaty of Versailles and a new government led by Gustav Bauer took over on 21 June 1919, Erzberger became finance minister and vice chancellor. After the Weimar Constitution came into force in August 1919, Erzberger remained in that position. He supported the Treaty of Versailles, as he saw no military or political alternatives. He was treated with particular contempt by the nationalist right wing as the man who had signed what was coming to be viewed as a humiliating and unnecessary surrender.

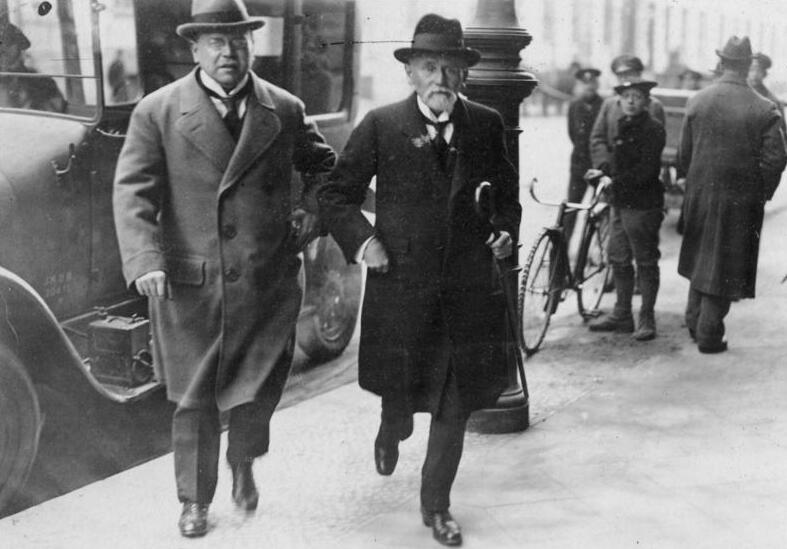
Erzberger and Minister Eduard David in Berlin, May 1919

However, he succeeded in pushing new taxation measures through the National Assembly. In July 1919, Erzberger introduced what became known as "Erzberger finance reform". The reform pursued two goals. First, it was to give the German federal government supreme authority to tax and spend and thus end the dependence of the central government on the constituent states, as in the former German Empire. Second, Erzberger aimed for a significant redistribution of the tax burden, lightening the burden on low- to moderate income households. In July 1919, war levies on income and wealth were introduced, as well as the first German inheritance tax.

In December 1919, an additional one-time "emergency" tax on wealth was levied, causing outrage among the better-off. In March 1920, a federal income tax followed. Its high tax rates made Erzberger even more unpopular with many on the right.

The German tax code still bears Erzberger's imprint. He stabilized national finances, although they remained strained by the burden of war reparations. He also reformed and unified the previously independent state railway administrations into the German Reichsbahn, which began to make a profit for the first time and helped pay the war reparations.

In his disputes with the political right, Erzberger set himself in particularly sharp opposition to the German National People's Party (the old conservatives), on whom he laid the responsibility for the war; the result was a personal dispute with the leader of the Nationalists, the war-time state secretary for the treasury, Karl Helfferich, who published a brochure titled "Fort mit Erzberger!" ("Get rid of Erzberger!"), and Erzberger was ultimately compelled to bring an action against Helfferich for slander. The case was heard in a Berlin court from 19 January to 12 March 1920.

The action resulted in a small fine for Helfferich. German law did not make provision for any damages or penalties for slander. The court, however, in its judgment of 12 March 1920, took the line that Helfferich's allegations regarding Erzberger's corrupt business practices and untruthful statements were partly justified. Erzberger was consequently compelled by his party to resign his ministerial office and to give up his seat in the National Assembly in March 1920.

=== Erzberger assassination attempt ===
During the trial, Erzberger was wounded in an assassination attempt by a young army ensign named Oltwig von Hirschfeld as he left the court on 26 January 1920. Hirschfeld, "recently subjected to compulsory demobilisation and determined to 'deal with' the most prominent of the 'Versailles traitors'", fired two shots at Erzberger, the first of which "inflicted a shoulder wound, while the second was deflected by the minister's watch chain." Although he was immediately apprehended, Hirschfeld was convicted "not of attempted murder but of 'dangerous bodily harm' [...] and sentenced to a mere eighteen months in prison, then paroled after four months on 'health grounds'".

Erzberger was once more returned to the Reichstag, which replaced the National Assembly, at the general election of June 1920, but in accordance with the wish of his party, he abstained from immediate participation in politics, as proceedings had been instituted against him on a charge of evading taxation. In 1920, he published a memorandum endeavouring to justify his position during the war, and he followed it up with disclosures regarding the attitude of the Holy See in 1917 and the mission of the papal legate in Munich, Eugenio Pacelli (later Pope Pius XII).

Erzberger's power in German politics was based on his great influence with the Catholic working classes in the Rhineland, Westphalia, central Germany and Silesia. In the industrial regions of these districts, the Catholic workers were organized in their own trade unions on lines of very advanced social policy, and Erzberger became the leading exponent of their views in the Reichstag and on public platforms. He incurred the strong opposition of the conservative and landed section of the Catholics, some of the higher clergy such Cardinal Archbishop Felix von Hartmann of Cologne, and the Bavarian agricultural interests as represented by the Catholic Bavarian People's Party in the State Diet at Munich and in the Reichstag in Berlin. Erzberger also was the leader of the left wing of the Centre Party with Joseph Wirth. At a Reich party committee meeting, he said that "Left is life, Right is death."

Erzberger continued to be pursued by the relentless animosity of the reactionary parties, the conservatives and the national liberals of the German People's Party. This hostility, which amounted to a vendetta, was based not so much upon Erzberger's foreign policy – his negotiation of the Armistice terms and the decisive influence which he exercised in securing the acceptance of the Treaty of Versailles – as upon his financial policies. He was suspect for his activities as finance minister in 1919, as the supporter of liberal Catholic trade unions and, it was said, as political adviser of the Catholic Chancellor of the Reich, Joseph Wirth, who prepared a fresh scheme of taxation designed to impose new burdens upon capital and upon the prosperous landed interests in the summer of 1921.

== Assassination ==
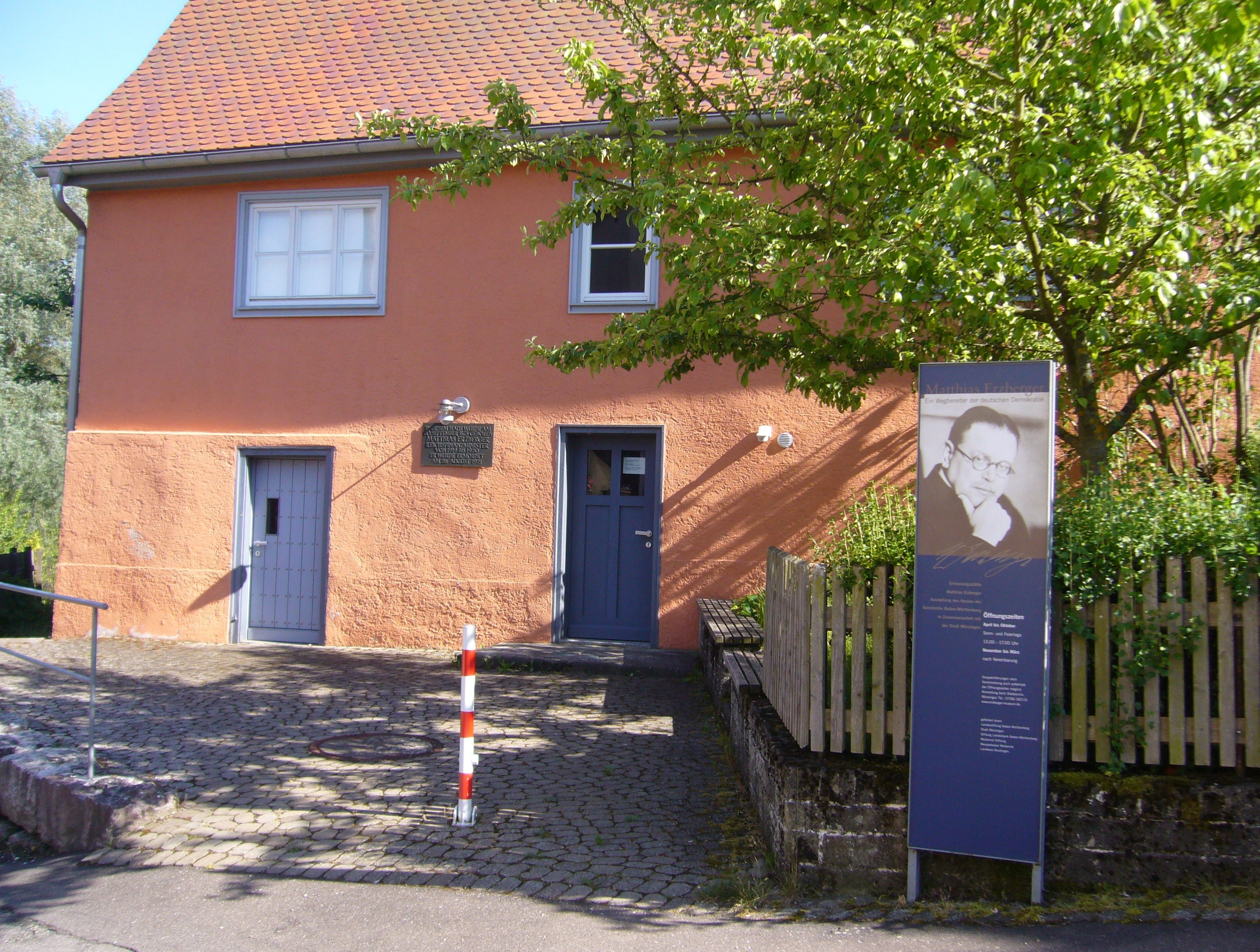
Erzberger's birthplace in Buttenhausen is now a small museum.

The denunciations of the conservative and national liberal press went beyond the ordinary limits of party polemics. The Tägliche Rundschau observed, in allusion to Erzberger's appearance, "he may be as round as a bullet, but he is not bullet-proof". These attacks ultimately climaxed in Erzberger's murder on 26 August 1921 in Bad Griesbach, a spa in the Black Forest (Baden), while he was out walking with his friend and Centre Party colleague Carl Diez.

The pair were accosted in broad daylight by two men armed with revolvers who "fired shots at Erzberger's head and chest. Erzberger leaped down the slope by the road, but three further shots hit him in his lung, stomach, and leg. The murderers then ran down the slope themselves and fired more shots at him. Diez was also hit in the chest, but was able to return, bleeding, to the hotel and relate what had happened."

Because Erzberger signed the armistice of 1918, many on the political right regarded him as a traitor. Manfred von Killinger, a leading member of the Germanenorden, masterminded his killing by recruiting two members – Heinrich Tillessen and Heinrich Schulz – of the ultra-nationalist death squad Organisation Consul. The assassins were former Imperial German Navy officers and members of the disbanded Marinebrigade Ehrhardt. Erzberger's assassins were later smuggled into Hungary and were prosecuted only after World War II. His funeral turned into a political rally, at which one of the speakers was Joseph Wirth. Erzberger is buried in the Catholic cemetery of Biberach an der Riss.

== Legacy ==
Erzberger was instrumental in preparing the German nation for peace and in ensuring that the Catholic Centre Party, the predecessor of today's Christian Democratic Union, retained a modicum of power in an increasingly radicalized Germany. His financial, federal, and rail reforms transformed Germany. Erzberger, with his optimism and sense of responsibility, never retreated even in the face of the most difficult tasks.

His greatest, and most tragic legacy, was the signature on the Armistice. Despite military pressure on him to sign as soon as possible, this was pointed out for decades afterwards as evidence for the Dolchstoßlegende (stab-in-the-back myth), which portrayed the surrender as betrayal by the civilians on the home front, especially by Socialist politicians for personal gain, undermining the German Army's will to fight. Later the stab-in-the-back legend helped propel to power Adolf Hitler, who made it an integral part of Nazi propaganda. For his role, Erzberger was branded as one of the "November Criminals".

Erzberger is the central character of Thomas Keneally's Booker Prize-shortlisted 1975 novel Gossip from the Forest, which focuses on the signing of the Armistice at Compiègne.

In the 2022 film All Quiet on the Western Front, Erzberger is portrayed by Daniel Brühl.

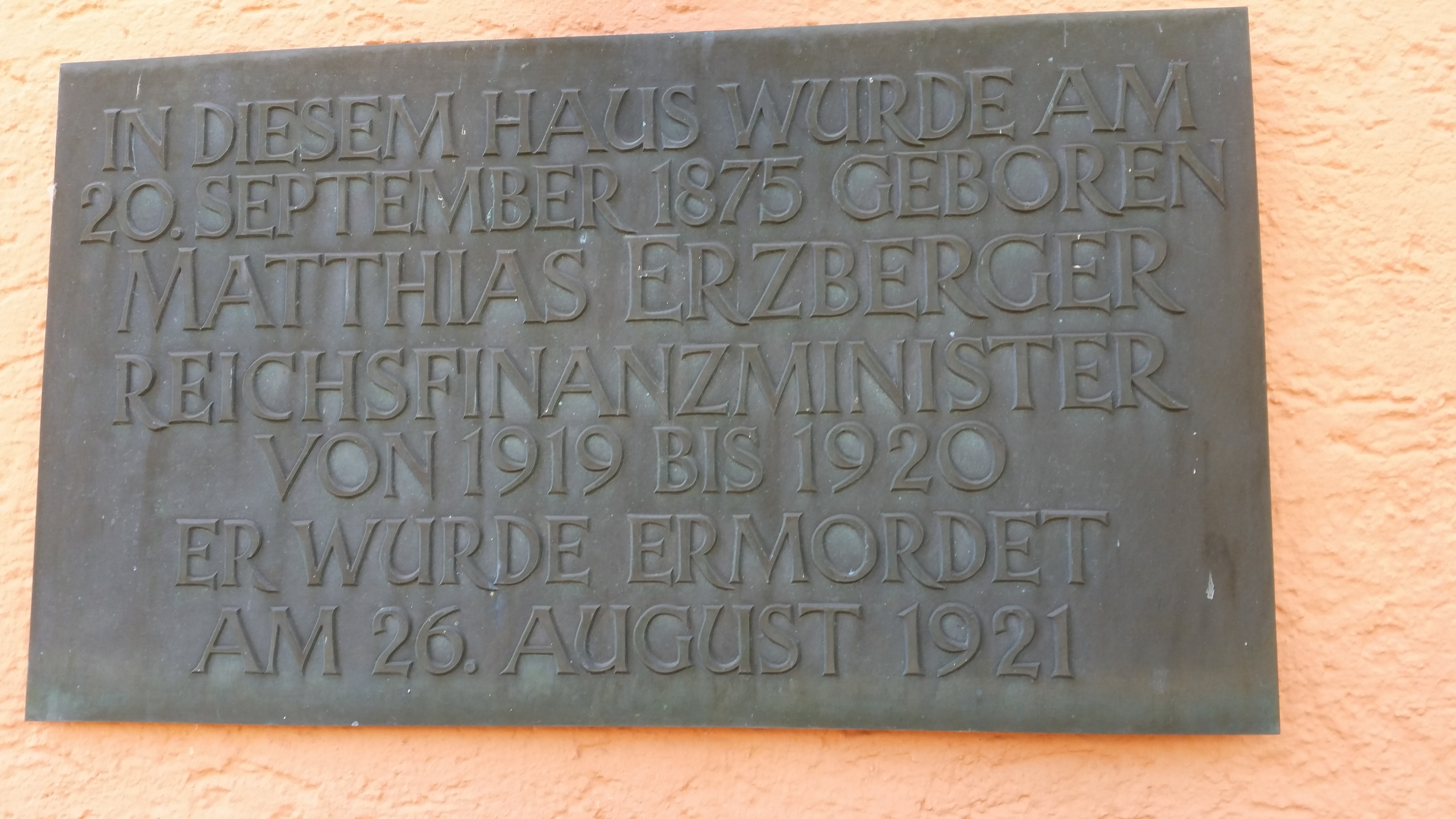
Inscription at the memorial

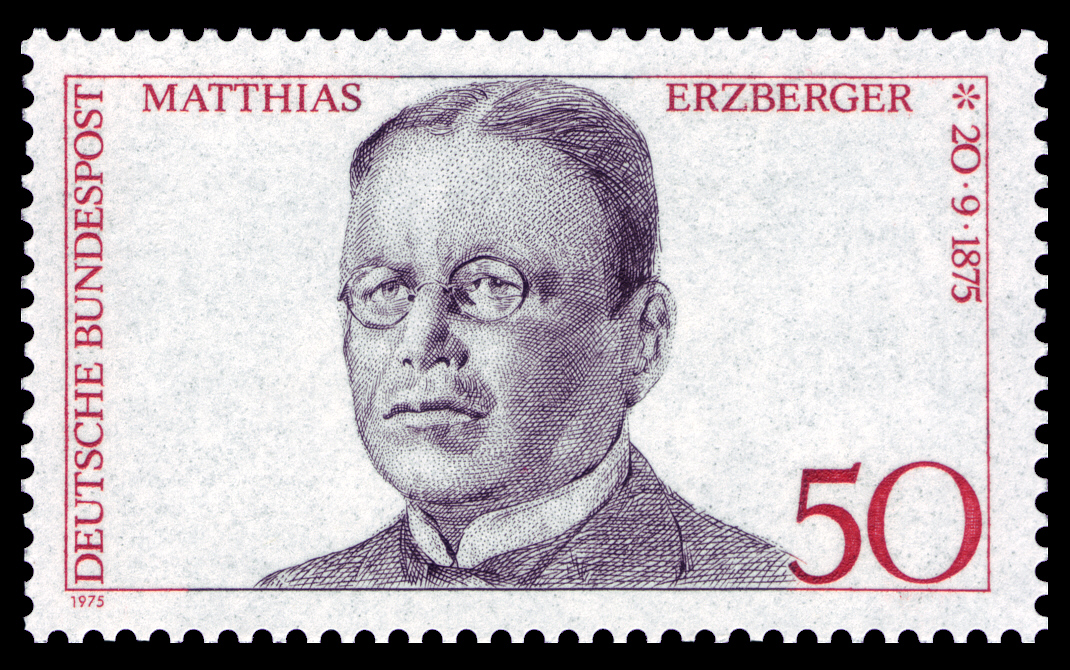
A stamp of the German Federal Post 1975

Political offices
Preceded by Bernhard Dernburg	Vice Chancellor of Germany; 1919	Succeeded by Eugen Schiffer
