= Imperial Colonial Office =

Germen government office 1907–1919

- Reichskolonialamt
- Service flag of the Colonial Office

Agency overview
- Formed: 17 May 1907
- Dissolved: 20 February 1919
- Superseding agency: Imperial Colonial Ministry
- Jurisdiction: Reich Chancellery
- Headquarters: Wilhelmstrasse 62; Berlin
- Agency executive: Bernhard Dernburg (1907–1910) Friedrich von Lindequist (1910–1911) Wilhelm Solf (1911–1918), Secretaries of State

The Imperial Colonial Office or Reich Colonial Office (German: Reichskolonialamt) was a governmental agency of the German Empire tasked with managing Germany's overseas territories. Dissolved after World War I, on 20 February 1919 the Reich Colonial Ministry (Reichskolonialministerium) of the German Weimar Republic replaced the Imperial Colonial Office, dealing with settlements and closing-out of affairs of the occupied and lost colonies.

== Development and reorganization ==
From its inception in 1884, a colonial service organization performed administrative functions (policy and management) for the executive arm of the imperial government. By order of Reich Chancellor Leo von Caprivi on 1 April 1890, responsibility for the colonial service was with the Colonial Department (Kolonialabteilung), still as a subsection in the German Foreign Office (Auswärtiges Amt), but led by a head of section answerable to the Chancellor. By the law of 18 July 1896 the department further co-supervised the colonial military or protection force, the Schutztruppe, with its headquarters (Kommando der Schutztruppen) formerly billeted in the Imperial Naval Office (Reichsmarineamt). By the late 19th century the need evolved for a separate, higher ranking agency that shall report directly to the Reich Chancellor.

A decree by Emperor Wilhelm II of 17 May 1907 removed the Colonial Department together with the Schutztruppe command from the Foreign Office and elevated it to a central authority in its own right, the Reichskolonialamt, to be managed by a cabinet-level Secretary of State. The new office was then physically relocated to a building on Berlin’s Wilhelmstrasse No. 62 (demolished in 1938) near Wilhelmplatz, where the Colonial Department of the Foreign Office had resided since 1905. The Schutztruppe command structure was also reorganized and moved to Mauerstrasse No. 45/46, in close proximity of the Reichskolonialamt location. This legislation represented a complete reorganization and was a direct response to the nationwide so-called "Hottentot election", after allegations of colonial malfeasance, corruption and brutality (e.g. the Herero and Namaqua Genocide in German South-West Africa) surfaced in the German print media and culminated in the dissolution of the Reichstag parliament. The shake-up subsequently involved extensive and wide-ranging personnel changes in civil service positions in the colonies.

The newly established Reichskolonialamt led by Secretary of State Bernhard Dernburg reported directly to the head of government, the Reich Chancellor.

=== Heads of the Kolonialabteilung in the Foreign Office ===
- Friedrich Richard Krauel (1848–1918), in office 1 April 1890 – 30 June 1890
- Paul Kayser (1845–1898), in office 1 July 1890 – 14 October 1896
- Oswald von Richthofen (1847–1906), in office 15 October 1896 – 31 March 1898
- Gerhard von Buchka (1851–1935), in office 1 April 1898 – 12 June 1900
- Oscar Wilhelm Stübel (1846–1921), in office 12 June 1900 – 16 November 1905
- Ernst II, Prince of Hohenlohe-Langenburg (1863–1950), in office 16 November 1905 – 5 July 1906
- Bernhard Dernburg (1865–1937), in office 5 September 1906 – 16 May 1907

=== Reichskolonialamt secretaries of state ===
- Bernhard Dernburg (1865–1937), in office 17 May 1907 – 9 June 1910
- Friedrich von Lindequist (1862–1945), in office 10 June 1910 – 3 November 1911
- Wilhelm Solf (1862–1936), in office 20 December 1911 – 13 December 1918
- Johannes Bell (1868–1949), Colonial Political Envoy at the Paris Peace Conference from 13 February 1919 to 20 June 1919

== Structure ==
The new Reichskolonialamt had three departments Abteilungen:

- Department A dealt with general political, policy and administrative functions
- Department B managed fiscal, transport and technical tasks
- Department C was concerned with personnel matters
- The subordinated Kolonialhauptkasse main cashiers bureau dealt with disbursements, payrolls and other financial transactions
- The headquarters command of the Schutztruppe was often seen as the quasi fourth department, with colonial governors nominally the superiors of troop commanders in the field

The Kolonialrat colonial advisory board was replaced in 1908 (after the major reorganizations of 1907) by a panel of independent experts. A Landeskundliche Kommission scientific and geographic commission for exploration functioned for several years before its mission was modified and replaced in 1911 by the Ständige Wirtschaftliche Kommission permanent economic commission. Further commissions were formed by the German Agriculture Council and tasked with advising the colonial office.

The records of the Reichskolonialamt and other documents from the colonies are now preserved at the branch location at Berlin-Lichterfelde of the German Federal Archives and were previously held at the Deutsches Zentralarchiv, Potsdam, an agency of the former East German regime.

== See also ==
- List of German colonial ministers
