= Philipp Scheidemann =

German politician (1865–1939)

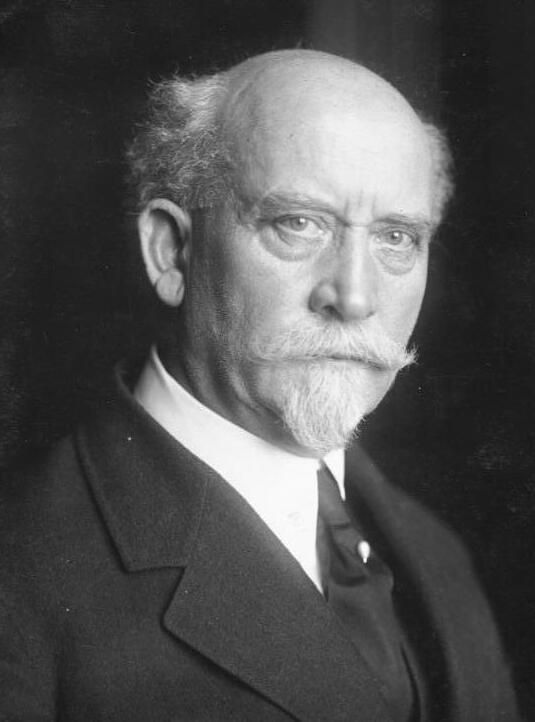
- Scheidemann c. 1918

Minister President of Germany
- In office 13 February 1919 – 20 June 1919
- President: Friedrich Ebert
- Deputy: Eugen Schiffer; Bernhard Dernburg
- Preceded by: Friedrich Ebert (de facto)
- Succeeded by: Gustav Bauer

Mayor of Kassel
- In office 19 November 1919 – 1 October 1925
- Preceded by: Erich Koch-Weser
- Succeeded by: Herbert Stadler

Minister for the Colonies
- In office 13 December 1918 – 13 February 1919
- Chancellor: Friedrich Ebert
- Preceded by: Wilhelm Solf
- Succeeded by: Johannes Bell

State Secretary without Portfolio
- In office 4 October 1918 – 9 November 1918
- Chancellor: Max von Baden
- Preceded by: Office established
- Succeeded by: Office abolished

Leader of the Social Democratic Party
- In office 20 October 1917 – 15 June 1919
- Serving with: Friedrich Ebert
- Preceded by: Hugo Haase
- Succeeded by: Herman Müller; Otto Wels

Member of the Reichstag for Hesse-Nassau
- In office 6 February 1919 – 22 March 1933
- 1919–1920: Weimar National Assembly
- Preceded by: Constituency established
- Succeeded by: Constituency abolished

Member of the Reichstag for Düsseldorf 3
- In office 3 December 1903 – 9 November 1918
- Preceded by: Louis Sabin
- Succeeded by: Constituency abolished

Co-Chairman of the Council of the People's Deputies
- In office 29 December 1918 - 11 February 1919 Serving with Friedrich Ebert
- Preceded by: Hugo Haase
- Succeeded by: Himself (as Minister President of Germany)

Personal details
- Born: Philipp Heinrich Scheidemann; 26 July 1865 Kassel, Electorate of Hesse, German Confederation
- Died: 29 November 1939 (aged 74) Copenhagen, Denmark
- Party: SPD (1883–1939)
- Spouse: Johanna Dibbern
- Children: Lina; Liese; Hedwig

Philipp Heinrich Scheidemann (26 July 1865 – 29 November 1939) was a German politician of the Social Democratic Party of Germany (SPD). In the first quarter of the 20th century, he played a leading role in both his party and in the young Weimar Republic. During the German Revolution of 1918–1919 that broke out after Germany's defeat in World War I, Scheidemann proclaimed the German Republic from a balcony of the Reichstag building. In 1919, he was elected Reich Minister President by the National Assembly meeting in Weimar to write a constitution for the republic. He resigned the office the same year due to a lack of unanimity in the cabinet on whether or not to accept the terms of the Treaty of Versailles.

Scheidemann continued to be a member of the Reichstag until 1933 and served as mayor of his native city of Kassel from 1920 to 1925. After Adolf Hitler and the Nazi Party came to power in 1933, he went into exile because he was considered one of the "November criminals" held to be responsible for Germany's defeat in the war and the collapse of the German Empire. While in exile, he wrote extensively about German politics. He died in Copenhagen, Denmark, in 1939.

== Early life ==
Philipp Scheidemann was born in Kassel on 26 July 1865, the son of the upholsterer Friedrich Scheidemann (1842–1879) and his wife Wilhelmine (née Pape, 1842–1907). He had two sisters.

Scheidemann attended elementary and secondary schools between 1871 and 1879. After the death of his father in 1879, the family fell into poverty. Following his school education, he completed an apprenticeship as a typesetter and letterpress printer from 1879 to 1883. Until he was thirty years old he worked in the book printing trade as a typesetter's assistant and then as master typesetter in the printing shop of the Gotthelft brothers in Kassel, which published the Casseler Tageblatt, a local newspaper.

In 1883, Scheidemann joined the SPD, which had been banned under the Anti-Socialist Laws of Otto von Bismarck, and became a member of the Free Trade Union of Book Printers. Between 1888 and 1895, he was an honorary district chairman of the book printers' association in Marburg. There, he also continued his education at the University of Marburg. The philosopher Hermann Cohen, who taught there, is said to have made a lasting impression on him.

In 1889, Scheidemann married Johanna Dibbern (1864–1926) in Kassel. They had three daughters: Lina (1889–1933), Liese (1891–1955), and Hedwig (1893–1935).

In 1895, he gave up the profession he had learned and became active in various social democratic newspapers. First, he worked as an editor for the Mitteldeutsche Sonntagszeitung in Giessen, from 1900 for the Fränkische Tagespost in Nuremberg, from 1902 for the Offenbacher Abendblatt (Offenbach am Main), and finally from 1905 for the Casseler Volksblatt in his hometown. In addition to political articles, Scheidemann wrote "Dialect Stories" every Sunday from 1909 under the pseudonym Henner Piffendeckel. He also published several books in the Kassel dialect.

== Rise in the SPD and the Reichstag ==
In the 1903 Reichstag elections, Scheidemann entered the Reichstag of the German Empire for the constituency Düsseldorf 3, the city and district of Solingen. He was reelected in January 1907 and January 1912. From 1906 to 1911, he also held a seat as a city councilor in his hometown of Kassel. In 1911, he was elected to the SPD's executive committee, of which he remained a member until 1918; he resigned his municipal mandate because the election required that he move to Berlin. After the death in 1913 of August Bebel, the long-time leader of the SPD, Scheidemann took over the chairmanship of the SPD parliamentary group together with Hugo Haase. He held the position until 1918. In 1912, Scheidemann became the first Social Democrat to be elected one of the vice presidents of the Reichstag, but since he refused to make the inaugural visit to the emperor – the "going to court" that the party had always frowned on – he was unable to take office. It was not until June to October 1918 that he actually held the office.

Unlike Friedrich Ebert, who became party co-chairman with Hugo Haase in 1913, Scheidemann had rhetorical talent. He could speak convincingly before mass meetings as well as small audiences. Wilhelm Keil, a friend and party comrade of both men, described Ebert as "always serious, dignified and energetic", while Scheidemann was a "brilliant rhetorician with somewhat boisterous manners [...] which at times allowed doubts to arise as to what percentage of his seemingly holy fire was to be ascribed to theatricality". Scheidemann's down-to-earth manners, his sense of humor and unshakeable cheerfulness earned him recognition outside the party.

His political style was on the pragmatic side. Whenever he could, he avoided conflicts in which he saw little hope of resolution. He championed a cause only when it seemed possible that he would be successful in it. Before World War I, he was a regular speaker on budgetary and army issues and regarded as a representative of the party's center. When he directed sharp attacks against the imperial Hohenzollern family in the Reichstag in 1912, Reich Chancellor Theobald von Bethmann Hollweg and the members of the Bundesrat who were present left the hall in protest. On several occasions, Scheidemann represented German social democracy at congresses abroad. Publicity trips took him to France, Switzerland, and the United States.

A speech given by Scheidemann in Paris in 1912 caused a great public stir and was published in Germany in a distorted form to defame him specifically and the Social Democrats in general as "traitors to the fatherland". In a Reichstag debate on 3 December 1912, Scheidemann's party colleague Eduard David felt compelled to reproduce the true wording of Scheidemann's disputed statements:

"Against those who try to push us down into the bestiality of a European war, we will defend ourselves with the courage of despair. The German workers and socialists also respect and love the French proletarians and socialists like brothers. [...] Our enemy is [...] in another place. It is where yours also is. That is capitalism. Let us wage the struggle together, comrades, for the progress of humanity, for the freedom of labor, for world peace."

== World War I ==
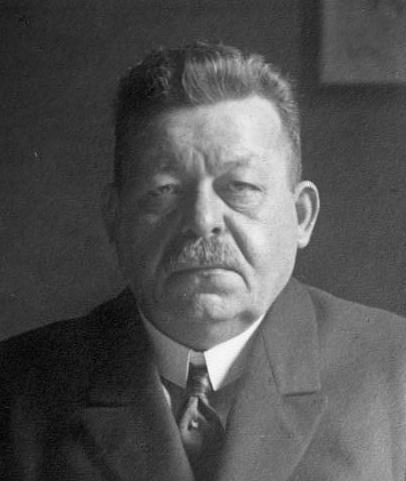
Friedrich Ebert

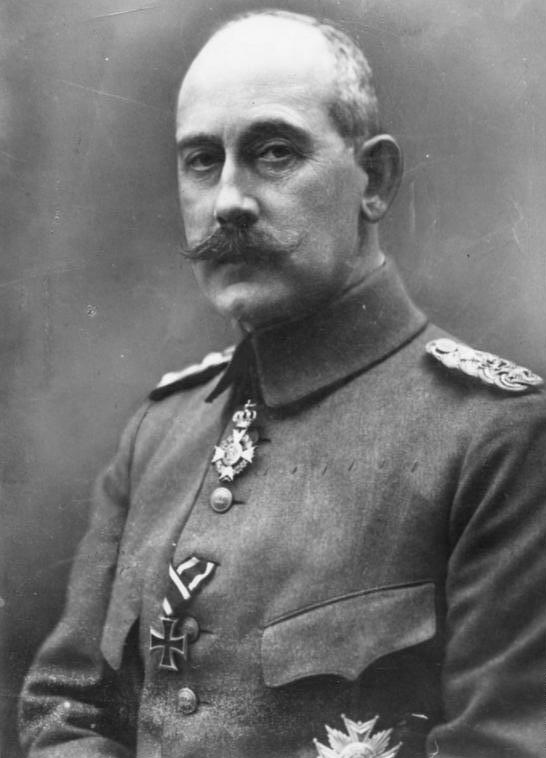
Prince Maximilian von Baden

During World War I, Scheidemann represented a middle line between the right and left wings of the SPD. In principle, he supported the approval of war credits, but he opposed a victorious peace and advocated a negotiated peace without annexations. His statement "What is French shall remain French, what is Belgian shall remain Belgian, what is German shall remain German" was called high treason in militarist-nationalist circles. Representatives of the German Fatherland Party in particular declared that they wanted to "hang" Scheidemann.

In January 1915, Scheidemann expressed his anger at elements in the SPD who could not bear to hear the word "fatherland". His statement was preceded by Karl Liebknecht's breach of party discipline when, in December 1914, he voted against a war loan bill. Hugo Haase defended Liebknecht at the time, and he received numerous expressions of sympathy from within the SPD. The idea of a negotiated peace ("Scheidemann Plan"), however, could no longer prevent a split within the SPD on the issue of continued funding for the war. In April 1917, the party's anti-war left wing formed the Independent Social Democratic Party of Germany (USPD), while the SPD itself was renamed the Majority Social Democratic Party of Germany (MSPD). In Scheidemann's constituency of Solingen, the SPD organization joined the USPD and called on Scheidemann – without success – to resign his Reichstag seat. From October 1917, with the Würzburg Party Congress, Scheidemann was MSPD party chairman alongside Friedrich Ebert.

In view of the worsening social hardships of the working class caused by the war, the SPD had been pressing since the beginning of 1917 to fulfill its promise of a political reorganization of Germany. Negotiations began between Scheidemann, Conrad Haussmann of the center-left German Democratic Party, and Gustav Stresemann of the National Liberal Party to form a left-wing parliamentary majority with the goal of giving the Reich a true parliamentary form of government with ministers responsible to it rather than the emperor. Scheidemann accommodated the bourgeois parties to the point of saying that he believed he could, if necessary, envision a parliamentary system with a monarch at its head. One result of the negotiations was the passage of the Reichstag Peace Resolution on 19 July 1917 by 212 votes to 126. It called for peace negotiations without demands for annexations.

To prevent radicalization at home, Scheidemann, Friedrich Ebert and Otto Braun joined the leadership of the January strikes of 1918 in which over a million workers demanded better living and working conditions, an end to the war and a democratization of the constitution. Their action earned the three men the hatred of the political right.

As parliamentary group chairman and leading figure of his party in the inter-party committee, Scheidemann played a significant role in ousting the government of Reich Chancellor Georg von Hertling in September 1918. Scheidemann and Ebert, however, had differing opinions about how to proceed. When politicians from the Progressive People's Party brought Prince Maximilian von Baden into the discussion as Reich chancellor, Scheidemann said that the Social Democrats could not be expected to put a prince at the head of the government. On 3 October 1918, "at the moment when the circumstances were the worst possible", Scheidemann opposed Social Democratic participation in the government. Friedrich Ebert finally persuaded the majority of the parliamentary group to agree to the MSPD's entry into von Baden's cabinet. It was the first time members of the SPD had served in the imperial government, although since 1912 the party had had the most seats in the Reichstag of any party.

Despite his reservations, Scheidemann and other leading politicians in the parliamentary majority became state secretaries without portfolio in the von Baden cabinet. Scheidemann was chosen for the position instead of Friedrich Ebert due to his greater popularity. The ministers were the true political decision-makers; Max von Baden was primarily representative to the outside world. Scheidemann, as a member of the government, initiated an amnesty for political prisoners. In particular, he personally pushed through the release of Karl Liebknecht in the face of opposition from the War Ministry and military courts, as well as objections from the Reich chancellor.

== Proclamation of the Republic ==
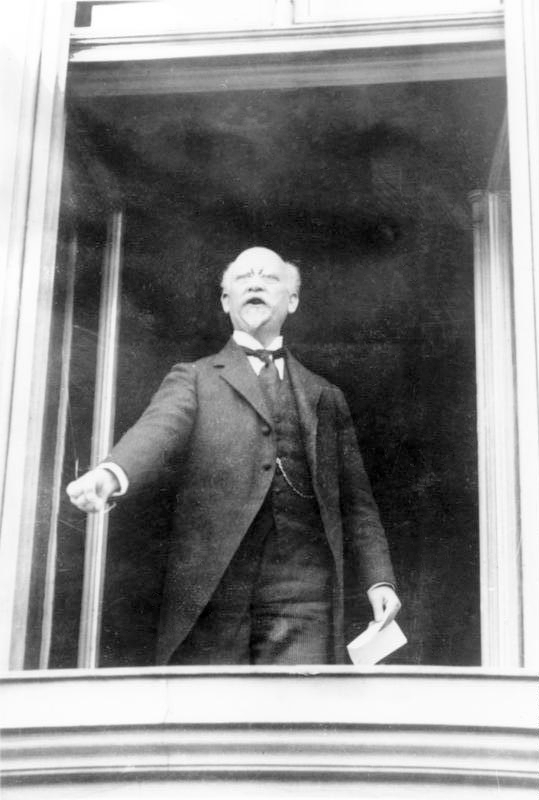
Philipp Scheidemann proclaiming the Republic from the Reichstag building, 9 November 1918

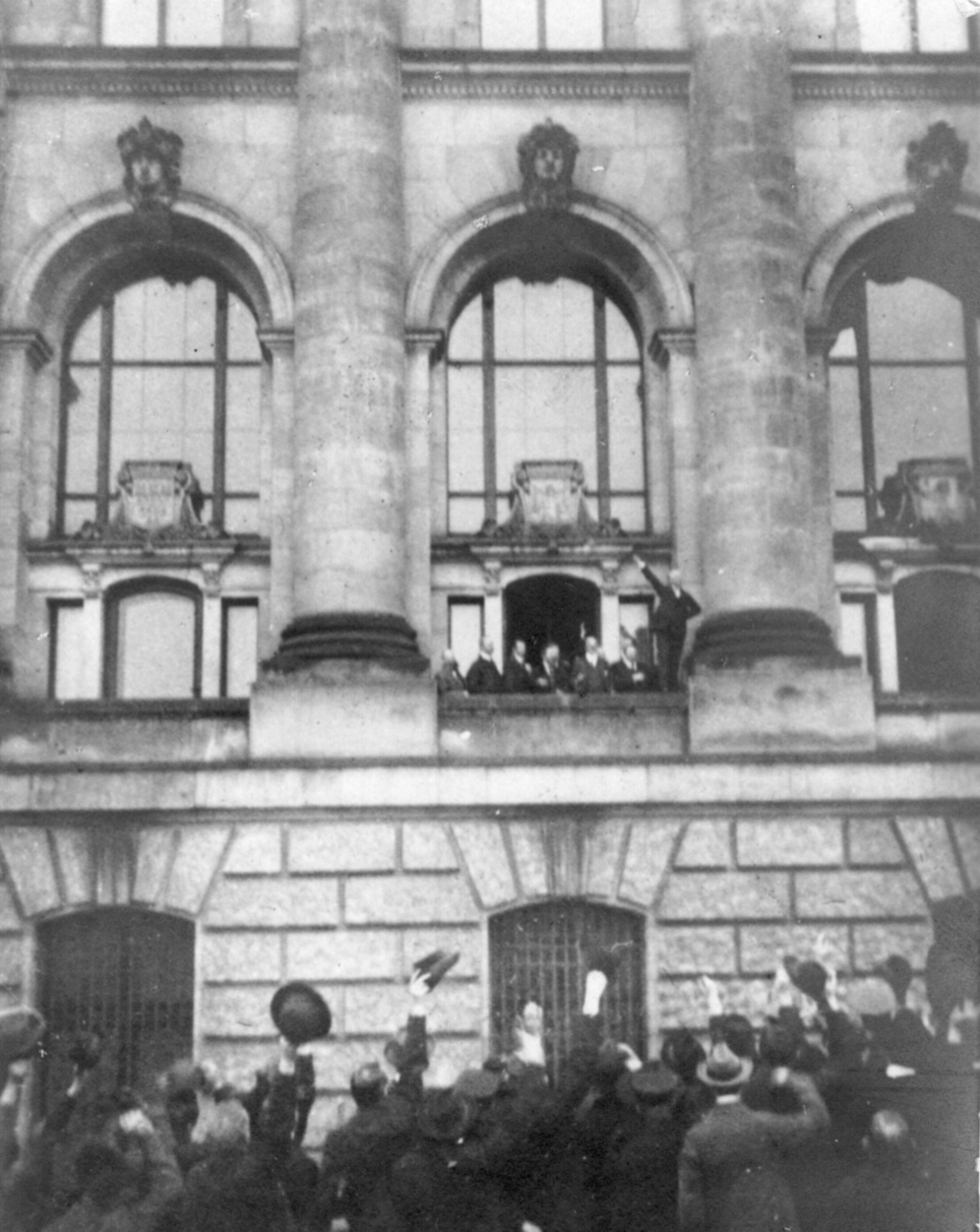
View from a distance of Scheidemann at the Reichstag window

In the face of an impending defeat in the war and the threat of revolutionary developments at home, Scheidemann said on 5 November 1918 that he thought Bolshevism a greater danger than the external enemy. In this, he agreed with the Supreme Army Command. Communist propaganda and historiography later attributed the Reich government's severance of relations with Soviet Russia on that day to Scheidemann and declared him "the author of the anti-Soviet provocation directed against the Spartacus League".

Unlike the military, Scheidemann had come to the conclusion that a successful fight against the extreme left was possible only if Emperor Wilhelm II abdicated. Ebert and Scheidemann nevertheless postponed the fundamental question of monarchy or republic for the time being. Scheidemann had formulated the party's course on 6 November: "Now we must put ourselves at the head of the movement or there will be anarchistic conditions in the Reich." By use of an ultimatum, the MSPD parliamentary group was able, among other things, to push through the parliamentarization of Prussia, Germany's largest state, without being able to stop the outbreak of revolutionary actions in Berlin.

On 9 November 1918, Chancellor Max von Baden unilaterally announced the abdication of Emperor Wilhelm II and the renunciation of Crown Prince Wilhelm's hereditary rights to the throne. Scheidemann handed in his resignation as secretary at 10 a.m. Around noon, Friedrich Ebert arrived at the Reich Chancellery and demanded that the authority to govern be handed over to him and the MSPD. Von Baden resigned and, in an unconstitutional act, designated Ebert his successor as Reich chancellor and minister president of Prussia. When Ebert and Scheidemann went to the Reichstag building for lunch, they sat at separate tables. A huge crowd had gathered outside, and there were calls for a speech. Ebert refused to go out to them, but Scheidemann stood up and hurried to a window facing the crowd. According to Scheidemann's own recollection, someone told him along the way that the Spartacist leader Karl Liebknecht intended to declare Germany a soviet republic. Scheidemann then made a spontaneous speech that closed with the words:

"The old and rotten, the monarchy, has collapsed. Long live the new! Long live the German Republic!"

When Scheidemann returned to the Reichstag dining room, a furious Ebert confronted him. Ebert pounded the table with his fist and shouted, "You have no right to proclaim the republic! What becomes of Germany, a republic or any other form, that is for a constituent assembly to decide!" For Scheidemann, however, it was clear that the legitimisation of the new leadership by Max von Baden's declaration alone would not be sufficient. The demonstrating workers and soldiers expected a complete break with the imperial system.

At that point, Wilhelm II had not abdicated, although he soon fled to the Netherlands and signed an abdication on 28 November 1918. As of 9 November 1918, Germany was legally still a monarchy, which meant that Scheidemann's speech had been without legal authority. Later that day, in spite of Scheidemann's announcement, Ebert asked Prince Maximilian to stay on as imperial regent, but he refused. Both Ebert and Scheidemann still hoped to preserve the existing structure of government under a Chancellor Ebert, to restore calm and to deal with the pressing issue of the armistice with the Allied powers. Yet the revolution seemed likely to force the MSPD to share power with the far left Spartacists and USPD. In the afternoon of 9 November, Ebert grudgingly asked the USPD to nominate three ministers for a future government.

That evening, a group of several hundred followers of the Revolutionary Stewards – workers' representatives who were independent of the formal unions – occupied the Reichstag and held an impromptu debate. They called for the election of soldiers' and workers' councils the next day with an eye to naming a provisional government to be called the Council of the People's Deputies. The MSPD leadership managed to ensure that most of the members elected to the workers' councils came from their ranks and so were able to provide three of the six members of the Council that was set up on 10 November: Ebert, Scheidemann and Otto Landsberg. Ebert became joint chairman with Hugo Haase of the USPD, which provided the other three members (Haase, Wilhelm Dittmann and Emil Barth). Scheidemann was on the Council of the People's Deputies for the entire period of its existence, from 10 November 1918 to 13 February 1919. He was responsible primarily for financial policy.

== Reich Minister President ==
Arms of Germany at the beginning of the Weimar Republic

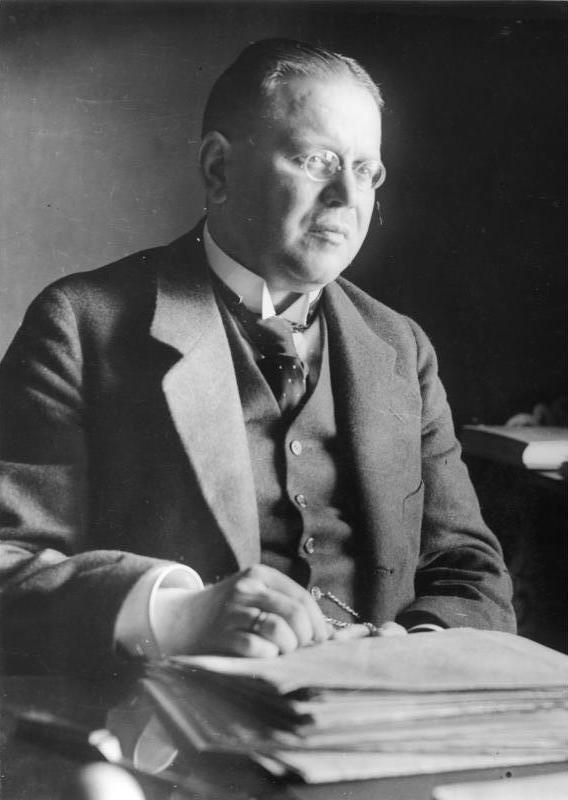
Matthias Erzberger

During the fighting in Berlin in late December 1918, known as the Christmas crisis, Scheidemann backed Ebert's decision to use military force against the occupation of the Palace by the leftist People's Marine Division. That drew the fury of left-wing radicals. Signs carried at the funeral of those killed read "Of the murder of the sailors we accuse Ebert, Landsberg and Scheidemann".

Scheidemann was elected a member of the Weimar National Assembly in the January 1919 federal election. He wanted to persuade Ebert, who was seeking the office of Reich president, to take over the office of Reich chancellor, as he was convinced that Ebert's strengths lay in practical rather than representative activity. He therefore ran against Ebert in the presidential election in February 1919 but received only one of 379 valid votes cast by members of the National Assembly. Ebert, who received 73% of the votes, then entrusted Scheidemann with the formation of the government, which took place on 13 February 1919. Scheidemann held office from then until 20 June 1919 as Reich Minister President, the designation for the head of government until the adoption of the Weimar Constitution and equivalent to Reich chancellor.

Scheidemann headed a cabinet consisting of the MSPD, the Christian democratic Centre Party and the center-left German Democratic Party (DDP) – a combination that came to be known as the Weimar Coalition. Historians attribute the relatively conflict-free work of the coalition government to Scheidemann's role as a moderator rather than as a true leader in the administration of his office. Such assessments are sometimes interpreted as signs of weak leadership and a lack of assertiveness. Gustav Noske, who participated in the government as minister of military affairs, described the government's actions as an expression of the democratic sentiments of the Social Democrats' leaders, to whom "the idea of forcing those who think differently seemed criminal". Out of respect for the election results (the MSPD had 38% of the vote, the Centre 20%, the DDP 19%), the MSPD "never acted in a forcible manner" toward their bourgeois colleagues in the coalition government.

The most difficult domestic challenge for the cabinet was the strikes in the first months of 1919, which were primarily concerned with raising real wages that had fallen as a result of inflation. In the Ruhr region in particular, the strikes were combined with demands for the nationalization of mines. Since coal mining was a key factor in the economy as a whole, Scheidemann's government responded in part by deploying Freikorps units but also by negotiating. In response to a general strike in central Germany in February 1919 involving three-quarters of all workers, Scheidemann had the Reichswehr (German army) occupy the city of Halle, but at the same time, he announced steps to democratize the economy.

The unrest that Scheidemann's government faced in Berlin was quite different. There, the movement, which in the end came to be communist-led, was not concerned with economic goals but political ones. They included recognition of the workers' and soldiers' councils, implementation of the resolutions of the Reich Congress of Workers' and Soldiers' Councils (Reichsrätekongress) on military policy, and resumption of political and economic relations with the Soviet Union. The government used military force against the movement in the Berlin March battles. Mass strikes also occurred in Upper Silesia, Württemberg, and Magdeburg.

Scheidemann's government adopted a law in the National Assembly on 6 March 1919 that, in the words of one historian, "greatly modified and liberalised the code of military justice", bringing it into the realm of social policy. In February 1919, as a concession to the mass movement in the Ruhr, labor minister Gustav Bauer decreed setting up workers' councils for the mining industry, thus beginning a political struggle for representation of workers' councils on boards of directors. On 18 March 1919, a regulation issued by the Demobilization Office introduced the eight-hour working day for office employees, while a government declaration from the same month accepted workers' committees "as official representatives of the economy".

In foreign policy, the decision on whether to accept or reject the Treaty of Versailles fell during Scheidemann's term of office. He had spoken out clearly against signing it. When the Weimar National Assembly met in Berlin for the first time on 12 May 1919, he said, "What hand should not wither that puts this fetter on itself and on us?" At first the majority not only of the population but also in political circles seemed to be behind the rejection, and Scheidemann's remark became a popular saying. Political realists such as Matthias Erzberger of the Centre Party, Gustav Noske, and Eduard David, however, believed that as unacceptable as the treaty may have been, Germany was not in a position to reject it. They drew attention to the fact that a rejection would threaten the occupation of all of Germany by the Allies. The still-existing Supreme Army Command concluded it was not in a position to mount even minimal resistance if the war resumed, and convinced Reich President Ebert to accept the treaty. In addition, the majority of the SPD parliamentary group favored acceptance. Since no agreement could be reached between the governmental parties and no unified position in the cabinet could be reached – several ministers, like Scheidemann, were clearly against the acceptance of the treaty – Scheidemann saw no possibility except resigning.

== Political life after 1919 ==
In the elections of 6 June 1920, Scheidemann was re-elected to the Reichstag, this time for Hesse-Nassau. From 1920 to 1925, he was also mayor of Kassel. He remained a member of the Reichstag until 1933. For many years, he was also a member of the SPD parliamentary party executive. He made frequent appearances outside of parliament, especially after leaving his post as mayor of Kassel in 1925. In 1921, as one of the keynote speakers at the MSPD's Görlitz Party Congress, he called on his party to declare safeguarding the Republic its foremost concern: "We will not be surpassed by anyone in love for our fatherland and for our people." Later, he became one of the most sought-after speakers at events of the SPD-affiliated Reichsbanner Schwarz-Rot-Gold (Reich Banner Black, Red, Gold), to whose Reich committee he belonged.

After leaving the government, Scheidemann increasingly became the spokesman for those in his party who were dissatisfied with the actions of its representatives and government officials. He became one of the most outspoken advocates of the resolution adopted in 1919 at the Weimar Party Congress of the MSPD, which emphasized the party's unrestricted independence with respect to the government and the government representatives it appointed. Based on it, Scheidemann took the position that, in cases of tension between government action on the one hand and the party's political line and basic direction on the other, the latter should be given preference. He thought that loyalty to one's own government representatives had its limits where fundamental principles of the party and elementary interests of the people were violated.

In November 1923, Scheidemann admitted in a newspaper article in the Casseler Volksblatt that the course he had followed a year earlier, which had led to the end of Joseph Wirth's (Centre Party) second government, had been a grave and irreparable mistake. At that time, in deference to the former USPD members who had just returned to the mother party, they had refused any cooperation with the right-liberal German People's Party (DVP), which had ultimately brought the non-partisan Wilhelm Cuno, who was close to the DVP, into the government as Reich chancellor.

In April 1921, Scheidemann called on Reich President Friedrich Ebert to resign because his office compelled him to use his Social Democratic name in support of the center-right minority government formed after the MSPD withdrew following its loss of 62 seats in the 1920 election. Scheidemann's call had been preceded by many expressions of displeasure from within the party against Ebert because he had not resisted the request of Centre Party Chancellor Constantin Fehrenbach's center-right government to invoke Emergency Article 48 of the Reich Constitution. It had allowed the government to bypass parliament and impose restrictions on the right to strike (November 1920) and to introduce special courts to suppress the communist-led March Action uprising (1921) in central Germany. Scheidemann's call had been immediately preceded by the adoption, approved by Ebert, of the flag ordinance introduced by the Fehrenbach government. It used symbols of the empire to a far greater extent than had originally been provided for in the constitution and could therefore be understood as a signal directed against the Republic. Ebert did not heed Scheidemann's request to resign.

During his tenure in the Reichstag, Scheidemann wrote political treatises that were widely read and in parliament made several speeches that had significant consequences. After the Kapp Putsch in 1920, he sharply attacked his party colleague Gustav Noske in the National Assembly, which had fled to Stuttgart due to the putsch, although he did not explicitly mention his name. Scheidemann held the Reichswehr minister partly responsible for the coup attempt, saying that the democratization of the military had been neglected. He demanded a thorough purge of the troops, the disarmament of all mutineers, and the dismissal of all officers who were not loyal to the republic. Noske was eventually forced to resign.

In 1926, Scheidemann revealed in the Reichstag the illegal collaboration between the Reichswehr and the Soviet Army in an attempt to rebuild the German armed forces beyond the limitations of the Versailles Treaty. The revelation led to the fall of the third government of Wilhelm Marx (Centre Party).

== Mayor of Kassel ==
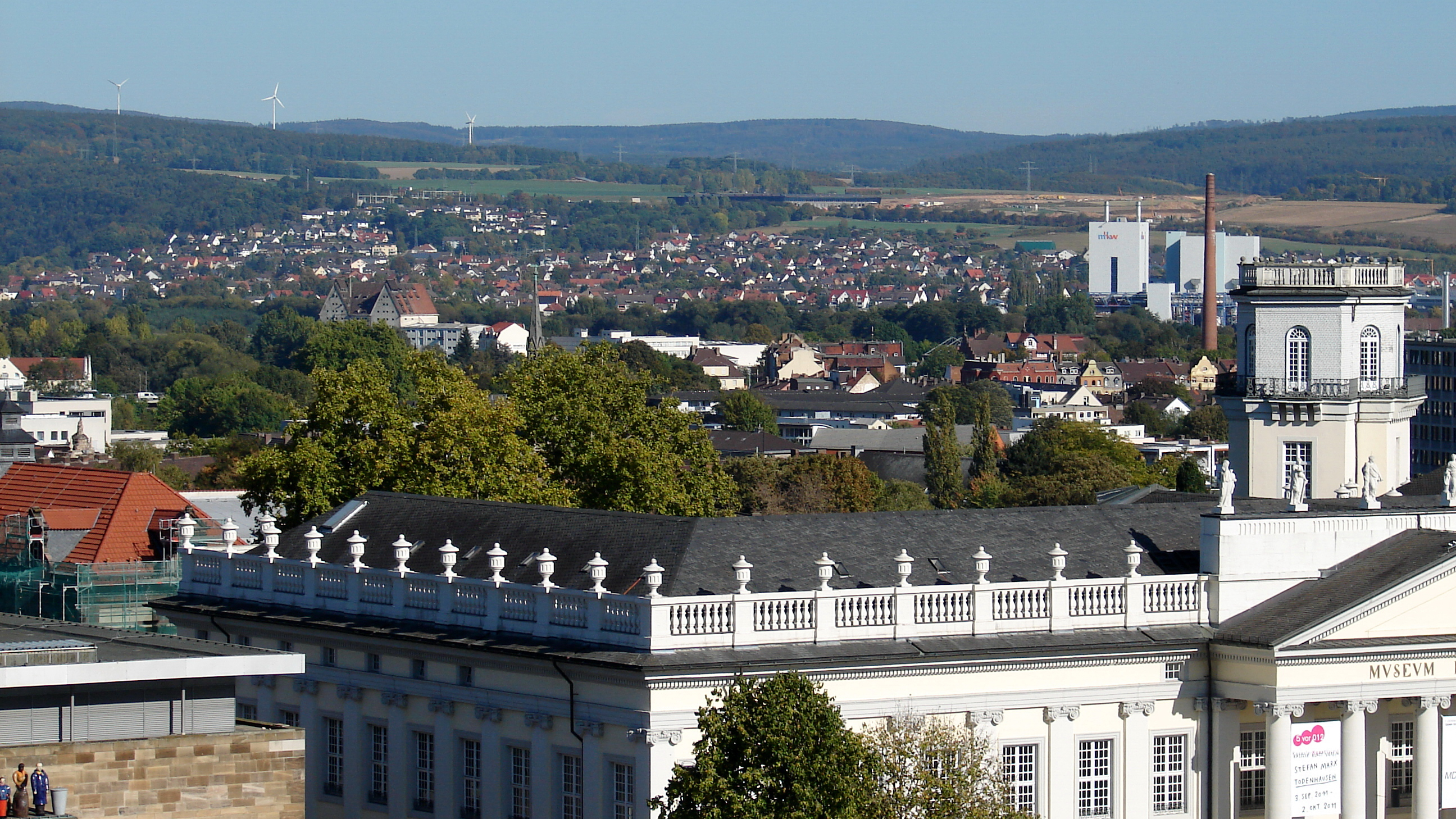
View of modern-day Kassel

Scheidemann was elected Mayor of Kassel on 19 December 1919, succeeding Erich Koch-Weser. He held office until 1925. From the beginning of his term, he had to defend himself against accusations from the bourgeois parties in Kassel, who said that a craftsman's son did not have the qualifications for the office and accused him of neglecting his tasks in Kassel because of his Reichstag mandate. Similar criticism eventually came from the SPD. In Kassel's municipal elections on 4 May 1924, the SPD suffered a serious defeat, which gave the bourgeois parties a majority in the city parliament. A motion of no confidence against Scheidemann passed, but it was not legally binding. The conflict continued until the district president finally intervened. As a result of his mediation, Scheidemann left office on 1 October 1925. After that, he concentrated on his Reichstag duties. He also wrote a number of books, including his autobiography in two volumes, Memoirs of a Social Democrat (1928).

== Scheidemann as embodiment of the enemy to the Republic's opponents ==
Scheidemann was an embodiment of the "Weimar system" for both the extreme right and left. Taking advantage of the ambiguity of his surname, the term "Scheidemann" was used as an invective against supporters of the Republic ("Scheide" can mean either "scabbard" or "vagina"). After such usage had become common among militaristic-nationalist circles during World War I, the Spartacus League used it with an appeal to the workers and soldiers of Berlin on 10 November 1918, when socialists in the government were defamed as "Scheidemänner" ("Scheide men") who had "hounded" the working class into war.

On Whit Sunday, 4 June 1922, while Scheidemann was mayor of Kassel, an attempt was made on his life. During a walk with his daughter, Hans Hustert (who would later be an SS adjutant to Heinrich Himmler) and Karl Oehlschläger sprayed him in the face with prussic acid. The third man who took part in the assassination attempt is said to have been Erwin Kern, one of the men who murdered Foreign Minister Walther Rathenau three weeks later. Scheidemann survived the assassination attempt because strong winds prevented the perpetrators from spraying him, so that the poison entered his mouth and nose. Later, after Scheidemann received repeated death threats and his house was smeared with swastikas, he always carried a pistol on walks to defend himself against attackers. The assassination attempt against him was part of a series of political murders that included, among others, Matthias Erzberger, one of the signers of the Armistice of 11 November 1918, and Walther Rathenau. The perpetrators were members of the Organisation Consul (the group mainly responsible for the murder series), the Deutschvölkischer Schutz- und Trutzbund (German Nationalist Federation for Protection and Defense), the Freikorps Ehrhardt Brigade, and the Iron Division. The men who attacked Scheidemann were caught the same year and sentenced to long prison terms.

== Life in exile ==
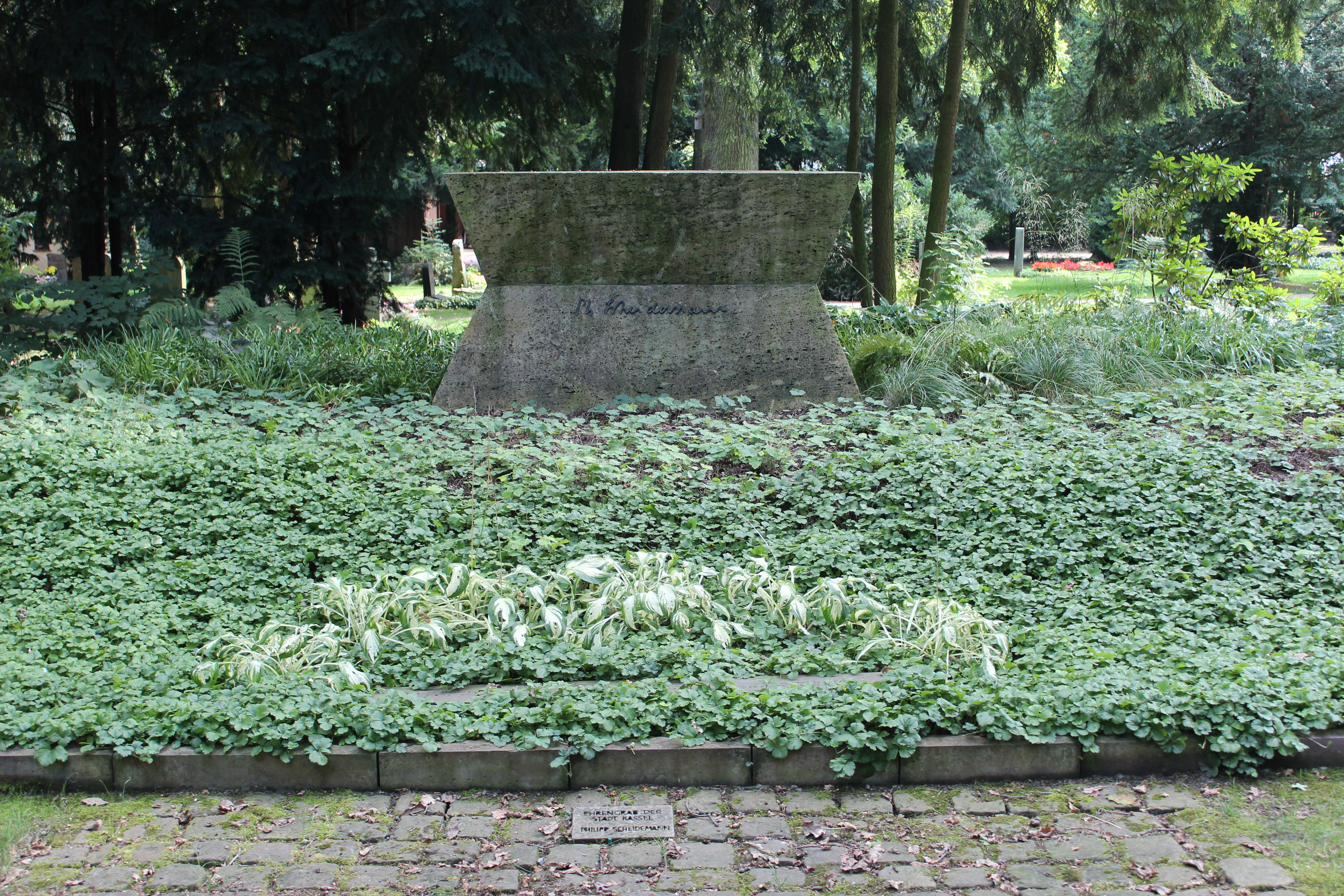
Philipp Scheidemann's grave

After the Nazis seized power on 30 January 1933, Scheidemann, whom the far right had for years denounced as a leading November criminal, realized he was in grave danger. A few days after the Reichstag fire on 27 February 1933, he was one of several SPD members who went into exile. He fled to Salzburg, Austria, where Austrian National Council member Josef Witternigg took him in. Scheidemann's extensive records of his political activity, including 26 volumes of diary notes from 1914 to 1919, remained behind in Germany, where they were confiscated by the political police. They are now considered to have been lost.

After stays in Czechoslovakia, Switzerland, France and the United States, Scheidemann arrived in Denmark in 1935. The German Reich's first expatriation list, published on 25 August 1933, deprived him of his German citizenship. Although his health was deteriorating, he observed the developments in Germany closely and published articles in the Danish working-class press under a pseudonym.

Philipp Scheidemann died in Copenhagen on 29 November 1939. In 1953, the city of Copenhagen had his ashes transferred to Kassel. His grave is located in the old section of Kassel's main cemetery and is preserved as a grave of honor by the city. Scheidemann's own wish had been to be buried in Berlin alongside his wife Johanna, who died in August 1926.

== Writings in exile ==
In the last years of his life, Scheidemann produced a number of manuscripts in which he attempted to critically examine various aspects of Social Democratic politics between 1918 and 1933. In 1940, after the German occupation of Denmark, Scheidemann's daughter Louise buried the papers near Copenhagen. She was able to recover them in 1945 and in 1947, gave the SPD executive committee some copies for inspection. In February 1948, the deputy party chairman Erich Ollenhauer advised her in writing that it was, for the time being, not "in the interest of the party" to publish the material "in which your father is in part very critical of the official policy of the party in the Weimar Republic." Publication did not take place until 2002.

In his writings, Scheidemann accused Friedrich Ebert in particular of having "ruined" the SPD through serious political missteps. He described Ebert as a calculating lone wolf who hardly ever explained himself, who was a "master in organizational and tactical issues," and who usually avoided direct confrontation and discussion in the official committees but always understood how to get his way through parallel informal consultations with different interest groups. Such maneuvering had enabled Ebert, for example, to secure the Reich presidency in February 1919, even though the majority of the SPD parliamentary group had initially wanted to nominate Scheidemann after word got out that Ebert had reacted to Scheidemann's proclamation of the Republic on 9 November 1918 with an outburst of rage. Scheidemann stated that he soon "bitterly regretted" his withdrawal from the party leadership in the fall of 1919 and his departure for Kassel. The "struggle against the policies led by Ebert would have had to be fought out then, by hook or by crook, because the impending disaster was already palpable." Scheidemann was similarly harsh in his judgment of the behavior of the leading groups of the SPD and the General German Trade Union Federation in the summer of 1932 and spring of 1933, saying that the attitude of the trade union leaders in particular was "appallingly pathetic" and that their attempts to "find a modus vivendi with Hitler" were "unparalleled in the history of the international labor movement". Scheidemann demanded of the SPD executive committee in exile that self-criticism not be limited to the years 1918 and 1919; what was required was "at least a few lines about the fifteen years that lie behind us, but at a minimum about 20 July 1932" – the date of 1932 Prussian coup d'état, when Reich President Paul von Hindenburg invoked an emergency clause of the Weimar constitution to replace the elected government of the state of Prussia with Franz von Papen as Reich Commissioner. Scheidemann himself, like many other Social Democrats, had counted on the call for a general strike in July 1932 and February 1933, partly because "influential comrades" had repeatedly assured him that "the button would be pressed" at the decisive moment. He had "believed in the Berlin slogan because I considered a complete failure of the leadership, in which, admittedly, I had not had great confidence for years, to be impossible".

== Works ==
- Es lebe der Frieden [Long Live Peace], 1916;
- Der Zusammenbruch [The Collapse], 1921;
- Der Fürsten Habgier, Die Forderungen der Fürsten an das Notleidende Volk [The Greed of the Princes, The Demands of the Princes on the Needy People], 1926;
- Die Sozialdemokratie und das stehende Heer [Social Democracy and the Standing Army]. 1910;
- Der Feind steht rechts! [The Enemy is on the Right!] 1919;
- Memoiren eines Sozialdemokraten. [Memoirs of a Social Democrat] 2 vols., 1928. (new edition 2010, Severus-Verlag, Hamburg, ISBN 978-3-942382-37-3 und ISBN 978-3-942382-54-0);
- Das historische Versagen der SPD. Schriften aus dem Exil. [The Historical Failure of the SPD. Writings from Exile] Frank R. Reitzle, ed.. zu Klampen: Lüneburg 2002;
- Kasseläner Jungen – Mundartliche Geschichderchen. [Kassel Youth—Stories in Dialect] (Pseudonym Henner Piffendeckel) Facsimile of the 1926 edition. Comino-Verlag, Berlin, ISBN 978-3-945831-06-9.

== Literature ==
- Braun, Bernd: Die Weimarer Reichskanzler. Zwölf Lebensläufe in Bildern [The Weimar Chancellors. Twelve Biographies in Pictures]. Droste, Düsseldorf 2011, ISBN 978-3-7700-5308-7.
- Gellinek, Christian: Philipp Scheidemann. Gedächtnis und Erinnerung [Philipp Scheidemann. Memory and Recollection]. Waxmann, Münster/New York/München/Berlin 2006, ISBN 978-3-8309-1695-6.
- "Philipp Scheidemann". In: Franz Osterroth: Biographisches Lexikon des Sozialismus. Verstorbene Persönlichkeiten [Biographical Dictionary of Socialism. Deceased Figures]. Volume 1. J. H. W. Dietz Nachf., Hannover 1960, pp. 262–263.
- Mühlhausen, Walter: "Das große Ganze im Auge behalten". Philipp Scheidemann Oberbürgermeister von Kassel (1920–1925) ["Keeping an eye on the big picture". Philipp Scheidemann Mayor of Kassel (1920–1925)]. Marburg 2011, ISBN 978-3-942225-11-3.

Political offices
Preceded by Wilhelm Solf	Minister for the Colonies; 13 December 1918 – 13 February 1919	Succeeded by Johannes Bell
Preceded by Friedrich Ebert	Minister President of Germany; 13 February 1919 – 20 June 1919	Succeeded by Gustav Bauer
