= Johannes Bell =

German lawyer and politician (1868–1949)

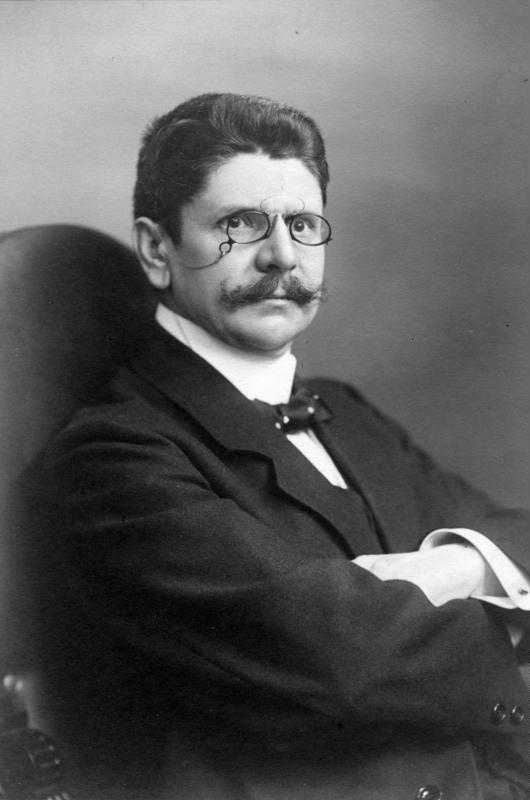
- Johannes Bell in 1908

Reich Minister of Justice
- In office 17 July 1926 – 29 January 1927
- Chancellor: Wilhelm Marx
- Preceded by: Wilhelm Marx (acting)
- Succeeded by: Oskar Hergt

Reich Minister for the Occupied Territories
- Acting; 17 July 1926 – 29 January 1927
- Chancellor: Wilhelm Marx
- Preceded by: Wilhelm Marx (acting)
- Succeeded by: Wilhelm Marx (acting)

Reich Minister of Transport
- In office 5 November 1919 – 1 May 1920
- Chancellor: Gustav Bauer; Hermann Müller
- Preceded by: Position established
- Succeeded by: Gustav Bauer

Reich Minister for the Colonies
- In office 21 June 1919 – 7 November 1919
- Chancellor: Philipp Scheidemann; Gustav Bauer
- Preceded by: Philipp Scheidemann
- Succeeded by: Position abolished

Personal details
- Born: 23 September 1868 Essen, Rhine Province, Kingdom of Prussia, North German Confederation
- Died: 21 October 1949 (aged 81) Beverungen, North Rhine-Westphalia, West Germany
- Party: Centre Party
- Profession: Jurist

Johannes Bell (23 September 1868 – 21 October 1949) was a German jurist and politician from the Centre Party. During the Weimar Republic era, he briefly served as Minister of Colonial Affairs, Minister of Transport (1919/20), and as Minister of Justice (1926/27). He was one of the two German representatives who signed the Treaty of Versailles in June 1919.

== Life ==
Johannes Bell was born on 23 September 1868 in Essen in what was then the Rhine Province of Prussia, as the son of Josef Bell, a land surveyor, and his wife Josefine (née Steuer). A Roman Catholic, Bell married Trude Nünning in 1896.

Bell studied law at Tübingen, Leipzig and Bonn and was awarded a Doctor of Law in 1890.

He started practicing law in Essen in 1894 and in 1900 became a notary. After 1908, Bell was a member of the Prussian diet. From 1911/12 to 1933 (i.e. both in the Empire and in the Weimar Republic), he was a member (and 1920 to 1926 Vice-President) of the Reichstag for the Catholic German Center Party or Zentrum. He was also a member of the constituent assemblies, Weimar National Assembly and its Prussian equivalent, the Preußische Landesversammlung.

Bell was a member of the first democratically elected governments of Germany, the Cabinet Scheidemann, Cabinet Bauer and Cabinet Müller I. In February 1919, Bell became Reichskolonialminister (Minister of Colonial Affairs) and he held that post until the ministry was dissolved in November 1919. Together with Hermann Müller (SPD), Bell signed the Treaty of Versailles for Germany on 28 June 1919. After June 1919, he also was Reichsverkehrsminister (Minister of Transport). In this capacity, Bell was instrumental in the creation of the Deutsche Reichsbahn, which involved the nationalization of various regional railway lines. He remained in office just long enough to see the National Assembly approve the unification of railways and then resigned in May 1920.

Bell was also a senior figure in the parliamentary group of the Zentrum and the author of numerous publications, making him a well-known political figure.

Johannes Bell once again served as a minister of Germany from July 1926 to February 1927 in the cabinet of Wilhelm Marx, as Reichsjustizminister (Minister of Justice) and minister for the occupied territories. After 1930, he was chairman of the Reichstag committee on violations of international law.

After the Nazis seized power in 1933, Bell retired from politics. He died on 21 October 1949 in Würgassen/Weser.

== Selected works ==
- Wiederaufbau der deutschen Handelsflotte, 1917
- Volkswirtschaftliche und mittelständische Fragen für Kriegs- und Übergangszeit, 1918
- Zentrum und Werdegang sowie Reform von Strafrecht und Strafprozeß, 1920
- Volksstaat und Staatsvolk, 1928
- Strafrechtsreform, Gesammelte Aufsätze, 1930

Political offices
Preceded by Philipp Scheidemann	Colonial Minister of Germany; 1919	Succeeded by Position abolished
