= Bernhard Dernburg =

German politician (1865–1937)

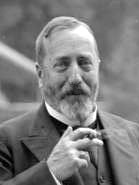
Bernhard Dernburg (July 1931)

Bernhard Dernburg (17 July 1865 – 14 October 1937) was a German liberal politician and banker. He served as the secretary for Colonial Affairs and head of the Imperial Colonial Office from May 1907 to 9 June 1910, and as the minister of Finance and vice-chancellor of Germany from 17 April to 20 June 1919.

== Background and banking career ==
Born in Darmstadt in the Grand Duchy of Hesse, Bernhard Dernburg was the son of publisher and politician Friedrich Dernburg (1833–1911), a member of the National Liberal Party, belonging to a distinguished Jewish family. Friedrich Dernburg had converted to Lutheranism and married Luise Stahl, the daughter of a Lutheran minister. Bernhard Dernburg was a Lutheran. He made a career in banking, including at the Deutsche Bank, and became Director of Deutsche Treuhand-Gesellschaft in 1889. He subsequently joined the management of the Darmstädter Bank. In 1901, he founded the Deutsch-Luxemburgische Bergwerks- und Hütten-AG together with Hugo Stinnes, which became one of the largest companies in its field. He served as a board member of a number of large industrial companies.

== Political career ==
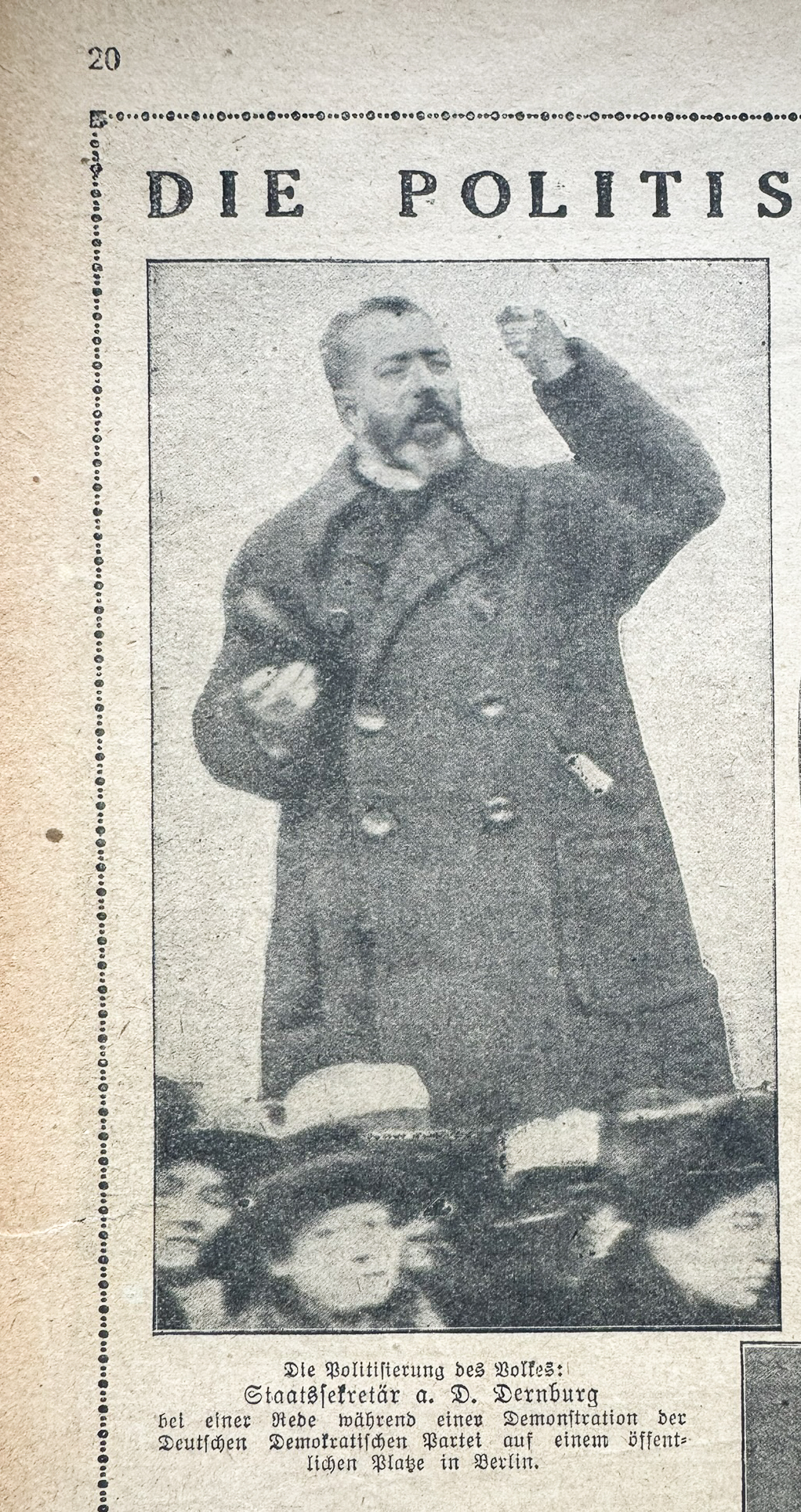
Bernhard Dernburg addressing a street demonstration in 1919

In 1906, Dernburg entered politics as Prussian Representative at the Federal Council. In September 1906 the German Chancellor, Bernhard von Bülow, appointed Dernburg as director of the Colonial Section of the Foreign Office.

Germany's colonial empire was in a parlous state, following major rebellions in German Southwest Africa (now Namibia) and German East Africa (now Tanzania, Rwanda and Burundi). The colonial administration was racked with scandals, and the much-touted economic benefits of colonisation were yet to be seen. It was felt that putting an energetic and successful businessman in charge of the colonies might resolve some of these problems, although the bureaucrats in Berlin and in the colonies took a dim view of Dernburg's qualifications. Colonial matters played a prominent role in the German election of January 1907. Dernburg campaigned for a policy of rational economic development of the colonies, based upon the construction of railways. He was one of the first to realise that the indigenous population of the colonies was a resource which Germany had neglected, and he was fond of stating that "The native is the most valuable asset in our colonies."

Chancellor Bülow was victorious in the election, and in May 1907 he established a separate Colonial Office, appointing Dernburg as first secretary-of-state for the colonies. From July to October 1907 Dernburg undertook a study-tour to East Africa. Here the reforming governor, Albrecht von Rechenberg, organised a carefully choreographed programme which convinced Dernburg that the future of the colony lay in the promotion of African small-holder agriculture, rather than large European-owned plantations. Railway development was another crucial aspect of this programme, to allow produce to be exported from the interior to the coastal ports.

From May to August 1908 Dernburg undertook a tour of German Southwest Africa (now Namibia), where he was more conciliatory in his dealings with the white population than he had been in East Africa. Late in 1909 he went to the United States, to investigate the possibilities of improving cotton production in the German colonies. However Bülow's government had fallen in July 1909, and Dernburg came under increasing attack. He resigned from his post as Colonial Secretary in May 1910, but the policies which he had introduced largely governed the course of German colonial development until the First World War.

During 1914 and 1915, while Germany was at war with Britain but the USA was still neutral, Dernburg was based in the United States and represented German viewpoints in the propaganda campaign against Britain.

Following the First World War, he co-founded the liberal German Democratic Party, served as a member of its national board, and was elected to the Weimar National Assembly. From 17 April to 20 June 1919, he served in the cabinet of Philipp Scheidemann as Federal Minister of Finance and Vice Chancellor.

He was a member of the Reichstag, representing the German Democratic Party, from 1920 to 1930. He died in Berlin on 14 October 1937.

== Publications ==
- Koloniale Finanzprobleme, 1907
- Koloniale Lehrjahre, 1907
- Südwestafrikanische Eindrücke, 1909
- Industrielle Fortschritte in den Kolonien, 1909

Political offices
Preceded by Ernst II, Prince of Hohenlohe-Langenburg	Head of the Colonial Department; 1906–1907	Succeeded by Himself as State Secretary for the Colonies
Preceded by Himself	Secretary for the Colonies; 1907–1910	Succeeded by Friedrich von Lindequist
Preceded by Eugen Schiffer	Deputy Minister President of Germany; 1919	Succeeded by Matthias Erzberger
Preceded by Eugen Schiffer	Minister of Finance; 1919	Succeeded by Matthias Erzberger
