= List of German colonial ministers =

State Secretary for the Imperial Colonial Office
- Staatssekretär des Reichskolonialamtes
- Service flag of the Colonial Office

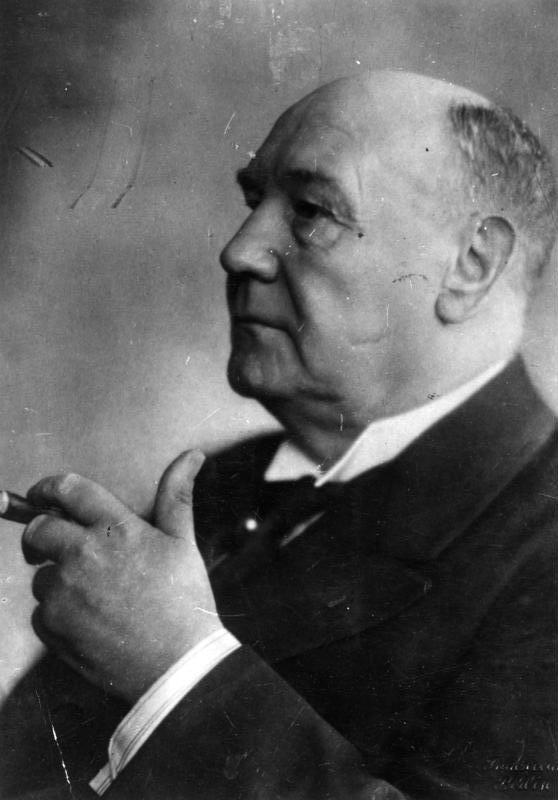
- Longest serving Wilhelm Solf (20 December 1911 – 13 December 1918)
- Imperial Colonial Office
- Status: Abolished
- Member of: The Cabinet
- Reports to: The Chancellor
- Formation: 1 April 1890
- First holder: Friedrich Richard Krauel
- Final holder: Johannes Bell
- Abolished: 20 June 1919

This page lists colonial ministers of Imperial Germany. With the loss of Germany's colonies in the Treaty of Versailles in 1919, the office was abolished.

== Directors of the Colonial Department in the Foreign Secretariat (1890–1907) ==
No.	Picture	Director of the Colonial Department	Took office	Left office	Time in office
1	Friedrich Richard Krauel [de]	Friedrich Richard Krauel (1848–1918)	1 April 1890	30 June 1890	90 days
2	Paul Kayser [de]	Paul Kayser (1845–1898)	30 June 1890	15 October 1896	6 years, 107 days
3	Oswald von Richthofen	Oswald von Richthofen (1847–1906)	15 October 1896	31 March 1898	1 year, 167 days
4	Gerhard von Buchka [de]	Gerhard von Buchka (1851–1936)	1 April 1898	12 June 1900	2 years, 72 days
5	Oscar Wilhelm Stübel [de]	Oscar Wilhelm Stübel (1846–1921)	12 June 1900	18 July 1905	5 years, 36 days
6	Ernst II of Hohenlohe-Langenburg	Prince; Ernst II of Hohenlohe-Langenburg (1863–1950)	18 July 1905	17 May 1907	1 year, 303 days

== State Secretaries for the Colonies (1907–1918) ==
No.	Picture	State Secretary for the Colonies	Took office	Left office	Time in office
1	Bernhard Dernburg	Bernhard Dernburg (1865–1937)	17 May 1907	9 June 1910	3 years, 23 days
2	Friedrich von Lindequist	Friedrich von Lindequist (1862–1945)	10 June 1910	3 November 1911	1 year, 146 days
3	Wilhelm Solf	Wilhelm Solf (1862–1936)	20 December 1911	13 December 1918	6 years, 358 days

== Ministers for the Colonies (1918–1919) ==
No.	Picture	Ministers for the Colonies	Took office	Left office	Time in office	Party
1	Philipp Scheidemann	Philipp Scheidemann (1865–1939)	13 December 1918	13 February 1919	62 days	SPD
2	Johannes Bell	Johannes Bell (1868–1949)	13 February 1919	20 June 1919	157 days	Centre

== See also ==
- Imperial Colonial Office
- NSDAP Office of Colonial Policy
- Reichskolonialbund
