= Eduard David =

German politician

Minister of the Interior
- In office 21 June 1919 – 4 October 1919
- Chancellor: Gustav Bauer
- Preceded by: Hugo Preuss
- Succeeded by: Erich Koch-Weser

President of the Weimar National Assembly
- In office 7 February 1919 – 13 February 1919
- President: Friedrich Ebert
- Chancellor: Philipp Scheidemann
- Preceded by: Constantin Fehrenbach (as President of the Reichstag)
- Succeeded by: Conrad Haußmann (acting); Constantin Fehrenbach

Member of the Reichstag
- In office 1903–1918
- Constituency: Hessen 9

Personal details
- Born: 11 June 1863 Ediger-Eller
- Died: 24 December 1930 (aged 67) Berlin
- Party: Social Democratic Party of Germany

Eduard Heinrich Rudolph David (11 June 1863 – 24 December 1930) was a German politician. He was an important figure in the history of the Social Democratic Party of Germany (SPD) and of the German political labour movement. After the German Revolution of 1918–1919, he was a Minister without portfolio in the government of Philipp Scheidemann, before becoming Minister of the Interior in June 1919 in the succeeding government headed by Gustav Bauer. David remained in that position until October of that year.

David was also briefly the first president of the Weimar National Assembly, which drew up the Weimar Constitution and ratified the Treaty of Versailles in 1919.

== Biography ==
=== Early life ===
Eduard David was born on 11 June 1863 in Ediger/Mosel as the son of Johann Heinrich David, a Prussian civil servant, and his wife Wilhelmine Elisabeth (née Werner).

After completing a four-year commercial apprenticeship (kaufmännische Lehre), David studied at the university at Giessen, where he was introduced to socialist ideals. He worked as a teacher at a gymnasium and established a newspaper, the Mitteldeutsche Sonntagszeitung, in 1893. David's support for the Social Democratic Party of Germany (SPD) led to his dismissal from the civil service in 1894.

David was married twice. In 1896, he married Gertrud Swiderski (one daughter) and in 1911, Hermine Schmidt (one son).

=== Political career ===
In the 1890s, David became a proponent of agricultural policies favouring small holdings, arguing for their viability in a series of articles in the Sozialdemokrat in August and September 1894. David argued against the traditional Marxist idea that small landholdings would increasingly be replaced by large estates, marking David as among the first Revisionists in his party.

This journalism on the agrarian question would later be expanded into his major book-length work, Sozialismus und Landwirtschaft (Socialism and Agriculture), in 1903.

From 1896, David was a member of the Landtag of Hesse and after 1903 a member of the Reichstag for the SPD. He was one of the leading politicians of the "Majority" SPD when the party split during the First World War and was instrumental in framing his party's policy stand on the war.

=== Government ministry ===
In October 1918, when the SPD became part of the Imperial government for the first time under the new chancellor Max von Baden, David became Under Secretary at the Foreign Office.

The grave of Eduard David and his wife Hermine at the Hauptfriedhof in Mainz, Germany.

In February 1919, David was elected president of the new National Assembly, but as part of a deal establishing the first democratically elected government, the Scheidemann cabinet, he relinquished that post in favour of Constantin Fehrenbach (Centre Party) and became Minister without Portfolio under the new Ministerpräsident, Philipp Scheidemann (SPD).

After Scheidemann's cabinet resigned in June 1919 in protest over the stipulations of the Treaty of Versailles, a new government was formed by Gustav Bauer (SPD) and David became Reichsminister des Innern (Minister of the Interior), a position he held from 21 June to 4 October 1919. In early October, the German Democratic Party (DDP), which had left the coalition government in June, rejoined, thus reestablishing the Weimar Coalition of SPD, DDP and Centre Party. Erich Koch-Weser (DDP) took over as Minister of the Interior and David once again was Minister without Portfolio. He retained this position in the first cabinet of Hermann Müller, who formed the new government when the Cabinet Bauer resigned in March 1920.

=== Later activities ===
In 1922, David was appointed Reichsbevollmächtigter in Hesse and from 1923 to 1927, he taught political sciences at what was then the Technische Hochschule Darmstadt.

=== Death and legacy ===
Eduard David died in Berlin on 24 December 1930. David is today considered a key figure in the history of the political labour movement in Germany, as he influenced the development of the SPD in the pre-World War I period as one of the leading advocates of reformist policies.

== Works ==
- Zweck und Mittel einer einheitlichen Organisation der deutschen Studentenschaft, 1888
- Sozialismus und Landwirtschaft, 1903
- Referentenführer, 1907
- Darwinismus und soziale Entwicklung, 1909
- Sozialdemokratie und Vaterlandsverteidigung, 1915
- Die Sozialdemokratie im Weltkrieg, 1915
- Wer trägt die Schuld am Krieg? 1917
- Die Siedlungsgesetzgebung, 1921
- Um die Fahne der Deutschen Republik, 1921
- Die Befriedung Europas, 1926
- Aus Deutschlands schwerster Zeit, Schriften und Reden aus den Jahren 1914–1919, 1927.
