= Chief of the Reich Chancellery =

List of people serving as chief of the Reich Chancellery

- Chef der Reichskanzlei (German)
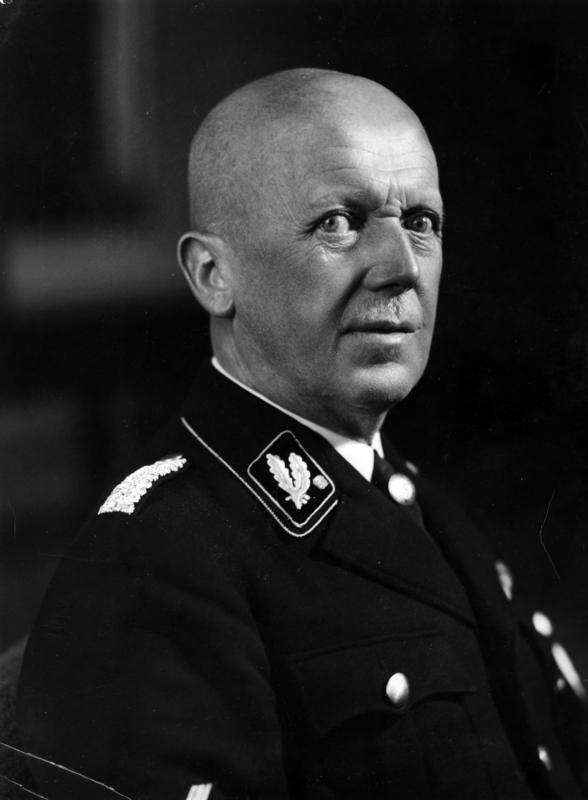
- Longest serving Hans Lammers; 30 January 1933–24 April 1945
- Reich Chancellery
- Type: State Secretary (until 1937), Reich Minister (from 1937)
- Status: Abolished
- Reports to: Chancellor
- Formation: 1878
- First holder: Christoph von Tiedemann
- Final holder: Hans Lammers
- Abolished: 1945
- Superseded by: Chief of the Federal Chancellery

The Chief of the Reich Chancellery (German: Chef der Reichskanzlei) was the highest-ranking official of the Reich Chancellery and the principal assistant of the Chancellor of Germany.

== List of officeholders ==
No.	Portrait	Name (born–died)	Term of office			Political party	Cabinet	Ref.
No.	Portrait	Name (born–died)	Took office	Left office	Time in office	Political party	Cabinet	Ref.
1		Christoph von Tiedemann (1836–1907)	21 March 1871	20 September 1881	10 years, 183 days	German Reich Party	Bismarck	
2		Franz Johannes von Rottenburg (1845–1907)	14 October 1881	19 January 1891	9 years, 97 days	Independent	Bismarck; Caprivi	
3		Karl Göring (1829–1905)	1 February 1891	31 December 1894	3 years, 333 days	Independent	Caprivi; Hohenlohe-Schillingsfürst	
4		Kurt von Wilmowsky (1850–1941)	1 January 1895	15 August 1901	6 years, 226 days	Independent	Hohenlohe-Schillingsfürst; Bülow	
5		Alfred von Conrad (1852–1914)	14 August 1901	18 September 1904	3 years, 35 days	Independent	Bülow	
6		Friedrich Wilhelm von Loebell (1855–1931)	25 September 1904	14 July 1909	4 years, 292 days	German Conservative Party	Bülow	
7		Arnold Wahnschaffe (1865–1941)	20 November 1909	11 August 1917	7 years, 264 days	Independent	Bethmann Hollweg; Michaelis	
8		Hans Joachim von Graevenitz (1874–1938)	11 August 1917	9 November 1917	90 days	Independent	Michaelis	
9		Wilhelm von Radowitz (1875–1939)	20 November 1917	17 October 1918	331 days	Independent	Hertling	
(7)		Arnold Wahnschaffe (1865–1941)	18 October 1918	9 November 1918	22 days	Independent	Baden	
10		Curt Baake (1864–1940)	13 February 1919	3 March 1919	18 days	Social Democratic Party of Germany	Scheidemann	
11		Heinrich Albert (1874–1960)	3 March 1919	24 May 1921	2 years, 82 days	Independent	Scheidemann; Bauer; Müller I Fehrenbach; Wirth I	
–		Arnold Brecht (1884–1977) acting	24 May 1921	3 August 1921	71 days	Independent	Wirth I	
12		Heinrich Hemmer (1886–1942)	3 August 1921	22 November 1922	1 year, 111 days	Independent	Wirth I–II	
13		Eduard Hamm (1881–1944)	22 November 1922	12 August 1923	263 days	German Democratic Party	Cuno	
14		Werner von Rheinbaben (1878–1975)	13 August 1923	17 October 1923	65 days	German People's Party	Stresemann I–II	
15		Adolf Kempkes (1871–1931)	17 October 1923	23 November 1923	37 days	German People's Party	Stresemann II	
16		Franz Bracht (1877–1933)	30 November 1923	18 December 1924	1 year, 18 days	Independent	Marx I–II	
17		Franz Kempner (1879–1945)	16 January 1925	20 July 1926	1 year, 185 days	German People's Party	Luther I–II; Marx III	
18		Hermann Pünder (1888–1976)	20 July 1926	1 June 1932	5 years, 317 days	Centre Party	Marx III–IV; Müller II; Brüning I–II	
19		Erwin Planck (1893–1945)	1 June 1932	30 January 1933	243 days	Independent	Papen; Schleicher	
20		Hans Lammers (1879–1962)	30 January 1933	24 April 1945	12 years, 84 days	Nazi Party	Hitler	
