= List of German interior ministers =

Federal Minister of the Interior
- Bundesminister des Innern
- Coat of arms

- State flag

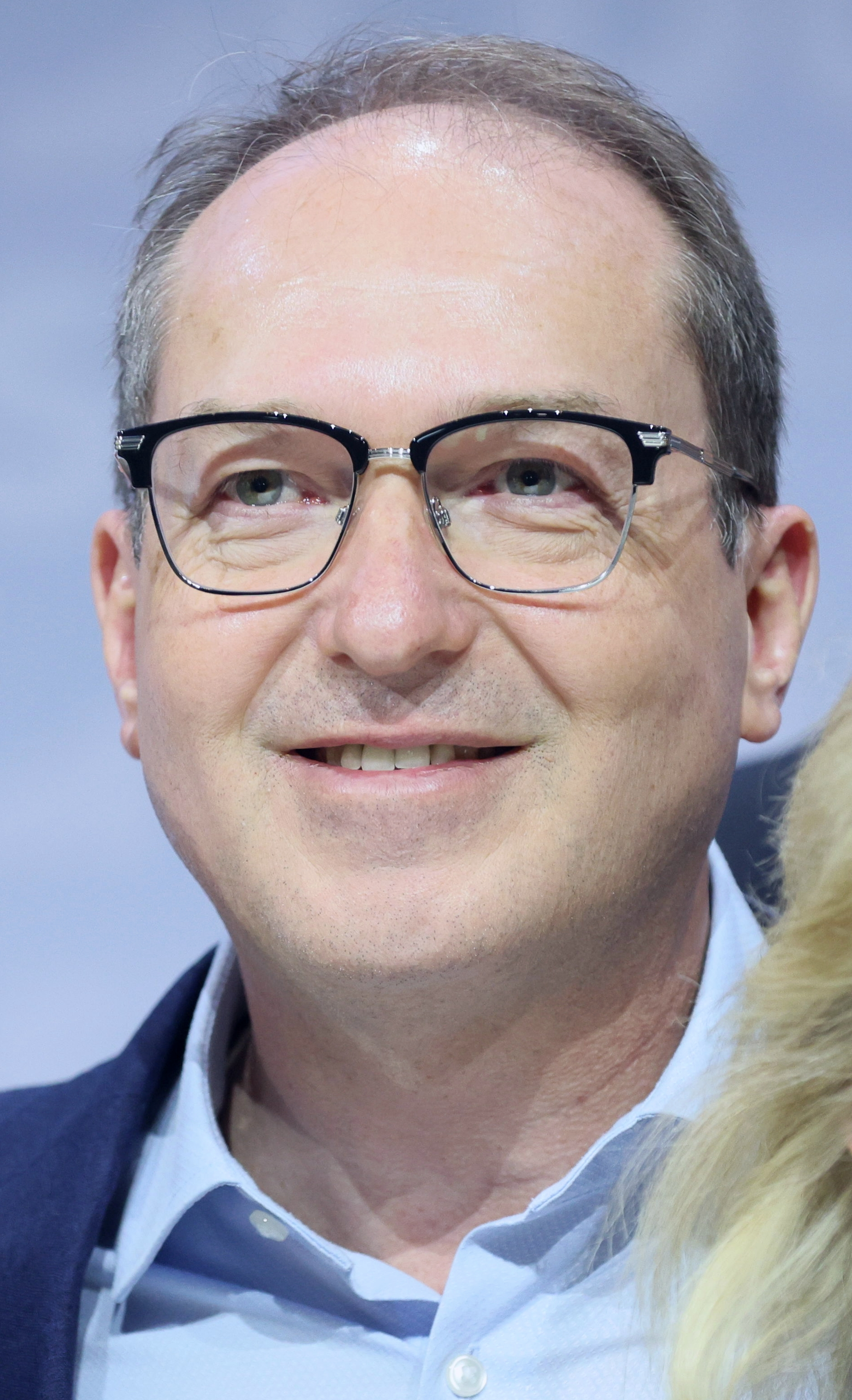
- Incumbent; Alexander Dobrindt since 6 May 2025
- Federal Ministry of the Interior
- Style: Herr Bundesminister
- Member of: Cabinet
- Reports to: Chancellor of Germany
- Seat: Alt-Moabit 140, Berlin
- Appointer: The president; on advice of the chancellor
- Formation: 21 December 1879
- First holder: Karl von Hofmann
- Website: bmi.bund.de

The federal minister of the interior (German: Bundesminister des Innern) is the head of the Federal Ministry of the Interior and a member of the Cabinet of Germany.

The current federal minister of the interior is Alexander Dobrindt, since 6 May 2025.

== List of officeholders ==
=== German Reich (1871–1945) ===
Secretaries of state for the interior (1879–1919)

Political party: Zentrum

Name (Birth–Death)	Portrait	Party	Term of office		Chancellor
Karl von Hofmann (1827–1910)		N/A	21 December 1879	31 August 1880	Bismarck
Karl Heinrich von Boetticher (1833–1907)		N/A	1 September 1880	1 July 1897	Bismarck; Caprivi; Hohenlohe-Schillingsfürst
Arthur von Posadowsky-Wehner (1845–1932)		N/A	1 July 1897	24 June 1907	Hohenlohe-Schillingsfürst; Bülow
Theobald von Bethmann Hollweg (1856–1921)		N/A	24 June 1907	10 July 1909	Bülow
Clemens von Delbrück (1856–1921)		N/A	14 July 1909	22 May 1916	Bethmann Hollweg
Karl Helfferich (1872–1924)		N/A	22 May 1916	24 October 1917	Bethmann Hollweg; Michaelis
Max Wallraf (1859–1941)		N/A	25 October 1917	9 November 1918	Michaelis; Hertling (I); Baden (I)
Karl Trimborn (1854–1921)		Zentrum	14 November 1918	13 February 1919	Ebert (Council of the People's Deputies)

Ministers of the interior (1919–1945)

Political party: DDP SPD DVP DNVP Zentrum NSDAP

No.	Portrait	Minister of the Interior	Took office	Left office	Time in office	Party	Cabinet
1	Hugo Preuß	Hugo Preuß (1860–1925)	13 February 1919	20 June 1919	127 days	DDP	Scheidemann
2	Eduard David	Eduard David (1863–1930)	21 June 1919	3 October 1919	104 days	SPD	Bauer
3	Erich Koch-Weser	Erich Koch-Weser (1875–1944)	3 October 1919	4 May 1921	1 year, 213 days	DDP	Bauer; Müller I Fehrenbach
4	Georg Gradnauer	Georg Gradnauer (1866–1946)	10 May 1921	22 October 1921	165 days	SPD	Wirth I
5	Adolf Köster	Adolf Köster (1883–1930)	26 October 1921	14 November 1922	1 year, 19 days	SPD	Wirth II
6	Rudolf Oeser	Rudolf Oeser (1858–1926)	22 November 1922	12 August 1923	263 days	DDP	Cuno
7	Wilhelm Sollmann	Wilhelm Sollmann (1881–1951)	14 August 1923	3 November 1923	81 days	SPD	Stresemann I
8	Karl Jarres	Karl Jarres (1874–1951)	11 November 1923	15 December 1924	1 year, 34 days	DVP	Stresemann II; Marx I–II
9	Martin Schiele	Martin Schiele (1870–1939)	15 January 1925	23 October 1925	281 days	DNVP	Luther I
–	Otto Gessler	Otto Gessler (1875–1955); Acting	23 October 1925	5 December 1925	43 days	DDP	Luther I
10	Wilhelm Külz	Wilhelm Külz (1875–1948)	20 January 1926	17 December 1926	331 days	DDP	Luther II; Marx III
11	Walter von Keudell	Walter von Keudell (1884–1973)	31 January 1927	12 June 1928	1 year, 133 days	DNVP	Marx IV
12	Carl Severing	Carl Severing (1875–1952)	28 June 1928	27 March 1930	1 year, 272 days	SPD	Müller II
13	Joseph Wirth	Joseph Wirth (1879–1956)	30 March 1930	7 October 1931	1 year, 191 days	Centre	Brüning I
14	Wilhelm Groener	Wilhelm Groener (1867–1939)	9 October 1931	30 May 1932	234 days	Independent	Brüning II
15	Wilhelm von Gayl	Wilhelm von Gayl (1879–1945)	1 June 1932	17 November 1932	169 days	DNVP	Papen
16	Franz Bracht	Franz Bracht (1877–1933)	3 December 1932	28 January 1933	56 days	Independent	Schleicher
17	Wilhelm Frick	Wilhelm Frick (1877–1946)	30 January 1933	20 August 1943	10 years, 202 days	NSDAP	Hitler
18	Heinrich Himmler	Heinrich Himmler (1900–1945)	24 August 1943	29 April 1945	1 year, 248 days	NSDAP	Hitler
19	Paul Giesler	Paul Giesler (1895–1945)	30 April 1945	3 May 1945	3 days	NSDAP	Goebbels
20	Wilhelm Stuckart	Wilhelm Stuckart (1902–1953)	3 May 1945	23 May 1945	20 days	NSDAP	Schwerin von Krosigk

=== German Democratic Republic (1949–1990) ===
Ministers of the interior

Political party: SED DSU

No.	Portrait	Minister of the Interior	Took office	Left office	Time in office	Party	Chairman
1	Karl Steinhoff	Karl Steinhoff (1892–1981)	11 October 1949	6 May 1953	3 years, 6 months	SED	Grotewohl
2	Willi Stoph	Willi Stoph (1914–1999)	6 May 1953	1 July 1955	2 years, 1 month	SED	Grotewohl
3	Karl Maron	Karl Maron (1903–1975)	1 July 1955	14 November 1963	8 years, 4 months	SED	Grotewohl
4	Friedrich Dickel	Friedrich Dickel (1913–1993)	14 November 1963	18 November 1989	26 years	SED	Grotewohl; Stoph; Sindermann; Stoph
5	Lothar Ahrendt	Lothar Ahrendt (born 1936)	18 November 1989	12 April 1990	4 months	SED	Modrow
6	Peter-Michael Diestel	Peter-Michael Diestel (born 1952)	12 April 1990	2 October 1990	5 months	DSU	de Maizière

=== Federal Republic of Germany (1949–present) ===
Ministers of the interior (Bundesminister des Innern), since 1949

Political party: CDU CSU FDP SPD

No.	Portrait	Minister of the Interior	Took office	Left office	Time in office	Party	Cabinet
1	Gustav Heinemann	Gustav Heinemann (1899–1976)	20 September 1949	11 October 1950	1 year, 21 days	CDU	Adenauer I
2	Robert Lehr	Robert Lehr (1883–1956)	11 October 1950	20 October 1953	3 years, 9 days	CDU	Adenauer I
3	Gerhard Schröder	Gerhard Schröder (1910–1989)	20 October 1953	13 November 1961	8 years, 24 days	CDU	Adenauer II–III
4	Hermann Höcherl	Hermann Höcherl (1912–1989)	14 November 1961	25 October 1965	3 years, 345 days	CSU	Adenauer IV–V; Erhard I
5	Paul Lücke	Paul Lücke (1914–1976)	26 October 1965	2 April 1968	2 years, 159 days	CDU	Erhard II; Kiesinger
6	Ernst Benda	Ernst Benda (1925–2009)	2 April 1968	21 October 1969	1 year, 202 days	CDU	Kiesinger
7	Hans-Dietrich Genscher	Hans-Dietrich Genscher (1927–2016)	22 October 1969	16 May 1974	4 years, 216 days	FDP	Brandt I–II
8	Werner Maihofer	Werner Maihofer (1918–2009)	16 May 1974	8 June 1978	4 years, 23 days	FDP	Schmidt I–II
9	Gerhart Baum	Gerhart Baum (1932–2025)	8 June 1978	17 September 1982	4 years, 101 days	FDP	Schmidt II–III
10	Jürgen Schmude	Jürgen Schmude (1936–2025)	17 September 1982	1 October 1982	14 days	SPD	Schmidt III
11	Friedrich Zimmermann	Friedrich Zimmermann (1925–2012)	4 October 1982	21 April 1989	6 years, 199 days	CSU	Kohl I–II–III
12	Wolfgang Schäuble	Wolfgang Schäuble (1942–2023)	21 April 1989	26 November 1991	2 years, 219 days	CDU	Kohl III–IV
13	Rudolf Seiters	Rudolf Seiters (born 1937)	26 November 1991	7 July 1993	1 year, 223 days	CDU	Kohl IV
14	Manfred Kanther	Manfred Kanther (born 1939)	7 July 1993	27 October 1998	5 years, 112 days	CDU	Kohl IV–V
15	Otto Schily	Otto Schily (born 1932)	27 October 1998	22 November 2005	7 years, 26 days	SPD	Schröder I–II
(12)	Wolfgang Schäuble	Wolfgang Schäuble (1942–2023)	22 November 2005	28 October 2009	3 years, 340 days	CDU	Merkel I
16	Thomas de Maizière	Thomas de Maizière (born 1954)	28 October 2009	3 March 2011	1 year, 126 days	CDU	Merkel II
17	Hans-Peter Friedrich	Hans-Peter Friedrich (born 1957)	3 March 2011	17 December 2013	2 years, 289 days	CSU	Merkel II
(16)	Thomas de Maizière	Thomas de Maizière (born 1954)	17 December 2013	14 March 2018	4 years, 87 days	CDU	Merkel III
18	Horst Seehofer	Horst Seehofer (born 1949)	14 March 2018	8 December 2021	3 years, 269 days	CSU	Merkel IV
19	Nancy Faeser	Nancy Faeser (born 1970)	8 December 2021	6 May 2025	3 years, 149 days	SPD	Scholz
20	Alexander Dobrindt	Alexander Dobrindt (born 1970)	6 May 2025	Incumbent	1 year, 158 days	CSU	Merz
