= List of federal ministers of food, agriculture and consumer protection (Germany) =

Federal Ministers of Food, Agriculture and Consumer Protection of Germany
- Bundesminister für Ernährung und Landwirtschaft
- Coat of Arms

- State flag

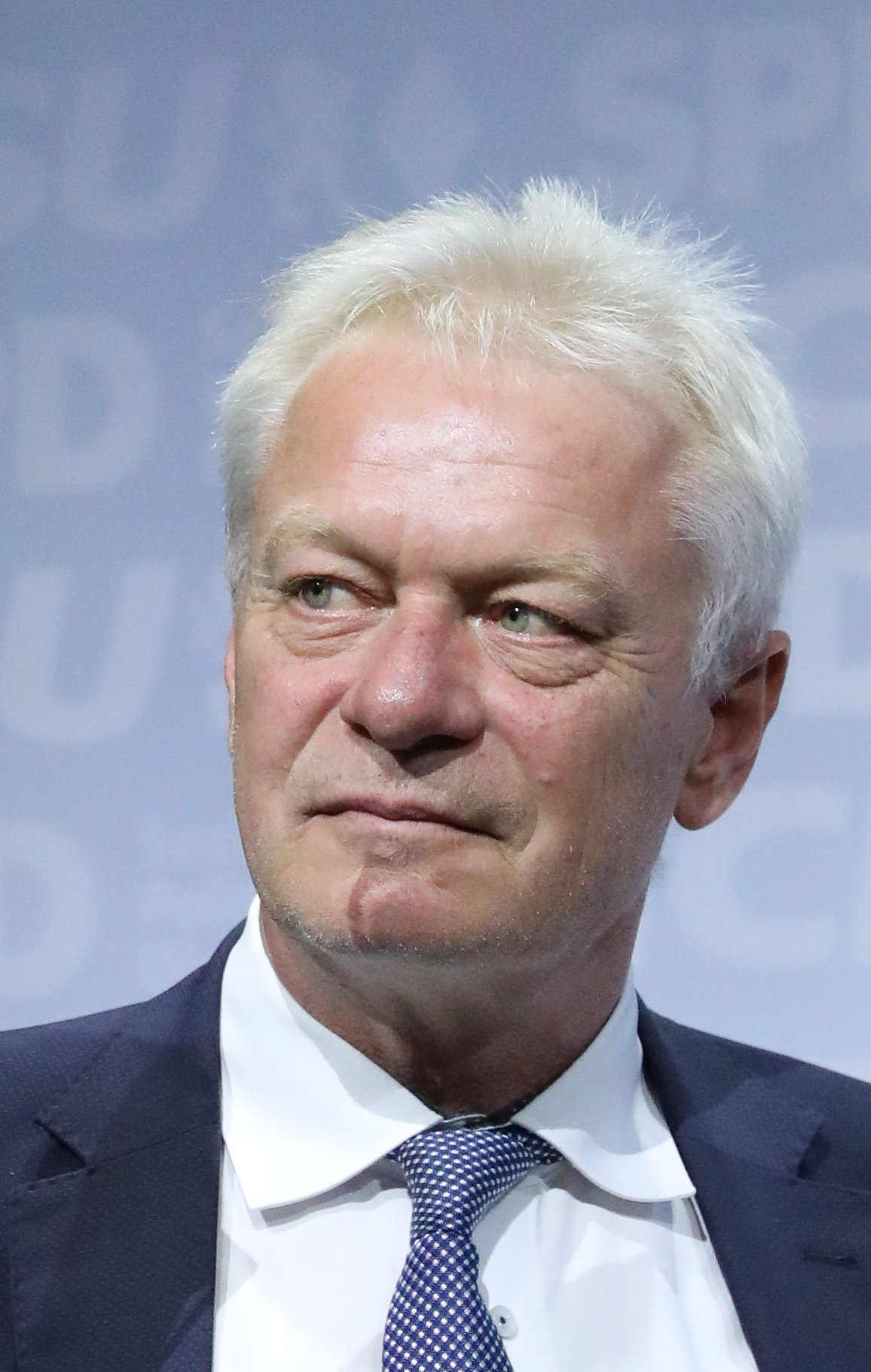
- Incumbent; Alois Rainer since 6 May 2025
- Federal Ministers of Food, Agriculture and Consumer Protection
- Reports to: Chancellor of Germany
- Precursor: Reich Ministry of Food and Agriculture
- Formation: 1949

This article lists federal ministers of food, agriculture and consumer protection of Germany and the equivalents of this office which preceded it.

== German Reich (1919–1945) ==
No.	Portrait	Reichsminister for Food and Agriculture	Took office	Left office	Time in office	Party	Cabinet
Weimarer Republik (1919–1933)
1	Robert Schmidt	Robert Schmidt (1864–1943)	13 February 1919	26 March 1920	1 year, 42 days	SPD	Scheidemann; Bauer
2	Andreas Hermes	Andreas Hermes (1878–1964)	27 March 1920	10 March 1922	1 year, 348 days	Centre	Müller I Fehrenbach; Wirth I Wirth II
3	Anton Fehr	Anton Fehr (1881–1954)	31 March 1922	21 November 1922	256 days	BB	Wirth II
4	Karl Müller	Karl Müller (1884–1964)	22 November 1922	25 November 1922	4 days	Centre	Cuno
5	Hans Luther	Hans Luther (1879–1962)	1 December 1922	4 October 1923	317 days	Independent	Cuno; Stresemann I
6	Gerhard von Kanitz	Gerhard von Kanitz (1885–1949)	6 October 1923	5 December 1925	2 years, 62 days	Independent	Stresemann I Marx I Stresemann II; Marx II; Luther I
7	Heinrich Haslinde	Heinrich Haslinde (1881–1958)	20 January 1926	17 December 1926	331 days	Centre	Luther II; Marx III
8	Martin Schiele	Martin Schiele (1870–1939)	28 January 1927	12 June 1928	1 year, 136 days	DNVP	Luther II; Marx IV
9	Hermann Dietrich	Hermann Dietrich (1879–1954)	28 June 1928	27 March 1930	1 year, 272 days	DDP	Luther II; Müller II
(8)	Martin Schiele	Martin Schiele (1870–1939)	30 March 1930	30 May 1932	2 years, 61 days	DNVP; CNBL	Brüning I Brüning II
10	Magnus Freiherr von Braun	Magnus Freiherr von Braun (1878–1972)	1 June 1932	28 January 1933	241 days	DNVP	Papen; Schleicher
Nazi Germany (1933–1945)
11	Alfred Hugenberg	Alfred Hugenberg (1865–1951)	30 January 1933	29 June 1933	150 days	DNVP	Hitler
12	Richard Walther Darré	Richard Walther Darré (1895–1953)	30 June 1933	23 May 1942	8 years, 327 days	NSDAP	Hitler
13	Herbert Backe	Herbert Backe (1896–1947)	23 May 1942	23 May 1945	3 years, 0 days	NSDAP	Hitler; Goebbels; Schwerin von Krosigk

== Federal Republic of Germany (1949–present) ==
Political Party: CSU CDU FDP SPD Green

No.	Portrait	Name	Took office	Left office	Time in office	Party	Cabinet
Federal Minister for Food, Agriculture and Forests
1	Wilhelm Niklas	Wilhelm Niklas (1887–1957)	20 September 1949	20 October 1953	4 years, 30 days	CSU	Adenauer (I)
2	Heinrich Lübke	Heinrich Lübke (1894–1972)	20 October 1953	15 September 1959	5 years, 330 days	CDU	Adenauer (II • III)
3	Werner Schwarz	Werner Schwarz (1900–1982)	30 September 1959	26 October 1965	6 years, 26 days	CDU	Adenauer (III • IV • V); Erhard (I)
4	Hermann Höcherl	Hermann Höcherl (1912–1989)	26 October 1965	21 October 1969	3 years, 360 days	CSU	Erhard (II); Kiesinger (I)
5	Josef Ertl	Josef Ertl (1925–2000)	22 October 1969	17 September 1982	12 years, 330 days	FDP	Brandt (I • II); Schmidt (I • II • III)
6	Björn Engholm	Björn Engholm (born 1939)	17 September 1982	1 October 1982	14 days	SPD	Schmidt (III)
(5)	Josef Ertl	Josef Ertl (1925–2000)	4 October 1982	29 March 1983	176 days	FDP	Kohl (I)
7	Ignaz Kiechle	Ignaz Kiechle (1930–2003)	30 March 1983	21 January 1993	9 years, 297 days	CSU	Kohl (II • III • IV)
8	Jochen Borchert	Jochen Borchert (born 1940)	21 January 1993	26 October 1998	5 years, 278 days	CSU	Kohl (IV • V)
9	Karl-Heinz Funke	Karl-Heinz Funke (born 1946)	27 October 1998	12 January 2001	2 years, 77 days	SPD	Schröder (I)
Federal Minister for Consumer Protection, Food and Agriculture
10	Renate Künast	Renate Künast (born 1955)	12 January 2001	4 October 2005	4 years, 265 days	Greens	Schröder (I • II)
Federal Minister for Food, Agriculture and Consumer Protection
11	Horst Seehofer	Horst Seehofer (born 1949)	22 November 2005	27 October 2008	3 years, 23 days	CSU	Merkel (I)
12	Ilse Aigner	Ilse Aigner (born 1964)	31 October 2008	30 September 2013	4 years, 303 days	CSU	Merkel (I • II)
13	Hans-Peter Friedrich	Hans-Peter Friedrich (born 1957)	30 September 2013	17 December 2013	78 days	CSU	Merkel (III)
Federal Minister for Food and Agriculture
(13)	Hans-Peter Friedrich	Hans-Peter Friedrich (born 1957)	17 December 2013	17 February 2014	62 days	CSU	Merkel (III)
14	Christian Schmidt	Christian Schmidt (born 1957)	17 February 2014	14 March 2018	4 years, 25 days	CSU	Merkel (III)
15	Julia Klöckner	Julia Klöckner (born 1972)	14 March 2018	8 December 2021	3 years, 269 days	CDU	Merkel (IV)
16	Cem Özdemir	Cem Özdemir (born 1965)	8 December 2021	6 May 2025	3 years, 149 days	Greens	Scholz (I)
Federal Minister for Agriculture, Food and Regional Identity
17	Alois Rainer	Alois Rainer (born 1965)	6 May 2025		1 year, 200 days	CSU	Merz (Merz cabinet)
