= Hans Lammers =

German jurist and Nazi politician (1879–1962)

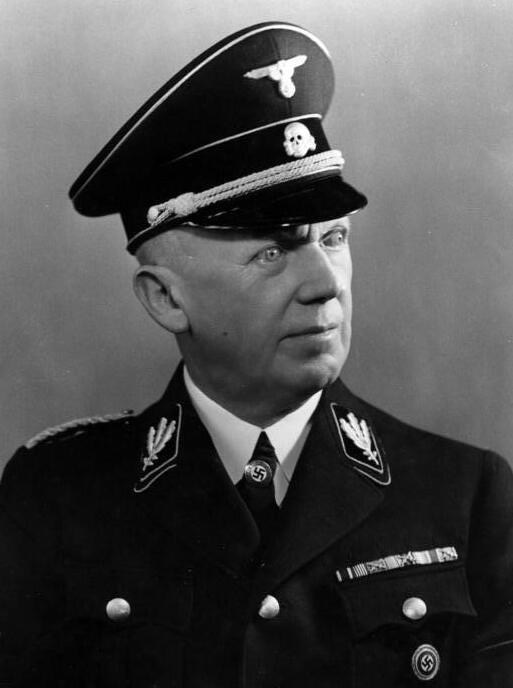
- Lammers in 1938

Chief of the Reich Chancellery
- In office 30 January 1933 – 23 April 1945
- Führer: Adolf Hitler
- Preceded by: Erwin Planck
- Succeeded by: Position abolished

President of the Reich Cabinet (Presiding Officer in Hitler's Absence)
- In office January 1943 – 23 April 1945

Personal details
- Born: Hans Heinrich Lammers; 27 May 1879 Lublinitz, Silesia, Prussia, German Empire
- Died: 4 January 1962 (aged 82) Düsseldorf, West Germany
- Party: Nazi Party
- Other political affiliations: German National People's Party (until 1932)
- Spouse: Elfriede Tepel (m. 1913; died 1945)
- Children: 3
- Education: Law
- Alma mater: German University of Breslau; Heidelberg University
- Profession: Judge
- Cabinet: Hitler Cabinet

Military service
- Allegiance: German Empire; Nazi Germany
- Branch/service: Imperial German Army; Schutzstaffel
- Years of service: 1914–1918; 1933–1945
- Rank: Hauptmann; SS-Obergruppenführer
- Battles/wars: World War I
- Awards: Iron Cross, 1st class

Hans Heinrich Lammers (27 May 1879 – 4 January 1962) was a German jurist and prominent Nazi Party politician. From 1933 until 1945 he served as Chief of the Reich Chancellery under Adolf Hitler. In 1937, he additionally was given the post of Reichsminister ('minister of the realm') in the cabinet. During the 1948–1949 Ministries Trial, Lammers was found guilty of crimes against peace, war crimes, crimes against humanity, and membership in a criminal organization. He was sentenced to 20 years in prison in April 1949, but this was later reduced to 10 years and he was released early.

== Early life ==
Born in Lublinitz (now Lubliniec, Poland) in Upper Silesia, the son of a veterinarian, Lammers completed law school at the universities of Breslau (today, Wrocław) and Heidelberg, obtained his doctorate in 1904, and was appointed judge at the Amtsgericht ('district court') of Beuthen (Bytom) in 1912. During World War I he entered the Imperial German Army as an officer. He was severely wounded in 1917, losing his left eye, and was awarded the Iron Cross, First Class. Discharged from the military after the war with the rank of Hauptmann ('captain'), he joined the national conservative German National People's Party (DNVP) and resumed his career as a lawyer reaching the position of undersecretary at the Reich Ministry of the Interior by 1922.

== Nazi career ==
Lammers joined the Nazi Party with an effective date of 1 March 1932 and achieved rapid advancement. (Note: His membership number was 1,010,355.) He was appointed head of the police office in the Interior Ministry and, after the Nazi seizure of power on 30 January 1933, was appointed Chief of the Reich Chancellery with the rank of Staatssekretär ('secretary of state'). At the recommendation of Interior Reichsminister Wilhelm Frick, he became the centre of communications and chief legal adviser for all government departments. In October 1933, he was made a member of Hans Frank's Academy for German Law. On 26 November 1937, his rank in the Hitler cabinet was elevated to Reichsminister and he retained his post as chief of the Reich Chancellery.

On 30 August 1939, immediately prior to the outbreak of the Second World War, Lammers was appointed by Hitler to the six-person Council of Ministers for Defense of the Reich, which was set up to operate as a "war cabinet". In that position, he was able to review all pertinent documents regarding national security and domestic policy even before they were forwarded to Hitler in person. The historian Martin Kitchen explains that the centralization of power accorded to the Reich Chancellery and therefore to its head made Lammers become "one of the most important men in Nazi Germany". He became a interlocutor between the administrative officials. From the vantage point of most government officers, Lammers seemed to speak on behalf of Hitler, the ultimate authority within the Reich. Lammers was also one of the first officials to sign government correspondence with Heil Hitler, which became a requisite greeting for civil servants and eventually so ubiquitous that failure to use it was considered an "overt sign of dissidence", which could trigger attention from the Gestapo. Lammers had joined the Schutzstaffel (SS) in September 1933, (Note: His SS number was 118,401.) and attained the rank of SS-Obergruppenführer (lit. 'SS senior group leader') on 20 April 1940.

From January 1943, Lammers served as president of the cabinet when Hitler was absent from their meetings. Along with Martin Bormann, he increasingly controlled access to Hitler. By early 1943, the war produced a labour crisis for the regime. Hitler agreed to the creation of a three-man committee with representatives of the state, the army and the party in an attempt to centralise control of the war economy and over the home front. The committee members were Lammers (chief of the Reich Chancellery), Field Marshal Wilhelm Keitel, chief of the Oberkommando der Wehrmacht ('armed forces high command', abbreviated to OKW), and Bormann, who controlled the party. Hitler seemed to be in agreement with that proposal since none of them posed a threat to his leadership or would disagree with him. The committee was intended to independently propose measures regardless of the wishes of various ministries, with Hitler reserving most final decisions to himself. The committee, soon known as the Dreierausschuß ('committee of three'), met eleven times between January and August 1943. However, it ran up against resistance from Hitler's cabinet ministers, who headed deeply-entrenched spheres of influence and were excluded from the committee. Seeing it as a threat to their power, Joseph Goebbels, Albert Speer, Hermann Göring and Heinrich Himmler worked together to bring it down. The result was that nothing changed, and the Dreierausschuß declined into irrelevance.

Over time, Lammers lost power and influence because of the increasing irrelevancy of his position due to the war and as a consequence of Martin Bormann's growing influence with Hitler. After being eclipsed in power by Bormann, Lammers suffered from depression. In March 1945, under the pretense of failing health, he left Berlin for Berchtesgaden.

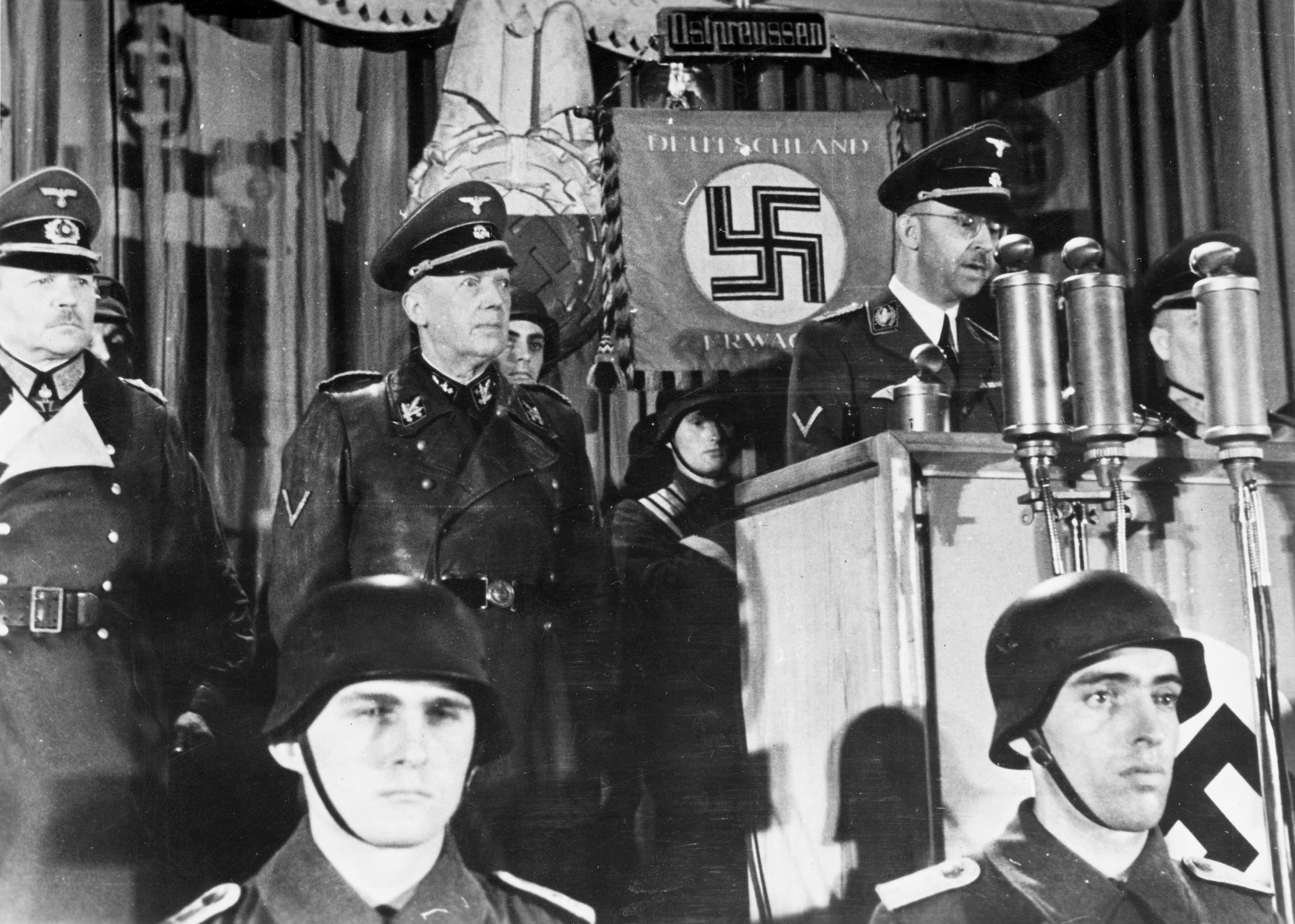
Himmler (at podium) with Heinz Guderian and Hans Lammers in October 1944

=== 1945 ===
In April 1945, Lammers was arrested by SS troops during the final days of the Nazi regime, in connection with the upheaval surrounding Hermann Göring. On 23 April, as the Soviets tightened the encirclement of Berlin, Göring consulted Luftwaffe General Karl Koller and Lammers. All agreed that Göring was Hitler's designated successor and was to act as his deputy if Hitler ever became incapacitated.

Göring concluded that by remaining in Berlin to face certain death, Hitler had incapacitated himself from governing. Acting on the matter, Göring sent a telegram from Berchtesgaden, Bavaria, arguing that since Hitler was cut off in Berlin, Göring should assume leadership of Germany. Göring set a time limit of 10 pm that night (23 April), when he would consider Hitler incapacitated.

The telegram was intercepted by Bormann, who convinced Hitler that Göring was a traitor and that the telegram was a demand to resign or be overthrown. Hitler responded angrily and ordered SS troops to arrest Göring. Soon afterwards, Hitler removed Göring from all of his offices and ordered Göring, his staff and Lammers to be placed under house arrest at Obersalzberg. Lammers was taken prisoner by US forces, but in the meantime, his wife, Elfriede (née Tepel), committed suicide near Obersalzberg (the site of Hitler's mountain retreat) in early May 1945, as did his daughter, Ilse, two days later.

=== Postwar insights ===
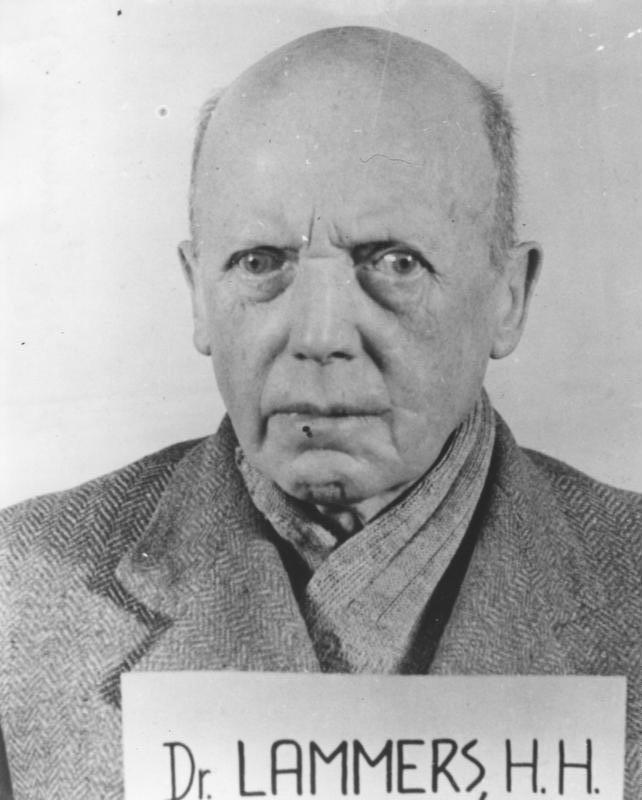
Lammers in 1947 facing trial for crimes against humanity

After the war's conclusion, Lammers provided Allied interrogators with some insights into the nature of the Third Reich's hierarchy. Postwar mythology was such that many were convinced Hitler had completely ostracised the aristocratic officers under his command, but the truth was somewhat different. Lammers reported to the Allies that Nazi kingpins and high-ranking Wehrmacht officers received lavish gifts, severance packages, expropriated estates and huge cash awards. Recipients of such benefits included Generals Heinz Guderian, Paul Ludwig Ewald von Kleist, Wilhelm Ritter von Leeb, Gerd von Rundstedt, and one of the Holocaust's chief architects, Reinhard Heydrich.

== Trial, conviction and death ==
In April 1946 Lammers was a defence witness at the trial before the International Military Tribunal in Nuremberg. Starting in April 1949, he was in the dock as one of the defendants in the Ministries Trial, one of the subsequent Nuremberg trials, and was convicted and sentenced to 20 years in prison. The sentence was later commuted to 10 years by US High Commissioner John J. McCloy, and he was released from Landsberg Prison on 15 December 1951. Lammers died on 4 January 1962 in Düsseldorf and was buried in Berchtesgaden, in the same plot as his wife and daughter.

== Sources ==
- Broszat, Martin (1981). The Hitler State: The Foundation and Development of the Internal Structure of the Third Reich. New York: Longman Inc. ISBN 0-582-49200-9.
- Evans, Richard (2006). The Third Reich in Power. New York: Penguin Books. ISBN 978-0-14-303790-3.
- Evans, Richard J. (2008). The Third Reich at War. New York: Penguin. ISBN 978-0-14-311671-4.
- Fischer, Klaus (1995). Nazi Germany: A New History. New York: Continuum. ISBN 978-0-82640-797-9.
- Hanson, Victor Davis (2017). The Second World Wars: How the First Global Conflict Was Fought and Won. New York: Basic Books. ISBN 978-0-46506-698-8.
- Kershaw, Ian (2008). Hitler: A Biography. New York: W. W. Norton & Company. ISBN 978-0-393-06757-6.
- Kirk, Tim (1995). The Longman Companion to Nazi Germany. New York: Routledge.
- Kitchen, Martin (1995). Nazi Germany at War. New York: Longman. ISBN 978-0582073876.
- "Former Hitler Aide Released". The New York Times. 16 December 1951. p. 12.
- "Hans Heinrich Lammers". NNDB.
- Read, Anthony (2005). The Devil's Disciples: Hitler's Inner Circle. New York: Norton. ISBN 978-039332-697-0.
- Reitlinger, Gerald (1989). The SS: Alibi of a Nation, 1922–1945. New York: Da Capo Press.
- Shirer, William Lawrence (1960). The Rise and Fall of the Third Reich: A History of Nazi Germany. New York City: Simon & Schuster. ASIN B0766DKDLR. LCCN 60006729. OCLC 1286630. OL 5794925M. Wikidata Q138029595.
- Snyder, Louis (1976). Encyclopedia of the Third Reich. New York: McGraw-Hill.
- Stackelberg, Roderick (2007). The Routledge Companion to Nazi Germany. New York: Routledge.
- Villatoux, Paul; Aiolfi, Xavier (2020). The Final Archives of the Führerbunker: Berlin in 1945, the Chancellery and the Last Days of Hitler. Casemate. ISBN 978-1-61200-904-9.
- Williams, Max (2017). SS Elite: The Senior Leaders of Hitler's Praetorian Guard. Vol. 2. Fonthill Media LLC. ISBN 978-1-78155-434-0.
- Wistrich, Robert (2001). Who's Who in Nazi Germany. New York: Routledge. ISBN 978-0-41511-888-0.
- Zentner, Christian; Bedürftig, Friedemann (1991). The Encyclopedia of the Third Reich. New York: MacMillan Publishing. ISBN 0-02-897500-6.
