= Vice-Chancellor of Germany =

German cabinet member

Deputy to the Federal Chancellor
- Stellvertreter des Bundeskanzlers
- Coat of Arms of the German Government

- Flag of Germany

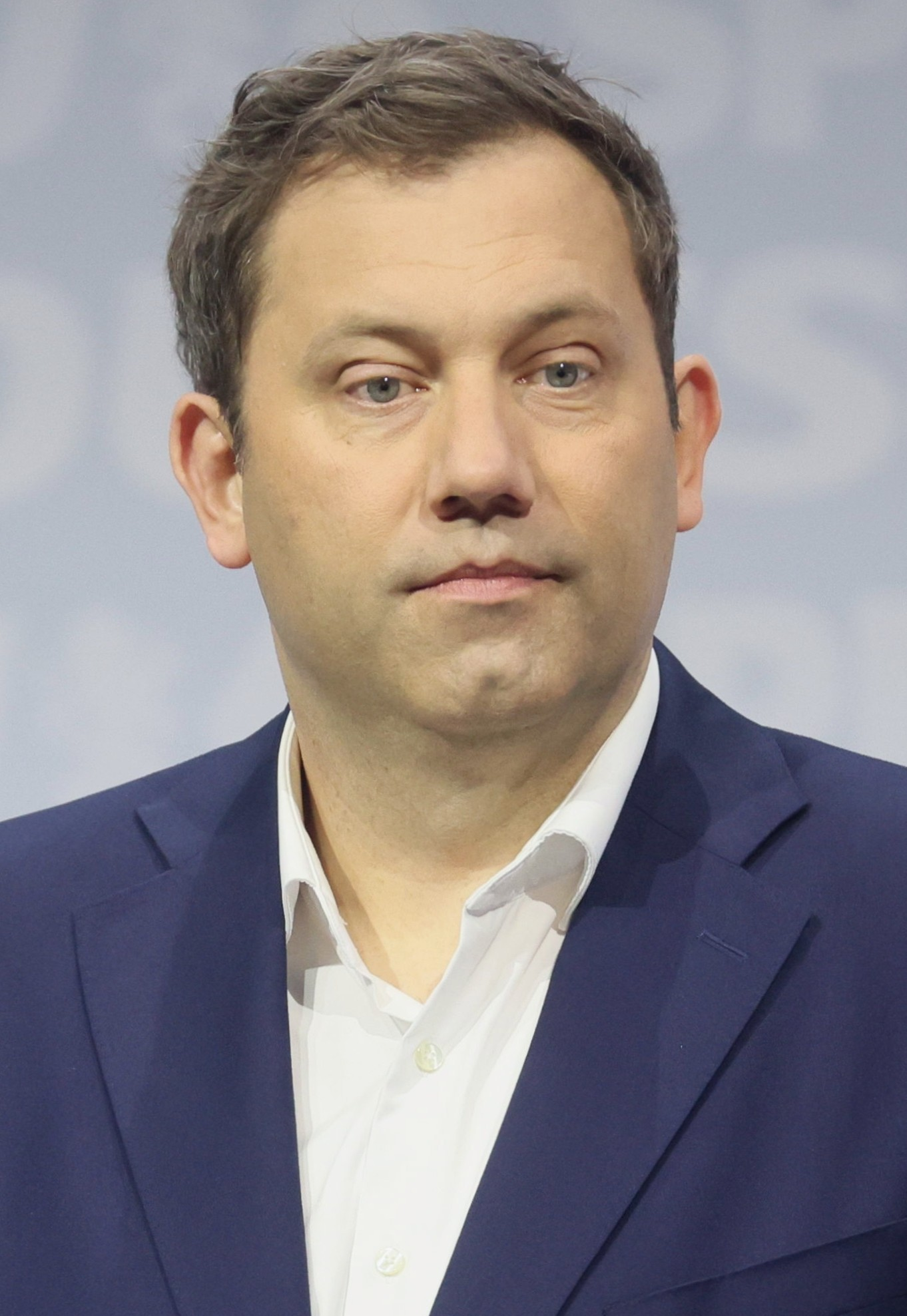
- Incumbent; Lars Klingbeil since 6 May 2025
- Style: Mr. Vice-chancellor (informal); His Excellency (diplomatic)
- Status: Deputy head of government
- Member of: Federal Cabinet
- Seat: As Federal Minister; currently Federal Ministry of Finance, Berlin/Bonn
- Nominator: Chancellor or the coalition party
- Appointer: Chancellor
- Term length: At the chancellor's pleasure
- Constituting instrument: German Basic Law (German Constitution)
- Formation: 24 May 1949; 77 years ago
- First holder: Franz Blücher

The vice-chancellor of Germany, officially the deputy to the federal chancellor (German: Stellvertreter des Bundeskanzlers), is the second highest ranking German cabinet member. The chancellor is the head of government and, according to the constitution, gives this title of deputy to one of the federal ministers. It is custom that the title is given to a minister of the largest coalition partner, from 1966 to 2011 typically the foreign minister, though since 2011 the minister for economic affairs has held the title most often.

In everyday politics, being vice-chancellor is considered more of an honorary title. The vice-chancellor may head cabinet meetings when the chancellor is absent. The function of vice-chancellor is to use the specific constitutional powers of the chancellor in case that the chancellor is unable to perform their duties. This kind of substitution has never been made use of in the history of the Federal Republic. Should a chancellor resign, die or be permanently unable to perform the duties of office, the vice-chancellor does not automatically become the next chancellor. In such a case the Federal President assigns a minister to serve as acting chancellor until the Bundestag (parliament) elects a new chancellor.

Although Stellvertreter is the constitutional term, vice-chancellor (Vizekanzler) is used more commonly. Chancellor (Kanzler) is the traditional term for the German head of government since 1867/71. A general deputy was introduced by law in 1878 (Stellvertretungsgesetz). In the Weimar Republic of 1919–1933, the office of Vizekanzler was mentioned in the internal regulation of the government. The current title has existed since the constitution of 1949.

Lars Klingbeil (Social Democratic Party) is the current officeholder since 6 May 2025.

== History ==
Such an office was initially established by the 1878 Stellvertretungsgesetz (Deputation Act), which provided for the imperial chancellor appointing a deputy, officially known as Allgemeiner Stellvertreter des Reichskanzlers (General Deputy to the Imperial Chancellor). In addition to the general deputy, who could sign for all the affairs of the chancellor, the chancellor could appoint deputies with limited responsibilities. The act was revised on 28 October 1918, when the possibility of appointing deputies with limited responsibilities was removed and the vice-chancellor was given the right to appear before parliament.

In the Weimar Republic, the office was considered less important. It was not even mentioned in the constitution. Usually it was held by the minister of justice or the interior. The most known office holder is Franz von Papen, a former chancellor who formed a coalition government of national socialists and conservatives. Adolf Hitler became chancellor, and Papen vice-chancellor. It became soon obvious that the position of vice-chancellor provided no powers and was unsuited to constrain Hitler. Papen was convinced that him being trusted by president Hindenburg made him an important political player; soon, Hindenburg's trust went from Papen to Hitler.

In the Federal Republic (since 1949), the chancellors have had no interest in allowing the deputy to use the title for self-promotion. Since 1966 it became customary that the coalition partner of the governing party received the ministry of foreign affairs, who was also appointed deputy. The ministry of foreign affairs was considered to be the most important cabinet post besides the chancellorship. This tradition faded away during the tenure of Angela Merkel, partially because the leaders of her coalition partners chose a different ministry.

== Office and appointment mechanism ==
The German cabinet consists of the chancellor and the federal ministers. According to the Basic Law (Article 69.1), the chancellor appoints one of the ministers as vice-chancellor. In contrast to the appointment of a cabinet minister, there is no need for a formal appointment by the president. The appointment is an exclusive power of the chancellor.

The chancellor is theoretically free to choose a deputy chancellor. In practice, a German government is usually based on a coalition of two or more parties and the chancellor gives the title to a minister of the second largest coalition party upon recommendation of that party's leadership.

The German vice-chancellor can be regarded as the equivalent of a deputy prime minister in other parliamentary systems. Unlike the vice president post in presidential systems of governments, the German vice-chancellor is not the automatic successor in the event that a sitting chancellor suddenly leaves office.

A German cabinet exists only as long as the current chancellor is in office. The end of a chancellor's term in office (either by death or resignation or the first meeting of a newly elected Bundestag) automatically terminates the office of any minister. If this happens, the president of Germany appoints the former chancellor or, if this is not possible, one of the former cabinet ministers (not necessarily, but most likely the former vice-chancellor) as acting chancellor, until the parliament elects a new chancellor. When in 1974 Chancellor Willy Brandt resigned and refused to remain in office until his successor's election, President Gustav Heinemann ensured a corresponding precedent and appointed former vice-chancellor Walter Scheel as acting chancellor.

The Basic Law does not state who shall perform the chancellor's powers and duties, if both the chancellor and the vice-chancellor are unable to do so. The German cabinet's rules of procedure state that in absence of both office-holders cabinet meetings shall be chaired by a cabinet member designated for this purpose by either the chancellor or the vice-chancellor or, if such a designation has not taken place or if the designee is not able to do so, by the present cabinet member with the longest uninterrupted membership in the federal government (§22.1). It is however unclear, whether this provision extends to other powers of the office of chancellor. In an expertise issued by the Bundestag's scientific service in 2014, the legal opinion is that this is the case.

== List of vice-chancellors ==
=== German Reich (1871–1945) ===
==== German Empire (1871–1918) ====
Political party: FKP FVP

No.	Portrait	Name	Term start	Term end	Days	Party	Portfolio	Cabinet
1		Otto Graf zu Stolberg-Wernigerode (1837–1896)	1 June 1878	20 June 1881	1115	FKP		Bismarck
2		Karl Heinrich von Boetticher (1833–1907)	20 June 1881	1 July 1897	5855	FKP	Secretary of State for the Interior	Bismarck
2		Karl Heinrich von Boetticher (1833–1907)	20 June 1881	1 July 1897	5855	FKP	Secretary of State for the Interior	Caprivi
2		Karl Heinrich von Boetticher (1833–1907)	20 June 1881	1 July 1897	5855	FKP	Secretary of State for the Interior	Hohenlohe-Schillingsfürst
3		Arthur von Posadowsky-Wehner (1845–1932)	1 July 1897	24 June 1907	3644	FKP	Secretary of State for the Interior	Hohenlohe-Schillingsfürst
3		Arthur von Posadowsky-Wehner (1845–1932)	1 July 1897	24 June 1907	3644	FKP	Secretary of State for the Interior	Bülow
4		Theobald von Bethmann Hollweg (1856–1921)	24 June 1907	14 July 1909	751	Independent	Secretary of State for the Interior	Bülow
5		Clemens von Delbrück (1856–1921)	14 July 1909	22 May 1916	2501	Independent	Secretary of State for the Interior	Bethmann Hollweg
6		Karl Helfferich (1872–1924)	22 May 1916	9 November 1917	536	Independent	Secretary of State for the Interior (until 23 October 1917)	Bethmann Hollweg
6		Karl Helfferich (1872–1924)	22 May 1916	9 November 1917	536	Independent	Secretary of State for the Interior (until 23 October 1917)	Michaelis
6		Karl Helfferich (1872–1924)	22 May 1916	9 November 1917	536	Independent	Secretary of State for the Interior (until 23 October 1917)	Hertling
7		Friedrich von Payer (1847–1931)	9 November 1917	10 November 1918	366	FVP		Hertling
7		Friedrich von Payer (1847–1931)	9 November 1917	10 November 1918	366	FVP		Baden
7		Friedrich von Payer (1847–1931)	9 November 1917	10 November 1918	366	FVP		Ebert

==== Weimar Republic (1918–1933) ====
Political party: DDP Centre DVP SPD DNVP

No.	Portrait	Name	Term start	Term end	Days	Party	Portfolio	Cabinet
1		Eugen Schiffer (1860–1954)	13 February 1919	19 April 1919	65	DDP	Deputy Minister-President & Minister of Finance	Scheidemann
The office was vacant from 19 April to 30 April 1919.
2		Bernhard Dernburg (1865–1937)	30 April 1919	21 June 1919	52	DDP	Deputy Minister-President & Minister of Finance	Scheidemann
3		Matthias Erzberger (1875–1921)	21 June 1919	3 October 1919	104	Centre	Deputy Minister-President (until 14 August 1919) & Minister of Finance	Bauer
4 (1)		Eugen Schiffer (1860–1954)	3 October 1919	27 March 1920	176	DDP	Minister of Justice	Bauer
5		Erich Koch-Weser (1875–1944)	27 March 1920	21 June 1920	86	DDP	Minister of the Interior	Müller I
The office was vacant from 21 June to 25 June 1920.
6		Rudolf Heinze (1865–1928)	25 June 1920	10 May 1921	319	DVP	Minister of Justice	Fehrenbach
7		Gustav Bauer (1870–1944)	10 May 1921	22 November 1922	561	SPD	Minister of Finance	Wirth I
7		Gustav Bauer (1870–1944)	10 May 1921	22 November 1922	561	SPD	Minister of Finance	Wirth II
The office was vacant from 22 November 1922 to 13 August 1923.
8		Robert Schmidt (1864–1943)	13 August 1923	6 October 1923	54	SPD	Minister for Reconstruction	Stresemann I
The office was vacant from 6 October to 30 November 1923.
9		Karl Jarres (1874–1951)	30 November 1923	15 December 1924	381	DVP	Minister of the Interior	Marx I
9		Karl Jarres (1874–1951)	30 November 1923	15 December 1924	381	DVP	Minister of the Interior	Marx II
The office was vacant from 15 December 1924 to 28 January 1927.
10		Oskar Hergt (1869–1967)	28 January 1927	28 June 1928	517	DNVP	Minister of Justice	Marx IV
The office was vacant from 28 June 1928 to 30 March 1930.
11		Hermann Dietrich (1879–1954)	30 March 1930	1 June 1932	794	DDP	Minister of Finance (from 26 June 1930)	Brüning I
11		Hermann Dietrich (1879–1954)	30 March 1930	1 June 1932	794	DDP	Minister of Finance (from 26 June 1930)	Brüning II
The office was vacant from 1 June 1932 to 30 January 1933.

==== Nazi Germany (1933–1945) ====
No.	Portrait	Name	Term start	Term end	Days	Party	Portfolio	Other positions	Cabinet
The deputy to the chancellor of the Reich
12		Franz von Papen (1879–1969)	30 January 1933	7 August 1934	554	Non-partisan		Minister President of Prussia (until 10 April 1933)	Hitler
From 7 August 1934 until 20 September 1949, the office of the vice-chancellor of Germany was abolished.

=== Federal Republic of Germany (1949–present) ===
Political party: FDP CDU SPD Green

No.	Portrait	Name	Term start	Term end	Days	Party	Portfolio	Cabinet
1		Franz Blücher (1896–1959)	20 September 1949	29 October 1957	2961	FDP (until 1956); FVP (1956–57); DP (1957–)	Marshall Plan (later renamed to Economic Cooperation)	Adenauer I • II
2		Ludwig Erhard (1897–1977)	29 October 1957	16 October 1963	2178	CDU	Economic Affairs	Adenauer III • IV
3		Erich Mende (1916–1998)	17 October 1963	28 October 1966	1107	FDP	Intra-German Relations	Erhard I • II
The office was vacant from 28 October to 8 November 1966.
4		Hans-Christoph Seebohm (1903–1967)	8 November 1966	1 December 1966	22	CDU	Transport	Erhard II
5		Willy Brandt (1913–1992)	1 December 1966	22 October 1969	1054	SPD	Foreign Affairs	Kiesinger
6		Walter Scheel (1919–2016)	22 October 1969	16 May 1974	1668	FDP	Foreign Affairs	Brandt I • II
7		Hans-Dietrich Genscher (1927–2016); First term	17 May 1974	17 September 1982	3045	FDP	Foreign Affairs	Schmidt I • II • III
8		Egon Franke (1913–1995)	17 September 1982	1 October 1982	14	SPD	Intra-German Relations	Schmidt III
The office was vacant from 1 October to 4 October 1982.
9 (7)		Hans-Dietrich Genscher (1927–2016); Second term	4 October 1982	18 May 1992	3516	FDP	Foreign Affairs	Kohl I • II • III • IV
10		Jürgen Möllemann (1945–2003)	18 May 1992	21 January 1993	248	FDP	Economic Affairs	Kohl IV
11		Klaus Kinkel (1936–2019)	21 January 1993	27 October 1998	2104	FDP	Foreign Affairs	Kohl IV • V
12		Joschka Fischer (born 1948)	27 October 1998	22 November 2005	2583	Green	Foreign Affairs	Schröder I • II
13		Franz Müntefering (born 1940)	22 November 2005	21 November 2007	729	SPD	Labour and Social Affairs	Merkel I
14		Frank-Walter Steinmeier (born 1956)	21 November 2007	27 October 2009	706	SPD	Foreign Affairs	Merkel I
15		Guido Westerwelle (1961–2016)	27 October 2009	16 May 2011	565	FDP	Foreign Affairs	Merkel II
16		Philipp Rösler (born 1973)	16 May 2011	17 December 2013	946	FDP	Economic Affairs	Merkel II
17		Sigmar Gabriel (born 1959)	17 December 2013	14 March 2018	1548	SPD	Economic Affairs (2013–17); Foreign Affairs (2017–18)	Merkel III
18		Olaf Scholz (born 1958)	14 March 2018	8 December 2021	1365	SPD	Finance	Merkel IV
19		Robert Habeck (born 1969)	8 December 2021	6 May 2025	1789	Green	Economic Affairs and Climate Protection	Scholz
20		Lars Klingbeil (born 1978)	6 May 2025	Incumbent	544	SPD	Finance	Merz
