= Bismarck cabinet =

German imperial cabinet from 1871 to 1890

Cabinet of Otto von Bismarck
- 1st Cabinet of the German Empire
- 1871 – 1890
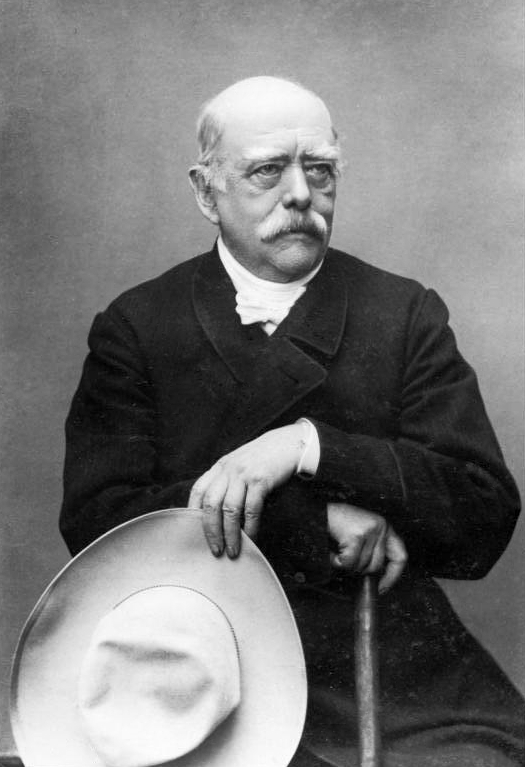
- Otto von Bismarck
- Date formed: 21 March 1871
- Date dissolved: 20 March 1890 (18 years, 11 months, 3 weeks and 6 days)

People and organisations
- Emperor: Wilhelm I Friedrich III; Wilhelm II
- Chancellor: Otto von Bismarck
- Vice Chancellor: Otto zu Stolberg-Wernigerode (until 20 June 1881); Karl Heinrich von Boetticher (from 20 June 1881)
- Member parties: Independent; Supported by: National Liberal Party (until 1878; from 1884); Centre Party (1878-1884); German Progress Party (until 1878); German Conservative Party (from 1878); Free Conservative Party; Imperial Liberal Party
- Status in legislature: Majority

History
- Elections: 1871 federal election 1874 federal election 1877 federal election 1878 federal election 1881 federal election 1884 federal election 1887 federal election
- Predecessor: n/a
- Successor: Caprivi cabinet

The Bismarck Cabinet was the first cabinet of the German Empire, led by Otto von Bismarck from the unification of Germany in 1871 until 1890.

== Composition ==
| Portfolio | Minister | Took office | Left office | Party |
|---|---|---|---|---|
| Reich Chancellor | Otto von Bismarck | 21 March 1871 | 20 March 1890 | Independent |
| Vice Chancellor (from 17 March 1878) | Otto Graf zu Stolberg-Wernigerode | 1 June 1878 | 20 June 1881 | FKP |
| Vice Chancellor (from 17 March 1878) | Karl Heinrich von Boetticher | 20 June 1881 | 1 July 1897 | FKP |
| State Secretary for Foreign Affairs | Hermann von Thile | 21 March 1871 | 30 September 1872 | Independent |
| State Secretary for Foreign Affairs | Hermann Ludwig von Balan | 3 October 1872 | 9 October 1873 | Independent |
| State Secretary for Foreign Affairs | Bernhard Ernst von Bülow | 9 October 1872 | 20 October 1879 | Independent |
| State Secretary for Foreign Affairs | Joseph Maria von Radowitz (Acting) | 6 November 1879 | 17 April 1880 | Independent |
| State Secretary for Foreign Affairs | Chlodwig zu Hohenlohe-Schillingsfürst (Acting) | 20 April 1880 | 1 September 1880 | Independent |
| State Secretary for Foreign Affairs | Friedrich zu Limburg-Stirum (Acting) | 1 September 1880 | 25 June 1881 | DKP |
| State Secretary for Foreign Affairs | Clemens Busch (Acting) | 25 June 1881 | 16 July 1881 | Independent |
| State Secretary for Foreign Affairs | Paul von Hatzfeldt | 16 July 1881 | 24 October 1885 | Independent |
| State Secretary for Foreign Affairs | Herbert von Bismarck | 18 May 1886 | 20 March 1890 | Independent |
| State Secretary for the Interior (from 21 December 1879) | Karl von Hofmann | 21 December 1879 | 31 August 1880 | Independent |
| State Secretary for the Interior (from 21 December 1879) | Karl Heinrich von Boetticher | 1 September 1880 | 20 March 1890 | FKP |
| State Secretary for Justice (from 1 January 1877) | Heinrich von Friedberg | 21 December 1876 | 30 October 1879 | Independent |
| State Secretary for Justice (from 1 January 1877) | Hermann von Schelling | 19 November 1879 | 31 January 1889 | Independent |
| State Secretary for Justice (from 1 January 1877) | Otto von Oehlschläger | 19 February 1889 | 20 March 1890 | Independent |
| State Secretary for the Navy | Karl Eduard Heusner | 1 April 1889 | 20 March 1890 | Independent |
| State Secretary for the Post (from 1880) | Heinrich von Stephan | 23 February 1880 | 20 March 1890 | Independent |
| State Secretary for the Treasury (from 1880) | Adolf von Scholz | 1880 | July 1882 | DKP |
| State Secretary for the Treasury (from 1880) | Franz Emil Emanuel von Burchard | 1882 | November 1886 | Independent |
| State Secretary for the Treasury (from 1880) | Karl Rudolf Jacobi | 1886 | 14 September 1888 | Independent |
| State Secretary for the Treasury (from 1880) | Helmuth von Maltzahn | 1888 | 20 March 1890 | DKP |

== Sources ==
- Regenten und Regierungen der Welt, Vol. 2,3. Neueste Zeit: 1492–1917, ed. by B. Spuler; 2nd edition, Würzburg, Ploetz, 1962.
