= First Wirth cabinet =

1921 cabinet of Weimar Germany

First Cabinet of Joseph Wirth
- 5th Cabinet of Weimar Germany
- 10 May 1921 – 22 October 1921 (until 26 October 1921 as caretaker government)
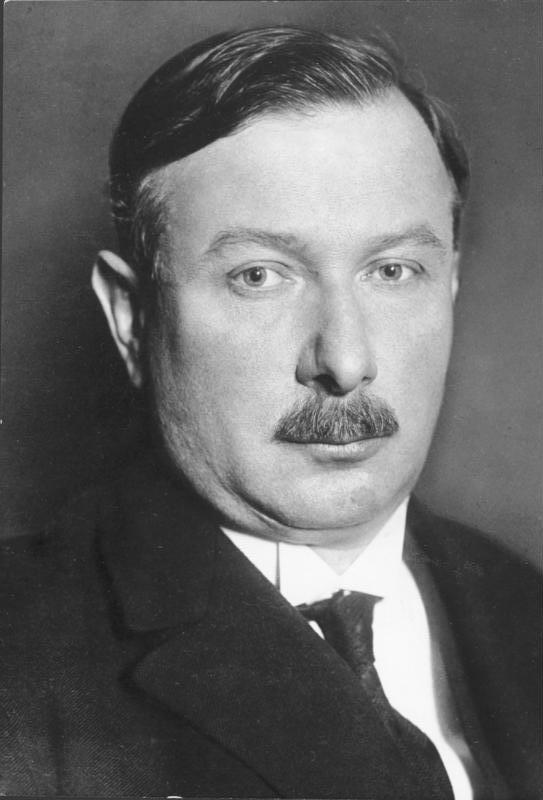
- Chancellor Joseph Wirth
- Date formed: 10 May 1921
- Date dissolved: 26 October 1921 (5 months and 16 days)

People and organisations
- President: Friedrich Ebert
- Chancellor: Joseph Wirth
- Vice-Chancellor: Gustav Bauer
- Member parties: Centre Party; Social Democratic Party; German Democratic Party
- Status in legislature: Minority Weimar Coalition (Note: Status after the 20 February 1921 elections in East Prussia and Schleswig-Holstein, but before the 19 November 1922 election in Oppeln, Silesia.)
- Opposition parties: Independent Social Democratic Party; German National People's Party; Communist Party of Germany

History
- Election: 1920 federal election
- Legislature term: 1st Reichstag of the Weimar Republic
- Predecessor: Fehrenbach cabinet
- Successor: Second Wirth cabinet

The first Wirth cabinet, headed by Chancellor Joseph Wirth of the Centre Party, was the fifth democratically elected government of the Weimar Republic. On 10 May 1921, it replaced the Fehrenbach cabinet, which had resigned as a result of differing opinions among its members over the payment of war reparations to the Allied powers. It was based on the Weimar Coalition made up of the Social Democratic Party (SPD), the Centre Party and the German Democratic Party (DDP).

The cabinet won the Reichstag's approval for the Allies' reparations demands and began the war crimes trials required by the Treaty of Versailles. It resigned on 22 October 1921 in protest over the partition of Silesia by the League of Nations following the Upper Silesia plebiscite. The cabinet stayed on as a caretaker government until it was replaced on 26 October by a second cabinet led by Wirth.

== Establishment and London Ultimatum ==
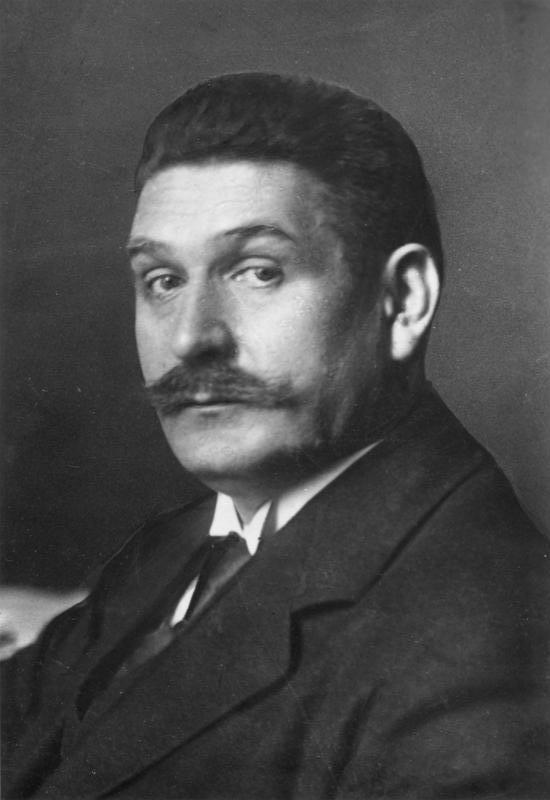
Gustav Bauer (SPD), Vice-Chancellor and Minister of the Treasury

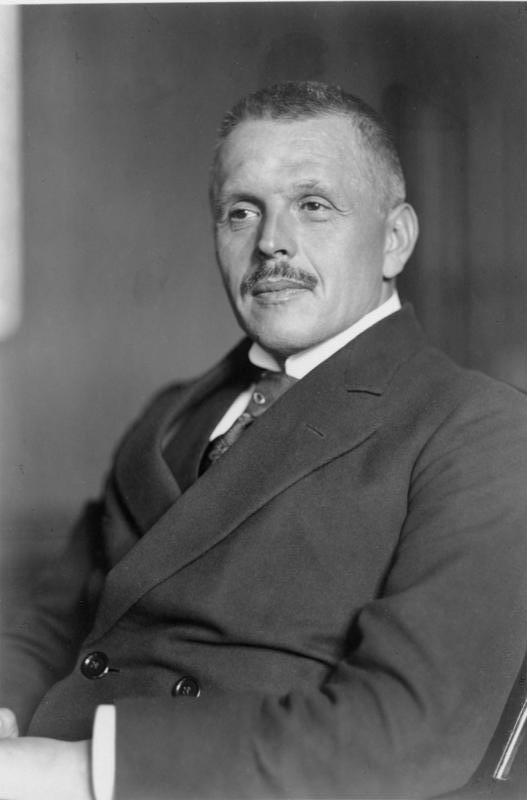
Otto Gessler (DDP), Reichswehr Minister

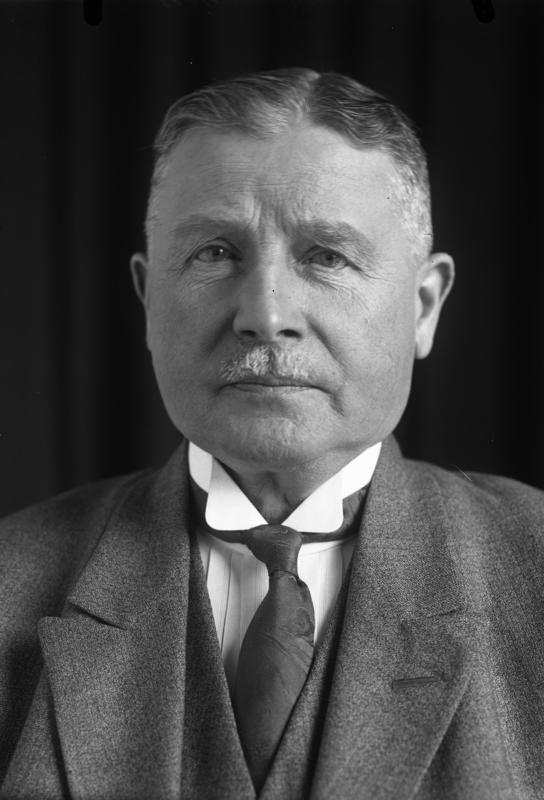
Wilhelm Groener (Ind.), Minister of Transport

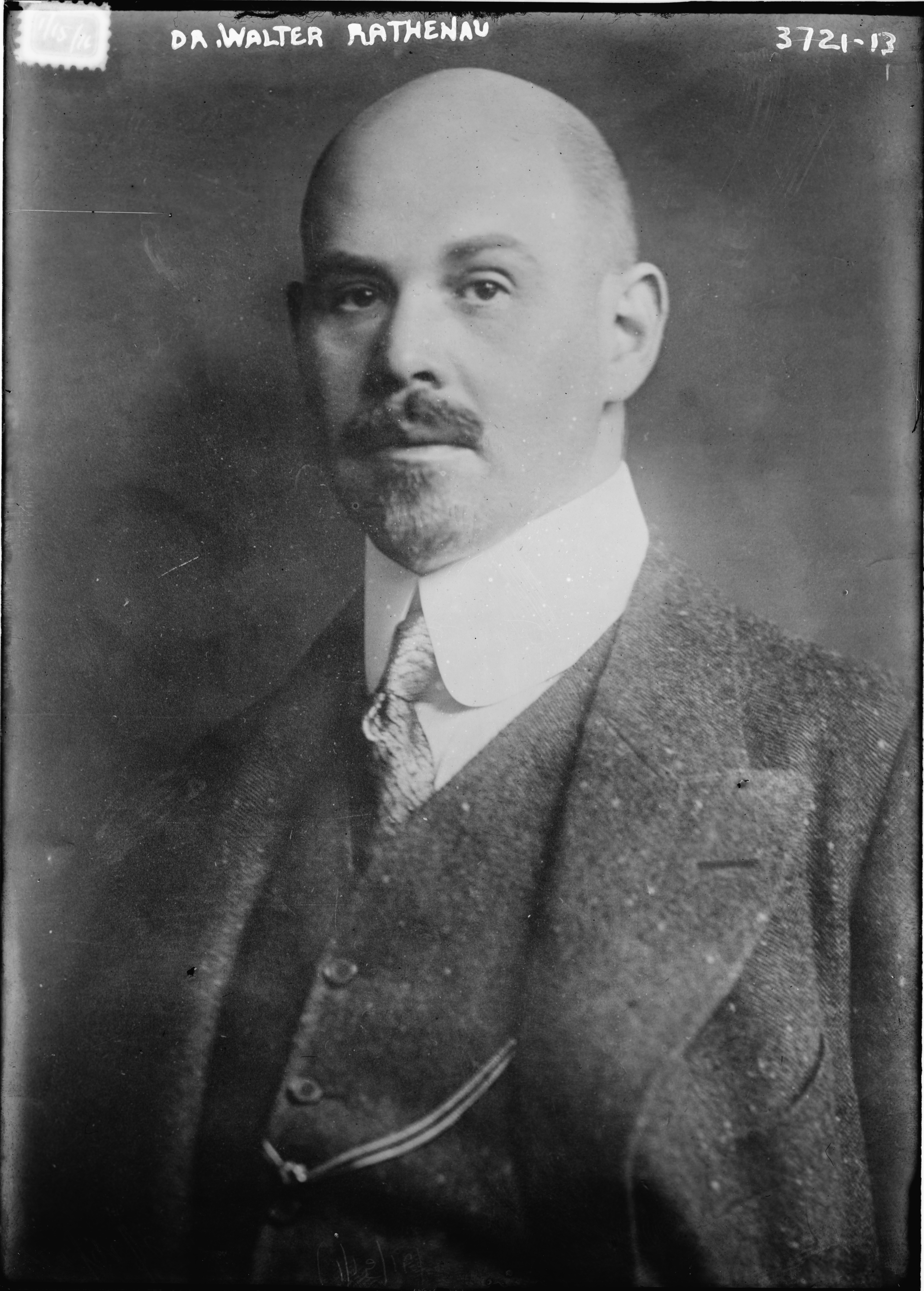
Walther Rathenau (DDP), Minister for Reconstruction

Joseph Wirth was minister of Finance under Chancellor Constantin Fehrenbach, whose cabinet resigned on the evening of 4 May 1921 due to its inability to agree on a new proposal for the payment of war reparations to present to the Allies. On 5 May, the Allies issued what became known as the London Ultimatum, which demanded that by 11 May the German government accept the war reparations schedule and its total sum, punctually comply with disarmament according to the Treaty of Versailles and initiate trials of German war criminals. In the case of non-compliance, the Allies would occupy the whole Ruhr, Germany's industrial heartland. This would be in addition to measures already announced: the occupation of Düsseldorf, Duisburg and Ruhrort as well as financial sanctions in the form of a levy on German exports.

It took the German parties until 10 May to decide on their positions towards the ultimatum. The left-wing Independent Social Democrats (USPD), the SPD and Centre Party favoured acceptance. The DDP was split and left the decision to its Reichstag delegates. Attempts by the SPD to win the USPD for a coalition failed because the latter refused to cooperate with the Centre Party. The Centre, readier than the SPD to accept the stipulations of the ultimatum, then tried to form a government including both the DVP and the SPD. Since the DVP had voted against the ultimatum, a consensus proved impossible. Among those discussed as possible chancellors were Gustav Bauer and Paul Löbe (both SPD), and Konrad Adenauer and Joseph Wirth (both Centre Party).

On the evening of 10 May, Wirth was able to present his new (if incomplete) cabinet. The Foreign Ministry, the Ministry of Finance and the Ministry for Reconstruction were still vacant, with the former two temporarily led by Wirth. He issued a government statement that endorsed acceptance of the ultimatum. The Reichstag then voted 220 to 172 (with one abstention) in favour. On the night of 10/11 May, a note signed by Wirth stating the government's acceptance went out to the German embassies at London, Paris, Rome, Brussels and Tokyo.

The government was based on parties that did not have a majority in the Reichstag (only 216 of 469 delegates were members of the three Weimar Coalition parties). However, a policy of compliance with Allied demands found the support of the USPD on the left. On the right, some DVP delegates voted to accept the ultimatum, signalling some support from that quarter as well.

== Members ==
The members of the cabinet were as follows:

Portfolio	Minister	Took office	Left office	Party
Chancellorship	Joseph Wirth	10 May 1921	26 October 1921	Centre
Vice-Chancellorship	Gustav Bauer	10 May 1921	26 October 1921	SPD
Foreign Affairs	Joseph Wirth	10 May 1921	22 May 1921	Centre
Foreign Affairs	Friedrich Rosen	23 May 1921	26 October 1921	Independent
Interior	Georg Gradnauer	10 May 1921	26 October 1921	SPD
Justice	Eugen Schiffer	10 May 1921	26 October 1921	DDP
Labour	Heinrich Brauns	10 May 1921	26 October 1921	Centre
Reichswehr	Otto Gessler	10 May 1921	26 October 1921	DDP
Economic Affairs	Robert Schmidt	10 May 1921	26 October 1921	SPD
Finance	Joseph Wirth	10 May 1921	26 October 1921	Centre
Treasury	Gustav Bauer	10 May 1921	26 October 1921	SPD
Food and Agriculture	Andreas Hermes	10 May 1921	26 October 1921	Centre
Transport	Wilhelm Groener	10 May 1921	26 October 1921	Independent
Postal affairs	Johannes Giesberts	10 May 1921	26 October 1921	Centre
Reconstruction	Vacant	10 May 1921	28 May 1921	
Reconstruction	Walther Rathenau	29 May 1921	22 October 1921	DDP

== In office ==
The first Wirth government continued to take steps to comply with the Treaty of Versailles. Article 229 stated that "persons guilty of criminal acts against the nationals of one of the Allied and Associated Powers will be brought before the military tribunals of that Power". In 1920 it was agreed that the accused be tried before the German High Court in Leipzig. The first trial, that of Karl Heynen, the warden of a prisoner of war camp, began on 23 May 1921. He was found guilty and sentenced to ten months in prison.

Under the requirements of Article 88 of the Treaty of Versailles, the population of the ethnically mixed region of Upper Silesia held a referendum on 20 March 1921 to decide whether they wanted to remain in Germany or become part of the newly founded Second Polish Republic. Sixty per cent of the voters opted to stay in Germany. The election results led Polish insurgents to start the Third Silesian Uprising, which was resisted by local Freikorps units. On 20 October, under a recommendation of the League of Nations, about a third of Upper Silesia's territory, half of the population and around 80% of its heavy industry were awarded to Poland. The decision raised a storm of protest in Germany.

== Resignation ==
On 22 October 1921, the first Wirth cabinet resigned in protest over the partition of Upper Silesia. Three days later, President Friedrich Ebert asked Wirth to form a new government, this time without the DDP. The first Wirth cabinet was succeeded on 26 October 1921 by his second cabinet.
