= Fehrenbach cabinet =

1920–21 cabinet of Weimar Germany

Cabinet of Constantin Fehrenbach
- 4th Cabinet of Weimar Germany
- 25 June 1920 – 4 May 1921 (until 10 May 1921 as caretaker government)
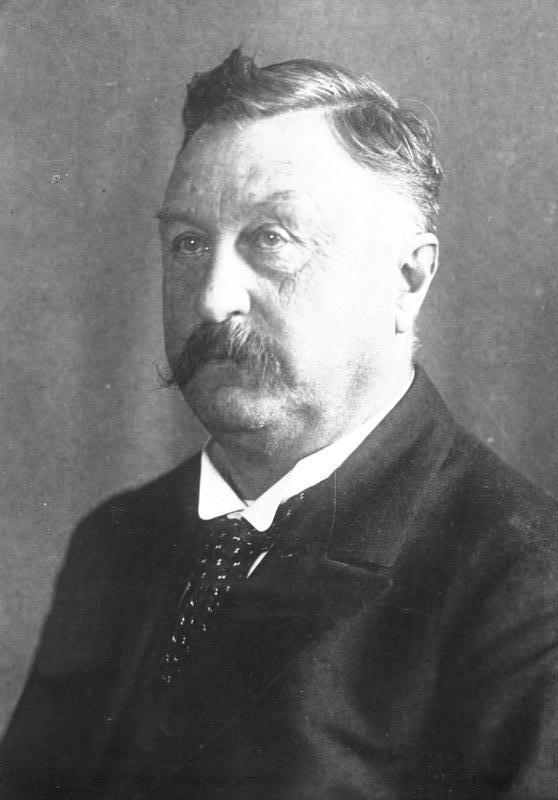
- Chancellor Constantin Fehrenbach
- Date formed: 25 June 1920
- Date dissolved: 10 May 1921 (10 months and 15 days)

People and organisations
- President: Friedrich Ebert
- Chancellor: Constantin Fehrenbach
- Vice-Chancellor: Rudolf Heinze
- Member parties: Centre Party; German People's Party; German Democratic Party
- Status in legislature: Minority coalition government (Note: Status after the 20 February 1921 elections in East Prussia and Schleswig-Holstein)
- Opposition parties: Independent Social Democratic Party; German National People's Party; Communist Party of Germany

History
- Election: 1920 federal election
- Legislature term: 1st Reichstag of the Weimar Republic
- Predecessor: First Müller cabinet
- Successor: First Wirth cabinet

The Fehrenbach cabinet, headed by Chancellor Constantin Fehrenbach of the Centre Party, was the fourth democratically elected government of the Weimar Republic. It took office on 25 June 1920 when it replaced the first cabinet of Hermann Müller, which had resigned due to the poor showing of the coalition parties in the June 1920 elections to the new Reichstag. The 1920 Reichstag replaced the Weimar National Assembly, which had served as Germany's interim parliament and written and approved the Weimar Constitution.

Fehrenbach's government was the first since the fall of the German Empire in 1918 that did not include the Social Democratic Party of Germany (SPD). The SPD remained the strongest party after the elections, but its share of the vote had dropped significantly. The government was formed by the Centre Party, the German Democratic Party (DDP) and the German People's Party (DVP).

The dominant issues that the cabinet faced were uprisings in Saxony and Upper Silesia and negotiations over Germany's war reparations to the Allies of World War I, the failure of which led to the French occupation of three cities in the Ruhr.

Fehrenbach resigned on 4 May 1921 over his government's inability to find common ground on war reparations. The cabinet remained in office on a caretaker basis until 10 May, when it was replaced by the first cabinet of Joseph Wirth, the Centre Party minister of Finance under Fehrenbach.

== Election and establishment ==
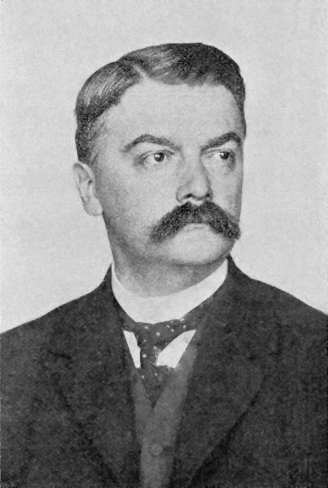
Rudolf Heinze (DVP), Vice-Chancellor and Minister of Justice

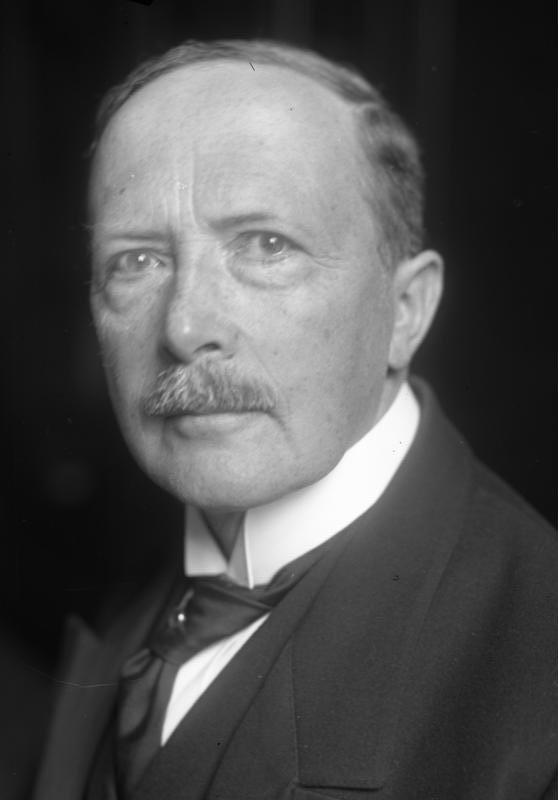
Walter Simons (Ind.), Foreign Minister

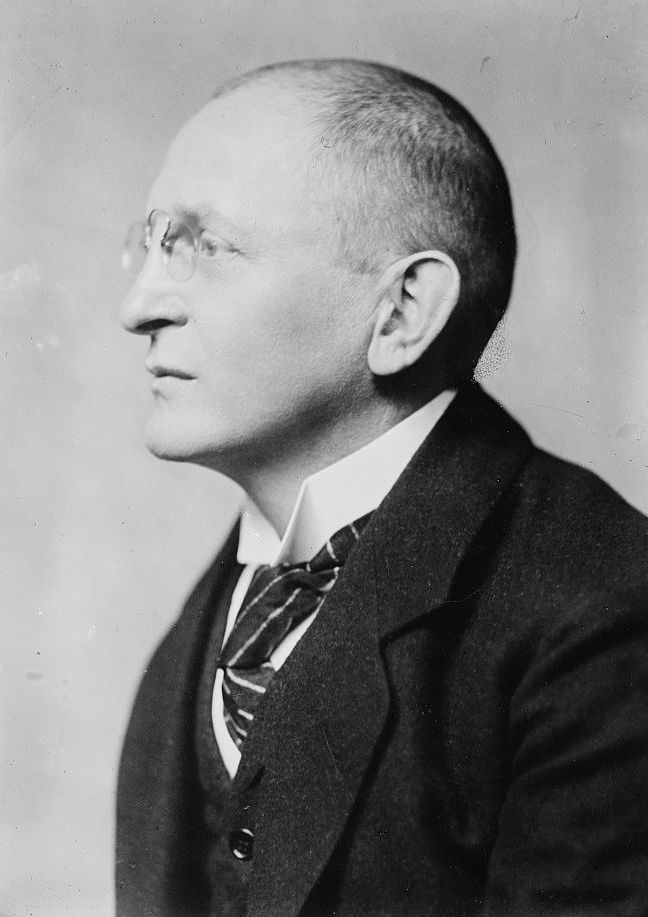
Erich Koch-Weser (DDP), Minister of the Interior

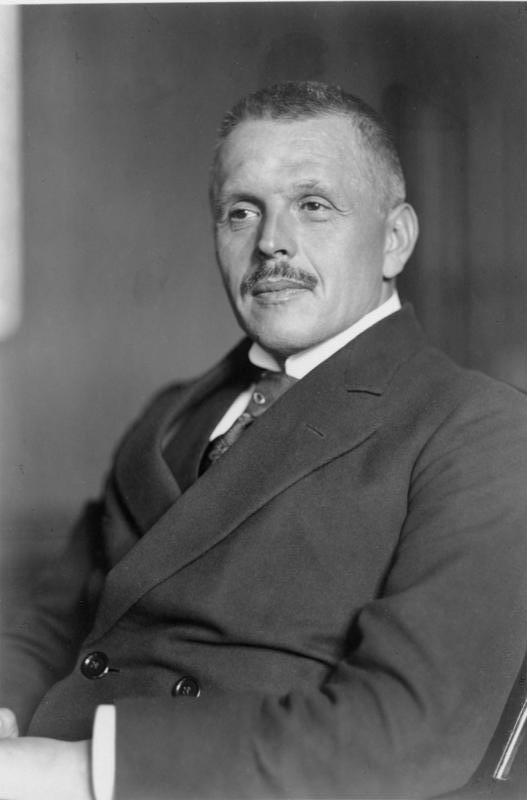
Otto Gessler, (DDP) Reichswehr Minister

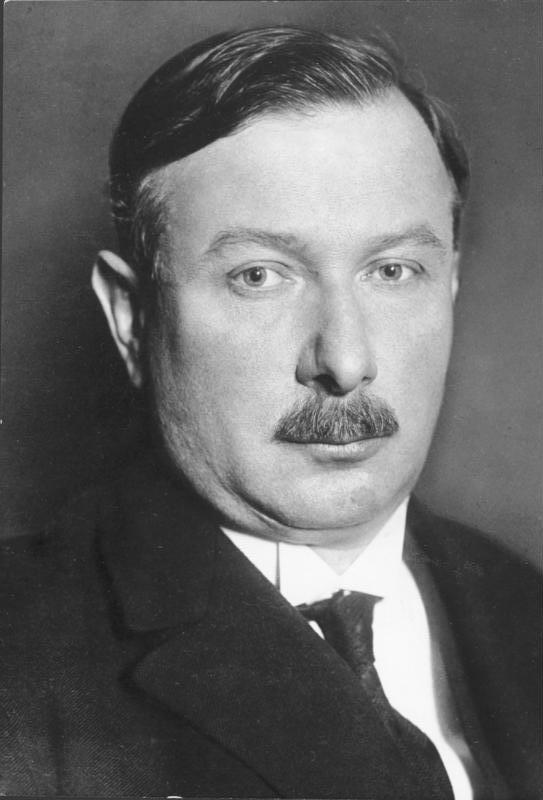
Joseph Wirth (Centre), Minister of Finance

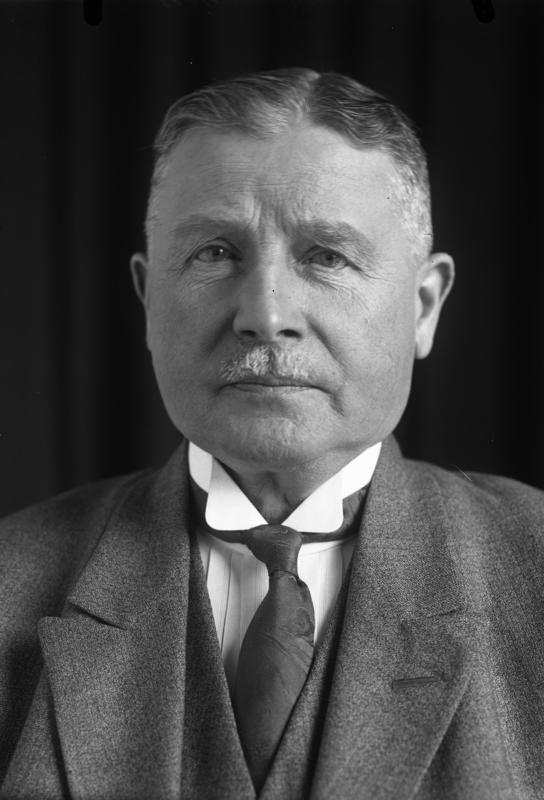
Wilhelm Groener (Ind.), Transport Minister

The Reichstag elections of 6 June 1920 brought a defeat for the Weimar Coalition, the three parties that had carried the previous government – SPD, DDP and Centre. Their share of the popular vote dropped from 74.8% in the January 1919 election to 43.6%. Gains were made both by the parties on the right – the DVP and German National People's Party (DNVP) – and the far left – the Independent Social Democratic Party (USPD) and the Communist Party of Germany (KPD). Nationalist voters blamed the Weimar Coalition for the lost war, for accepting the severe terms of the Treaty of Versailles and for domestic unrest by workers, such as during the Ruhr uprising. Those on the left felt betrayed by the SPD and the other parties of the political centre for siding with the military and other forces that had been powerful under the Empire (the bureaucracy, industrialists and land owners) against communist or socialist protests.

Since the SPD, Centre and DDP had only 225 of the 466 Reichstag seats, the old coalition lacked a majority. In addition, the elections had not taken place in Schleswig-Holstein, Upper Silesia, East Prussia and West Prussia due to the plebiscites scheduled there to decide whether the regions would remain part of Germany. The 42 sitting delegates for the districts temporarily retained their seats until elections could be held after the plebiscites. The elections in East Prussia and Schleswig-Holstein took place on 20 February 1921 and resulted in the three Weimar Coalition parties losing a total of nine more seats. (The last of the 3 elections for the first Reichstag took place on 19 November 1922, when the Fehrenbach cabinet was out of office.)

On 8 June, the first Müller cabinet offered to resign. President Friedrich Ebert accepted but asked the ministers to remain in office until a replacement cabinet could be formed. Since the old coalition had insufficient Reichstag support and the left-wing and right-wing parties would not cooperate, the only solution seemed to be to expand the existing coalition to the left or right. Also on 8 June, an article published in the SPD party newspaper Vorwärts and viewed as reflecting the party's official stance, categorically refused cooperation with the DVP and called on the USDP to drop its most radical demands, thereby making a centre-left coalition that included it possible.

The Centre Party favoured maintaining the old coalition but was open to the inclusion of the DVP. The DDP and DVP, as the smaller partners in any coalition, were passive. Both saw working with the SPD as unavoidable. On 11 June, Ebert, following the tradition of approaching the strongest party first, asked Hermann Müller, the caretaker chancellor, to form a new cabinet. Müller contacted Arthur Crispien of the USDP to negotiate entry of the far-left party into the existing coalition. Crispien refused and Müller handed back the task of forming a government on 12 June.

Since the next two parties in terms of the share of the vote were the USPD and DNVP and they occupied extreme positions in the political spectrum that made it unlikely that they would be able to form a government, Ebert on 13 June turned to Rudolf Heinze of the DVP. Heinze met with SPD representatives and was refused. He then handed back the task of forming a cabinet.

On 14 June, Ebert asked Karl Trimborn (Centre), who accepted but apparently signalled that he might be working only as a negotiator. Trimborn managed to gain the SPD's acceptance of a minority government made up of the Centre Party, DDP and DVP that the Social Democrats would support until the July Spa conference between representatives of the German government and the Allied Supreme War Council. After that date, further cooperation between the SPD and the government would depend on its actions. Both the DDP and DVP agreed in principle to such an arrangement and on 14 June, Constantin Fehrenbach was named as possible chancellor. In a conversation between Ebert and Fehrenbach on 15 June, the latter said he did not feel up to the job and suggested Wilhelm Mayer instead. Mayer refused on 16 June, and on 17 June, Ebert asked Fehrenbach to form a cabinet.

Disagreements between the DDP and DVP further delayed proceedings, but on 21 June 1920, Fehrenbach was appointed chancellor. Problems with the DVP over appointments held matters up for several more days, since the "industrialist" wing of the party objected to Joseph Wirth as minister of Finance and made other demands. By threatening to resign, Fehrenbach succeeded in having the demands withdrawn. On 25 June 1920, the cabinet was officially formed.

The Ministry for Reconstruction was not assigned a minister but was represented in the cabinet by a state secretary. In the final cabinet list, there were four ministers (plus the chancellor) from the Centre Party, three DVP ministers, two from the DDP and two independents.

== Members ==
The members of the cabinet were as follows:

Portfolio	Minister	Took office	Left office	Party
Chancellorship	Constantin Fehrenbach	25 June 1920	10 May 1921	Centre
Vice-Chancellorship	Rudolf Heinze	25 June 1920	10 May 1921	DVP
Foreign Affairs	Walter Simons	25 June 1920	10 May 1921	Independent
Interior	Erich Koch-Weser	25 June 1920	10 May 1921	DDP
Justice	Rudolf Heinze	25 June 1920	10 May 1921	DVP
Labour	Heinrich Brauns	25 June 1920	10 May 1921	Centre
Reichswehr	Otto Gessler	25 June 1920	10 May 1921	DDP
Economic Affairs	Ernst Scholz	25 June 1920	10 May 1921	DVP
Finance	Joseph Wirth	25 June 1920	10 May 1921	Centre
Treasury	Hans von Raumer	25 June 1920	10 May 1921	DVP
Food and Agriculture	Andreas Hermes	25 June 1920	10 May 1921	Centre
Transport	Wilhelm Groener	25 June 1920	10 May 1921	Independent
Postal affairs	Johannes Giesberts	25 June 1920	10 May 1921	Centre
Reconstruction	Vacant	–	–	–

== In office ==
In late March 1921, a communist-led revolt known as the March action broke out in Saxony and Hamburg. President Ebert declared a state of emergency for the two regions based on Article 48 of the Weimar Constitution. The uprising was put down quickly and bloodily by government troops.

Two plebiscites called for by the Treaty of Versailles took place under the Fehrenbach government, the 1920 East Prussian plebiscite and the 1921 Upper Silesia plebiscite. In East Prussia and West Prussia, 95% voted in favour of remaining in Germany rather than becoming part of the Second Polish Republic. In Upper Silesia, where the result was almost 60% for staying part of Germany, the Polish population of the region staged the third Silesian uprising in protest of the plebiscite's results.

The matter of war reparations was the dominant issue during the whole tenure of the cabinet. At the Spa Conference in July 1920, Germany took part for the first time in negotiations with the Allies over issues of disarmament and reparations. The following January, at the Paris Conference, Germany's total reparations obligations were set at 226 billion gold marks. Germany rejected the amount, and at the ensuing London Conference (1921) in March, Foreign Minister Walter Simons again refused to accept the Allied demands. German attempts to get the United States government to mediate between the German position and those of the French and British governments were unsuccessful. Simons left the conference, and a day later, France occupied Ruhrort, Duisburg and Düsseldorf.

== Resignation ==
The failure of the London Conference put a heavy strain on the coalition on which the government was based, with the DVP arguing that they could not support the policies of Foreign Minister Walter Simons any longer. The DVP opposed making any counterproposal on reparations that could have been acceptable to the Allies. The end of the cabinet was finally brought about by the London ultimatum. By late April/early May, there were rumours that the Allies were about to present a new payments schedule in connection with threats of new sanctions (as happened on 5 May). On 4 May, despite the uprising in Upper Silesia that had erupted the previous day, the cabinet decided to resign after the parties were unable to agree on whether to present the Allies with a new German proposal on reparations. President Ebert asked the government to remain in office until a new one could be formed, and the cabinet agreed. It was succeeded on 10 May 1921 by the first cabinet of Joseph Wirth (Centre Party), the minister of Finance under Fehrenbach.
