= Second Wirth cabinet =

1921–1922 cabinet of Weimar Germany

Second Cabinet of Joseph Wirth
- 6th Cabinet of Weimar Germany
- 26 October 1921 – 14 November 1922 (until 22 November 1922 as caretaker government)
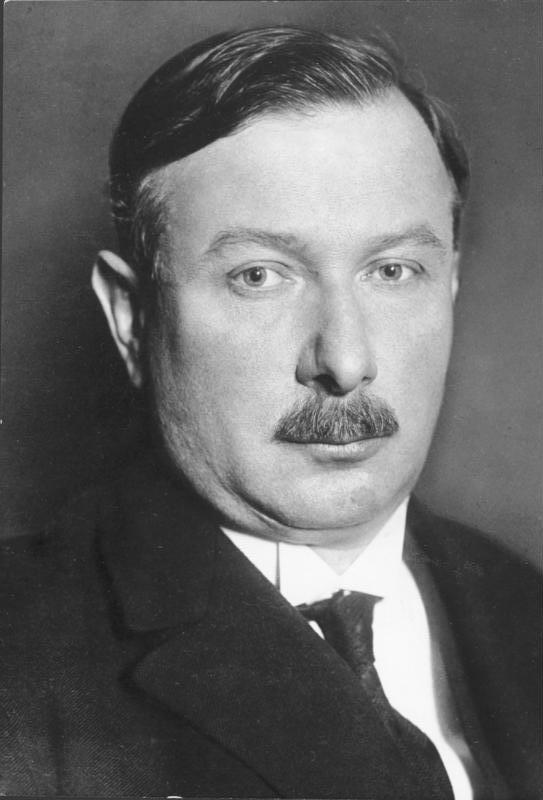
- Chancellor Joseph Wirth
- Date formed: 26 October 1921
- Date dissolved: 22 November 1922 (1 year and 27 days)

People and organisations
- President: Friedrich Ebert
- Chancellor: Joseph Wirth
- Vice Chancellor: Gustav Bauer
- Member parties: Centre Party; Social Democratic Party; German Democratic Party
- Status in legislature: Minority Weimar Coalition (Note: Until the SPD / USPD merger on 24 September 1922. Numbers include the results of the delayed elections in East Prussia and Schleswig-Holstein on 20 February 1921.); Majority Weimar Coalition (Note: Following the SPD / USPD merger on 24 September 1922 and including the East Prussian and Schleswig-Holstein results)
- Opposition parties: Independent Social Democratic Party (Note: Until the SPD / USPD merger on 24 September 1922); German National People's Party; German People's Party

History
- Election: 1920 federal election
- Legislature term: 1st Reichstag of the Weimar Republic
- Predecessor: First Wirth cabinet
- Successor: Cuno cabinet

The second Wirth cabinet, headed by Joseph Wirth of the Centre Party, was the sixth democratically elected government of the Weimar Republic. It assumed office on 26 October 1921 when it replaced the first Wirth cabinet, which resigned in protest after the industrially important eastern part of Upper Silesia was awarded to Poland even though the majority of its inhabitants had voted in a plebiscite to remain part of Germany.

The cabinet was based initially on a coalition of the Centre Party and the Social Democratic Party (SPD) and was later joined by the German Democratic Party (DDP). The three-party grouping was known as the Weimar Coalition.

The Wirth government won an important moratorium on war reparations payments from the Allied powers. In July 1922, Foreign Minister Walther Rathenau was assassinated by right-wing extremists after he had signed the Rapallo Treaty normalising relations with Soviet Russia. The assassination shocked the nation and led to the passing of a law that prohibited organisations opposed to the republican form of government.

The second Wirth cabinet resigned on 14 November 1922 after it lost a key vote in the Reichstag and then failed in an attempt to restructure the coalition. It was replaced on 22 November by the Cuno cabinet led by Wilhelm Cuno, an independent.

== Establishment ==
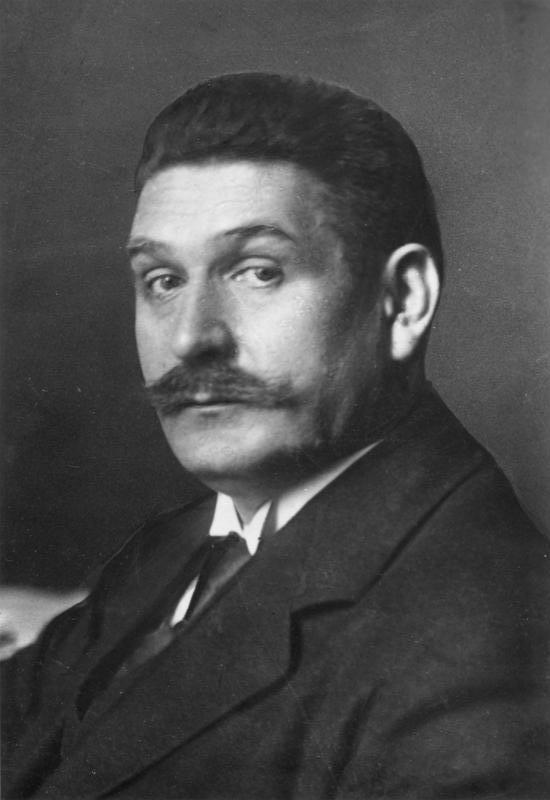
Gustav Bauer (SPD), Vice-Chancellor and Minister of the Treasury

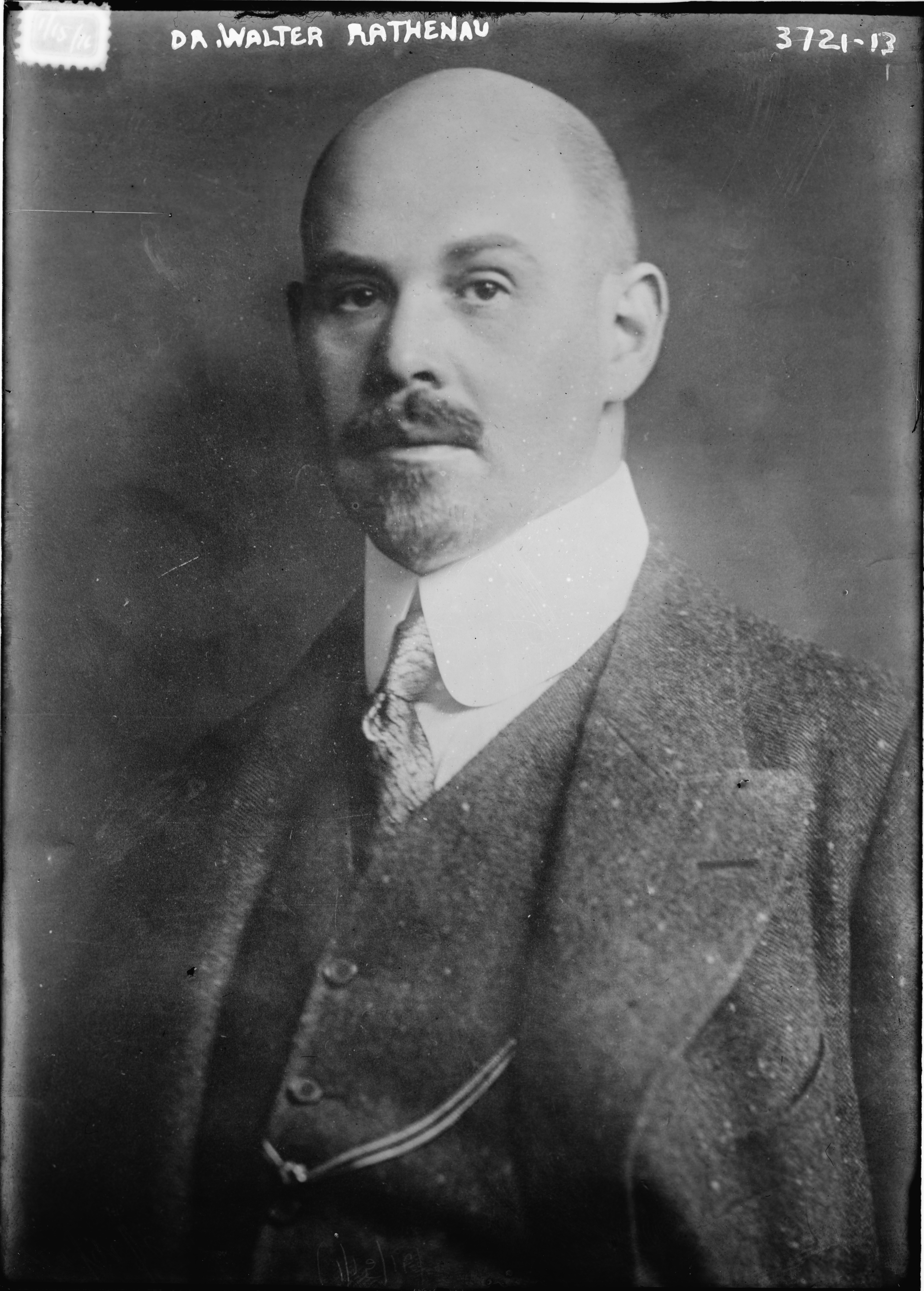
Walther Rathenau (DDP), Foreign Minister. He was assassinated while in office.

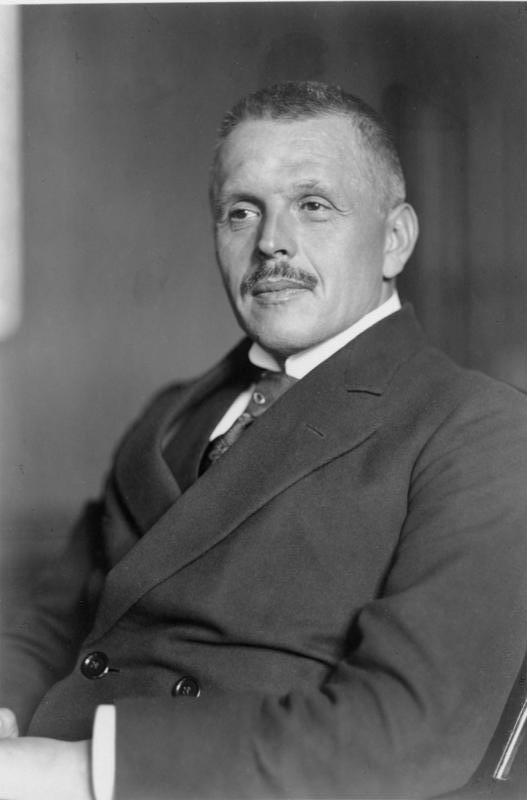
Otto Gessler (DDP), Reichswehr Minister

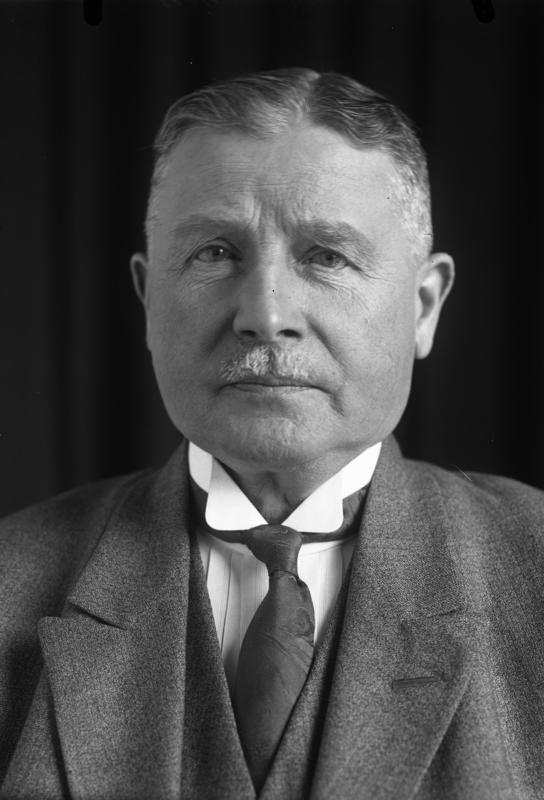
Wilhelm Groener (Ind.), Minister of Transport

Wirth's first government resigned on 22 October 1921 in protest over the partitioning of Upper Silesia by the League of Nations. German President Friedrich Ebert (SPD) asked Joseph Wirth to form a new cabinet on 25 October. Ebert noted that attempts to form a "grand coalition", i.e., including the German Democratic Party (DDP) and/or the German People's Party (DVP) on 23 to 25 October seemed to have failed. Both parties refused to accept the partition of Silesia or to join any coalition that agreed to it. The SPD and Centre Party then decided to form a minority government. On 26 October, Wirth gave a government statement in which he presented his new cabinet as a combination of individuals, not as members of a coalition. Wirth was in charge of the Foreign Office, Andreas Hermes (Centre) became acting Finance minister, and the minister for Reconstruction position remained unfilled. The arrangement left three positions to offer in case of a later increase in the size of the coalition. Otto Gessler (DDP) remained on as Reichswehr minister.

Hopes to add the DVP to the government were disappointed after Wirth angered them by appointing Walther Rathenau of the DDP as foreign minister at the end of January. After Rathenau was assassinated by right-wing extremists on 24 June, Wirth resumed the position at the Foreign Office. After Andreas Hermes became minister of Finance and Anton Fehr of the Bavarian Peasants' League (BB) replaced him at the Ministry of Food and Agriculture in March 1922, only the post of minister for Reconstruction was left as a potential prize for an additional party. It remained vacant.

== Members ==
The members of the cabinet were as follows:

Portfolio	Minister	Took office	Left office	Party
Chancellorship	Joseph Wirth	26 October 1921	22 November 1922	Centre
Vice-Chancellorship	Gustav Bauer	26 October 1921	22 November 1922	SPD
Foreign Affairs	Joseph Wirth	26 October 1921	31 January 1922	Centre
Foreign Affairs	Walther Rathenau	1 February 1922	22 June 1922	DDP
Foreign Affairs	Joseph Wirth	24 June 1922	22 November 1922	Centre
Interior	Adolf Köster	26 October 1921	22 November 1922	SPD
Justice	Gustav Radbruch	26 October 1921	22 November 1922	SPD
Labour	Heinrich Brauns	26 October 1921	22 November 1922	Centre
Reichswehr	Otto Gessler	26 October 1921	22 November 1922	DDP
Economic Affairs	Robert Schmidt	26 October 1921	22 November 1922	SPD
Finance	Andreas Hermes	26 October 1921	22 November 1922	Centre
Treasury	Gustav Bauer	26 October 1921	22 November 1922	SPD
Food and Agriculture	Andreas Hermes	26 October 1921	30 March 1922	Centre
Food and Agriculture	Anton Fehr	31 March 1922	22 November 1922	BB
Transport	Wilhelm Groener	26 October 1921	22 November 1922	Independent
Postal affairs	Johannes Giesberts	26 October 1921	22 November 1922	Centre
Reconstruction	Vacant	–	–	–

== Reparations and the Treaty of Rapallo ==
Confronted with the 132 billion gold marks in reparations payments demanded by the Allies of World War I, Wirth tried to have the total amount lowered through a policy of "fulfilment". By attempting to meet the payments, he intended to show the Allies that the demands were beyond Germany's economic means. In December 1921, Germany told the Allied Reparation Commission that its economic situation would prevent it from paying the reparations that were due in January and February 1922. The January reparations conference at Cannes agreed to let Germany temporarily suspend payments, and in May, the Reparation Commission granted a suspension of payments until the end of the year. In spite of the moratorium, the German mark dropped to 650 marks to the American dollar by July 29.

On 16 April, Foreign Minister Walther Rathenau signed the Treaty of Rapallo with Soviet Russia. The two countries re-established diplomatic relations and renounced territorial and financial claims against one another. Rathenau was assassinated by members of the extreme nationalist and antisemitic Organisation Consul on 24 June. In response to the assassination, the Reichstag enacted the Law for the Protection of the Republic. It increased the punishments for politically motivated acts of violence and banned organisations that opposed the constitutional republican form of government, along with their printed material and meetings.

== Resignation ==
In a speech in front of the Reichstag on 25 June 1922, following the assassination of Walther Rathenau, Wirth turned toward the right-wing members and declared, "There stands the enemy who drips his poison into the wounds of a people. There stands the enemy, and there is no doubt about it: The enemy stands on the right!" After the speech, it proved impossible to build a coalition that included parties ranging from the conservative DVP to the socialist SPD, which had gained 83 additional seats on 24 September when it reunited with the Independent Social Democratic Party of Germany (USPD). When Wirth's government lost a key vote on the grain levy and President Ebert asked him to restructure his cabinet, he was unable to do so. Vice-chancellor Gustav Bauer, speaking for the SPD, rejected being in a coalition with the DVP, as the DDP and Centre wished, and urged the government's resignation. The cabinet agreed on 14 November and, following a short caretaker period, was replaced on 22 November 1922 by the Cuno cabinet, led by the independent Wilhelm Cuno.
