= Hertling cabinet =

1917–18 cabinet of the German Empire

Cabinet of Georg von Hertling
- 7th Cabinet of the German Empire
- 1917 – 1918
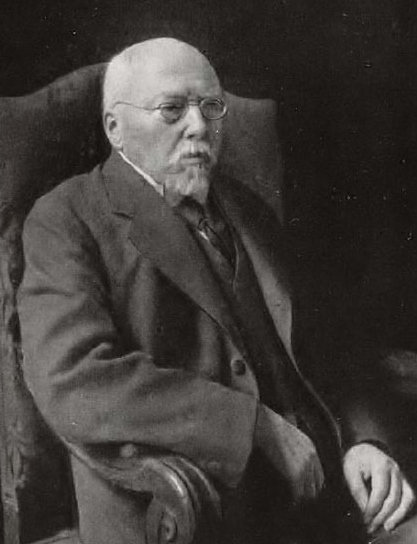
- Chancellor Georg von Hertling
- Date formed: 1 November 1917
- Date dissolved: 3 October 1918 (11 months and 2 days)

People and organisations
- Emperor: Wilhelm II
- Chancellor: Georg von Hertling
- Vice Chancellor: Karl Helfferich (until 24 October 1917); Friedrich von Payer (from 9 November 1917)
- Member parties: Supported by: Social Democratic Party; Centre Party; National Liberal Party; Progressive People's Party
- Status in legislature: Majority government

History
- Election: 1912 federal election
- Legislature term: 13th Reichstag of the German Empire
- Predecessor: Michaelis cabinet
- Successor: Baden cabinet

The Hertling cabinet, headed by Georg von Hertling of the Centre Party, was the seventh government of the German Empire and the first that had come about after consulting with the majority parties in the Reichstag. The cabinet took office on 1 November 1917 when it replaced the Michaelis cabinet, which had been dismissed after losing the support of Emperor Wilhelm II and most parties in the Reichstag.

Hertling belonged to the right wing of the Catholic Centre Party, and was against a parliamentarisation of the German Empire. The left wing around Matthias Erzberger took the opposite view, and the broad centre of the party wanted to take into account the views of the right wing, but also took note of the wishes of Catholic workers for democratisation. The Centre did not want to put obstacles in the way of parliamentarisation, but did not take active steps to prevent a split in the party. Hertling's chancellorship meant that the Centre and the left Liberals took account of the conservative elements. The latter could thus get used to a parliamentary way of governing.

The Social Democrats did not join the cabinet, not wanting to render the process of forming a government even more difficult. However, they supported the cabinet in parliament.

== Members ==
The cabinet consisted of the following ministers:

Portfolio	Minister	Took office	Left office	Party
Chancellorship	Georg von Hertling	1 November 1917	3 October 1918	Centre
Vice-Chancellorship	Karl Helfferich	1 November 1917	24 October 1918	Independent
Vice-Chancellorship	Friedrich von Payer	9 November 1917	3 October 1918	FVp
Foreign Affairs	Richard von Kühlmann	1 November 1917	9 July 1918	Independent
Foreign Affairs	Paul von Hintze	9 July 1918	3 October 1918	Independent
Interior	Max Wallraf	1 November 1917	3 October 1918	Independent
Justice	Paul von Krause	1 November 1917	3 October 1918	NlP
Navy	Eduard von Capelle	1 November 1917	3 October 1918	Independent
Economic Affairs	Rudolf Schwander	1 November 1917	20 November 1917	Independent
Economic Affairs	Hans Karl von Stein zu Nord- und Ostheim	20 November 1917	3 October 1918	Independent
Food Supply	Wilhelm von Waldow	1 November 1917	3 October 1918	Independent
Postal Affairs	Otto Rüdlin	1 November 1917	3 October 1918	Independent
Treasury	Siegfried Graf von Roedern	1 November 1917	3 October 1918	Independent
Colonial Affairs	Wilhelm Solf	1 November 1917	3 October 1918	Independent
