= Fourth Merkel cabinet =

Government of Germany from 2018 to 2021

Fourth Cabinet of Angela Merkel Cabinet Merkel IV
- 23rd Cabinet of the Federal Republic of Germany
- 14 March 2018 – 26 October 2021 (until 8 December 2021 as caretaker government)
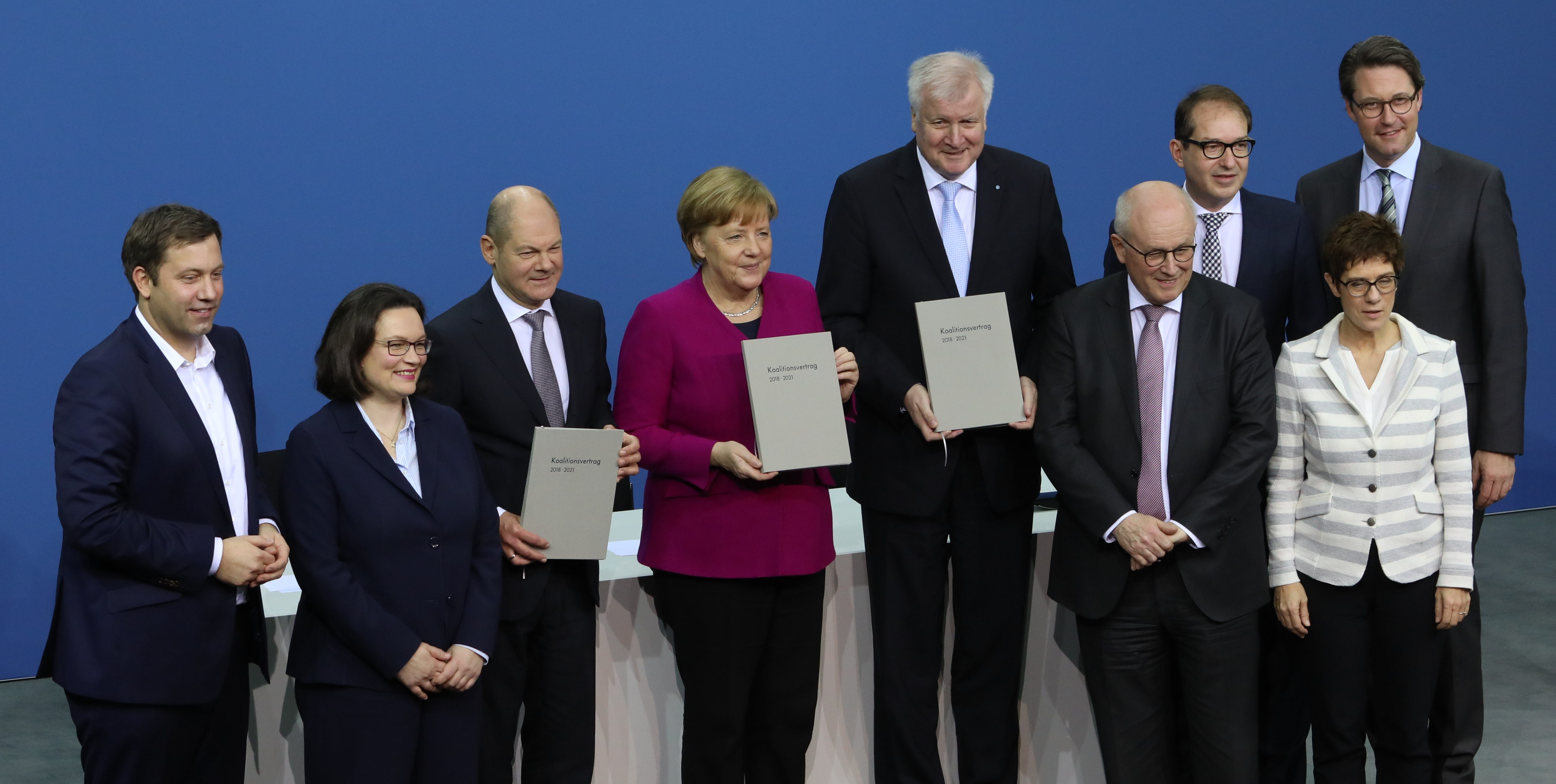
- Signing of the coalition agreement for the 19th Bundestag on 12 March 2018
- Date formed: 14 March 2018
- Date dissolved: 8 December 2021 (3 years, 8 months, 3 weeks and 3 days)

People and organisations
- President: Frank-Walter Steinmeier
- Chancellor: Angela Merkel
- Vice-Chancellor: Olaf Scholz
- Member parties: Christian Democratic Union; Social Democratic Party; Christian Social Union in Bavaria
- Status in legislature: Grand coalition
- Opposition parties: Alternative for Germany; Free Democratic Party; The Left; The Greens; Liberal Conservative Reformers (from 2020)
- Opposition leaders: Alice Weidel (AfD) & Alexander Gauland (AfD)

History
- Election: 2017 federal election
- Legislature terms: 19th Bundestag
- Predecessor: Merkel III
- Successor: Scholz

The Fourth Merkel cabinet (German: Kabinett Merkel IV) was the 23rd Government of the Federal Republic of Germany during the 19th legislative session of the Bundestag. It was sworn in on 14 March 2018 following the 2017 federal election and dismissed on 26 October 2021, acting in a caretaker mode until 8 December 2021. It was preceded by the third Merkel cabinet and succeeded by the Scholz cabinet. Led by Chancellor Angela Merkel, it was the third cabinet under Merkel to be supported by a coalition of the Christian Democratic Union (CDU), the Christian Social Union of Bavaria (CSU), and the Social Democratic Party (SPD).

== Composition ==
The cabinet consists of Chancellor Angela Merkel and fifteen (fourteen since 20 May 2021) federal ministers. Olaf Scholz (SPD) replaced Sigmar Gabriel as Vice Chancellor and CSU Leader Horst Seehofer became Federal Minister of the Interior, Building and Community. Fourteen ministers head a department (since 20 May 2021, one minister heads two departments); one member of the cabinet, the Head of the Chancellery, is Federal Minister for Special Affairs without a portfolio. The CDU has seven positions, the SPD has six and the CSU has three, as follows:

Order	Office	Portrait	Minister	Party	Took office	Left office
1	Chancellor		Angela Merkel	CDU	14 March 2018	8 December 2021
2	Vice Chancellor		Olaf Scholz	SPD	14 March 2018	8 December 2021
2	Federal Minister of Finance		Olaf Scholz	SPD	14 March 2018	8 December 2021
3	Federal Minister of the Interior, Building and Community		Horst Seehofer	CSU	14 March 2018	8 December 2021
4	Federal Minister for Foreign Affairs		Heiko Maas	SPD	14 March 2018	8 December 2021
5	Federal Minister of Economics and Energy		Peter Altmaier	CDU	14 March 2018	8 December 2021
6	Federal Minister of Justice and Consumer Protection		Katarina Barley	SPD	14 March 2018	27 June 2019
6	Federal Minister of Justice and Consumer Protection		Christine Lambrecht	SPD	27 June 2019	8 December 2021
7	Federal Minister of Labour and Social Affairs		Hubertus Heil	SPD	14 March 2018	8 December 2021
8	Federal Minister of Defence		Ursula von der Leyen	CDU	17 December 2013	17 July 2019
8	Federal Minister of Defence		Annegret Kramp-Karrenbauer	CDU	17 July 2019	8 December 2021
9	Federal Minister of Food and Agriculture		Julia Klöckner	CDU	14 March 2018	8 December 2021
10	Federal Minister for Family Affairs, Senior Citizens, Women and Youth		Franziska Giffey	SPD	14 March 2018	20 May 2021
10	Federal Minister for Family Affairs, Senior Citizens, Women and Youth		Christine Lambrecht	SPD	20 May 2021	8 December 2021
11	Federal Minister of Health		Jens Spahn	CDU	14 March 2018	8 December 2021
12	Federal Minister of Transport and Digital Infrastructure		Andreas Scheuer	CSU	14 March 2018	8 December 2021
13	Federal Minister for the Environment, Nature Conservation and Nuclear Safety		Svenja Schulze	SPD	14 March 2018	8 December 2021
14	Federal Minister of Education and Research		Anja Karliczek	CDU	14 March 2018	8 December 2021
15	Federal Minister for Economic Cooperation and Development		Gerd Müller	CSU	14 March 2018	8 December 2021
16	Federal Minister for Special Affairs & Head of the Chancellery		Helge Braun	CDU	14 March 2018	8 December 2021

== 2018 government crisis ==
In June 2018, a government crisis erupted within the cabinet between Interior Minister and CSU Chairman Horst Seehofer and Chancellor Angela Merkel, after Seehofer had elaborated a masterplan on asylum policies, containing the rejection of asylum seekers already registered in other EU countries. Seehofer had threatened to resign over the crisis on 1 July, but an agreement was made between the CDU/CSU sister parties on 2 July.

== Caretaker government ==
The results of the 2017 election had necessitated a series of negotiations that required the Merkel III cabinet to remain in a caretaker capacity for a prolonged period of time (into 2018). Government formation after the 2021 elections lasted until 24 November 2021, and the caretaker government continued until 8 December, making Merkel just 9 days short of the record for longest-serving Chancellor in post-war German history ahead of Helmut Kohl.
