= Third Merkel cabinet =

Government of Germany from 2013 to 2018

Third Cabinet of Angela Merkel Cabinet Merkel III
- 22nd Cabinet of the Federal Republic of Germany
- 17 December 2013 – 24 October 2017 (until 14 March 2018 as caretaker government)
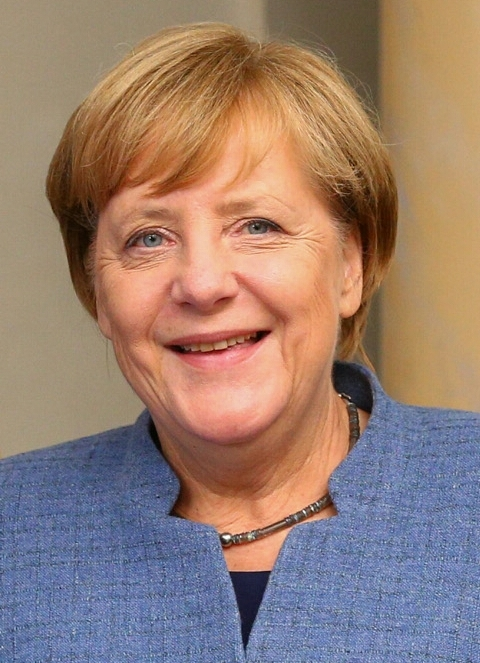
- Date formed: 17 December 2013
- Date dissolved: 14 March 2018 (4 years, 2 months, 3 weeks and 4 days)

People and organisations
- President: Joachim Gauck (until 18 March 2017); Frank-Walter Steinmeier (from 19 March 2017)
- Chancellor: Angela Merkel
- Vice Chancellor: Sigmar Gabriel
- Member parties: Christian Democratic Union; Social Democratic Party; Christian Social Union of Bavaria
- Status in legislature: Grand coalition
- Opposition parties: The Left; The Greens
- Opposition leader: Gregor Gysi (2013–2015); Sahra Wagenknecht (2015–2018); Dietmar Bartsch (2015–2018)

History
- Election: 2013 federal election
- Legislature terms: 18th Bundestag
- Predecessor: Merkel II
- Successor: Merkel IV

The Third Merkel cabinet (German: Kabinett Merkel III) was the 22nd Government of the Federal Republic of Germany during the 18th legislative session of the Bundestag. Installed after the 2013 federal election, it left office on 14 March 2018. It was preceded by the second Merkel cabinet and succeeded by the fourth Merkel cabinet. Led by Chancellor Angela Merkel. The government was supported by a coalition of the Christian Democratic Union (CDU), the Christian Social Union of Bavaria (CSU) and the Social Democrats (SPD). Sigmar Gabriel (SPD) replaced Philipp Rösler (FDP) as Vice Chancellor of Germany and became Federal Minister for Economics and Energy.

The CDU received five ministries in addition to the positions of Chancellor, as well as Chancellery Chief of Staff and Minister for Special Affairs. The SPD controlled six ministries and the CSU three. Although the CSU received a disproportionate share of ministries relative to its weight in the Bundestag, the six most powerful ministries were divided equally between the CDU and the SPD: the CDU controlled the ministries for finance, internal affairs and defense, while the SPD controlled the ministries for foreign affairs, economics and energy, as well as justice and consumer protection.

The term of office of the third Merkel cabinet officially ended with the constitution of the 19th Bundestag on Tuesday, 24 October 2017. Merkel and her cabinet ministers received their discharge papers from the Federal President Frank-Walter Steinmeier on the same day. In accordance with Article 69 of the German Constitution and at the request of the President of Germany, the cabinet remained in office as the caretaker government until a new government is formed.

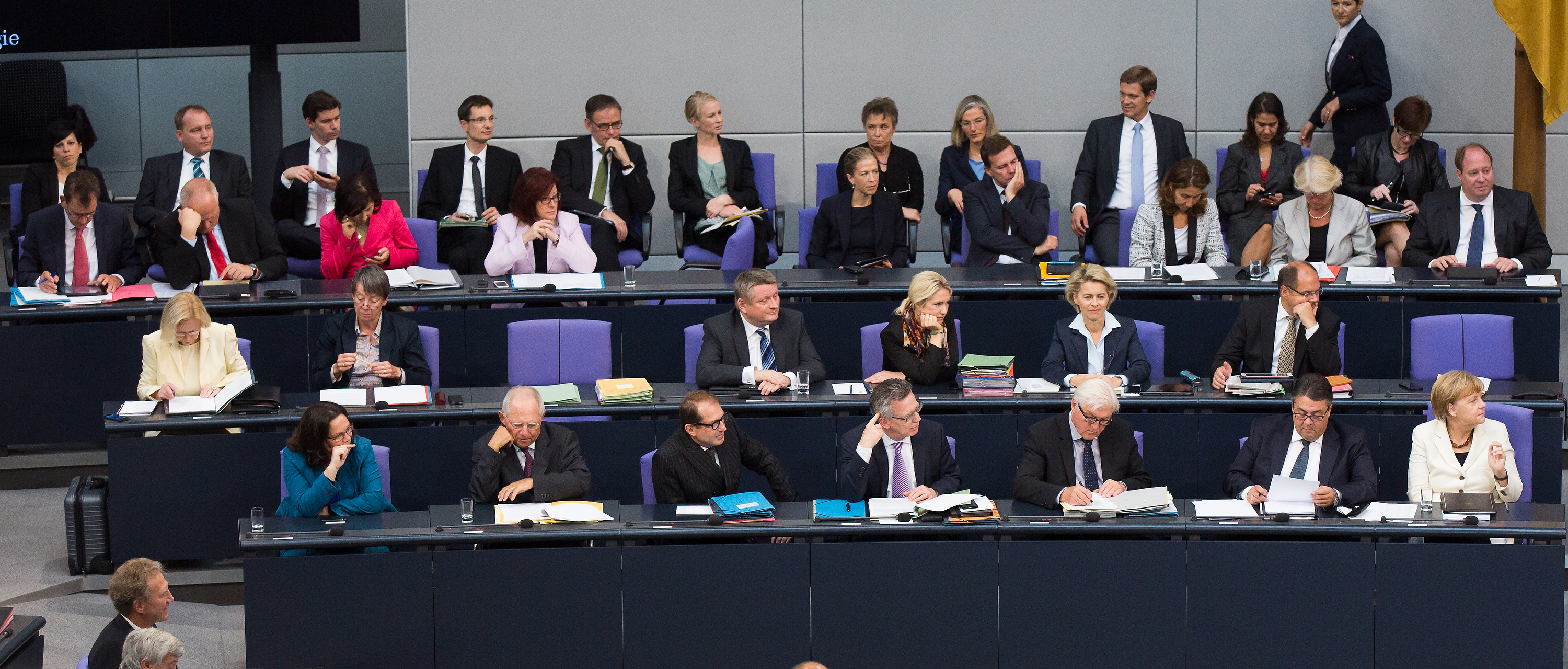
Third Merkel cabinet in the Bundestag, 2014

== Composition ==
Portfolio	Minister	Took office	Left office	Party
Chancellor	Angela Merkel	17 December 2013	14 March 2018	CDU
Vice Chancellor	Sigmar Gabriel	17 December 2013	14 March 2018	SPD
Federal Minister for Foreign Affairs	Frank-Walter Steinmeier	17 December 2013	27 January 2017	SPD
Federal Minister for Foreign Affairs	Sigmar Gabriel	27 January 2017	14 March 2018	SPD
Federal Minister of the Interior	Thomas de Maizière	17 December 2013	14 March 2018	CDU
Federal Minister of Justice and Consumer Protection	Heiko Maas	17 December 2013	14 March 2018	SPD
Federal Minister of Finance	Wolfgang Schäuble	17 December 2013	24 October 2017	CDU
Federal Minister of Finance	Peter Altmaier (Acting)	24 October 2017	14 March 2018	CDU
Federal Minister of Economics and Energy	Sigmar Gabriel	17 December 2013	27 January 2017	SPD
Federal Minister of Economics and Energy	Brigitte Zypries	27 January 2017	14 March 2018	SPD
Federal Minister of Labour and Social Affairs	Andrea Nahles	17 December 2013	28 September 2017	SPD
Federal Minister of Labour and Social Affairs	Katarina Barley (Acting)	28 September 2017	14 March 2018	SPD
Federal Minister of Food and Agriculture	Hans-Peter Friedrich	17 December 2013	7 February 2014	CSU
Federal Minister of Food and Agriculture	Christian Schmidt	7 February 2014	14 March 2018	CSU
Federal Minister of Defense	Ursula von der Leyen	17 December 2013	14 March 2018	CDU
Federal Minister for Family Affairs, Senior Citizens, Women and Youth	Manuela Schwesig	17 December 2013	2 June 2017	SPD
Federal Minister for Family Affairs, Senior Citizens, Women and Youth	Katarina Barley	2 June 2017	14 March 2018	SPD
Federal Minister of Health	Hermann Gröhe	17 December 2013	14 March 2018	CDU
Federal Minister of Transport and Digital Infrastructure	Alexander Dobrindt	17 December 2013	24 October 2017	CSU
Federal Minister of Transport and Digital Infrastructure	Christian Schmidt (Acting)	24 October 2017	14 March 2018	CSU
Federal Minister for the Environment, Nature Conservation, Building and Nuclear Safety	Barbara Hendricks	17 December 2013	14 March 2018	SPD
Federal Minister of Education and Research	Johanna Wanka	17 December 2013	14 March 2018	CDU
Federal Minister of Economic Cooperation	Gerd Müller	17 December 2013	14 March 2018	CSU
Federal Minister of Special Affairs & Head of the Chancellery	Peter Altmaier	17 December 2013	14 March 2018	CDU

== Caretaker government following the 2017 election ==
After the German federal election held on Sunday, 24 September 2017, SPD leader Martin Schulz declared that the SPD had decided to be a part of the opposition during the next legislation period. However, after coalition talks between the Union (CDU/CSU), FDP and the Greens failed, SPD politicians reconsidered, leading to coalition negotiations between the CDU/CSU and the SPD. On 8 February 2018, the negotiations resulted in a provisional agreement to form a grand coalition, which was approved by the party members of the SPD and led to the formation of the new government on 14 March 2018.
