= Baden cabinet =

Last cabinet (1918) of the German Empire

Cabinet of Max von Baden
- 8th Cabinet of the German Empire
- 1918
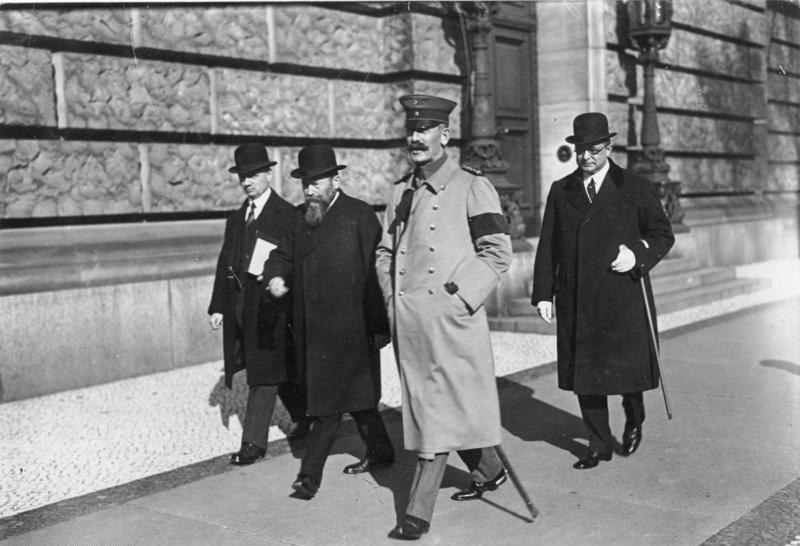
- Max von Baden with Vice-Chancellor von Payer (second from left), Erhard Eduard Deutelmoser (left, press spokesman of the Chancellor) and Wilhelm von Radowitz (right, head of the Reich Chancellery) on their way to the Reichstag, October 1918.
- Date formed: 4 October 1918
- Date dissolved: 9 November 1918 (1 month and 5 days)

People and organisations
- Emperor: Wilhelm II
- Chancellor: Max von Baden
- Vice Chancellor: Friedrich von Payer
- Member parties: Supported by: Progressive People's Party; Centre Party; National Liberal Party; Social Democratic Party
- Status in legislature: Majority

History
- Election: 1912 federal election
- Predecessor: Hertling cabinet
- Successor: Council of the People's Deputies

The Baden cabinet (German: Kabinett Baden) was the final Reichsregierung or Imperial Government of the German Empire. It was formed on 4 October 1918 by Prince Max von Baden, who had been appointed as Reichskanzler (Chancellor) the day before by Emperor Wilhelm II. It was the first cabinet of the Empire to include members of the Social Democratic Party of Germany (SPD). After the constitution was changed in late October 1918, the Chancellor and his government were for the first time accountable to the Reichstag (parliament). Previous governments had been accountable just to the Emperor.

The cabinet would be in office only until 9 November 1918. As a result of the German Revolution, Max von Baden resigned that day, after having announced the abdication of the Emperor. The social democrat Friedrich Ebert took over as Chancellor.

== Composition ==
The members of the cabinet (most of them known as Staatssekretäre or "State Secretaries") were as follows:

Cabinet members
Portfolio	Minister	Took office	Left office	Party
Chancellor	Max von Baden	3 October 1918	9 November 1918	Independent
Vice Chancellor	Friedrich von Payer	9 November 1917	10 November 1918	FVP
State Secretary for Foreign Affairs	Wilhelm Solf	3 October 1918	13 December 1918	Independent
State Secretary for the Interior	Max Wallraf	3 October 1918	6 October 1918	Independent
State Secretary for the Interior	Karl Trimborn	6 October 1918	9 November 1918	Centre
State Secretary for Justice	Paul von Krause	7 August 1917	13 February 1919	NLP
State Secretary for the Navy (Note: There is some confusion about the position of Staatssekretär im Reichsmarineamt. But it seems that both Eduard von Capelle and his successor Paul Behncke resigned before Max von Baden became Chancellor and were thus only part of the cabinet of Georg von Hertling.)	Eduard von Capelle	3 October 1918	6 October 1918	Independent
State Secretary for the Navy	Paul Behncke	6 October 1918	9 November 1918	Independent
State Secretary for Economics	Hans Karl von Stein zu Nord- und Ostheim	3 October 1918	9 November 1918	Independent
State Secretary for Food	Wilhelm von Waldow	3 October 1918	9 November 1918	Independent
State Secretary for Labour	Gustav Bauer	4 October 1918	20 June 1919	SPD
State Secretary for the Post	Otto Rüdlin	3 October 1918	9 November 1918	Independent
State Secretary for the Treasury	Siegfried von Roedern	3 October 1918	9 November 1918	Independent
State Secretary for the Colonies	Wilhelm Solf	20 December 1911	13 December 1918	Independent
Minister without portfolio	Philipp Scheidemann	4 October 1918	9 November 1918	SPD
Minister without portfolio	Matthias Erzberger	4 October 1918	20 June 1919	Centre
Minister without portfolio	Adolf Gröber	4 October 1918	9 November 1918	Centre
Minister without portfolio	Conrad Haußmann	14 October 1918	9 November 1918	FVP
