= List of ambassadors of Germany to Sweden =

The following is a list of German ambassadors in Sweden. The seat of the embassy is the German Embassy Stockholm.

== History ==
The German Embassy is located at Skarpögatan 9 in Stockholm (close to the Embassy of the United Kingdom). There are also honorary consuls located in Gothenburg (the capital of Västra Götaland County), Jönköping (he seat of Jönköping Municipality), Kalmar (the seat of Kalmar Municipality), Luleå (the capital of Norrbotten County), Malmö (the largest city in Skåne County), Rättvik (the seat of Rättvik Municipality), Uddevalla (the seat of Uddevalla Municipality), and Visby (the seat of Gotland Municipality).

== Ambassador of the Federal Republic of Germany ==
Name	Image	Term Start	Term End	Notes
Kurt Sieveking		1951	1953	Consul General
Herbert Siegfried		1954	1958	
Hans-Ulrich von Marchtaler		1958	1961	
Karl Werkmeister		1961	1963	
Hans Ulrich Granow		1963	1964	
Gustav von Schmoller		1964	1968	
Adolf Max Obermayer		1968	1972	
Heinz Dietrich Stoecker		1972	1976	
Heinz Voigt		1976	1978	
Joseph J. Thomas		1978	1981	
Jesco von Puttkamer		1981	1984	
Gerhard Ritzel		1984	1988	
Reinhold Schenk		1988	1992	
Harald Hofmann		1992	1997	
Klaus-Hellmuth Ackermann		1998	2001	
Bernd von Waldow		2001	2003	
Busso von Alvensleben		2003	2006	
Wolfgang Trautwein		2006	2008	
Joachim Rücker		2008	2011	
Harald Kindermann		2011	2014	
Michael Bock		2014	2016	
Hans-Jürgen Heimsoeth		2016	2019	
Anna Elisabeth Prinz		2019	2021	
Joachim Bertele		2021	Present	

== Envoy of the German Empire ==
Name	Image	Term Start	Term End	Notes
Emil von Richthofen		1867	1874	Previously Envoy of the North German Confederation
Friedrich von Eichmann		1874	1875	
Richard von Pfuel		1876	1888	Envoy for the Kingdom of Sweden and Norway
Clemens Busch		1888	1892	
Karl von Wedel		1892	1894	
Hippolyt von Bray-Steinburg		1894	1897	
Nikolaus von Wallwitz		1897	1901	Envoy for the Kingdom of Sweden and Norway
Casimir von Leyden		1901	1905	
Felix von Müller		1905	1907	
Carl Erdmann von Pückler-Burghauss		1908	1910	
Franz von Reichenau		1911	1914	
Hellmuth Lucius von Stoedten		1914	1920	Envoy
Rudolf Nadolny		1920	1924	Envoy
Frederic von Rosenberg		1924	1933	Envoy
Prince Viktor of Wied		1933	1943	Envoy
Hans Thomsen		1943	1945	Envoy

== Envoy of the North German Confederation ==
Name	Image	Term Start	Term End	Notes
Emil von Richthofen		1867	1871	

== Envoys from the German States (before 1871) ==
=== Saxon envoys ===
The Electorate of Saxony sent diplomatic representatives to Sweden since 1722 with the rank of plenipotentiary minister, extraordinary envoy, resident or legation secretary.

Name	Image	Term Start	Term End	Notes
Martin von Frensdorff		1722	1727	
Johann Christoph Walther		1727	1732	
Adam Adolph von Uetterodt		1731	1737	
Johann Christoph Walther		1738	1744	
Johann Heinrich von Tirzschkau		1744	1745	
Nicolaus von Suhm		1745	1750	
Johann Heinrich von Titzschkau		1750	1753	
Carl von der Osten-Sacken		1753	1763	
Johann Heinrich von Titzschkau		1762	1765	
Friedrich August von Zinzendorf		1768	1776	

=== Prussian envoys ===
Establishment of diplomatic relations in 1648.

Name	Image	Term Start	Term End	Notes
Lorenz Georg von Krockow		before 1670	1670	
Christoph von Brandt		1670	1682	
Heinrich von Podewils		1729	1730	
Karl Wilhelm Finck von Finckenstein		1740	1742	
Karl Wilhelm Finck von Finckenstein		1744	1747	
Jakob Friedrich von Rohd		1747	1753	
Helmuth Burchard von Maltzahn		1753	1755	
Victor Friedrich von Solms-Sonnenwalde		1755	1757	
Johann Heinrich Friedrich von Cocceji		1764	1770	
Christian von Dönhoff		1771	1775	
Adrian Heinrich von Borcke		1788	1791	
Karl Christian von Brockhausen		1791	1795	
August Friedrich Ferdinand von der Goltz		1797	1801	
Friedrich Franz von Tarrach		1815	1834	
Adolf von Brockhausen		1835	1843	
Ferdinand von Galen		1843	1844	
Joseph Maria Anton Brassier de Saint-Simon-Vallade		1845	1854	
Otto Franz von Westphalen		1854	1857	
Karl Emil Gustav von Le Coq		1857	1860	
Alphonse von Oriola		1860	1862	
Adalbert von Rosenberg		1862	1867	
Emil von Richthofen		1867	1874	

From 1867: envoy of the North German Confederation, from 1871: envoy of the German Empire

== See also ==
- Sweden–Germany relations
