= Minister for Foreign Affairs (Germany) =

Head of the Federal Foreign Office in the Central European country

Federal Minister of Foreign Affairs
- Bundesminister des Auswärtigen

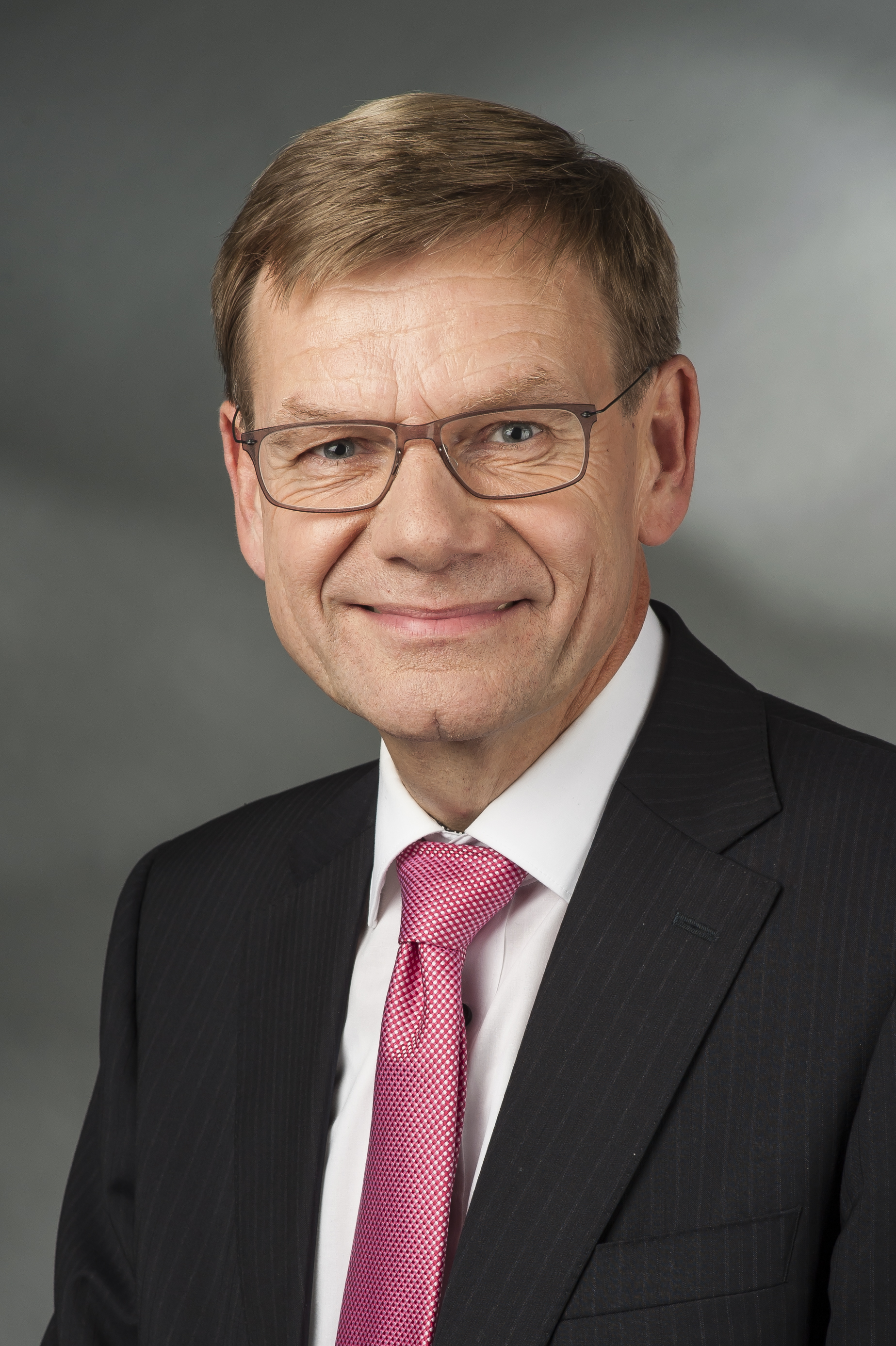
- Incumbent; Johann Wadephul since 6 May 2025
- Federal Foreign Office
- Formation: 21 March 1871
- First holder: Hermann von Thile
- Website: auswärtiges-amt.de

The federal minister for foreign affairs (German: Bundesminister des Auswärtigen) is the head of the Federal Foreign Office and a member of the Cabinet of Germany. The current office holder is Johann Wadephul. From 1966 to 2021, the minister for foreign affairs often also simultaneously held the office of vice-chancellor of Germany, though since 2011 the minister for economic affairs has held the title most often.

== History of the office ==
The Foreign Office was established within the North German Confederation in 1870 and its head, first appointed in 1871, had the rank of secretary of state. As the German constitution of 1871 installed the chancellor as the sole responsible government minister and since the Chancellor generally also held the position of foreign minister of Prussia, the secretary of state fulfilled a more subject role as an assistant to the chancellor, acting largely to draft correspondence rather than to actually direct the formation of foreign policy. This was especially true during the chancellorships of Otto von Bismarck (1871–1890) and Bernhard von Bülow (1900–1909), both of whom had considerable prior experience with foreign affairs, while secretaries at other times wielded more influence over the foreign policy.

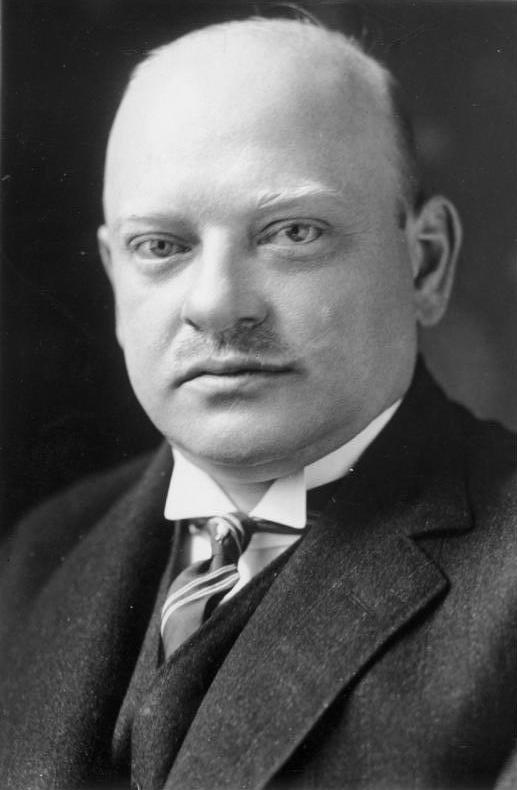
Gustav Stresemann, one of Germany's most influential Foreign Ministers and a 1926 Nobel Peace Prize laureate

In 1919, the Weimar Republic elevated the head of the foreign office to the position of foreign minister responsible for his department. As governments were now formed by parties entering coalitions with each other, individual ministers also gained independence towards from the chancellor.

After a succession of short-lived ministers, Gustav Stresemann, leader of the small National-liberal German People's Party, held the office of foreign minister in successive cabinets from 1923 to his death in 1929. His long term gave stability to Germany's foreign policy and improved the minister's position towards the relatively weak and short-lived chancellors. Stresemann was awarded the 1926 Nobel Peace Prize for his work for reconciliation between Germany and France.

The foreign office remained relatively unaffected by the establishment of the Nazi regime in 1933, as minister Konstantin von Neurath, appointed in 1932, remained in office until 1938; however, the office was increasingly marginalised in actual policy-making and with the replacement of Neurath by Ribbentrop lost any independent standing.

After World War II, two separate German states emerged in 1949, the democratic Federal Republic of Germany in the West and the communist-ruled German Democratic Republic in the East. While the Soviet Union ostensibly restored political sovereignty to its satellite and allowed for a Foreign Ministry of the GDR, West Germany's sovereignty was officially curtailed by the Western powers, especially in the field of foreign policy. In 1951 the Foreign Office was reestablished in West Germany, but Chancellor Konrad Adenauer was required to hold the office of Foreign Minister until the Western powers restored sovereignty to West Germany in 1955. Then, Heinrich von Brentano di Tremezzo succeeded as foreign minister in 1955. In 1990, the GDR ceased to exist as a separate state and its territory was reunited with West Germany.

From the 1966 Grand Coalition government of Kurt Georg Kiesinger onwards, the office has been held by a member of the smaller partner in coalitions. Therefore, the foreign minister also mostly holds the office of vice chancellor of Germany, although this has become less common in recent years – neither of the two most recent foreign ministers, Heiko Maas and Annalena Baerbock, have been vice chancellor, with the vice chancellorship being held by Finance Minister Olaf Scholz during Maas' tenure, and by Economy and Climate Minister Robert Habeck during Baerbock's.

== List of officeholders ==
=== German Reich (1871–1945) ===
State secretaries for foreign affairs (1871–1919)

Name (Birth–Death)	Portrait	Term of office		Chancellor
German Empire (1871–1918)
Hermann von Thile (1812–1889)		21 March 1871	30 September 1872	Bismarck
Hermann Ludwig von Balan (1812–1874)		3 October 1872	9 October 1873	Bismarck
Bernhard Ernst von Bülow (1815–1879)		9 October 1873	20 October 1879	Bismarck
Joseph Maria von Radowitz Jr. (1839–1912)		6 November 1879	17 April 1880	Bismarck
Chlodwig Fürst zu Hohenlohe-Schillingsfürst (1819–1901)		20 April 1880	1 September 1880	Bismarck
Friedrich Graf zu Limburg-Stirum (1835–1912)		1 September 1880	25 June 1881	Bismarck
Clemens Busch (1834–1895)		25 June 1881	16 July 1881	Bismarck
Paul Graf von Hatzfeldt-Wildenburg (1831–1901)		16 July 1881	24 October 1885	Bismarck
Herbert Fürst von Bismarck (1849–1904)		24 October 1885	26 March 1890	Bismarck; Caprivi
Adolf Freiherr Marschall von Bieberstein (1842–1912)		31 March 1890	19 October 1897	Caprivi; Hohenlohe-Schillingsfürst
Bernhard Graf von Bülow (1849–1929)		20 October 1897	23 October 1900	Hohenlohe-Schillingsfürst; Bülow
Oswald Freiherr von Richthofen (1847–1906)		23 October 1900	17 January 1906	Bülow
Heinrich Leonhard von Tschirschky und Bögendorff (1858–1916)		24 January 1906	25 October 1907	Bülow
Wilhelm Freiherr von Schoen (1851–1933)		26 October 1907	27 June 1910	Bülow; Bethmann Hollweg
Alfred von Kiderlen-Waechter (1852–1912)		27 June 1910	30 December 1912	Bethmann Hollweg
Gottlieb von Jagow (1863–1935)		11 January 1913	22 November 1916	Bethmann Hollweg
Arthur Zimmermann (1864–1940)		22 November 1916	6 August 1917	Bethmann Hollweg; Michaelis
Richard von Kühlmann (1873–1948)		6 August 1917	9 July 1918	Michaelis; Hertling (I)
Paul von Hintze (1864–1941)		9 July 1918	3 October 1918	Hertling (I)
Wilhelm Solf (1862–1936)		3 October 1918	9 November 1918	Baden (I)
Weimar Republic (1918–1919)
Wilhelm Solf (1862–1936)		9 November 1918	13 December 1918	Ebert (Council of the People's Deputies)
Ulrich Graf von Brockdorff-Rantzau (1869–1928)		13 December 1918	13 February 1919	Ebert (Council of the People's Deputies)

Ministers of foreign affairs (1919–1945)

Political party: SPD Zentrum DDP DVP NSDAP

No.	Portrait	Minister of Foreign Affairs	Took office	Left office	Time in office	Party	Cabinet
1	Ulrich von Brockdorff-Rantzau	Ulrich von Brockdorff-Rantzau (1869–1928)	13 February 1919	20 June 1919	127 days	Independent	Scheidemann
2	Hermann Müller	Hermann Müller (1876–1931)	21 June 1919	26 March 1920	279 days	SPD	Bauer
3	Adolf Köster	Adolf Köster (1883–1930)	10 April 1920	8 June 1920	59 days	SPD	Müller I
4	Walter Simons	Walter Simons (1861–1937)	25 June 1920	4 May 1921	59 days	Independent	Fehrenbach
5	Friedrich Rosen	Friedrich Rosen (1856–1935)	10 May 1921	22 October 1921	1 year, 136 days	Independent	Wirth I
–	Joseph Wirth	Joseph Wirth (1879–1956); Acting	26 October 1921	31 January 1922	97 days	Centre	Wirth II
6	Walther Rathenau	Walther Rathenau (1867–1922)	1 February 1922	24 June 1922 †	143 days	DDP	Wirth II
–	Joseph Wirth	Joseph Wirth (1879–1956); Acting	24 June 1922	14 November 1922	143 days	Centre	Wirth II
7	Hans von Rosenberg	Hans von Rosenberg (1879–1956)	22 November 1922	11 August 1923	262 days	Independent	Cuno
8	Gustav Stresemann	Gustav Stresemann (1878–1929)	13 August 1923	3 October 1929 †	6 years, 51 days	DVP	Stresemann I–II; Marx I–II; Luther I–II; Marx III–IV; Müller II
9	Julius Curtius	Julius Curtius (1877–1948)	4 October 1929	9 October 1931	2 years, 5 days	DVP	Müller II; Brüning I
10	Heinrich Brüning	Heinrich Brüning (1885–1970)	9 October 1931	30 May 1932	234 days	Centre	Müller II; Brüning II
11	Konstantin von Neurath	Konstantin von Neurath (1873–1956)	1 June 1932	4 February 1938	5 years, 248 days	NSDAP (Independent until 1937)	Papen; Schleicher; Hitler
12	Joachim von Ribbentrop	Joachim von Ribbentrop (1893–1946)	4 February 1938	30 April 1945	7 years, 85 days	NSDAP	Hitler
13	Arthur Seyss-Inquart	Arthur Seyss-Inquart (1892–1946)	30 April 1945	2 May 1945	2 days	NSDAP	Goebbels
14	Lutz Graf Schwerin von Krosigk	Lutz Graf Schwerin von Krosigk (1887–1977)	2 May 1945	23 May 1945	21 days	NSDAP	Schwerin von Krosigk

=== German Democratic Republic (1949–1990) ===
Ministers of foreign affairs

Political party: CDU SED NDPD SPD

No.	Portrait	Minister of Foreign Affairs	Took office	Left office	Time in office	Party	Chairman
1	Georg Dertinger	Georg Dertinger (1902–1968)	12 October 1949	15 January 1953	3 years, 3 months	CDU	Grotewohl
2	Anton Ackermann	Anton Ackermann (1905–1973)	15 January 1953	July 1953	5 months	SED	Grotewohl
3	Lothar Bolz	Lothar Bolz (1903–1986)	July 1953	24 June 1965	11 years, 11 months	NDPD	Grotewohl; Stoph
4	Otto Winzer	Otto Winzer (1902–1975)	24 June 1965	20 January 1975	9 years, 6 months	SED	Stoph; Sindermann
5	Oskar Fischer	Oskar Fischer (1923–2020)	3 March 1975	12 April 1990	15 years, 1 month	SED	Sindermann; Stoph; Modrow
6	Markus Meckel	Markus Meckel (born 1952)	12 April 1990	20 August 1990	4 months	SPD	de Maizière
7	Lothar de Maizière	Lothar de Maizière (born 1940)	20 August 1990	2 October 1990	1 month	CDU	de Maizière

=== Federal Republic of Germany (1949–present) ===
Ministers of foreign affairs, since 1951

Political party: CDU SPD FDP Green

No.	Portrait	Minister of Foreign Affairs	Took office	Left office	Time in office	Party	Cabinet
1	Konrad Adenauer	Konrad Adenauer (1876–1967)	15 March 1951	6 June 1955	4 years, 83 days	CDU	Adenauer I–II
2	Heinrich von Brentano	Heinrich von Brentano (1904–1964)	6 June 1955	30 October 1961	6 years, 146 days	CDU	Adenauer II–III
3	Gerhard Schröder	Gerhard Schröder (1910–1989)	14 November 1961	30 November 1966	5 years, 16 days	CDU	Adenauer IV–V; Erhard I–II
4	Willy Brandt	Willy Brandt (1913–1992)	1 December 1966	20 October 1969	2 years, 323 days	SPD	Kiesinger
5	Walter Scheel	Walter Scheel (1919–2016)	21 October 1969	15 May 1974	4 years, 206 days	FDP	Brandt I–II
6	Hans-Dietrich Genscher	Hans-Dietrich Genscher (1927–2016)	17 May 1974	17 September 1982	8 years, 123 days	FDP	Schmidt I–II–III
7	Helmut Schmidt	Helmut Schmidt (1918–2015)	17 September 1982	1 October 1982	17 days	SPD	Schmidt III
(6)	Hans-Dietrich Genscher	Hans-Dietrich Genscher (1927–2016)	1 October 1982	17 May 1992	9 years, 226 days	FDP	Kohl I–II–III–IV
8	Klaus Kinkel	Klaus Kinkel (1936–2019)	18 May 1992	26 October 1998	6 years, 161 days	FDP	Kohl IV–V
9	Joschka Fischer	Joschka Fischer (born 1948)	27 October 1998	22 November 2005	7 years, 26 days	Greens	Schröder I–II
10	Frank-Walter Steinmeier	Frank-Walter Steinmeier (born 1956)	22 November 2005	28 October 2009	3 years, 340 days	SPD	Merkel I
11	Guido Westerwelle	Guido Westerwelle (1961–2016)	28 October 2009	17 December 2013	4 years, 50 days	FDP	Merkel II
(10)	Frank-Walter Steinmeier	Frank-Walter Steinmeier (born 1956)	17 December 2013	27 January 2017	3 years, 41 days	SPD	Merkel III
12	Sigmar Gabriel	Sigmar Gabriel (born 1959)	27 January 2017	14 March 2018	1 year, 46 days	SPD	Merkel III
13	Heiko Maas	Heiko Maas (born 1966)	14 March 2018	8 December 2021	3 years, 269 days	SPD	Merkel IV
14	Annalena Baerbock	Annalena Baerbock (born 1980)	8 December 2021	6 May 2025	3 years, 149 days	Greens	Scholz
15	Johann Wadephul	Johann Wadephul (born 1963)	6 May 2025	Incumbent	1 year, 186 days	CDU	Merz
