= Hermann von Thile =

German diplomat

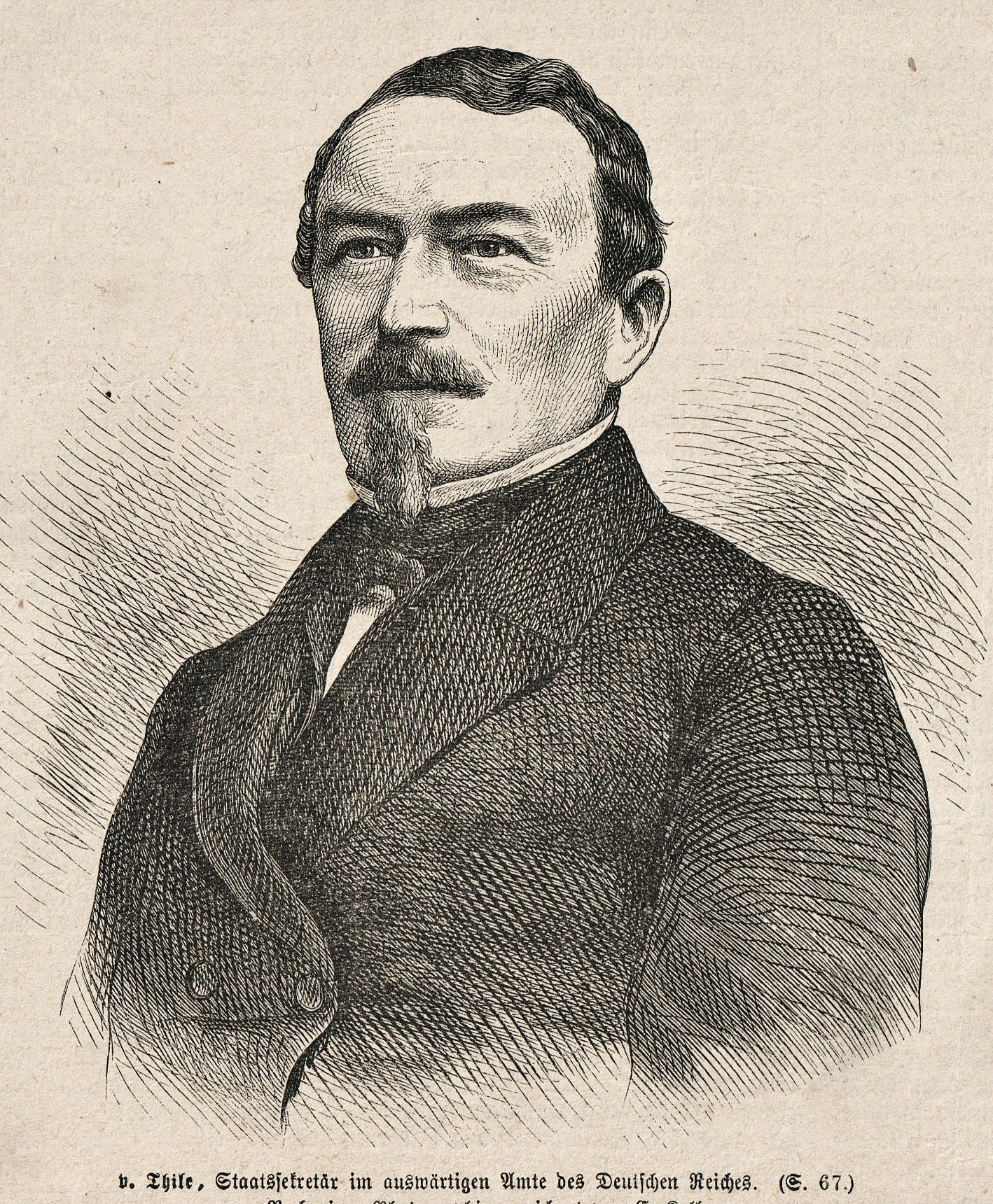

State Secretary for Foreign Affairs
- In office 21 March 1871 – 30 September 1872
- Monarch: Wilhelm I
- Chancellor: Otto von Bismarck
- Preceded by: Position established
- Succeeded by: Hermann Ludwig von Balan

Personal details
- Born: 19 December 1812 Berlin, Kingdom of Prussia
- Died: 16 December 1889 (aged 76) Berlin, German Empire
- Occupation: Diplomat

Karl Hermann von Thile (19 December 1812 – 26 December 1889) was a German diplomat, and the first Foreign Secretary of Germany and head of the Foreign Office (21 March 1871 – 30 September 1872).

== Career ==
He became a diplomat in the Kingdom of Prussia in 1837, and was sent to Rome, Bern, Vienna and London, before he was appointed as the Envoy to Rome in 1854, succeeding Christian Karl Josias von Bunsen. In 1862 he became Under-Secretary of State in the Prussian Ministry of Foreign Affairs.

As Secretary of State, he wielded less power over the direction of the foreign policy than Chancellor Otto von Bismarck.

== Literature ==
- Gregorovius, Ferdinand: "Briefe von Ferdinand Gregorovius an den Staatssekretär Hermann von Thile", (Herausgeber Herman von Petersdorff), Berlin 1894
- Sass, J.: "Hermann von Thile u. Bismarck. Mit unveröffentlichten Briefen Thiles". Preußisches Jbb., 217, 257–279
