= Philipp Ernst, 4th Prince of Hohenlohe-Schillingsfürst =

Bavarian nobility (1853-1915)

Philipp Ernst Maria, 4th Prince of Hohenlohe-Waldenburg-Schillingsfürst (b. Schillingsfürst, 5 June 1853 – d. Bad Reichenhall, 26 December 1915).

== Early life ==
Philipp Ernst Maria was the eldest son of Chlodwig, Prince of Hohenlohe-Schillingsfürst in Schillingsfürst and his wife, Princess Marie of Sayn-Wittgenstein-Sayn.

== Personal life ==
On 10 January 1882 he married Princess Chariclée Ypsilanti (b. Paris, 8 October 1863 - d. Schillingsfürst, 22 June 1912) in Vienna. The marriage produced two daughters who died in infancy:

- Stephanie (b. and d. Schillingsfürst, 23 September 1882)
- Maria (b. Podiebrady, 7 August 1886 - d. Podiebrady, 19 January 1897).

After the death of Princess Marie, he married morganatically in Edinburgh on 6 August 1913 to actress Henriette Gindra (b. Vienna, 7 October 1884 - d. Innsbruck, 15 May 1952). She was created Frau von Hellberg on 10 July 1914. She was 31 years younger than him. The couple had a son:

- Alexander von Hellberg (b. Munich, 19 March 1914 - killed in battle, Givors, 24 August 1944), who married Helga Lüth in Munich on 27 February 1937.

Philipp Ernst Maria died on 26 December 1915 in Bad Reichenhall without a successible male heir. His brother, Maurice, became Prince of Hohenlohe-Schillingsfürst.

== Ancestry ==
Ancestors of Philipp Ernst, 4th Prince of Hohenlohe-Schillingsfürst

16. Karl Albrecht I, 2nd Prince of Hohenlohe-Waldenburg in Schillingsfürst
8. Karl Albrecht II, 3rd Prince of Hohenlohe-Waldenburg in Schillingsfürst
17. Princess Sophie of Löwenstein-Wertheim-Rochefort
4. Franz Joseph, 1st Prince of Hohenlohe-Schillingsfürst
18. Baron Johann Kazimir Reviczky de Revisnye
9. Baroness Judith Reviczky de Revisnye
19. Baroness Rosalie Perényi de Perény
2. Chlodwig, 3rd Prince of Hohenlohe-Schillingsfürst
20. Christian Albrecht, 2nd Prince of Hohenlohe-Langenburg
10. Karl Ludwig, 3rd Prince of Hohenlohe-Langenburg
21. Countess Caroline of Stolberg-Gedern
5. Princess Constanze of Hohenlohe-Langenburg
22. Johann Christian II, Count of Solms-Baruth
11. Countess Amalie Henriette of Solms-Baruth
23. Countess Friederike Reuss of Köstritz
1. Philipp Ernst, 4th Prince of Hohenlohe-Schillingsfürst
24. Christian Louis Casimir, 2nd Count of Sayn-Wittgenstein-Ludwigsburg-Berleburg
12. Ludwig Adolf Peter, 1st Prince of Sayn-Wittgenstein-Berleburg-Ludwigsburg
25. Countess Amalie Ludowika Finck von Finckenstein
6. Ludwig Adolf Friedrich, 2nd Prince of Sayn-Wittgenstein-Sayn
26. Count Stanislaw Snarski
13. Countess Antonia Cäcilie Snarska
27. Maria Kazimiera Swolinska
3. Princess Marie of Sayn-Wittgenstein-Sayn
28. Prince Hieronim Wincenty Radziwill
14. Prince Dominik Hieronim Radziwill
29. Princess Sophie Friederike of Thurn and Taxis
7. Princess Caroline Stephanie Radziwill
30. Karol Morawski
15. Teofilia Morawska
31. Anna Dunin-Jundzill h. Łabędź

Philipp Ernst, 4th Prince of Hohenlohe-Schillingsfürst House of Hohenlohe-Schillingsfürst Cadet branch of the House of Hohenlohe Born: 5 June 1853 Died: 26 December 1915
German nobility
Preceded by Chlodwig	Prince of Hohenlohe-Schillingsfürst; 6 July 1901 – 26 December 1915	Succeeded by Moritz
