= Friedrich zu Limburg-Stirum =

German nobleman, diplomat and politician

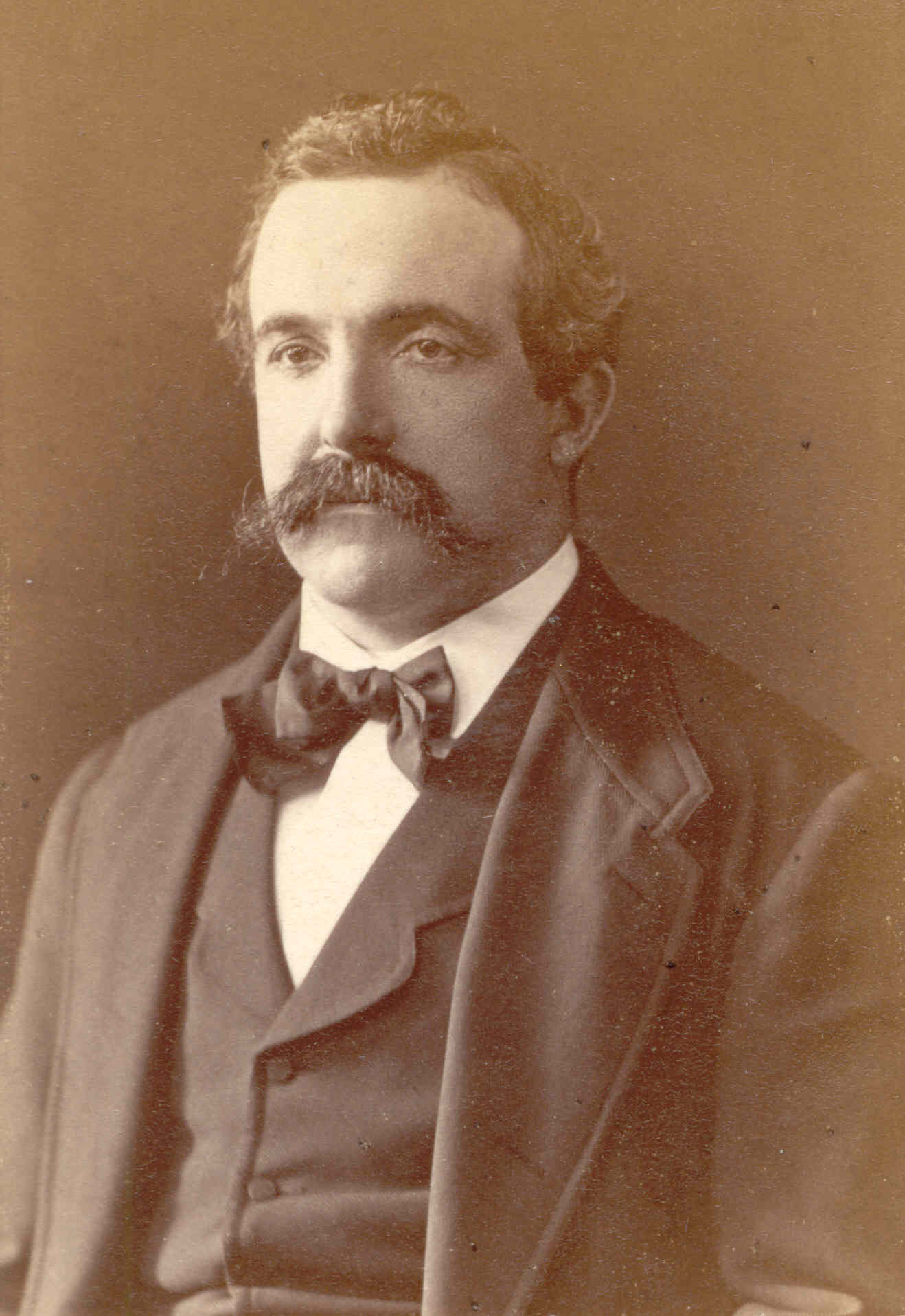
- Count Friedrich zu Limburg-Stirum

State Secretary for Foreign Affairs
- In office 1 September 1880 – 25 June 1881
- Monarch: Wilhelm I
- Chancellor: Otto von Bismarck
- Preceded by: Chlodwig Fürst zu Hohenlohe-Schillingsfürst
- Succeeded by: Clemens Busch

Personal details
- Born: 6 August 1835 The Hague, Kingdom of Netherlands
- Died: 27 October 1912 (aged 77) Groß Peterwitz, Province of Silesia, German Empire
- Spouse: Paula von Meyerinck
- Children: 5
- Occupation: Diplomat, politician

Friedrich Wilhelm Graf zu Limburg-Stirum (6 August 1835 – 27 October 1912) was a German nobleman, diplomat and politician.

== Biography ==
By birth a member of an ancient House of Limburg-Stirum, he was the son of Count Frederik Adrian of Limburg-Stirum (1804–1874). Friedrich Wilhem served as acting Foreign Secretary and head of the Foreign Office from September 1880 to 25 June 1881. Having until then served as Deputy Secretary of State in the Foreign Office, he was appointed as Foreign Secretary after Chlodwig, Prince of Hohenlohe-Schillingsfürst resigned from this position. He was subsequently succeeded by Clemens Busch as acting Secretary.

He was a member of the Reichstag from 1898 to 1903. In 1904, he was given an honorary doctorate of law by the University of Wisconsin–Madison.

== Marriage and issue ==
In 1865, he married Paula Minette Therese Nanny Amalie von Meyerinck (10 October 1844 – 16 July 1925), and they had issue:

- Johanna (1866–1944); she married in 1887 Günther von Tschirschky und Bögendorff (1860–1914);
- Theodora (1867–1953); she married in 1902 Count August von Pückler-Groditz (1864–1937);
- Friedrich (1871–1953); he married in 1907 Lucie von Lieres und Wilkau (1885–1909);
- Richard (1874–1931); he married in 1914 Baroness Edith von Bodenhausen (1888–1961);
- Menno (1881–1953); he married in 1916 (divorced 1918) Hildegard Wertheim (1894–1919).
