= Joseph Maria von Radowitz Jr. =

German diplomat

Joseph Maria von Radowitz
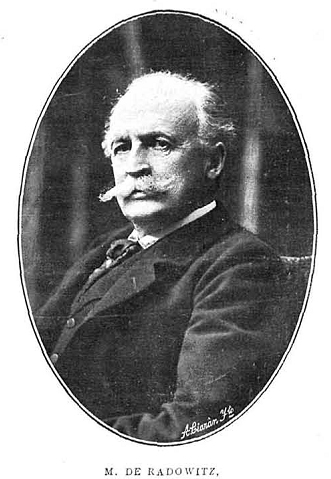

German Ambassador to Spain
- In office July 1892 – November 1908
- Monarch: Wilhelm II
- Preceded by: Ferdinand Eduard von Stumm
- Succeeded by: Christian von Tattenbach

State Secretary for Foreign Affairs
- In office 6 November 1879 – 17 April 1880
- Monarch: Wilhelm I
- Chancellor: Otto von Bismarck
- Preceded by: Bernhard Ernst von Bülow
- Succeeded by: Chlodwig Fürst zu Hohenlohe-Schillingsfürst

Personal details
- Born: 19 May 1839 Frankfurt am Main, German Confederation
- Died: 15 January 1912 (aged 72) Berlin, German Empire
- Spouse: Nadine von Ozerov
- Children: 3
- Parents: Joseph von Radowitz (father); Countess Maria Auguste Karoline Luise von Voß (mother)
- Occupation: Diplomat

Joseph Maria Friedrich von Radowitz (19 May 1839 – 15 January 1912) was a German diplomat who served as acting Foreign Secretary and head of the Foreign Office from 6 November 1879 until 17 April 1880.

== Biography ==
Radowitz was born in Frankfurt am Main, the son of Prussian statesman Joseph von Radowitz. He joined the diplomatic service of Prussia in 1860, and was stationed in Istanbul, China and Japan until 1865. Upon his return to Europe, he was stationed in Paris. During the Austro-Prussian War, he served as aide-de-camp to Prince Frederick Charles of Prussia, and was subsequently attached to the Prussian diplomatic mission in Munich (Kingdom of Bavaria). He became Consul General of the North German Confederation to Bucharest in 1870 and a member of the European Donau Commission. In 1872, he was appointed as chargé d'affaires to Istanbul, before he became Director for Oriental Affairs at the Foreign Office. He was appointed as Envoy to Athens in 1874, but remained in Berlin. In 1875, he became acting Ambassador to St. Petersburg, where he offered Russia German support for Russian interests in the Balkans in exchange for Russian support for German interests in Western Europe. In 1878 he took part at the Congress of Berlin.

After the death of Bernhard Ernst von Bülow, Radowitz was appointed as acting Foreign Secretary, until he was succeeded by Chlodwig, Prince of Hohenlohe-Schillingsfürst.

He became Ambassador to Istanbul in October 1882 and Ambassador to Madrid in 1892. He died in Berlin.

== Orders and decorations ==
- Kingdom of Prussia:
  - Landwehr Service Medal, 1st Class
  - Knight of the Order of the Red Eagle, 4th Class with Swords, 1866; 2nd Class with Oak Leaves and Swords on Ring, 1877; with Star, 5 December 1878; Grand Cross with Crown and in Diamonds
  - Knight of the Royal Order of the Crown, 1st Class, 18 January 1886
- Kingdom of Bavaria: Grand Cross of the Merit Order of Saint Michael, 1881
- Mecklenburg: Grand Cross of the House Order of the Wendish Crown, with Golden Crown
- Kingdom of Saxony: Grand Cross of the Albert Order, with Golden Star
- Austrian Empire: Knight of the Imperial Order of the Iron Crown, 1st Class
- Ottoman Empire:
  - Gold Imtiaz Medal
  - Order of Osmanieh, 1st Class in Diamonds
  - Order of the Medjidie, 1st Class in Diamonds
- Kingdom of Romania: Grand Cross of the Order of the Star of Romania
- Spain: Grand Cross of the Royal and Distinguished Order of Charles III

== Literature ==
- Hajo Holborn (ed.): Aufzeichnungen und Erinnerungen aus dem Leben des Botschafters Joseph Maria von Radowitz. Deutsche Verlagsanstalt, Stuttgart/Berlin/Leipzig 1925.
