= Clemens Busch =

German diplomat

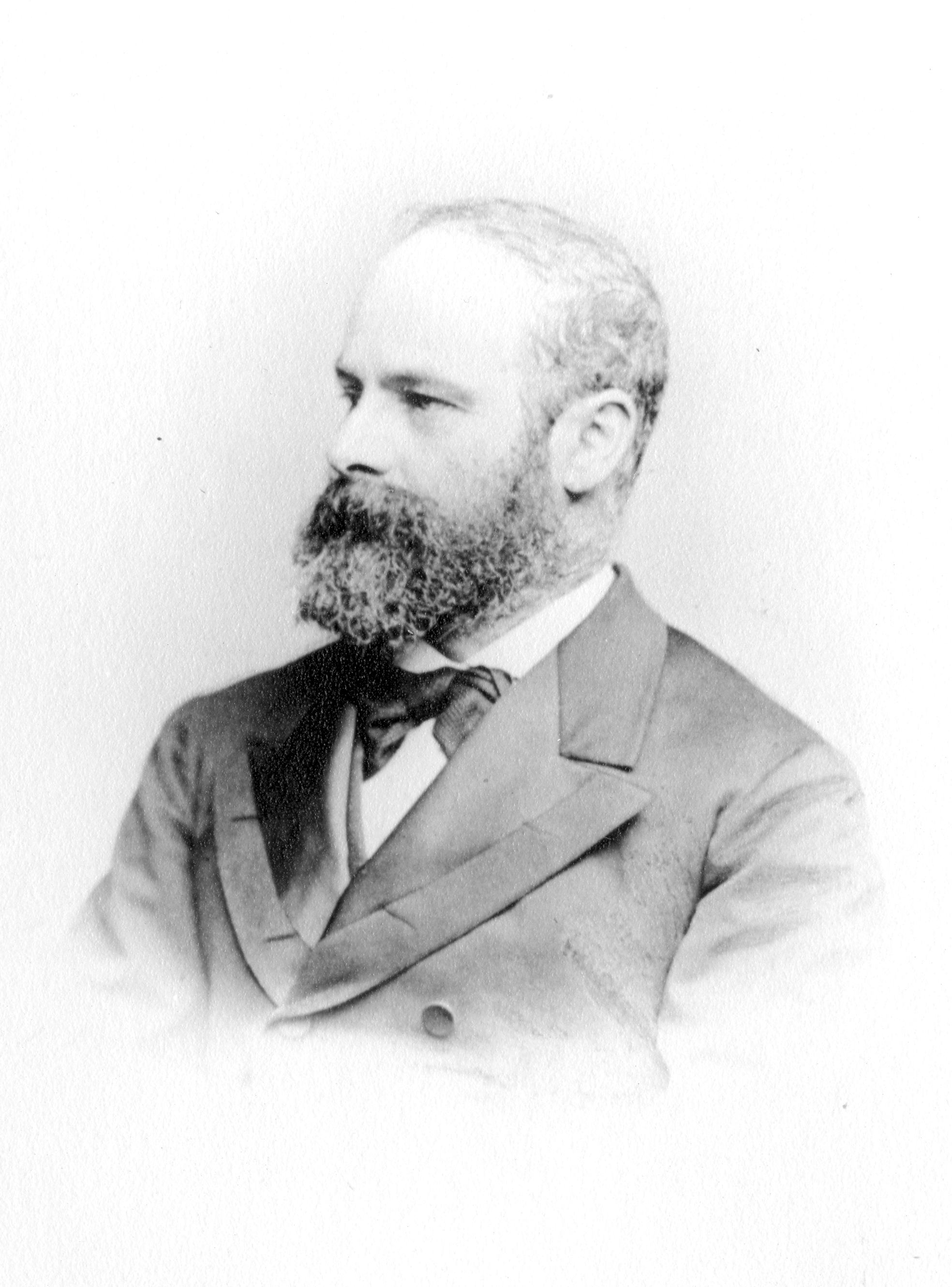

German Ambassador to Switzerland
- In office 1892–1895
- Monarch: Wilhelm II
- Preceded by: Otto von Bülow
- Succeeded by: Wolfram von Rotenhan

German Minister to Sweden
- In office 1888–1892
- Preceded by: Richard von Pfuel
- Succeeded by: Karl von Wedel

Acting State Secretary for Foreign Affairs
- In office 25 June 1881 – 16 July 1881
- Monarch: Wilhelm I
- Chancellor: Otto von Bismarck
- Preceded by: Friedrich zu Limburg-Stirum
- Succeeded by: Paul von Hatzfeldt

Personal details
- Born: 10 May 1834 Cologne, Kingdom of Prussia
- Died: 25 November 1895 (aged 61) Bern, Switzerland
- Spouse: Margot Bendemann
- Children: 3
- Occupation: Diplomat

Clemens August Busch (10 May 1834 – 25 November 1895) was a German diplomat who represented his country at the Berlin Conference of 1884–1885, in which he signed the final acts.

== Early life ==
Busch was born in Cologne on 10 May 1834. He was a son of Johann Michael Busch (1802–1864) and Barbara Philippart (1800–1883).

== Career ==
From 1879 to 1881 Busch was the Imperial German Consul General in Budapest. He served as acting head of the Foreign Office from 25 June to 16 July 1881, succeeding Count Friedrich of Limburg Stirum, until he was replaced by Paul von Hatzfeldt, until then the Ambassador to Constantinople. In 1884 he was appointed to the Prussian State Council.

From 1885 to 1888, he was envoy of the German Empire in Bucharest and from 1888 to 1892, the envoy to Sweden in Stockholm. In 1892, he succeeded Otto von Bülow as the German Ambassador to Switzerland in Bern, serving until his death in 1895.

== Personal life ==
In 1875 Busch was married to Margarethe Bendemann (1850–1938), the widow of Justus Friedländer, German consul in Constantinople, and sister of the Prussian Lieutenant General Hans Bendemann. After their marriage, he adopted his ten-year-old stepson, Felix Emil Johannes Friedländer, who became known as Felix Busch, in 1881. The couple had several children including:

- Clemens Busch (1879–1966), a lawyer and district president in Cologne; he married Maria von Schnitzler, a daughter of the Paul von Schnitzler, in 1917.
- Ernst Busch (1887–1973), Consul General.
- Beate Busch, who married Adam Mauritz August von Eckermann, Swedish Naval Director and Chief of the Marine Corps of Engineers.

He died in Bern on 25 November 1895.
