= Chlodwig, Prince of Hohenlohe-Schillingsfürst =

Chancellor of the German Empire from 1894 to 1900

His Serene Highness Chlodwig Prince of Hohenlohe-Schillingsfürst
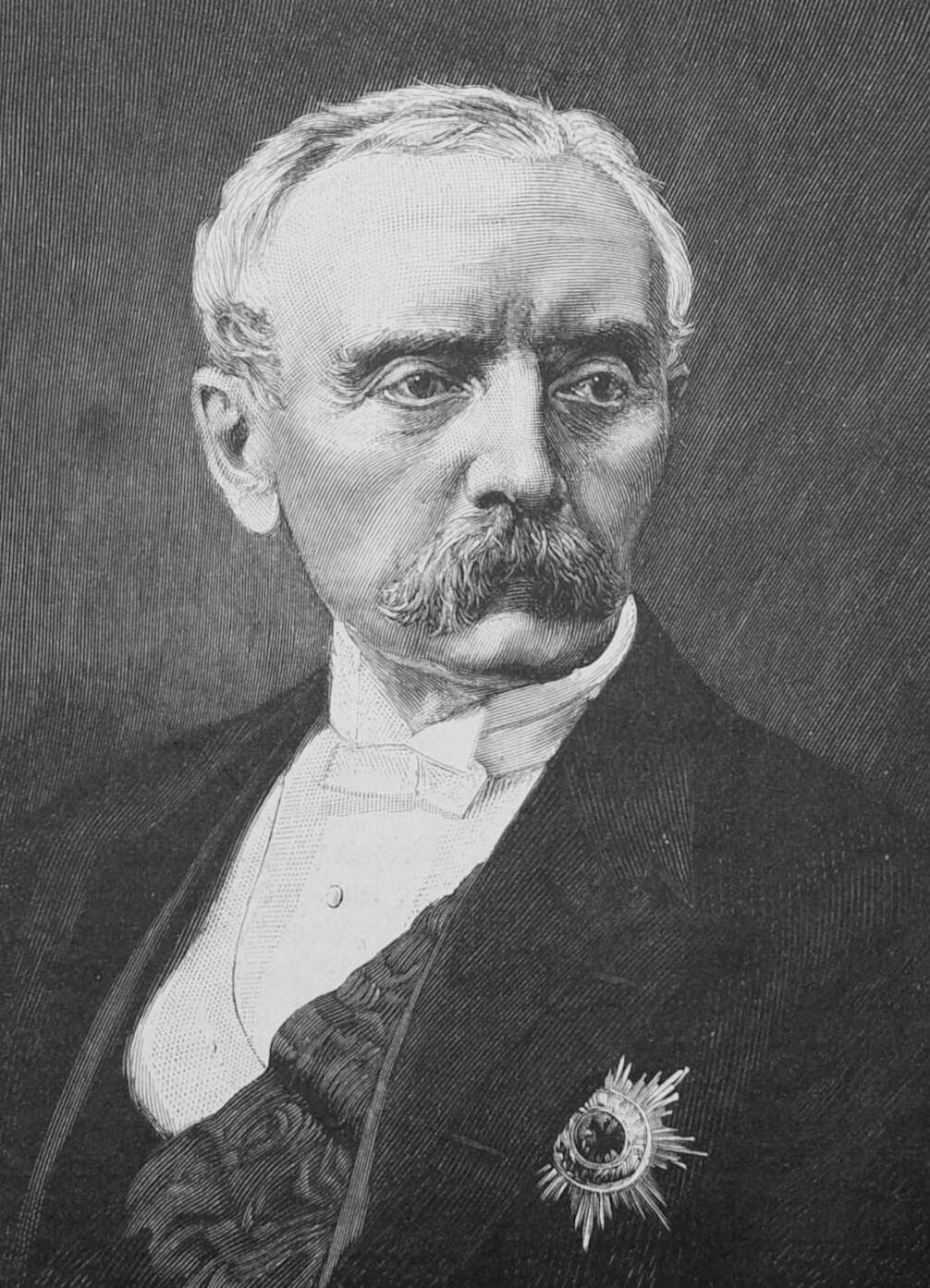
- Chlodwig c. 1894

Chancellor of the German Empire
- In office 29 October 1894 – 17 October 1900
- Monarch: Wilhelm II
- Deputy: Karl Heinrich von Boetticher; Arthur von Posadowsky-Wehner
- Preceded by: Leo von Caprivi
- Succeeded by: Bernhard von Bülow

Minister President of Prussia
- In office 29 October 1894 – 17 October 1900
- Monarch: Wilhelm II
- Preceded by: Botho zu Eulenburg
- Succeeded by: Bernhard von Bülow

State Secretary for Foreign Affairs
- In office 20 April 1880 – 1 September 1880
- Monarch: Wilhelm I
- Chancellor: Otto von Bismarck
- Preceded by: Joseph Maria von Radowitz
- Succeeded by: Friedrich zu Limburg-Stirum

Minister President of Bavaria
- In office 31 December 1866 – 8 March 1870
- Monarch: Ludwig II
- Preceded by: Ludwig von der Pfordten
- Succeeded by: Otto von Bray-Steinburg

Member of the Reichstag
- In office 1871–1881
- Constituency: Oberfranken 3

Personal details
- Born: Chlodwig Carl Viktor zu Hohenlohe-Schillingsfürst; 31 March 1819 Rotenburg an der Fulda, Electorate of Hesse, German Confederation
- Died: 6 July 1901 (aged 82) Bad Ragaz, St. Gallen, Switzerland
- Party: Independent
- Other political affiliations: Imperial Liberal Party (1871–1874)
- Spouse: Princess Marie von Sayn-Wittgenstein-Sayn (m. 1847; died 1897)
- Children: Philipp Ernst; Elisabeth Constanze Leonille; Stephanie Marie Antonie; Albert; Alexander; Moritz
- Parents: Franz Joseph, 5th Prince of Hohenlohe-Schillingsfürst; Princess Konstanze of Hohenlohe-Langenburg

Chlodwig Carl Viktor, Prince of Hohenlohe-Schillingsfürst, Prince of Ratibor and Corvey (German: Chlodwig Carl Viktor Fürst zu Hohenlohe-Schillingsfürst, Prinz von Ratibor und von Corvey) (31 March 1819 – 6 July 1901), usually referred to as the Prince of Hohenlohe, was a German statesman, who served as the imperial chancellor of the German Empire and minister-president of Prussia from 1894 to 1900.

A member of the princely house of Hohenlohe, Chlodwig served in the Prussian civil service until 1845, when he succeeded as Prince of Hohenlohe-Schillingsfürst and became a member of the Bavarian Reichsrat. In 1866, on the recommendation of the composer Richard Wagner, Hohenlohe was appointed minister-president of Bavaria, and came to be regarded as the second most important statesman in Germany after Otto von Bismarck. His pro-Prussian stance and opposition to ultramontanism ultimately led to his downfall. He was forced to resign in 1870 but remained a highly influential figure. In 1871, he was elected to the Reichstag and made its vice president. Hohenlohe was among the most prominent liberal politicians of his time in Germany; he was also a strenuous supporter of Bismark's anti-papal Kulturkampf measures. In 1873, Bismarck appointed him German ambassador in Paris. He was recalled to Berlin seven years later and served briefly as foreign secretary. In 1885, he was appointed governor of Alsace–Lorraine.

In 1894, Emperor Wilhelm II dismissed Leo von Caprivi and appointed Hohenlohe imperial chancellor. Then advanced in age, he rarely appeared in parliament and granted great independence to his secretaries of state, such as foreign secretary Bernhard von Bülow. His power further diminished as a result of Wilhelm's assertiveness. Hohenlohe resigned the chancellorship in 1900 and was succeeded by Bülow. He died a year later at the age of 82.

== Biography ==
Chlodwig was born at Rotenburg an der Fulda, in Hesse, a member of the princely House of Hohenlohe. His father, Prince Franz Joseph (1787–1841), was a Catholic; his mother, Princess Konstanze of Hohenlohe-Langenburg, a Lutheran. In accordance with the compromise customary at the time, Chlodwig and his brothers were brought up in the Roman Catholic religion of their father.

=== Early career ===
As the younger son of a cadet line of his house, it was necessary for Chlodwig to follow a profession. For a while he thought of obtaining a commission in the British army through the influence of his aunt, Princess Feodora of Hohenlohe-Langenburg, half-sister to Queen Victoria. Instead, however, he decided to enter the Prussian diplomatic service.

Chlodwig's application to be excused the preliminary steps, which involved several years' work in subordinate positions in the Prussian civil service, was refused by King Frederick William IV. As auscultator in the courts at Koblenz he acquired a taste for jurisprudence. He became a referendar in September 1843, and after some months of travel in France, Switzerland and Italy he went to Potsdam as a civil servant 13 May 1844.

These early years were invaluable - not only did it provide him experience of practical affairs, it also afforded him an insight into the strength and weakness of the Prussian system. The immediate result was to confirm his Liberalism. The Prussian principle of propagating enlightenment with a stick did not appeal to him; he recognized the confusion and want of clear ideas in the highest circles, the tendency to make agreement with the views of the government the test of loyalty to the state; and he noted in his journal (25 June 1844) four years before the revolution of 1848, "a slight cause and we shall have a rising." "The free press," he notes on another occasion, "is a necessity, progress the condition of the existence of a state." If he was an ardent advocate of German unity, and saw in Prussia the instrument for its attainment, he was throughout opposed to the "Prussification" of Germany.

=== Succession to family titles and estates ===
Chlodwig was the second of six sons. In 1834 his mother's brother-in-law Landgrave Viktor Amadeus of Hesse-Rotenburg died, leaving his estates to his nephews. It was not until 1840 that it was determined how to divide these estates. On 15 October 1840 Chlodwig's older brother, Viktor Moritz Karl zu Hohenlohe-Schillingsfürst, 1st Fürst von Corvey (10 February 1818 – 30 January 1893), renounced his rights as first-born son to the Principality of Hohenlohe-Schillingsfürst, and was made Duke of Ratibor and Prince of Corvey by King Frederick William IV of Prussia; at the same time Chlodwig received the additional title of Prince of Ratibor and Corvey. He also received the lordship of Treffurt in the Prussian governmental district of Erfurt.

On 14 January 1841, Chlodwig's father, Fürst Franz Joseph (1787–1841), died. As second son he ought to have succeeded as Prince (Fürst) of Hohenlohe-Schillingsfürst, but instead he renounced his rights to his third brother Philipp Ernst, (24 May 1820 – 3 May 1845), with the stipulation that they would revert to him in case of his brother's death. On 3 May 1845 Philipp Ernst died, and Chlodwig succeeded as seventh Prince of Hohenlohe-Schillingsfürst. As such he was an hereditary member of the Upper House of the Bavarian Reichsrat. Such a position was incompatible with his political career in Prussia. On 18 April 1846, he took his seat as a member of the Bavarian Reichsrat, and the following 26 June he received his formal discharge from the Prussian service.

Chlodwig's political life for the next eighteen years was generally uneventful. During the Revolution of 1848 his sympathies were with the Liberal idea of a united Germany, and he compromised his chances of favor from King Maximilian II of Bavaria by accepting the task of announcing to the courts of Rome, Florence and Athens the accession to office of the Archduke Johann of Austria as regent of Germany.

In general, this period of Chlodwig's life was occupied in the management of his estates, in the sessions of the Bavarian Reichsrat and in travels. In 1856 he visited Rome, during which he noted the influence of the Jesuits. In 1859 he was studying the political situation at Berlin, and in the same year he paid a visit to England. The marriage of his cadet brother, Prince Konstantin of Hohenlohe-Schillingsfürst (8 September 1828 – Vienna, Austria, 14 February 1896), to Princess Marie of Sayn-Wittgenstein (18 February 1837 – 21 January 1920), on 15 October 1859 at Weimar, Germany led also to frequent visits to Vienna. Thus Chlodwig was brought into close touch with all the most notable people in Europe, including Catholic leaders of the Austrian Empire.

At the same time, during this period (1850–1866) he was endeavouring to get into relations with the Bavarian government, with a view to taking a more active part in affairs. Towards the German question his attitude at this time was tentative. He had little hope of a practical realization of a united Germany, and inclined towards the tripartite divisions under Austria, Prussia and Bavaria (the so-called "Trias-Lösung"). He attended the Fürstentag at Frankfurt in 1863; further, in the Schleswig-Holstein question, he was a supporter of the prince of Augustenburg. It was at this time that, at the request of Queen Victoria, he began to send her regular reports on the political condition of Germany.

His portrait was painted by Philip de László.

=== Minister-President of Bavaria ===
After the Austro-Prussian War of 1866, Chlodwig argued in the Bavarian Reichsrat for a closer union with mainly Protestant Prussia. King Ludwig II of Bavaria was opposed to any dilution of his power, but was eventually brought around, after Bismarck secretly bequeathed him a large sum from the Welfen-Funds (a large part of the fortune of the royal House of Hanover used after the annexation of Hanover by Prussia to fight Hannoverian loyalists) to pay off his large debts.

On 31 December 1866, Chlodwig was appointed minister of the royal house and of foreign affairs and president of the council of ministers. According to Chlodwig's son Alexander (Denkwurdigkeiten, i. 178, 211) Chlodwig's appointment as Minister-President occurred at the instigation of the composer Richard Wagner.

As head of the Bavarian government Chlodwig's principal task was to discover some basis for an effective union of the South German states with the North German Confederation. During the three critical years of his tenure of office he was, next to Bismarck, the most important statesman in Germany. He carried out the reorganization of the Bavarian army on the Prussian model, brought about the military union of the southern states, and took a leading share in the creation of the customs parliament (Zollparlament), of which on 28 April 1868 he was elected a vice-president.

During the agitation that arose in connection with the summoning of the First Vatican Council Chlodwig took up an attitude of strong opposition to the ultramontane position. In common with his brothers, the Duke of Ratibor and Cardinal Prince Gustav Adolf zu Hohenlohe-Schillingsfürst, he believed that the policy of Pope Pius IX of setting the Church in opposition to the modern state would prove ruinous to both, and that the definition of the dogma of papal infallibility would irrevocably commit the Church to the pronouncements of the Syllabus of Errors (1864).

This view he embodied into a circular note to the Roman Catholic powers (9 April 1869), drawn up by Johann Joseph Ignaz von Döllinger, inviting them to exercise the right of sending ambassadors to the council and to combine to prevent the definition of the dogma. The greater powers, however, were for one reason or another unwilling to intervene, and the only practical outcome of Chlodwig's action was that in Bavaria the powerful ultramontane party combined against him with the Bavarian patriots who accused him of bartering away Bavarian independence to Prussia. The combination was too strong for him; a bill which he brought in for curbing the influence of the Church over education was defeated, the elections of 1869 went against him, and in spite of the continued support of the king he was forced to resign (7 March 1870).

=== Continuing influence ===
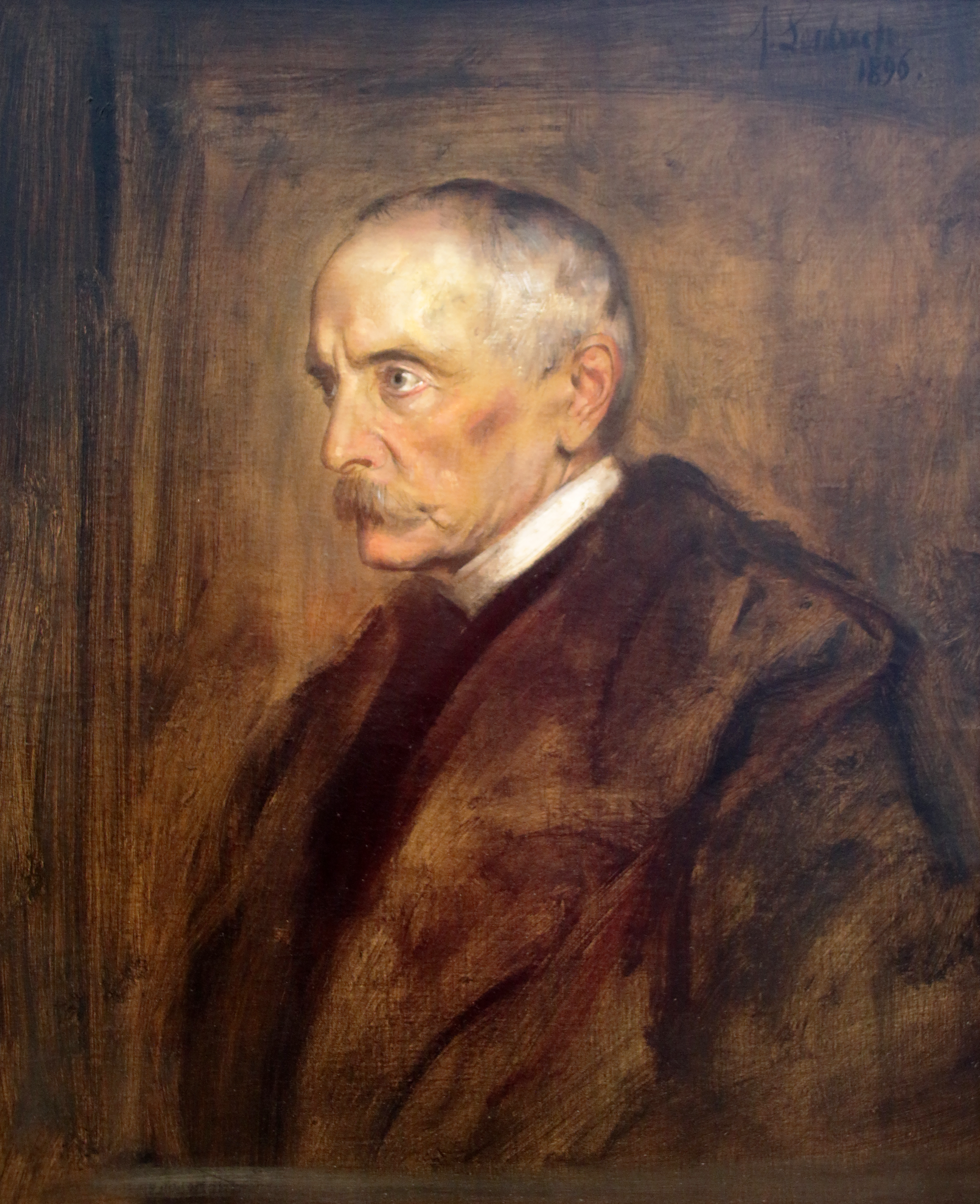
Portrait of Prince Hohenlohe, by Franz von Lenbach, 1896

Though out of office, his personal influence continued to be very great both at Munich and Berlin, in no small part due to the favorable terms of the treaty of the North German Confederation with Bavaria, which embodied his views, and with its acceptance by the Bavarian parliament. Elected a member of the German Reichstag, he was chosen as one of its vice-presidents on 23 March 1871. He was instrumental in founding the new groups which took the name of the Imperial Liberal Party (Liberale Reichspartei), the objects of which were to support the new empire, to secure its internal development on Liberal lines, and to oppose the Catholic Centre.

Like his brother the Duke of Ratibor, Chlodwig was from the first a strenuous supporter of Bismarck's anti-papal policy (the Kulturkampf), the main lines of which (prohibition of the Society of Jesus, etc.) he himself suggested. Although he sympathized with the motives of the Old Catholics, he did not join them, believing that the only hope for a reform of the church lay with those who desired it remaining within the church. In 1872 Bismarck proposed appointing Chlodwig's younger brother, Cardinal Prince Gustav Adolf von Hohenlohe-Schillingsfürst, as Prussian envoy to the Holy See, but Pope Pius IX refused to receive him in this capacity.

In 1873, Bismarck chose Chlodwig to succeed Count Harry von Arnim as German ambassador in Paris, where he remained for seven years. In 1878, he attended the Congress of Berlin as third German representative. In 1880, after the death of the German Secretary of State for Foreign Affairs, Bernhard Ernst von Bülow (20 October 1879), Chlodwig was called to Berlin as temporary head of the Foreign Office and representative of Bismarck during his absence through illness.

In 1885, Chlodwig was chosen to succeed Edwin Freiherr von Manteuffel as governor of Alsace-Lorraine, incorporated after the 1870 war against France. In this capacity, he had to carry out the coercive measures introduced by Bismarck in 1887 and 1888, though he largely disapproved of them; his conciliatory disposition, however, did much to reconcile the Alsace-Lorrainers to German rule.

=== Chancellor of Germany ===
Cabinet (1894–1900)
Office	Incumbent	In office	Party
Imperial Chancellor	Chlodwig zu Hohenlohe-Schillingsfürst	29 October 1894 – 17 October 1900	None
Vice-Chancellor of Germany; Secretary for the Interior	Karl von Boetticher	20 March 1890 – 1 July 1897	None
Vice-Chancellor of Germany; Secretary for the Interior	Arthur von Posadowsky-Wehner	1 July 1897 – 24 June 1907	None
Secretary for the Foreign Affairs	Adolf von Bieberstein	26 March 1890 – 20 October 1897	None
Secretary for the Foreign Affairs	Bernhard von Bülow	20. Oktober 1897 – 16 October 1900	None
Secretary for the Justice	Rudolf Arnold Nieberding	10 July 1893 – 25 October 1909	None
Secretary for the Navy	Friedrich von Hollmann	22 April 1890 – 18 June 1897	None
Secretary for the Navy	Alfred von Tirpitz	18 June 1897 – 15 March 1916	None
Secretary for the Post	Heinrich von Stephan	20 March 1890 – 1 July 1897	None
Secretary for the Post	Victor von Podbielski	1 July 1897 – 6 May 1901	None
Secretary for the Treasury	Arthur von Posadowsky-Wehner	1 September 1893 – 1 July 1897	None
Secretary for the Treasury	Max von Thielmann	1 July 1897 – 23 August 1903	None

Chlodwig zu Hohenlohe-Schillingsfürst remained at Strasbourg until October 1894, when, at the urgent request of the Emperor William II, he consented, in spite of his advanced years, to accept the chancellorship as Caprivi's successor. The Kaiser's "great friend" Philipp, Prince of Eulenburg wanted his cousin Botho zu Eulenburg to be Caprivi's replacement, but Friedrich von Holstein, the head of the political department of the German Foreign Office, was able to persuade William II not to appoint Eulenburg as chancellor. However, Philipp, Prince of Eulenburg then managed to convince the emperor to appoint the aged Chlodwig zu Hohenlohe-Schillingsfürst, who was the German ambassador to France in 1881 when Eulenburg served in the Paris embassy, as the new chancellor. During this time, Eulenburg repeatedly advised Wilhelm that the best man to be chancellor was Bernhard von Bülow, whom Eulenburg painted in the most glowing terms; he wrote in February 1895 to Wilhelm saying that "Bernhard is the most valuable servant Your Imperial Majesty possesses, the predestined Reich Chancellor of the future".

The events of Hohenlohe's chancellorship belong to the general history of Germany; as regards the inner history of this time the editor of his memoirs has suppressed the greater part of the detailed comments which the prince left behind him. In general, during his term of office, the personality of the chancellor was less conspicuous in public affairs than in the case of either of his predecessors. His appearances in the Prussian and German parliaments were rare, and great independence was left to the secretaries of state.

Chlodwig von Hohenlohe appointed the Foreign Secretary Adolf Marschall von Bieberstein as Prussian Minister of State. He served also as a support in the Prussian cabinet and as his mouthpiece in the Reichstag. Bieberstein was increasingly involved in disputes with William II, who aspired to have a greater personal influence on foreign policy. He was also opposed by the Agrarians because he advocated the reduction of corn duties. In 1897, he was dismissed from both his offices and replaced by Bernhard von Bülow. In the same year William II initiated numerous reshuffles. Among them was the appointment of Alfred von Tirpitz as head of the German Imperial Naval Office. In sum, the imperial personnel policy meant a de facto disempowerment of Chlodwig von Hohenlohe. He was no longer able to halt the transition to an increasingly imperialist German world politics and the naval armaments. The rapprochement with Russia and the deterioration of relations with Great Britain (Kruger telegram in 1896, Samoan crisis in 1899) ran past him, same as the response to the Boxer Rebellion.

Only cautiously, Chlodwig von Hohenlohe ventured an at least internal opposition to the imperial intervention in the affairs of state. In particular he initiated a reform of the Prussian Military Law (1898) and the Law on Associations (1899). During his tenure also the Bürgerliches Gesetzbuch was adopted (1896). Chlodwig resigned the chancellorship on 17 October 1900 and was succeeded by Bernhard von Bülow.

=== Death ===
Chlodwig died on 6 July 1901 at Bad Ragaz aged 82.

=== Marriage and family ===
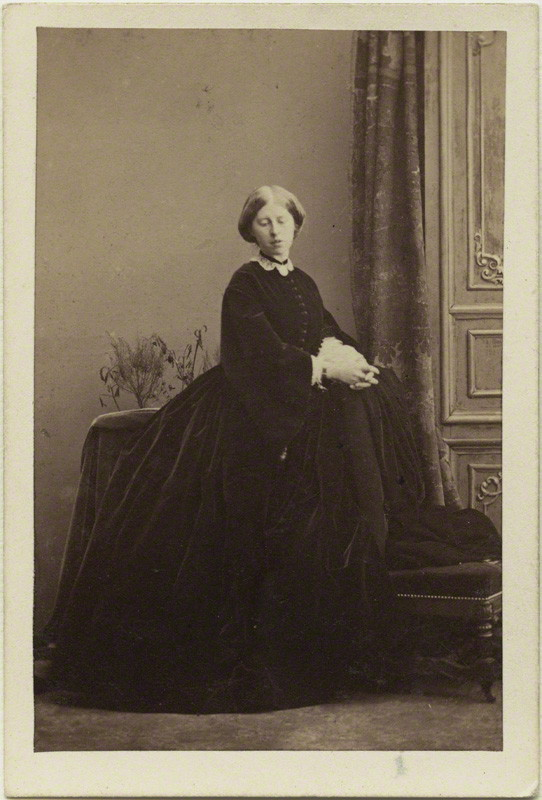
Marie, Princess of Hohenlohe-Schillingsfürst, 1860s, by Camille Silvy

On 16 February 1847 at Rödelheim Chlodwig married Princess Marie of Sayn-Wittgenstein-Sayn (Saint Petersburg, 16 February 1829 – Berlin, 11 December 1897), daughter of Ludwig Adolf Friedrich, 2nd Prince of Sayn-Wittgenstein-Sayn (the son of Russian field marshal Ludwig Adolf Peter, 1st Prince of Sayn-Wittgenstein-Berleburg-Ludwigsburg) and his first wife Princess Caroline (Stephanie) Radziwill. Marie was the heiress to vast estates in Imperial Russia. This led to two prolonged visits to Verkiai, Lithuania from 1851 to 1853 and again in 1860 in connection with the management of these properties.

Chlodwig and Marie had six children:

- Elisabeth Constanze Leonille Stephanie (Schillingsfürst, 30 November 1847 – Alt-Aussee, 26 October 1915)
- Stephanie Marie Antonie (Schillingsfürst, 6 July 1851 – Munich, 18 March 1882); married (Schillingsfürst, 12 April 1871) Count Arthur von Schönborn-Wiesentheid (Würzburg, 30 January 1846 – Wiesentheid, 29 September 1915)
- Philipp Ernst, 4th Prince of Hohenlohe-Schillingsfürst (Schillingsfürst, 5 June 1853 – Bad Reichenhall, 26 December 1915); married 1st (Vienna, 10 January 1882) Princess Chariclée Ypsilanti (Paris, 8 October 1863 – Schillingsfürst, 22 June 1912); married 2nd morganatically (Edinburgh, 6 August 1913) Henriette Gindra, created Frau von Hellberg 10 July 1914 (Vienna, 7 October 1884 – Innsbruck, 15 May 1952)
- Albert (Schillingsfürst, 14 October 1857 – Munich, 13 April 1866)
- Moritz, 5th Prince of Hohenlohe-Schillingsfürst (Lindau, 6 August 1862 – Schillingsfürst, 27 February 1940); married (Dyck, 19 August 1893) Altgravine Rosa of Salm-Reifferscheidt-Krautheim and Dyck (Herrschberg am Bodensee, 12 April 1868 – Munich, 1 December 1942)
- Alexander (Lindau, 6 August 1862 – Badenweiler, 16 May 1924); married (Cologne, 16 May 1895) Emanuela Gallone dei Principi di Tricase Moliterno (Naples, 19 February 1854 – Naples, 26 March 1936)

== Honours ==
He received the following orders and decorations:

- House of Hohenlohe: Knight of the House Order of the Phoenix, 1st Class
- Prussia:
  - Grand Cross of the Red Eagle, 16 May 1870
  - Knight of the Black Eagle, 5 December 1878; with Collar, 1879; in Brilliants, 1 October 1900
  - Grand Commander's Cross of the Royal House Order of Hohenzollern, 1896; with Star, 15 June 1898
  - Red Cross Medal, 1st Class, 27 January 1899
- (Duchy of Anhalt) Anhalt: Grand Cross of the Order of Albert the Bear
- (Austrian Empire) (Kingdom of Hungary) Austria-Hungary:
  - Grand Cross of the Royal Hungarian Order of St. Stephen, 1868; in Brilliants, 1900
  - Knight of the Golden Fleece, 1896
- Bavaria:
  - Grand Cross of Merit of the Bavarian Crown, 1868
  - Knight of St. Hubert, 1870
- Baden:
  - Knight of the House Order of Fidelity, 1887
  - Knight of the Order of Berthold the First, 1887
- (Saxe-Coburg and Gotha) (Duchy of Saxe-Altenburg) (Saxe-Meiningen) Ernestine duchies: Grand Cross of the Saxe-Ernestine House Order
- France: Grand Cross of the Legion of Honour, July 1878
- Italy: Knight of the Supreme Order of the Most Holy Annunciation, 22 March 1897
- Sovereign Military Order of Malta: Knight of Honour and Devotion
- Mecklenburg: Grand Cross of the Wendish Crown, with Crown in Ore
- Netherlands: Grand Cross of the Netherlands Lion
- Oldenburg: Grand Cross of the Order of Duke Peter Friedrich Ludwig, with Crown in Gold
- Ottoman Empire: Order of Osmanieh, 1st Class in Brilliants
- Tunisia: Grand Cordon of the Order of Glory
- Portugal: Grand Cross of the Tower and Sword, with Collar
- Russia: Knight of St. Andrew the Apostle the First-called, May 1874
- San Marino: Grand Cross of the Order of San Marino
- Saxe-Weimar-Eisenach: Grand Cross of the White Falcon, 1880
- Saxony: Knight of the Rue Crown, 1895
- Spain: Grand Cross of the Order of Charles III, with Collar, 11 January 1886
- Holy See: Grand Cross of St. Gregory the Great
- Württemberg: Grand Cross of the Württemberg Crown, 1867

== Ancestry ==
Ancestors of Chlodwig, Prince of Hohenlohe-Schillingsfürst

8. Karl Albrecht I, 2nd Prince of Hohenlohe-Waldenburg-Schillingsfürst
4. Karl Albrecht II, 3rd Prince of Hohenlohe-Waldenburg-Schillingsfürst
9. Princess Sophie of Löwenstein-Wertheim-Rochefort
2. Franz Joseph, 1st Prince of Hohenlohe-Schillingsfürst
10. Baron Johann Kazimir Reviczky de Revisnye
5. Baroness Judith Reviczky de Revisnye
11. Baroness Rosalie Perényi de Perény
1. Chlodwig, 3rd Prince of Hohenlohe-Schillingsfürst
12. Christian Albrecht, 2nd Prince of Hohenlohe-Langenburg
6. Karl Ludwig, 3rd Prince of Hohenlohe-Langenburg
13. Countess Caroline of Stolberg-Gedern
3. Princess Constanze of Hohenlohe-Langenburg
14. Johann Christian II, Count of Solms-Baruth
7. Countess Amalie Henriette of Solms-Baruth
15. Countess Friederike Reuss of Köstritz

== Works ==
- Memoirs, 2 vols. (English tr., 1906)

Chlodwig, 3rd Prince of Hohenlohe-Schillingsfürst House of Hohenlohe-Schillingsfürst Cadet branch of the House of Hohenlohe Born: 31 March 1819 Died: 6 July 1901
German nobility
Preceded by Philipp Ernst	Prince of Hohenlohe-Schillingsfürst; 3 May 1845 – 6 July 1901	Succeeded by Philipp Ernst
Political offices
Preceded by Baron Karl Ludwig von der Pfordten	Minister-President of Bavaria; 1866–1870	Succeeded by Count Otto von Bray-Steinburg
Preceded by Count Botho zu Eulenburg	Prime Minister of Prussia; 1894–1900	Succeeded by Prince Bernhard von Bülow
Preceded by Count Leo von Caprivi	Chancellor of Germany; 1894–1900	Succeeded by Prince Bernhard von Bülow
