= Bernhard Ernst von Bülow =

Danish and German politician (1815–1879)

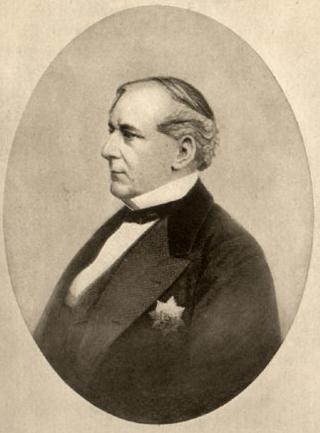

State Secretary for Foreign Affairs
- In office 9 October 1873 – 20 October 1879
- Monarch: Wilhelm I
- Chancellor: Otto von Bismarck
- Preceded by: Hermann Ludwig von Balan
- Succeeded by: Joseph Maria von Radowitz

Personal details
- Born: 2 August 1815 Cismar, Duchy of Holstein
- Died: 20 October 1879 (aged 64) Frankfurt am Main, Kingdom of Prussia, German Empire
- Spouse: Louise Rücker
- Children: 8
- Parents: Adolf von Bülow (father); Countess Susanne von Baudissin (mother)
- Occupation: Diplomat

Bernhard Ernst von Bülow (2 August 1815 – 20 October 1879) was a Danish and German statesman. He was the father of German Chancellor Bernhard von Bülow.

== Early life ==
He was born at Cismar in Holstein, as the son of Adolf Heinrich Hartwig von Bülow (1787-1816), a Danish and German official, and his wife, Countess Susanne Auguste Adelheid Clara von Baudissin (b. 1790).

== Biography ==
He studied law at the universities of Berlin, Göttingen and Kiel, and began his political career in the service of Denmark, in the chancery of Schleswig-Holstein-Lauenburg at Copenhagen, and afterwards in the foreign office. In 1842 he became councillor of legation, and in 1847 Danish charge d'affaires in the Hanse towns, where his intercourse with the merchant princes led to his marriage in 1848 with a wealthy heiress, Louise Victorine Rücker. Their children included Bernhard, Adolf, Alfred and Waldemar (died age 2).

When the insurrection broke out in the Elbe duchies (1848) he left the Danish service, and offered his services to the provisional government of Kiel, an offer that was not accepted. In 1849, accordingly, he re-entered the service of Denmark, was appointed a royal chamberlain and in 1850 sent to represent the duchies of Schleswig and Holstein at the restored federal diet of Frankfurt. Here he came into intimate touch with Bismarck, who admired his statesmanlike handling of the growing complications of the Schleswig-Holstein Question. With the radical Eider-Dane party he was utterly out of sympathy; and when, in 1862, this party gained the upper hand, he was recalled from Frankfurt. He now entered the service of the Grand-duke of Mecklenburg-Strelitz, and remained at the head of the grand-ducal government until 1867, when he became plenipotentiary for the two Mecklenburg duchies in the council of the German Confederation (Bundesrat), where he distinguished himself by his successful defence of the medieval constitution of the duchies against Liberal attacks.

In 1873 Bismarck, who was in thorough sympathy with his views, persuaded him to enter the service of Prussia as secretary of state for foreign affairs, and from this time until his death he was the chancellor's most faithful henchman. In 1875, he was appointed Prussian plenipotentiary in the Bundesrat; in 1877 he became Bismarck's lieutenant in the secretaryship for foreign affairs of the Empire; and in 1878 he was, with Bismarck and Hohenlohe, Prussian plenipotentiary at the congress of Berlin. He died at Frankfurt on 20 October 1879, his end being hastened by his exertions in connection with the political crisis of that year. Of his six sons the eldest, Bernhard Heinrich Karl, became chancellor of the Empire.

== See also ==
- Eisenstück affair
