= Oswald von Richthofen =

German diplomat and politician (1847–1906)

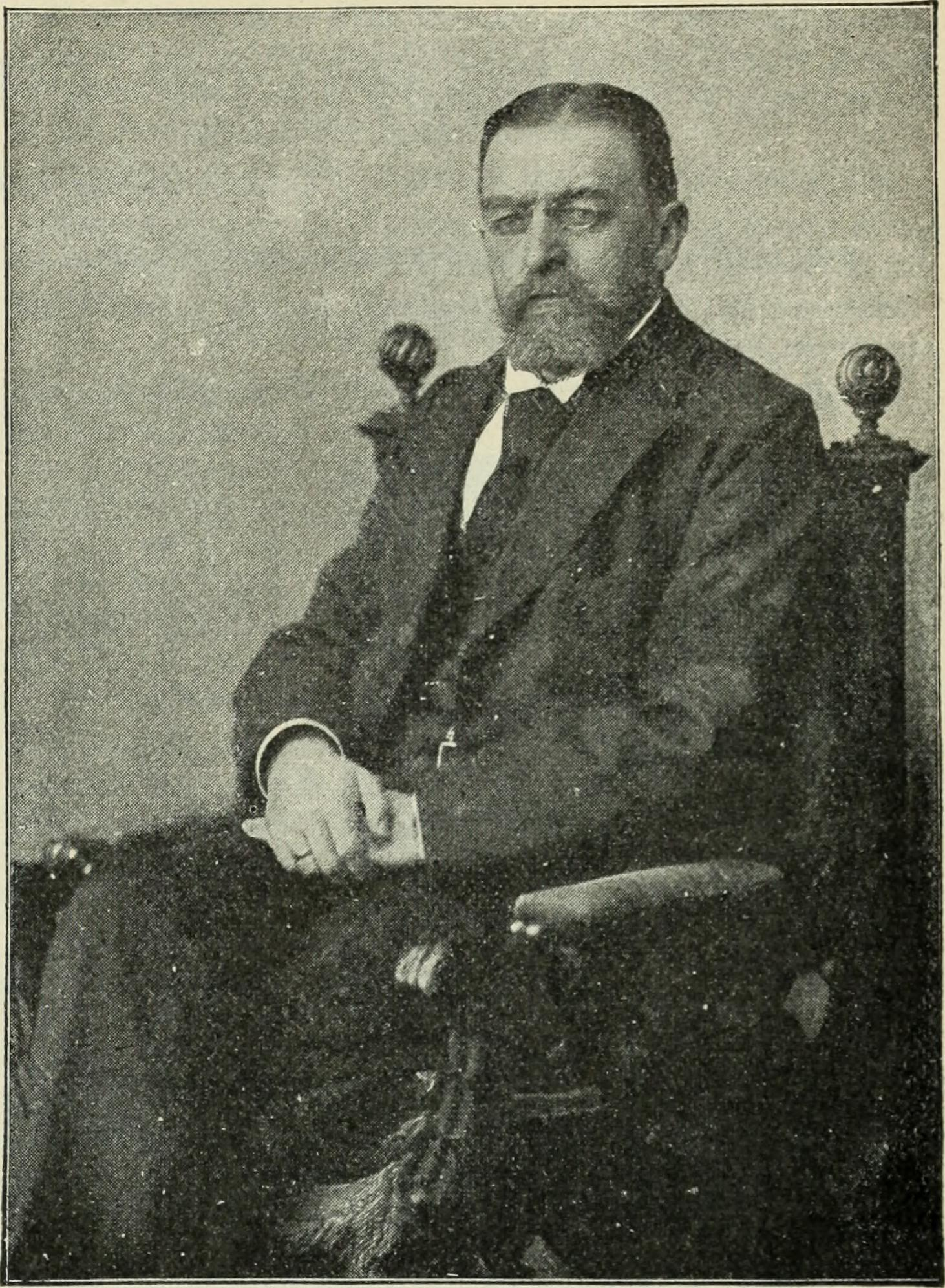

State Secretary for Foreign Affairs
- In office 23 October 1900 – 17 January 1906
- Monarch: Wilhelm II
- Chancellor: Bernhard von Bülow
- Preceded by: Bernhard von Bülow
- Succeeded by: Heinrich von Tschirschky

German General-Consul in Cairo
- In office 1885–1896
- Monarchs: Wilhelm I Frederick III; Wilhelm II
- Preceded by: Otto L. Schmidt-Leda
- Succeeded by: Maximilian von Loehr

Personal details
- Born: 13 October 1847 Iași, Principality of Moldavia
- Died: 17 January 1907 (aged 59) Berlin, German Empire
- Occupation: Diplomat

Oswald Samuel Konstantin Freiherr von Richthofen (13 October 1847 – 17 January 1906), a German diplomat and politician, served as Foreign Secretary and head of the Foreign Office from 23 October 1900 to 17 January 1906.

== Background and career ==
The son of diplomat Emil von Richthofen (1810–1895), he was born in Iaşi, where his father was Consul General. He joined the foreign service in 1875 and served in the Franco-Prussian War 1870–1871. From 1885 to 1896, he was stationed in Cairo. He served as Director of Colonial Affairs at the Foreign Office from 15 October 1896 to 31 March 1898. During his term as Director, the railway from Swakopmund to Windhoek in German South-West Africa was completed. A post office in the colony is named in his honour.

He was appointed Under-Secretary of Foreign Affairs in December 1897.

== Secretary of Foreign Affairs ==
Richthofen became Secretary on 23 October 1900, when he succeeded Bernhard von Bülow, who at the same time became Chancellor of Germany. He served as Secretary until his death in Berlin on 17 January 1906. He was also appointed Privy Councillor in 1901 and Minister of State of Prussia in 1905. On 24 January 1906, he was succeeded as Secretary by Heinrich Leonhard von Tschirschky und Bögendorff.

== Distinctions ==
He received the following orders and decorations:

German orders and decorations

- Prussia:
  - Iron Cross (1870), 2nd Class
  - Landwehr Service Medal, 2nd Class
  - Knight of the Red Eagle, 2nd Class with Crown and Star
  - Knight of the Crown Order, 1st Class, December 1902
- Baden:
  - Commander of the Order of Berthold the First, 1st Class, 1899
  - Grand Cross of the Zähringer Lion, with Oak Leaves
- Bavaria: Grand Cross of the Merit Order of St. Michael
- Brunswick: Commander of the Order of Henry the Lion, 2nd Class
- Grand Duchy of Hesse: Grand Cross of the Merit Order of Philip the Magnanimous
- Mecklenburg:
  - Grand Cross of the Wendish Crown, with Golden Crown
  - Grand Cross of the Griffon
- Oldenburg: Grand Cross of the Order of Duke Peter Friedrich Ludwig
- Saxe-Weimar-Eisenach: Grand Cross of the White Falcon
- Saxony: Grand Cross of the Albert Order, 1901; with Golden Star and Silver Crown
- Württemberg: Grand Cross of the Friedrich Order, with Swords

Foreign orders and decorations

- (Austrian Empire) (Kingdom of Hungary) Austria-Hungary:
  - Knight of the Iron Crown, 1st Class, 1900
  - Grand Cross of the Imperial Order of Leopold, 1902
- Belgium: Grand Cordon of the Order of Leopold
- Principality of Bulgaria: Grand Cross of the Civil Merit Order, in Diamonds
- Ethiopian Empire: Grand Cross of the Star of Ethiopia
- France: Commander of the Legion of Honour
- Kingdom of Greece: Grand Cross of the Redeemer
- Empire of Japan: Grand Cordon of the Rising Sun, September 1901
- Kingdom of Italy: Grand Cross of Saints Maurice and Lazarus, August 1902
- Luxembourg: Grand Cross of the Oak Crown
- Principality of Montenegro: Grand Cross of the Order of Prince Danilo I
- Netherlands: Grand Cross of the Netherlands Lion
- Ottoman Empire:
  - Order of Osmanieh, 1st Class in Diamonds
  - Order of the Medjidie, 1st Class
  - Order of Glory
- Persian Empire:
  - Order of the Lion and the Sun, 1st Class in Diamonds
  - Order of the August Portrait
- Kingdom of Portugal: Grand Cross of the Royal Military Order of Our Lord Jesus Christ
- Qing dynasty: Order of the Double Dragon, Class I Grade III
- Kingdom of Romania: Grand Cross of the Crown of Romania
- Russian Empire: Knight of St. Alexander Nevsky
- Kingdom of Serbia: Grand Cross of the White Eagle
- Spain:
  - Grand Cross of Isabella the Catholic, 23 June 1889
  - Grand Cross of the Order of Charles III
- Sweden-Norway: Commander of the Order of Vasa, 2nd Class, 12 July 1878
- United Kingdom: Honorary Grand Cross of the Royal Victorian Order, 1 July 1904
