= Adolf Marschall von Bieberstein =

German statesman (1842–1912)

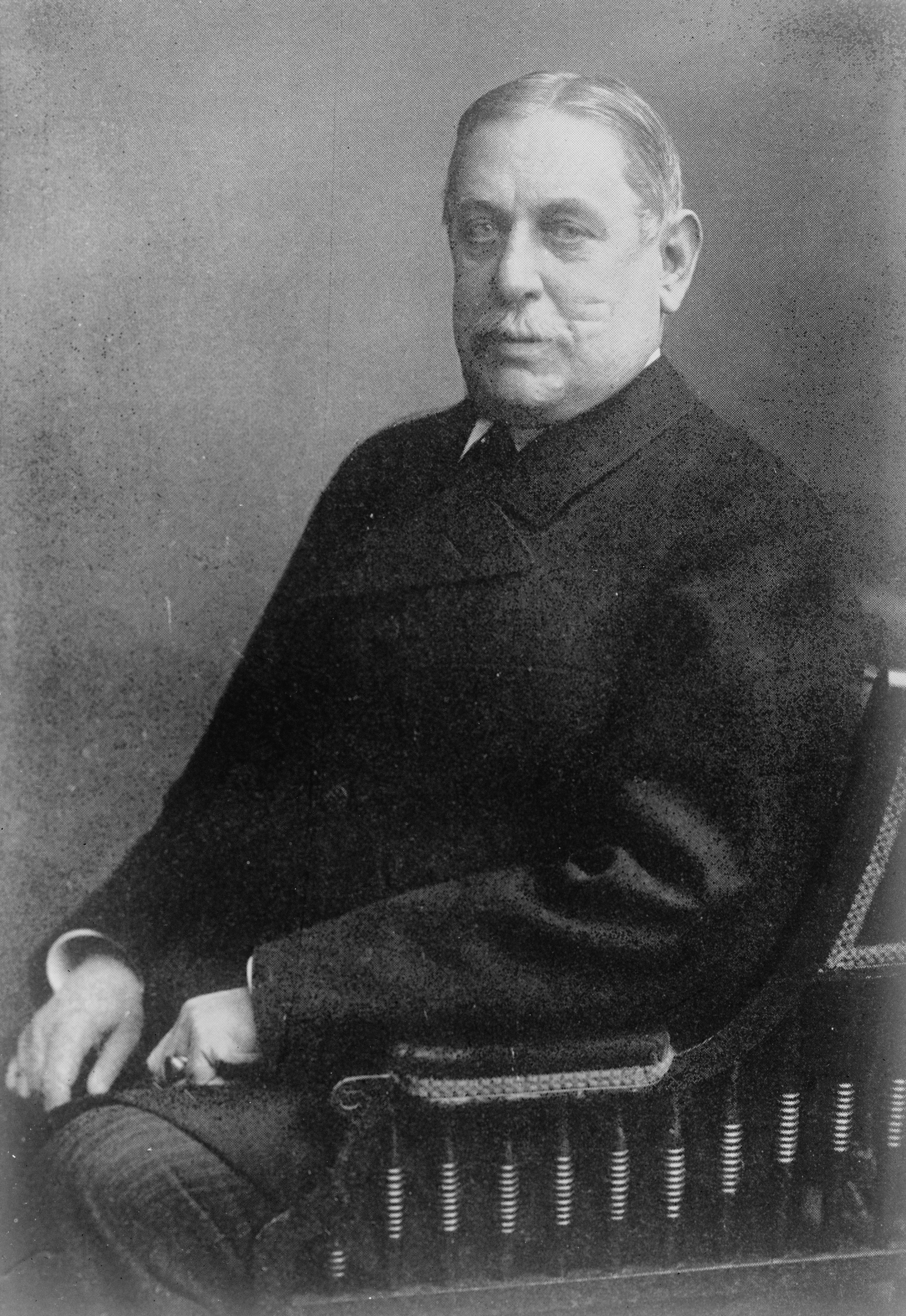
- Portrait of von Bieberstein

State Secretary for Foreign Affairs
- In office 31 March 1890 – 19 October 1897
- Monarch: Wilhelm II
- Chancellor: Leo von Caprivi; Chlodwig zu Hohenlohe-Schillingsfürst
- Preceded by: Herbert von Bismarck
- Succeeded by: Bernhard von Bülow

Personal details
- Born: 12 October 1842 Karlsruhe, Grand Duchy of Baden
- Died: 24 September 1912 (aged 69) Badenweiler, German Empire
- Party: German Conservative Party
- Education: University of Freiburg; University of Heidelberg
- Occupation: Diplomat, politician

Adolf Hermann Freiherr Marschall von Bieberstein (12 October 1842 – 24 September 1912) was a German politician and State Secretary of the Foreign Office of the German Empire.

== Biography ==
Marschall von Bieberstein's father, Augustus Friedrich Marschall von Bieberstein (1804–1888), was chamberlain to the Grand Duke of Baden, and his mother was Baroness Ida von Falkenstein (1810–1857). He was educated at the Gymnasium of Frankfurt am Main, and studied jurisprudence at the Universities of Freiburg and Heidelberg. He was a member of the Corps Suevia, a Studentenverbindung.

After finishing his studies, he started on a career in government, working as a prosecutor in Mosbach und Mannheim. His career as a politician began in 1875, as a representative in the First Chamber of Baden; from 1878 to 1881 he was also a member of the Reichstag for the German Conservative Party and at first supported Bismarck, but then he undertook an oppositional stance towards Bismarck, after the latter turned towards the conservatives in 1879. From 1883 to 1890 Marschall von Bieberstein was the envoy of the Grand Duchy of Baden in Berlin, and participated in the fall of Bismarck in 1890.

In 1890 he succeeded Herbert von Bismarck as State Secretary of the Foreign Office under Otto von Bismarck's successor Leo von Caprivi. When he first assumed office, he incurred the enmity of Bismarck by refusing his advice. The result was a fierce press campaign against Marschall von Bieberstein. He supported Caprivi's reconciliation policy through trade agreements and sought compromise with Britain. After Caprivi's dismissal in 1894, Marschall von Bieberstein succeeded him as Foreign Minister of Prussia while remaining State Secretary under the new Chancellor Chlodwig zu Hohenlohe-Schillingsfürst.

Marschall von Bieberstein was increasingly involved in disputes with Wilhelm II, who aspired to have a greater personal influence on foreign policy. He was also opposed by the Agrarians because he advocated the reduction of corn duties. In 1897, he was dismissed from both his offices and replaced by Bernhard von Bülow.

Marschall von Bieberstein was transferred to Constantinople as ambassador. Through economic co-operation between the German and the Ottoman Empire, he wanted to extend Germany's relations with the Orient. The Baghdad Railway played a central role in this. Thanks to Marschall von Bieberstein's efforts, a predominantly German consortium received the concession to build the Baghdad Railway.

Marschall von Bieberstein was the representative of the German Empire at the Second Peace Conference in The Hague in 1907. An advocate of a strong naval policy for Germany, he was the exponent of Germany's resolute and successful opposition to any practical discussion of the question of restriction of armaments.

In 1912, shortly prior to his death, he became ambassador in London. He received the task to achieve a turnaround in the tense Anglo-German relations. Shortly after taking office, however, he died on 24 September 1912, aged 69.
