= Felix Busch =

German administrative lawyer (1871–1938)

Felix Busch (formerly Felix Emil Johannes Friedländer; August 18, 1871 in Constantinople – August 16, 1938 near Tutzing) was a German administrative lawyer whose family was persecuted by the Nazis because of their Jewish heritage.

== Life ==
Busch's ancestors, Friedländer, converted from the Jewish to the Protestant faith at the beginning of the 19th century. Felix was the son of Justus Friedländer, the German consul in Istanbul and Constantinople, and grandson of Benoni Friedländer. His mother married the diplomat Clemens Busch, who adopted ten-year-old Felix in 1881.

=== Education ===
After private lessons, Busch attended the Royal Wilhelm Gymnasium in Berlin and the Pforta State School from 1885 to 1890. After graduating from high school, he studied law and political science at Heidelberg University from 1890, from 1891 at LMU Munich and the Humboldt University of Berlin. In 1893, he became a member of the Corps Guestphalia Heidelberg. After the legal traineeship in May 1893, he received his doctorate on August 2, 1893, in Heidelberg. As a one-year volunteer, he served in 1893/94 in the (Prussian) 1st Badische Leib-Dragoons Regiment No. 20 in Karlsruhe.

=== Career ===
From October 1894 he worked as a trainee lawyer at the Spandau district court. Busch examined inheritance habits of agricultural property in the province of West Prussia. These were published in 1910. After he had passed the Grand State Examination on February 24, 1900, he was appointed government assessor on April 5, 1900.

In the summer of 1900, Busch visited several industrial areas in Great Britain, including London and Edinburgh. In 1901, he took a leave of absence and worked as a trainee at the Norddeutsche Bank in Hamburg, the Hamburg stock exchange and the Disconto-Gesellschaft in Berlin. During this time he dealt with economics and learned the English language.

In March, he was assigned to the Herford District Office as a government assessor responsible for social security and military replacement business as well as police matters. In April 1902 he became a department head at the high presidium of the Province of Poznan. From November 1904 he was responsible for national political affairs in the Ministry of the Interior.

On June 17, 1905, he was initially assigned the provisional administration of the Hörde district office in the Arnsberg administrative region. On December 13 of the same year he was appointed district administrator. He mediated several strikes in the mining industry, campaigned for an improvement in poultry farming and the electricity and water supply, as well as for the establishment of public libraries.

On February 14, 1906, Busch Marie Fanny married Margarete von Mendelssohn-Bartholdy from the Mendelssohn-Bartholdy family.

After working for four years in the Prussian Ministry of Finance, he was accepted on July 1, 1911, as Geh. Upper Government Councilor (initially provisional) District Administrator of the Niederbarnim district. He fought against the Greater Berlin Act and promoted the improvement of gas, water and energy supplies.

=== World War I and Weimar ===
The outbreak of World War I put an end to these activities. Instead, war relief had to be organized and the work of various charities coordinated. In 1916, Busch and his colleague in the Teltow district, Adolf von Achenbach, wrote a memorandum to the Ministry of the Interior in which they criticized the system of self-government in cities, districts and communities. As a result, the Prussian District Association was founded.

On August 30, 1917, Busch took up the post of Undersecretary in the Ministry of Finance.

== Nazi era ==
In 1933, with the rise of the Nazis to power in Germany, the Busch family was persecuted. Busch was forced by the National Socialists to sell his estate in Büssow near Friedeberg (Neumark). He moved to Tutzing on Lake Starnberg with his wife. Here he wrote his autobiography "From the life of a royal Prussian district administrator" from 1933 to 1936. The historian Julius H. Schoeps, the grandson of Felix Busch, published the edition with comments in 1991.

The daughters Charlotte Busch and Dorothee Busch emigrated during the National Socialist era. The Busch art collection was seized by the Gestapo.

Busch took his own life by jumping out of a moving train near Tutzing. Three days later, on August 19, 1938, he was buried in Tutzing.

== Honors ==
- Roter Adlerorden IV. Klasse (23. Januar 1907)
- Preußischer Kronenorden III. Klasse (18. Januar 1911)
- Geh. Oberfinanzrat (7. August 1911)
- Buschallee in Berlin-Weißensee

=== Honorary positions ===
- Vorsitzender des Verbandes deutscher öffentlich-rechtlicher Kreditanstalten
- Aufsichtsratsvorsitzender der Deutschen Landesbankenzentrale
- Mitglied des Vorläufigen Reichswirtschaftsrats

== Literature ==
- Reichshandbuch der deutschen Gesellschaft – Das Handbuch der Persönlichkeiten in Wort und Bild. Erster Band, Deutscher Wirtschaftsverlag, Berlin 1930, ISBN 3-598-30664-4
- Julius H. Schoeps (Hrsg.): Felix Busch: Aus dem Leben eines königlich-preußischen Landrats. Verlag für Berlin-Brandenburg, Potsdam 2000, ISBN 3-932981-20-0.
- Claudia Wilke: Die Landräte der Kreise Teltow und Niederbarnim im Kaiserreich. Verlag für Berlin-Brandenburg, Potsdam 1998, ISBN 3-930850-70-2.
- Irena Strelow: System und Methode: NS-Raubkunst in deutschen Museen, Heinrich & Heinrich, ISBN 978-3955652463

== Links ==
- Frühe Dokumente und Zeitungsartikel zur Deutsche Landesbankenzentrale AG in der Pressemappe 20. Jahrhundert der ZBW – Leibniz-Informationszentrum Wirtschaft.

== See also ==
- Mendelssohn Bartholdy family
- Aryanization
- The Holocaust
