= Heinrich von Tschirschky =

German diplomat and politician (1858–1916)

Heinrich von Tschirschky und Bögendorff
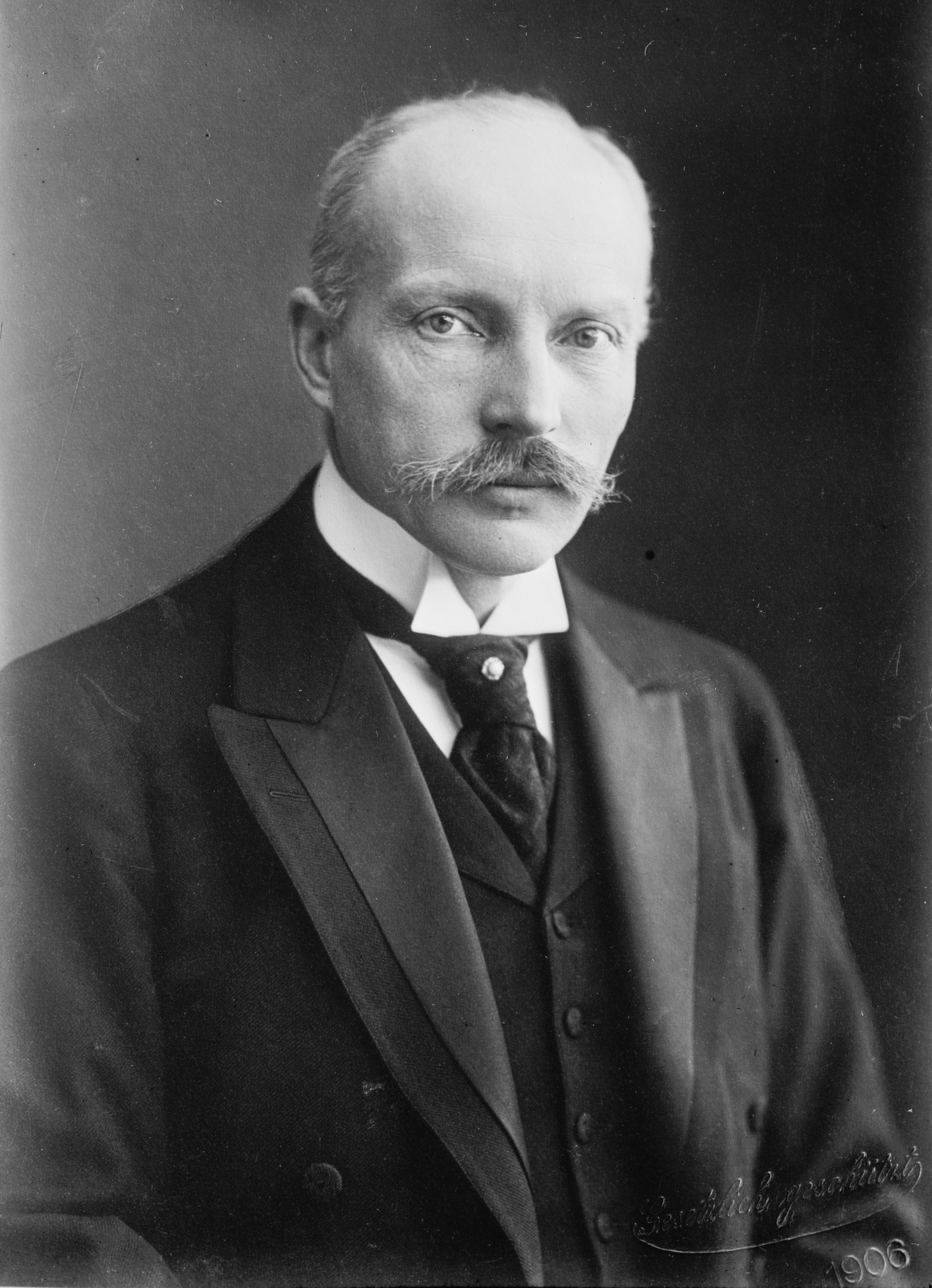

German Ambassador to Austria-Hungary
- In office 25 October 1907 – 15 November 1916
- Monarch: Wilhelm II
- Preceded by: Karl von Wedel
- Succeeded by: Botho von Wedel

State Secretary for Foreign Affairs
- In office 24 January 1906 – 25 October 1907
- Monarch: Wilhelm II
- Chancellor: Bernhard von Bülow
- Preceded by: Oswald von Richthofen
- Succeeded by: Wilhelm von Schoen

Personal details
- Born: 15 August 1858 Dresden, Kingdom of Saxony
- Died: 15 November 1916 (aged 58) Vienna, Austria-Hungary
- Spouse: Baroness Maria Stummer von Tavarnok
- Children: 3
- Occupation: Diplomat

Heinrich Leonhard von Tschirschky und Bögendorff (15 August 1858 – 15 November 1916) was a German diplomat and politician, who served as Foreign Secretary and head of the Foreign Office from 24 January 1906 to 25 October 1907.

== Early life ==
Born in Dresden, he was the son of Otto von Tschirschky und Bögendorff, the Director-General of the Royal Saxon State Railways, and a member of the Tschirschky noble family.

== Career ==
He joined the German foreign service in 1883, and served from 1885 to 1886 as personal secretary to Herbert von Bismarck. He was subsequently stationed in Vienna, Athens, Bern, Constantinople and St. Petersburg, before he became Minister Resident in Luxembourg in 1900, Prussian Envoy to Mecklenburg and the Hanse city-states in 1902. He also accompanied Emperor William on travels as a representative of the Foreign Office.

=== Foreign Secretary ===
On 17 January 1906, he was appointed Secretary of State, succeeding the late Oswald von Richthofen. He served until October 1907, when he was succeeded by Wilhelm von Schoen. Shortly before the start of his term of office, the Algeciras Conference took place on 16 January 1906, at which the solution to the First Moroccan Crisis was decided. When, contrary to the original agreements, Franco-Spanish naval actions took place off Morocco at the end of 1906, he declared in the Reichstag in Berlin on 7 December 1906 that the Reich government saw no reason to intervene because of the naval actions. On the same day, the French National Assembly passed the Algeciras Act.

As foreign minister, he also signed the so-called Optant Agreement with his Danish colleague Johan Henrik von Hegermann-Lindencrone on 11 January 1907. He eliminated the tensions that had existed in the North Schleswig border region since the German-Danish War of 1864. The agreement gave a small group of Danes in North Schleswig the option to choose between German and Danish citizenship.

=== Ambassador in Vienna ===
After his term as Foreign Secretary, he was appointed Ambassador to Vienna, and served until his death there in 1916. on 13 December 1913, he discussed a war against France and Russia with representatives of the Triple Alliance (the German Empire, Austro-Hungary, Italy). He and the Austro-Hungarian Chief of Staff, Franz Conrad von Hötzendorf, took the view that the situation of the Triple Alliance in Europe would deteriorate. On the other side would be the Triple Entente, between the Russian Empire, the French Third Republic, and the United Kingdom of Great Britain and Ireland, who joined forces.

== Personal life ==
On 20 November 1888, Heinrich married Baroness Maria Josephine Karoline Alexandrine Stummer von Tavarnok (Vienna, 17 May 1868 – Mayrhofen, 29 October 1948) in Felsö Bodok. Together, they had three daughters:

- Maria Elisabeth Hedwig Josefa Auguste (Vienna, 3 November 1889 – Cologne, 19 June 1975), who married Prince Hermann von Hatzfeldt zu Trachenberg, the German Embassy Counselor who was the eldest son of Prince Hermann von Hatzfeldt, a Prussian politician, in 1912.
- Alexandra Auguste (Vienna, 1 November 1890 – Salzburg, 23 March 1948), as Sister Angela in the Eucharistie-Schwestern.
- Marie Henriette Johanna Hedwig Augusta (Tsarskoye Selo (Pushkin), 10 August 1897 – 1991), who married Friedrich von Goertz.

== Orders and decorations ==
- Monaco: Grand Cross of St. Charles, 14 April 1907
- Russian Empire: Knight of St. Alexander Nevsky, 22 July 1907
