= Grömitz =

- Municipality
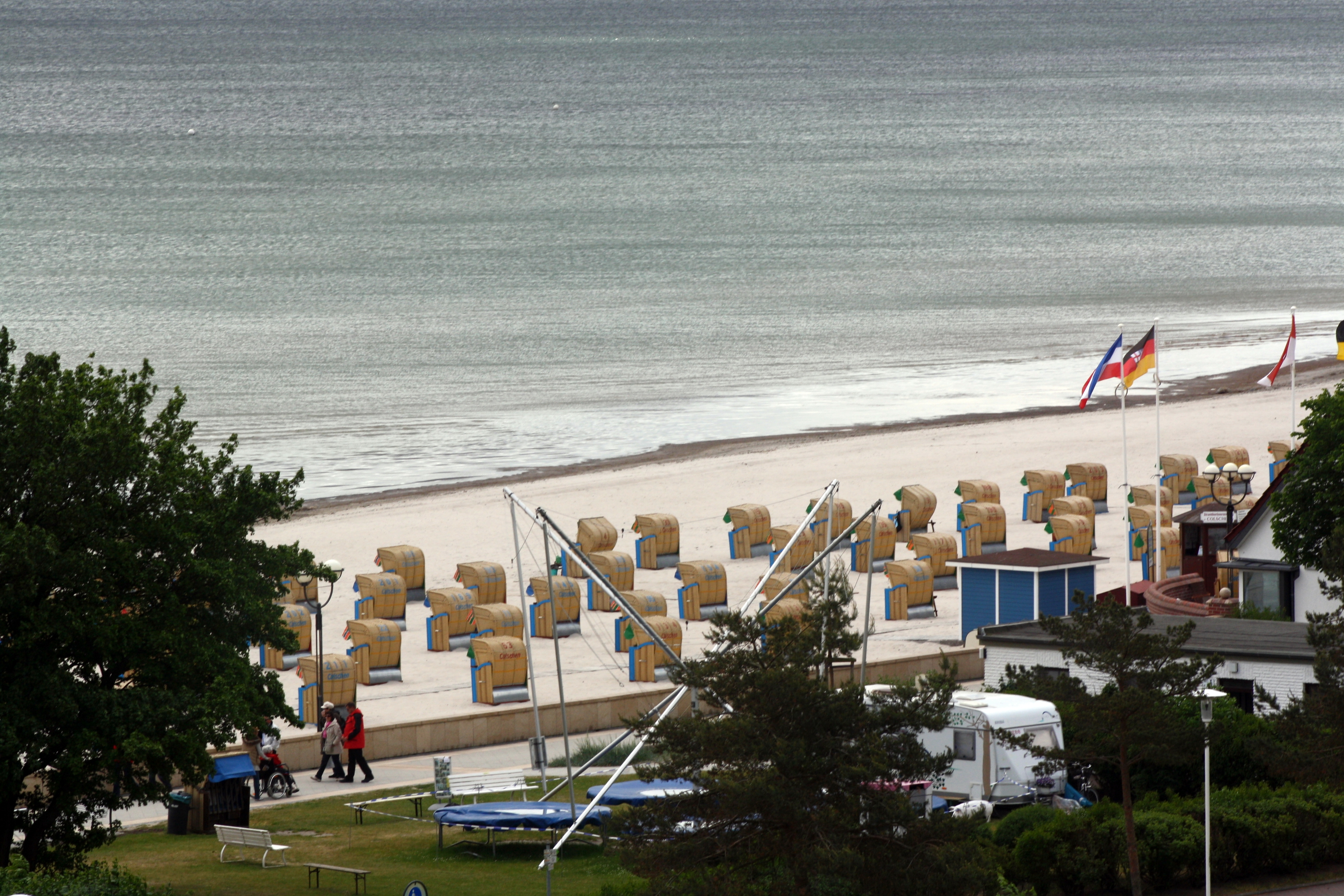

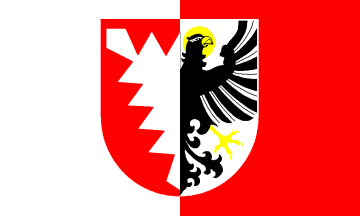
- Flag Coat of arms

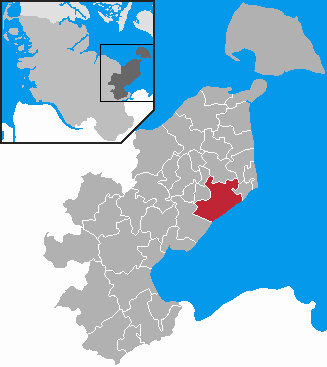
- Location of Grömitz within Ostholstein district
- Interactive map of Grömitz
- Location within Germany Location within Schleswig-Holstein
- Coordinates: 54°09′13″N 10°57′27″E
- Country: Germany
- State: Schleswig-Holstein
- District: Ostholstein

Government
  - Mayor: Mark Burmeister

Area
  - Total: 51.08 km^{2} (19.72 sq mi)
- Elevation: 14 m (46 ft)

Population (2025-12-31)
  - Total: 6,856
  - Density: 134.2/km^{2} (347.6/sq mi)
- Time zone: UTC+01:00 (CET)
  - Summer (DST): UTC+02:00 (CEST)
- Postal codes: 23743
- Dialling codes: 04562
- Vehicle registration: OH
- Website: www.groemitz.eu

Grömitz (German pronunciation: [ˈɡʁøːmɪts]) is a municipality in the district of Ostholstein, in Schleswig-Holstein, Germany. It is situated on the Bay of Lübeck, approximately 35 km northeast of Lübeck, and 23 km east of Eutin.

Grömitz is a settlement on the Baltic Sea. In fair weather one can see buildings on the about 15 kilometer distant shore.

The town name contains the Slavic root grom ("thunder") and means "a place of thunder".

The sei whale was described after a whale stranded near Grömitz in 1829.

There were three ligers in the local zoo, but the last one had to be put to rest in February 2008.

== Notable people ==
- Bernhard Ernst von Bülow (1815–1879), Danish and German statesman
