= Hermann Ludwig von Balan =

German diplomat (1812–1874)

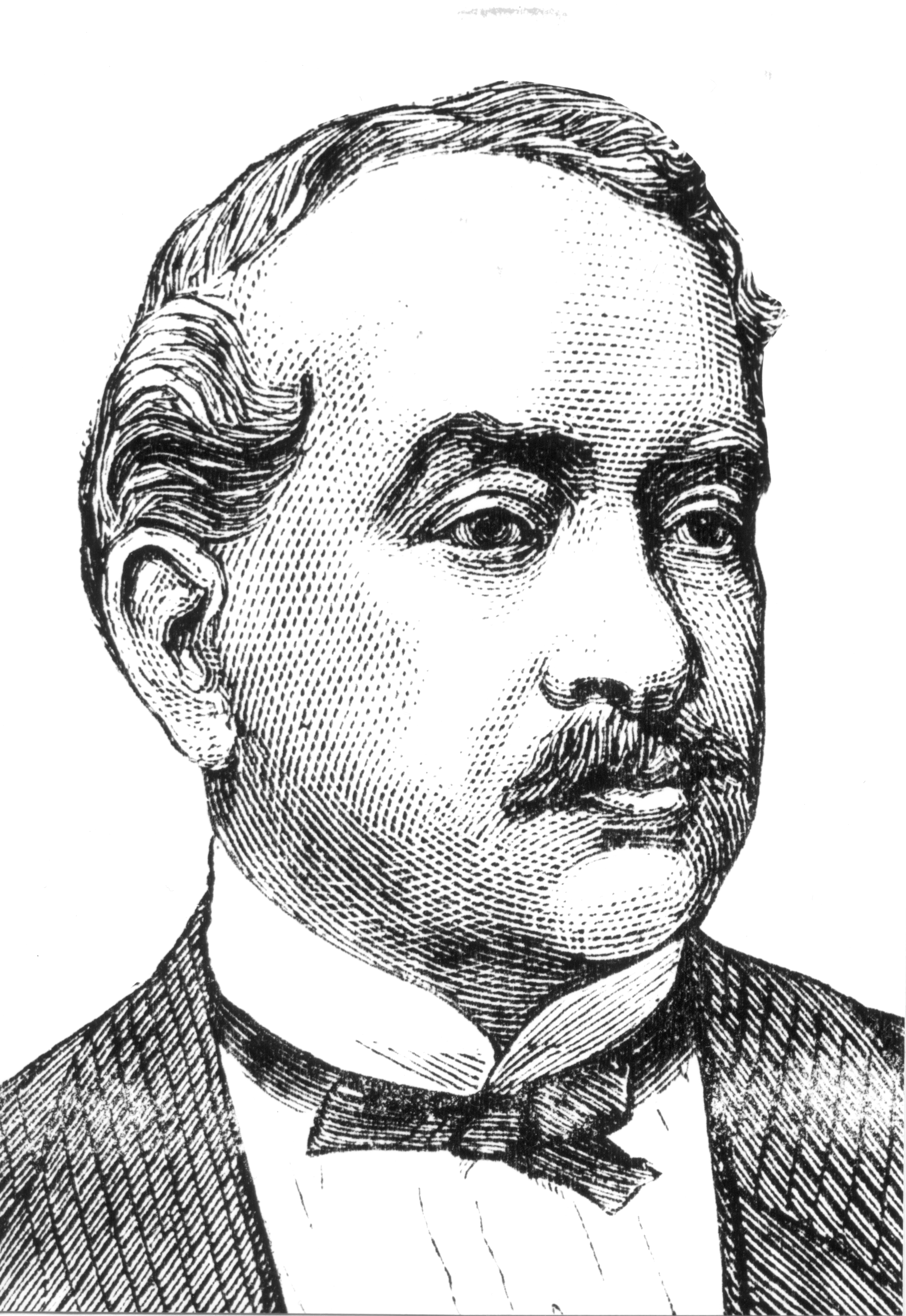

State Secretary for Foreign Affairs
- In office 3 October 1872 – 9 October 1873
- Monarch: Wilhelm I
- Chancellor: Otto von Bismarck
- Preceded by: Hermann von Thile
- Succeeded by: Bernhard Ernst von Bülow

Personal details
- Born: 7 March 1812 Berlin, Kingdom of Prussia
- Died: 16 March 1874 (aged 62) Brussels, Belgium
- Spouse: Emilie Auguste Cäcilie Therese von Sybel
- Children: 2
- Occupation: Diplomat

Hermann Ludwig von Balan (7 March 1812 – 16 March 1874) was a German diplomat who served as acting Foreign Secretary and head of the Foreign Office from 1872 to 1873.

== Career ==
A lawyer by profession, he joined the diplomatic service of the Kingdom of Prussia in 1833. He was appointed as Consul General in Warsaw in 1845, and as chargé d'affaires to the Free City of Frankfurt the following year. In 1848 he became chargé d'affaires to the Grand Duchy of Hesse. He became Envoy to the Kingdom of Württemberg in 1858, and was ennobled in 1859.

From 1859 to 1864, he was Envoy to the Kingdom of Denmark and took part in the negotiation of the 1864 Treaty of Vienna that concluded the Second Schleswig War. He served as Ambassador to Belgium from 1864 to 1871.

When he was succeeded by Bernhard Ernst von Bülow as Foreign Secretary, he was appointed to the Prussian House of Lords, where he was considered a liberal peer, and returned to his post as ambassador in Brussels. However, he died a few months later.
