= Emil von Richthofen =

Prussian baron

Emil Karl Heinrich von Richthofen (11 July 1810 – 20 June 1895, at Baden-Baden), was a Prussian baron (freiherr) and diplomat. He was the son of Ludwig Philipp Heinrich, Freiherr von Richthofen (1770–1850).

In 1833, he married Marie Augustin in Potsdam. After joining the Prussian diplomatic service, his first posting was in 1846 as the Prussian Consul General in Jassy (Iași), capital of the semi-independent principality of Moldavia. His son Oswald von Richthofen, the future Imperial German foreign minister, was born in Jassy in 1847.

From 1851 to 1856 he was the Prussian Minister (envoy) to Mexico, later publishing the works Die politischen Zustände der Republik Mexiko (The political conditions of the Republic of Mexico) in 1859 and Die mexikanische Frage in 1862. In July 1855 he secured a treaty of friendship, commerce and navigation between Mexico and Prussia (and the other states of the Zollverein).

Despite being neutral in the Crimean War, Prussia participated in the Congress of Paris (1856) which brought that conflict to an end. One of its provisions was the re-organisation of the Danubian Principalities of Wallachia and Moldavia, under the supervision of the European great powers. Emil von Richthofen was appointed the Prussian representative on the commission established for this purpose.

In 1859 he became the Prussian envoy to the Hanseatic free cities of Hamburg, Bremen and Lübeck and to the two Mecklenburg states. During this time he organised a visit to Hamburg by the fledgling Prussian Navy, led by Prince Adalbert of Prussia, to whom he was appointed Premier Lieutenant and Personal Adjutant.

During the crisis of 1866 which resulted in the Austro-Prussian War, he applied pressure on Hamburg which forced it (and the other Hanseatic cities) to join the new federation proposed by Prussia (North German Federation). Richthofen had to persuade the Senate of Hamburg to give in to Prussia's demands – to break off relations with those hostile to Prussia, to send a military contingent to assist Prussia and to agree to a new close federation under Prussia's control. On 24 June 1866, he visited two prominent members of Hamburg's House of Burgesses (Burgerschaft), Isaac Wolffson (former President of the Burgerschaft and member of the Right party) and Johannes Halben (leader of the Left party), to inform them of the intended rejection of the Prussian proposals by the Senate. He pointed out that Prussia would not accept a refusal without further action. He mentioned that Prussia would dissolve the Senate and take over the government. The Burgerschaft would remain undisturbed, as would the population, if they kept quiet. Otherwise, 10,000 Prussian troops would occupy the city. Friedrich Krüger, the Hanseatic plenipotentiary at the Bundestag of the German Confederation at Frankfurt had been in Hamburg since 22 June. Carl Merck (Hamburg's foreign minister), to whom Wolffson and Halben had already reported Richthofen's visit, sent him to Richthofen to obtain certainty about the Prussian threats.

At the 26 June meeting of the Hamburg Senate, Merck said that to avoid occupation of Hamburg, dissolution of the government or further coercion, it was now necessary to give way. All of northern Germany had joined Prussia, and one could not be sure what energetic steps Prussia could take. Krüger, still their Bundestag envoy, was not without influence on the decisions during the critical hours, and then had to return to Frankfurt to make a joint statement of the three cities. His attitude had been cautious since 16 June. A milder answer to Prussia than originally proposed on 22 June was then sent, giving way to Prussia on the main demands.

Finally from 1868 to 1871 Richthofen was the Minister (envoy) of the North German Federation at Stockholm, Sweden.
