= Mathilde Jacob =

German translator (1873–1943)

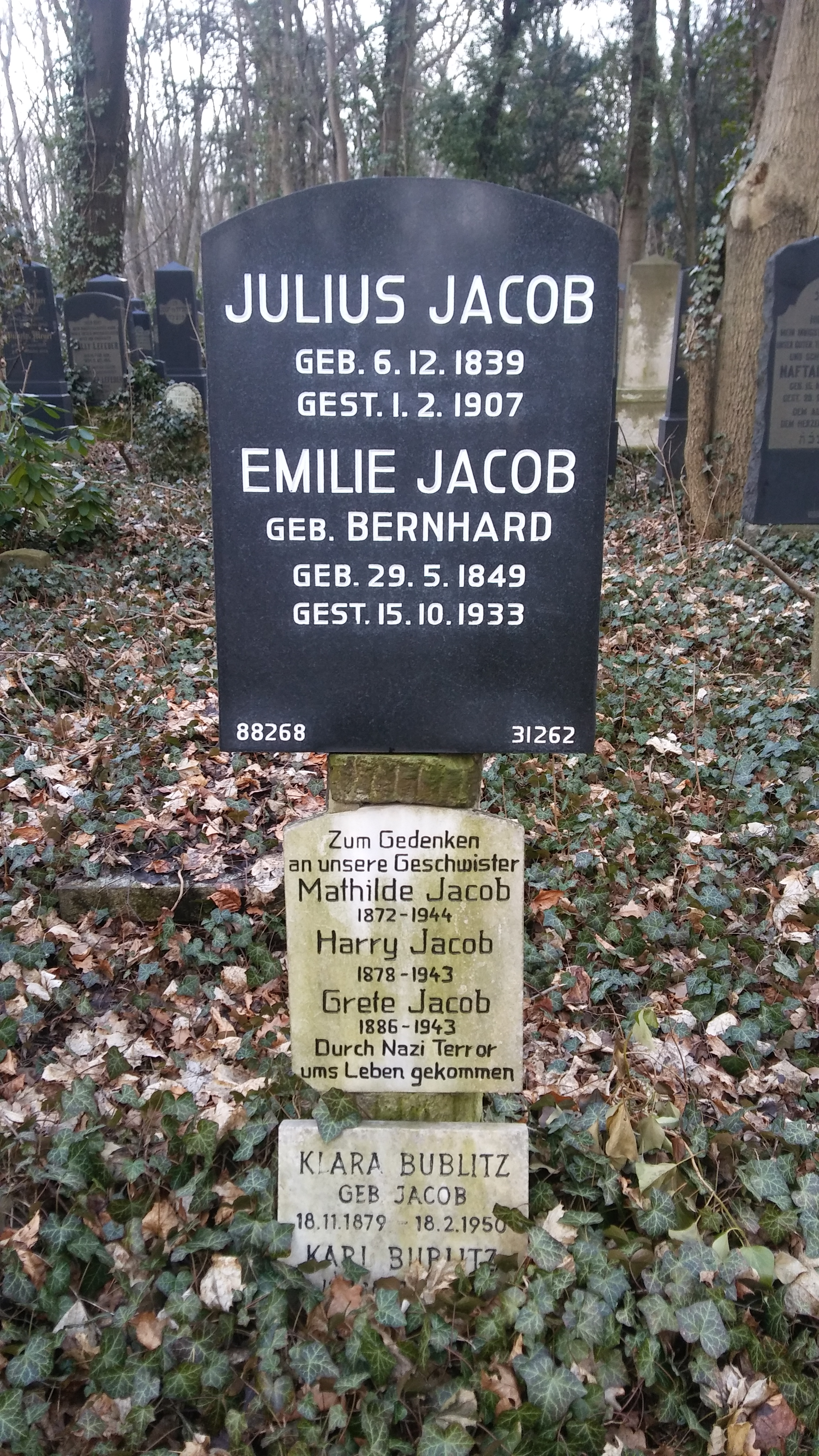
- Plaque for Mathilde Jacob in Jewish Cemetery Berlin-Weißensee
- Born: March 8, 1873; Berlin
- Died: April 14, 1943 (aged 70); Theresienstadt concentration camp
- Occupations: Typist, translator

Mathilde Jacob (8 March 1873 – 14 April 1943) was a German typist and translator who during the First World War became politically involved, working with the anti-war Spartacus League and as a founder member of the German Communist Party. She came to politics through her work for Rosa Luxemburg, whose friend and close confidant she became. Although Mathilde Jacob continued to be politically engaged in the 1920s, her greater contribution to history comes from her having smuggled Luxemburg's letters and documents out of Luxemburg's prison cell during her friend's various incarcerations during the 1914–1918 war. She then preserved much of Luxemburg's written legacy after the latter's murder.

By the time the Nazis took power early in 1933 Mathilde Jacob had for most purposes retired into obscurity, but her personal history of communist activism and her Jewishness nevertheless made her vulnerable. It is thought that she attempted to escape from Germany in 1936 but without success. In 1939 she did succeed in transferring some of the letters written to and by Rosa Luxemburg to the United States. She died in the Theresienstadt concentration camp, having been arrested and deported at the end of July 1942. Following Jacob's death, the authorities attending to her confiscated assets recorded a claim from her landlord that she was liable to pay for some repairs on her apartment, also noting that rent on the property had not been received for three months.

== Life ==
=== Provenance and early years ===
Mathilde Jacob was born in Berlin. She was the eldest child of Julius and Emilie Jacob who ran a small meat wholesale business. In 1907 she set herself up as a freelance typist and translator in the Berlin-Moabit quarter. In her little agency she at times employed an assistant, and at one stage she took on a trainee. Clients for whom she typed up manuscripts included the political radicals Julian Marchlewski, Franz Mehring and, from 1913, the influential philosopher Rosa Luxemburg. Jacob was deeply impressed by Luxemburg, and became supportive of the anti-militarist campaign in which Luxemburg was engaged. She is described in sources as having become Luxemburg's reliable confidant, and in practical terms was able to be particularly helpful during Luxemburg's various periods in prison, looking after her friend's apartment and attending to Mimi, the cat, who died while Luxemburg was away in prison. It is also clear that Luxemburg, who had not been convicted but for much or all of this time was simply being detained in "protective custody" was able to receive visitors and was not prevented from writing copiously while she was in prison. Jacob was able to smuggle several important manuscripts out of the jail, including the "Spartacus letters" ("news sheets") and the "Junius Pamphlet", Luxemburg's important critique of the crisis unfolding in the Social Democratic Party, in the wake of the party leadership's decision to agree what amounted to a parliamentary truce, notably on matters involving funding for the war, for its duration. However, although the Junius pamphlet subsequently became something of an iconic document, at the time it proved impossible to find a publisher for it till after Luxemburg's (temporary) release from prison in 1916. From 1917 Mathilde Jacobs also worked intensively with Luxemburg's political associate Leo Jogiches: their collaboration lasted well into the revolutionary period that Germany experienced directly after the war. Jacobs was certainly present at the three day party congress that started on 30 December 1918 which marked the foundation of the Communist Party of Germany. It is likely that she participated actively in it.

=== Revolution and leadership killings ===
During the weeks following the creation of the Communist Party, Berlin saw a new wave of revolutionary violence, which the communist leaders, Rosa Luxemburg and Karl Liebknecht, declined to disown. With the savage aftermath the Russian Revolution still fresh in the minds of all concerned, the new German government ordered the immediate destruction of the left-wing uprising: the implementation of this instruction involved the killings by a Freikorps cavalry unit, on 15 January 1919, of both Luxemburg and Liebknecht. Luxemburg's body was thrown into a canal. Not quite five months later, early in June 1919, a body believed to be Rosa Luxemburg's was recovered. Mathilde Jacob and Luxemburg's friend, Wanda Marcusson, were summoned to corroborate its identification, which they did, largely on the basis of the dress and blue medallion accompanying the badly decomposed corpse. (The identification of the corpse remains contentious.) In the immediate aftermath of the killings, Mathilde Jacob, who seemed to be under less immediate threat than some of the more fiery comrades, assumed responsibility for the finances of the new party. However, she herself was arrested and detained between June and September 1919.

=== More party splits ===
Following Mathilde Jacob's exclusion from the party, an unnamed official committed to paper some thoughts on the party's ambitions to publish the hitherto unpublished writings of Rosa Luxemburg: "...Rosa Luxemburg's literary legacy is in the hands of a spinster who no longer belongs to the party because of a breach of party discipline. It is questionable whether she will hand the material over to us".

Mathilde Jacob reacted in an angry letter published in "Freiheit"

"Many proletarians will probably have asked themselves, who might "that spinster" be, in whom Rosa Luxemburg placed her whole trust, even appointing her as guardian of her political inheritance? It goes against the grain for me to speak about myself. It is utterly self evident that I have done what was right and will continue to do it. I marched as a simple soldier in the Spartacus League, but I never lost my appetite for the struggle, never abandoned the work, unlike some of the "attack heroes" now occupying seats on the party executive. I worked for long years even before the war with Karl Liebknecht, Rosa Luxemburg, Franz Mehring and many others. During the hardest years in the war I worked voluntarily as secretary for Leo Jogiches. The Spartacus League, at that time, had no money, and all of us, who worked and struggled in it, sacrificed every drop of energy and every last penny to it. The task was far heavier than today. We didn't step out from some fortress! We were placed in penitentiaries and prisons. It was so difficult to get contributions for those "Spartacus Letters"! Who - apart from Rosa Luxemburg - wrote for the "Spartacus letters"? All that material went through my hands, and aside from a small number of minimal contributions, the only person providing material apart from Rosa Luxemburg was Paul Levi, whom now you call "opportunist". Today masses of people have discovered their "revolutionary hearts" and speak of me as "that spinster". But how come she is "that spinster" and no longer "comrade"? Probably because I take responsibility for Paul Levi's newspaper "Unser Weg". And yes, I am completely open in my support for Levi."

"Viele Proletarier werden wohl verwundert gefragt haben, wer wohl das "Fräulein" sein mag, die Rosa Luxemburgs Vertrauen in so hohem Maße besaß, daß sie sogar zur Hüterin ihrer politischen Hinterlassenschaft bestellt wurde. Es widerstrebt mir, von mir selbst zu sprechen. Ist es doch so selbstverständlich, daß man seine Schuldigkeit tat und sie weiter tut. Ich marschierte als einfacher Soldat im Spartakusbund, aber ich habe nie den Kampfesmut verloren, ich habe nie die Arbeit im Stich gelassen, wie so manche der Offensivhelden, die heute in der Zentrale der V. K. P. D. sitzen. Ich arbeitete vor dem Kriege lange Jahre hindurch mit Karl Liebknecht, Rosa Luxemburg, Franz Mehring und vielen anderen. Ich leistete in der schwierigsten Zeit während des Krieges Leo Jogiches freiwillige Sekretärdienste. Denn der Spartakusbund hatte keine Mittel, und wir alle, die wir in ihm kämpften und arbeiteten, opferten unseren letzten Pfennig und unsere äußerste Kraft. Es war eine erheblich aufreibendere Arbeit als heute. Wir kamen nicht auf Festung! Wir wanderten in die Gefängnisse, in die Zuchthäuser. Wie schwierig war es, die Beiträge für die Spartakusbriefe zu bekommen! Wer schrieb außer Rosa Luxemburg für die Spartakusbriefe? Alle Mitteilungen hierfür gingen durch meine Hände, und neben ganz winzigen Beiträgen von anderer Seite schrieb außer Rosa Luxemburg nur – der "Opportunist" Paul Levi ... Heute haben ungeheuer viele ihr revolutionäres Herz entdeckt und sprechen von mir als "Fräulein". Aber weshalb ist sie für diese Fräulein und nicht mehr Genossin? Wahrscheinlich, weil ich für die Zeitschrift Paul Levis "Unser Weg" verantwortlich zeichne. Ja, ich bekenne mich ganz offen zur Richtung Levi ."

Mathilde Jacob in "Freiheit", September 1921

Jacob was badly affected by Luxemburg's killing, which was followed, in March 1919, by the assassination of Leo Jogiches. After her release from detention in September 1919 she moved to Stuttgart and joined up with Clara Zetkin, with whom she worked on the editorial content of the magazine "Kommunistin" ("[female] Communist"). She also worked closely with Paul Levi who took over the party leadership in March 1919, and whose political outlook she shared. However, the party split in 1921 after Levy spoke out against the violent tactics employed in the March insurrection in central Germany. It turned out that his view of the matter was not widely shared among leading party comrades, and it was Levi who left the Communist Party of Germany, founding the Communist Working Group (KAG). Jacob went with him. During 1921/1922 she edited the KAG newspaper, "Unser Weg" ("Our way"). Later she also contributed to "Sozialistische Politik und Wirtschaft" (SPW / "Sozialistische Politik und Wirtschaft"), a periodical produced by Levi himself. In 1922 she was among those, with Levy, who briefly rejoined the Independent Social Democratic Party (" Unabhängige Sozialdemokratische Partei Deutschlands" / USPD) from which the Communist Party had drawn many of its founding members three years earlier. By September 1922 the USPD and the SPD were collaborating well in the Reichstag and the decision was taken to merge them, thus reversing a split that had taken place in 1917. As a result of all this, Mathilde Jacob now found herself a member of the Social Democratic Party ("Sozialdemokratische Partei Deutschlands" / SPD). In 1922 she reopened her little typing and translation agency in Berlin.

She continued to support Paul Levi with the production of various political publications, such as the newspaper "Unser Weg" ("Our way"). After Levi died, in 1930, she withdrew from political activities, although after 1933 she did maintain contacts with opposition circles. Through the 1920s she was, for the most part, content to remain in the background. An exception arose in the summer of 1921. The seventh party conference, held at Jena in August 1921, turned its attention to a project to publish the writings of Rosa Luxemburg, a much revered figure within the party whose status, following her killing, remained undiminished. A party official subsequently committed certain practical concerns to paper, however, suggesting that the project would most likely come to nothing because Luxemburg's papers were in the hands of "a spinster, who following a breach of party discipline, no longer belongs to the party". The official was casting doubt on whether Rosa Luxemburg's papers would be handed over to the party. Jacob's reaction, which came in the form of a letter published in the USPD newspaper, "Freiheit", was both revealing and withering.

=== Final years ===
The Nazis took power at the start of 1933. Mathilde Jacob was subjected to the same repression and restrictions as everyone else identified as Jewish. She survived on a small pension and with small writing assignments. She was taken away on 27 July 1942 and deported to the Theresienstadt concentration camp. For many years it was known that she died there, but it is only recently, following the discovery and review in Israel of some records recovered from Theresienstadt, that her precise death date, 14 April 1943, was identified.
