= Rosa Luxemburg =

Polish-German Marxist revolutionary (1871–1919)

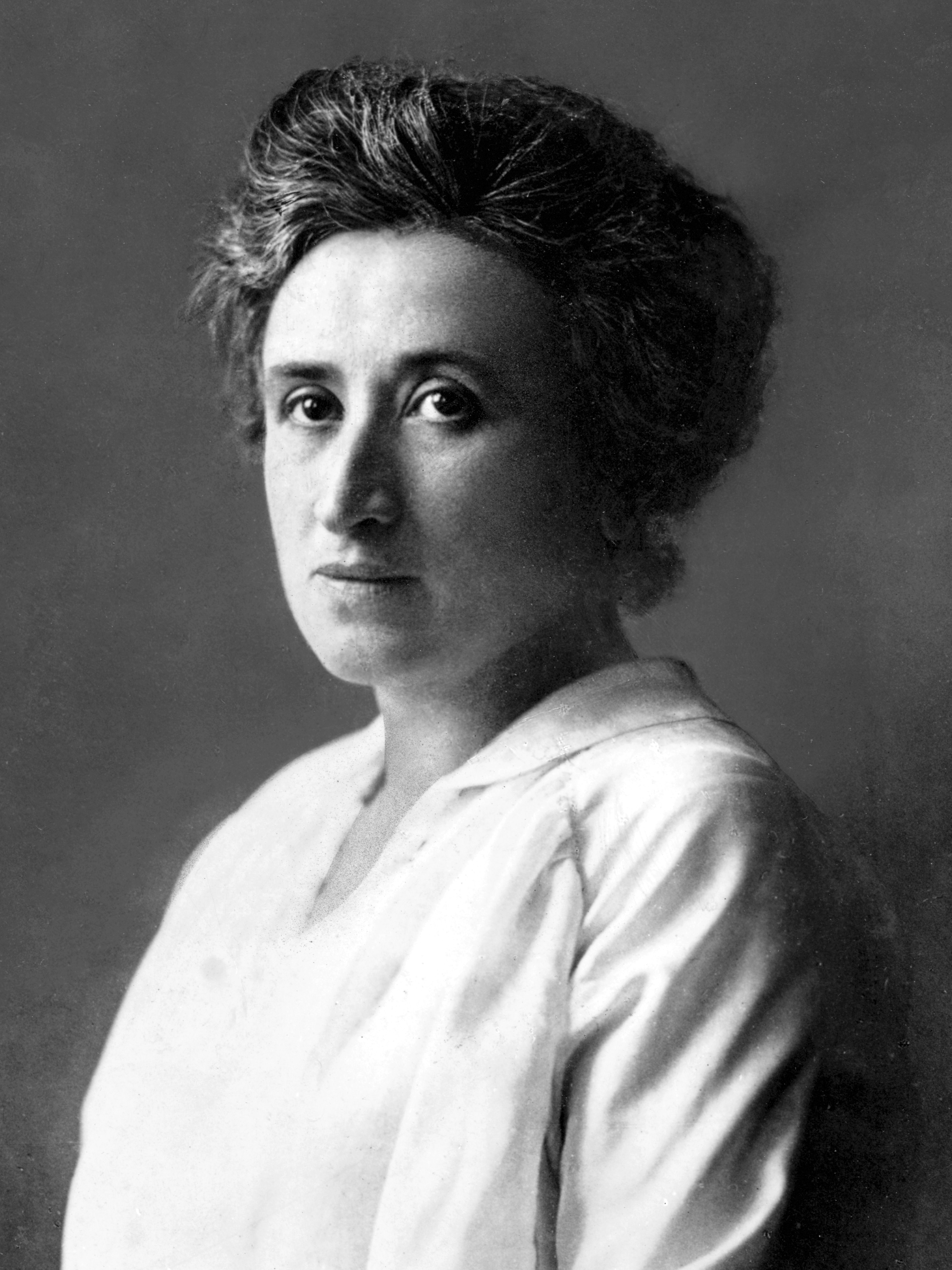
- Luxemburg, c. 1911
- Born: Rozalia Luksenburg; 5 March 1871; Zamość, Congress Poland, Russian Empire
- Died: 15 January 1919 (aged 47); Berlin, Germany
- Cause of death: Assassination by gunshot
- Education: University of Zurich (doctorate; 1897)
- Notable work: Social Reform or Revolution? (1899); The Mass Strike, the Political Party and the Trade Unions (1906); The Accumulation of Capital (1913); Junius Pamphlet (1915); The Russian Revolution (1922)
- Political party: Proletariat (1886–1889); Social Democracy of the Kingdom of Poland and Lithuania (1893–1918); Social Democratic Party of Germany (1898–1917); Independent Social Democratic Party of Germany (1917–1918); Communist Party of Germany (1918–1919)
- Other political affiliations: Spartacus League (1914–1918)
- Movement: Marxism; Social democracy
- Partner: Leo Jogiches (1890–1907)
- Central institution membership: 1919: Full member, KPD Zentrale

Rosa Luxemburg (/ˈlʌksəmbɜːrɡ/ LUK-səm-burg; Polish: Róża Luksemburg [ˈruʐa ˈluksɛmburk]; German: [ˈʁoːza ˈlʊksm̩bʊʁk]; 5 March 1871 – 15 January 1919) was a Polish and naturalised-German Marxist theorist and revolutionary. She was a leading theorist of the Social Democratic Party of Germany (SPD) and later co-founded the anti-war Spartacus League, which evolved into the Communist Party of Germany (KPD). An influential member of the international socialist movement, she is remembered for her writings on imperialism and revolution, and as a champion of socialist democracy.

Born and raised in Russian-ruled Poland to a secular Jewish family, Luxemburg became active in revolutionary politics in her youth. She co-founded the Social Democracy of the Kingdom of Poland and Lithuania (SDKPiL), a party that rejected Polish nationalism in favour of an international class struggle. After moving to Germany in 1898, she became the foremost voice of the SPD's revolutionary wing. In her 1900 pamphlet Social Reform or Revolution?, she defended the necessity of revolution against the reformist theories of Eduard Bernstein, arguing that the struggle for reforms was a means to an end, not an end in itself. Inspired by the 1905 Russian Revolution, she developed a theory of the mass strike as the proletariat's most important revolutionary tool, emphasizing the spontaneous creativity of the working class.

As World War I approached, Luxemburg's anti-militarist and anti-imperialist convictions brought her into increasing conflict with the SPD leadership. In her major work, The Accumulation of Capital (1913), she argued that capitalism's need to expand into non-capitalist regions to survive was the driving force behind imperialism. She fiercely condemned the party's support for the war and was imprisoned for most of the conflict. From prison, she wrote the influential Junius Pamphlet, which declared the war a betrayal of the working class and popularized the phrase "socialism or barbarism" to describe the choice facing humanity. While she celebrated the Russian Revolution of 1917, in a posthumously published manuscript she offered a sharp critique of the Bolsheviks' authoritarian policies, defending democratic freedoms and the need for a revolution rooted in mass participation. Her writings on the Russian Revolution were later viewed by some as a prescient critique of Stalinism.

Released from prison during the German Revolution of 1918–1919, Luxemburg co-founded the KPD and became a central figure in the January 1919 Spartacist uprising in Berlin. After the uprising was crushed by the Freikorps, a government-sponsored paramilitary group, Luxemburg and her comrade Karl Liebknecht were captured and killed. Following her death, Luxemburg became a heroine and martyr for Marxists. Her legacy has been a subject of intense debate, with her emphasis on spontaneity and democracy celebrated by many on the left—particularly by the New Left and those in the libertarian socialist tradition—but sharply criticized by the Stalinist tradition, which denounced "Luxemburgism" as a heresy.

== Early life (1871–1889) ==
Rozalia Luksenburg (she later adopted the spelling "Luxemburg") was born on 5 March 1871 in Zamość, a town in the Russian-controlled Congress Poland. She was the fifth and youngest child of a moderately well-off, assimilated, secular Jewish family. Her father, Elias (or Eduard) Luxemburg, was a timber merchant with a German education who was sympathetic to the Polish national movement. Her mother, Lina Löwenstein, was descended from a long line of rabbis. The family was committed to the values of the Haskalah, the Jewish enlightenment movement, and embraced progressive European culture. They spoke Polish and German at home, and Rosa, like her four siblings, received a secular education.

Luxemburg had a complex relationship with her Jewish identity; while proud of her heritage, she rejected any specific Jewish political cause, insisting that the suffering of Jews was no worse than the often murderous oppression of other peoples by European imperialism. She stated later in life: "I have no special corner of my heart for the [Jewish] ghetto. I feel at home in the entire world wherever there are clouds and birds and human tears." As such, the Jewish socialist Bund held no attraction for her, and her concerns consistently transcended nationality.

In 1873, the family moved to Warsaw to seek better business opportunities, a better education for their children, and to escape the ever-present anti-Jewish sentiment and Orthodox-Hasidic dominance in Zamość. At age five, Luxemburg developed a hip disease, possibly a congenital hip dislocation. It was misdiagnosed as tuberculosis and resulted in a year-long confinement in a cast, during which she taught herself to read and write. The illness left her with a permanent limp, a condition that deeply affected her and which she later blamed her parents for not detecting earlier.

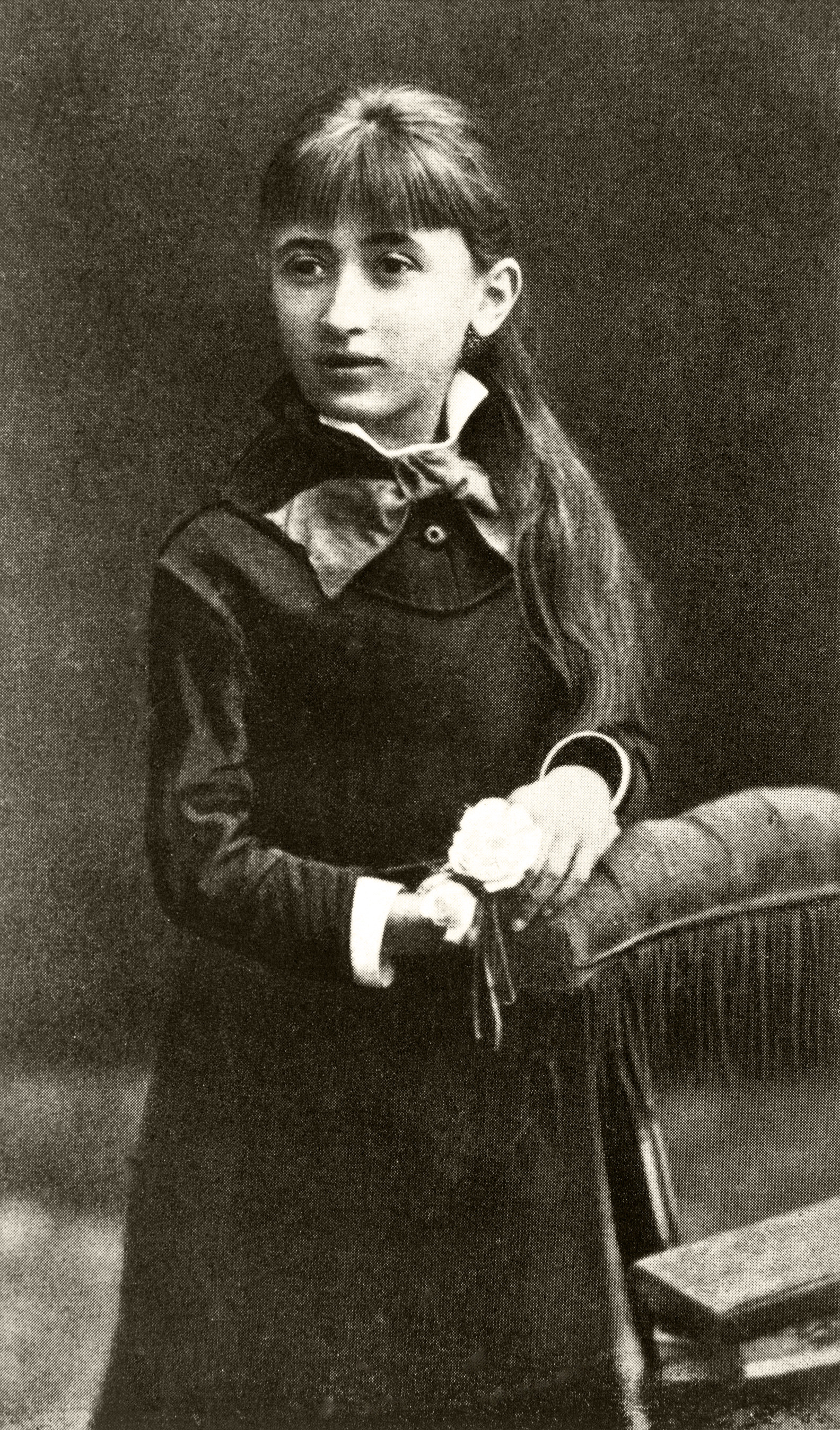
Luxemburg at about age 12, c. 1883

In 1880, she enrolled at the Second Girls' High School in Warsaw. Admission for Jewish students was subject to a quota, a humiliation which intensified her sense of being an outsider. The school was an instrument of Russification, forbidding the use of Polish. The 1881 Warsaw pogrom, which her family experienced, left her with a permanent fear of mob violence. In response to this frightening reality, she found refuge in the poetry of the Polish Romantic Adam Mickiewicz, whose appeal to rebellion and dreams of universal freedom became a source of inspiration. During this time, while still in her teens, Luxemburg became involved in clandestine student circles associated with the revolutionary Proletariat party. This was the first Polish socialist party, founded in 1882 by Ludwik Waryński. The party was internationalist in outlook, prioritising the economic struggle of the working class and opposing "romantic" ideas such as national liberation, which it believed would deflect or compromise class consciousness. By her final year, Luxemburg was known to the authorities as a politically active and rebellious student, and she was denied the gold medal for academic achievement which her scholastic merits had earned.

After graduating in 1887, she continued her revolutionary activities. She was part of a cell of the "Second Proletariat", one of the successor groups to the original party which had been broken up by arrests in the mid-1880s. By 1889, threatened with arrest, she was smuggled out of Poland with the help of her mentor, Marcin Kasprzak. According to one account, she was hidden under straw in a peasant's cart and taken across the border by a Catholic priest who had been told she was a Jewish girl fleeing to be baptized.

== Zurich and early political career (1889–1898) ==
Luxemburg arrived in Zurich in early 1889. At the time, Switzerland was the most important centre of Russian and Polish revolutionary Marxism in exile. In 1890, she enrolled at the University of Zurich, where women were admitted on an equal footing with men. She initially studied natural sciences and mathematics, but in 1892 she switched to the faculty of law, where she studied public law and political economy under Professor Julius Wolf. Wolf later acknowledged that "she came to me from Poland already as a thorough Marxist".

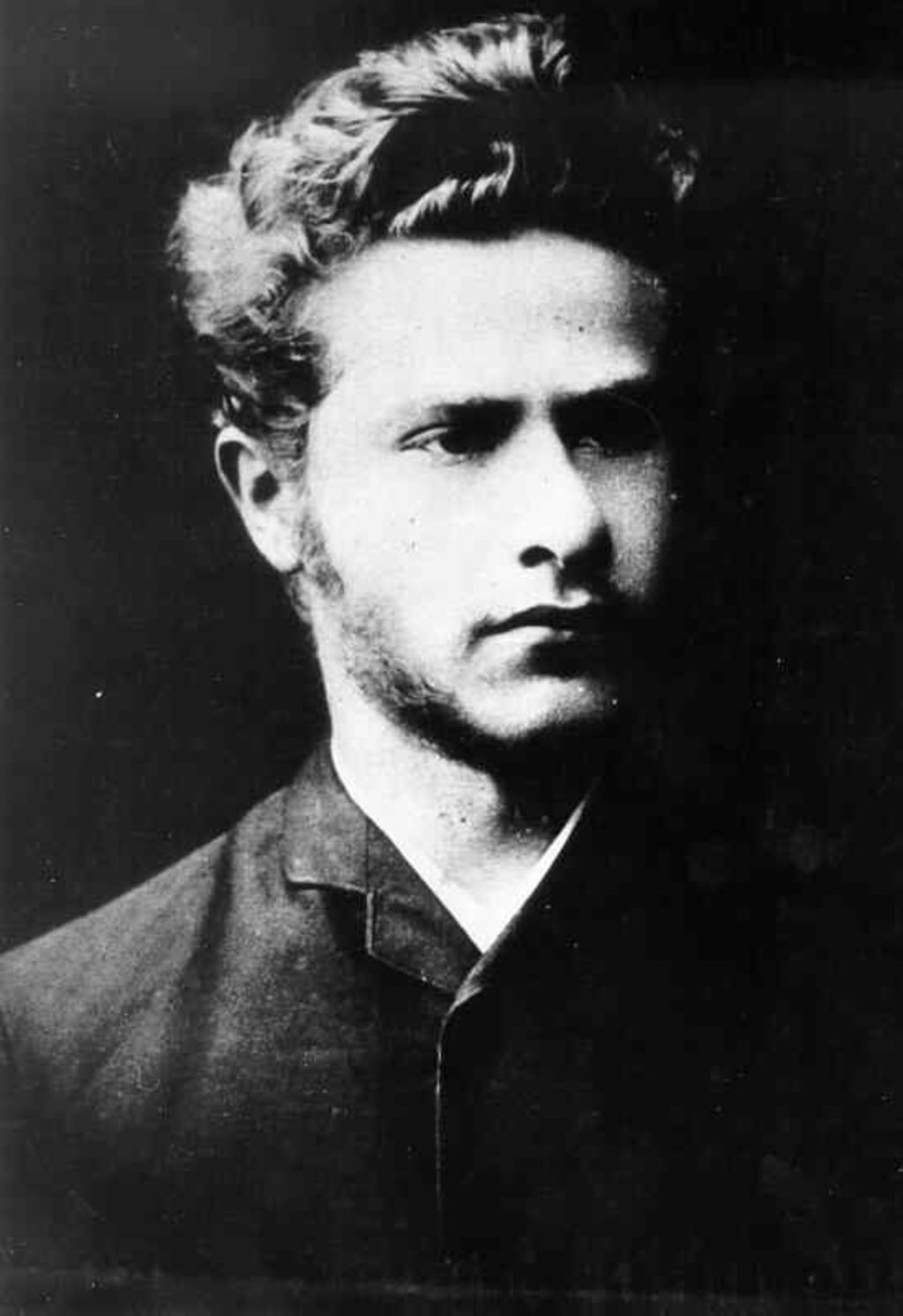
Leo Jogiches c. 1890

In early autumn 1890, she met Leo Jogiches, a famous revolutionary from Vilna who had also recently escaped from the Russian Empire. They fell in love and by the summer of 1891 had become lovers, beginning a tumultuous fifteen-year relationship that she considered a marriage, referring to him in her letters as her husband. Jogiches became the most dominant figure in her personal and political life. Their relationship was a complex fusion of personal intimacy and political collaboration, marked by both deep affection and intense intellectual conflict. Jogiches provided the financial support for their activities, while Luxemburg became the partnership's public voice and theorist. He insisted on absolute secrecy about their relationship, which Luxemburg alternately rebelled against and accepted.

Soon after their arrival, Jogiches and Luxemburg came into conflict with the established leadership of Russian Marxism, centred around Georgi Plekhanov in Geneva. Jogiches proposed a publishing partnership with Plekhanov on equal terms and was promptly rejected. The ensuing quarrel isolated them from the main Russian socialist movement and pushed their activities increasingly towards Polish affairs. They began to gather a small group of Polish students and exiles around them, including Julian Marchlewski and Adolf Warszawski. In 1893, this group founded a new party, the Social Democracy of the Kingdom of Poland (SDKP), in opposition to the recently unified Polish Socialist Party (PPS). The SDKP's programme, largely formulated by Luxemburg, rejected the PPS's central demand for Polish independence. Instead, it argued for close collaboration with Russian socialists to achieve a revolution in the Russian Empire, within which Poland would have territorial autonomy.

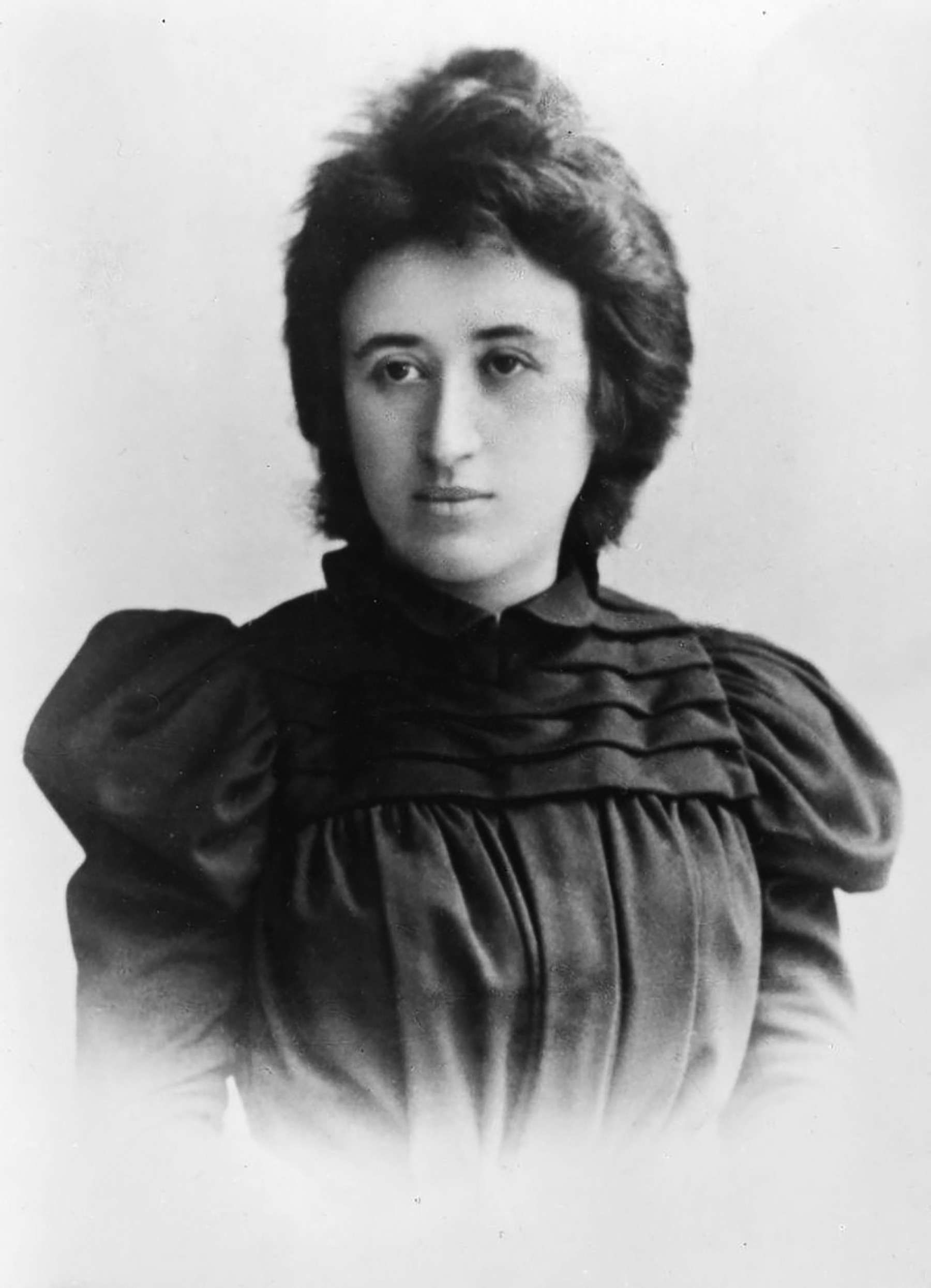
Luxemburg, c. 1893

At the Second International's third congress in Zurich in 1893, Luxemburg, as a delegate for the SDKP's newspaper Sprawa Robotnicza (The Workers' Cause), had her mandate challenged by the PPS delegation. Small and frail, she climbed onto a chair to make herself heard and, with "magnetism in her eyes and in such fiery words", defended her cause. Although the congress ultimately voted to reject her mandate, she achieved a moral victory by framing the dispute as one of principle rather than personal rivalry. This conflict over the "national question" became the central and most enduring division in Polish socialism. The polemics between the two parties forced both to sharpen their positions: the PPS became more openly nationalist, while the SDKP's opposition to Polish independence became a core doctrine. At the next congress in London in 1896, the International passed a compromise resolution supporting the right of all nations to self-determination but without specific mention of Poland.

In 1897, Luxemburg successfully defended her doctoral dissertation in economics, Die industrielle Entwicklung Polens (The Industrial Development of Poland), which argued that its industrial growth was inextricably linked to the Russian market, a connection driven by the Russian government's own policies. For Luxemburg, this "objective economic trend" meant that Polish independence was an economic and political negation of progress, a self-defeating strategy for the Polish working class that would slow its development. She was one of the first women in the world, and the first Polish woman, to be awarded a doctorate in political economy. To obtain German citizenship and the ability to work within the Social Democratic Party of Germany (SPD), she entered into a marriage of convenience with Gustav Lübeck, son of her Zurich friend Olympia Lübeck, in April 1898. On 12 May 1898, she moved to Berlin.

== Activism in the SPD (1898–1905) ==
Luxemburg arrived in Germany at a pivotal moment for the SPD. After years of operating under the Anti-Socialist Laws, the party had grown into a massive but politically isolated organisation. Its official doctrine, codified in the 1891 Erfurt Program, combined a Marxist prediction of capitalism's inevitable collapse with a practical focus on immediate, minimal reforms. This inherent contradiction was brought to the fore by the revisionist controversy, which began in earnest in 1898. Eduard Bernstein, a respected party veteran living in London, published a series of articles arguing that many of Marx's predictions were outdated. He proposed that the party should abandon its revolutionary goals and "dare to appear as what it actually was: a democratic Socialist party of reform".

Luxemburg immediately plunged into the debate, seeing it as a crucial opportunity to establish her career and defend what she saw as the core of Marxism. As a Polish-Jewish woman, she faced considerable resentment from many party leaders. She became a leading voice of the party's revolutionary left, along with Alexander Parvus. Her most significant contribution was the pamphlet Social Reform or Revolution?, first published as a series of articles in the Leipziger Volkszeitung in late 1898 and early 1899.

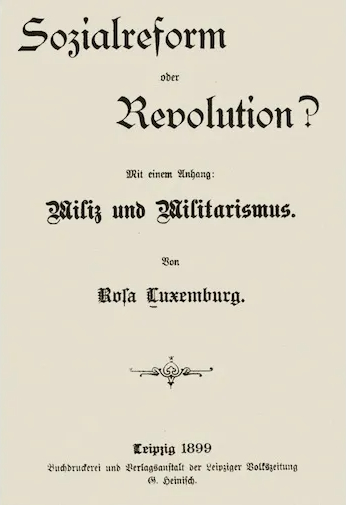
Title page of Social Reform or Revolution? (1899)

In it, she argued that Bernstein's reformist path would "paralyze completely the proletarian class struggle ", resulting not in socialism but only the reform of capitalism. The daily struggle for reforms, she contended, was the only way for the proletariat to develop the class consciousness necessary for the revolutionary seizure of power, a process it would learn not through its successes but through its failures. As she explained, "Between social reforms and revolution there exists for the Social Democracy an indissoluble tie. The struggle for reforms is its means; the social revolution, its aim." To abandon the final goal of revolution would be to sever practice from theory, transforming the socialist movement into a mere reformist, petit-bourgeois party. She dismantled Bernstein's economic arguments, reasserting the Marxist theses of capitalist crisis and collapse.

The pamphlet established her reputation as a major theorist and the "hammer of revisionism". In this early period, however, her method for connecting the party's minimum and maximum goals remained somewhat abstract; having established that the struggle for reforms could not by itself lead to socialism, she insisted that it must nonetheless express the socialist goal through a subjective act of will, without yet outlining a concrete strategy for doing so.

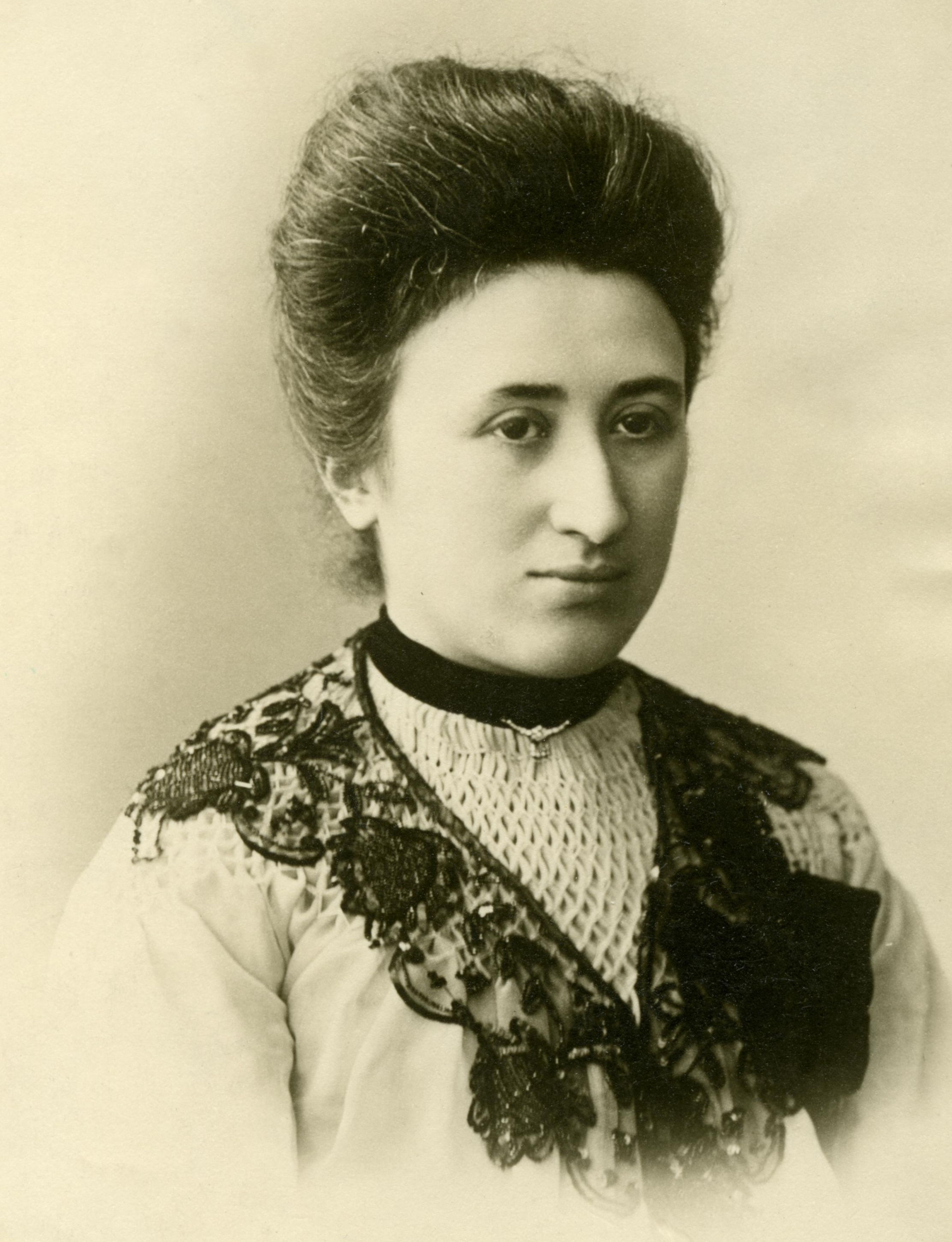
Luxemburg c. 1900

At the party congresses of 1898, 1899, and 1901, Luxemburg was a prominent speaker, crossing swords not only with revisionists but also with the party leadership, which she often saw as too accommodating. She defended socialists' involvement in the Dreyfus affair in France, but sharply condemned the "rotten compromise" of French socialist Alexandre Millerand entering a bourgeois government. She formed a close intellectual and personal alliance with Karl Kautsky, the party's leading theorist, and his wife Luise. Together with Kautsky, she led the "orthodox" Marxist camp against Bernstein, though her approach was always more radical and action-oriented than Kautsky's more academic defence of principles. By 1903, the revisionist challenge had been officially defeated within the party, and the orthodox line was resoundingly confirmed at the 1904 Amsterdam Congress of the Second International.

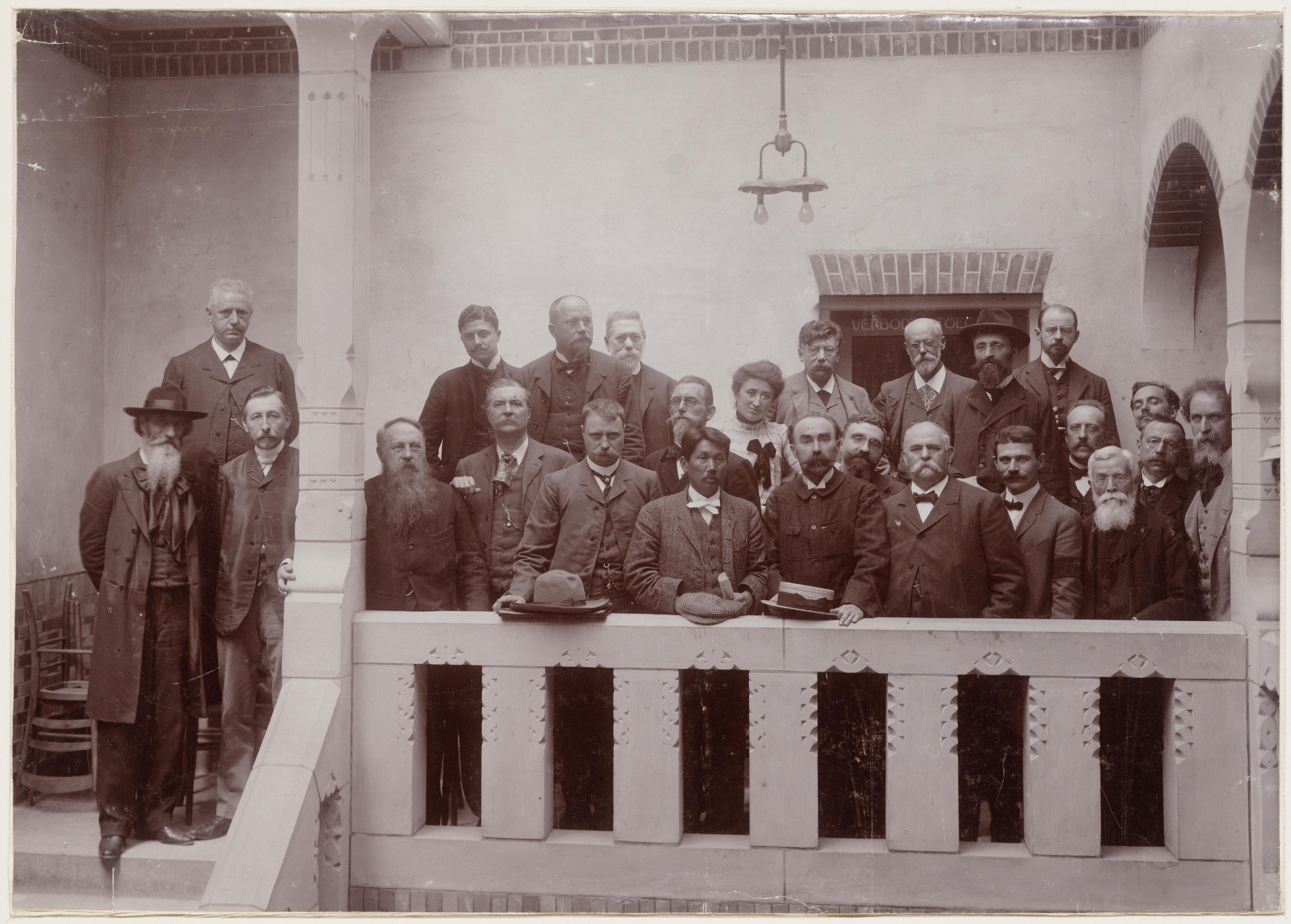
Luxemburg (near centre, wearing bow) at the 1904 Amsterdam Congress of the Second International

Following her victory at the Amsterdam Congress, Luxemburg was imprisoned. In July 1904, she was sentenced to three months in prison for insulting Emperor Wilhelm II during a public speech. She began her sentence at the end of August in the Zwickau jail. After six weeks, on 15 October, she was released as part of a general amnesty for political prisoners granted on the coronation of the new monarch of Saxony, Friedrich August III. Luxemburg reluctantly accepted the release, stating she would have preferred to refuse such "royal grace".

Throughout this period, Luxemburg led a dual political life, maintaining her central role in the SDKP while becoming a major figure in the SPD. She deliberately kept her German and Polish activities separate, a division facilitated by Jogiches's insistence on conspiratorial methods. From her base in Berlin, she directed much of the SDKP's strategy, particularly its unrelenting campaign against the PPS in Germany and in the International. In 1899, the SDKP merged with a group of Lithuanian social democrats led by Felix Dzerzhinsky, becoming the Social Democracy of the Kingdom of Poland and Lithuania (SDKPiL). Her influence and the support of the SPD leadership were instrumental in establishing the SDKPiL as a recognised, albeit small, force in international socialism. Luxemburg remained sentimental towards Polish culture, with Mickiewicz as her favourite poet. In 1893, she wrote against the Russification of Poles by the Russian Empire, and in 1900 published a brochure against the Germanisation of Poles in Poznań.

== 1905 Revolution and aftermath (1905–1912) ==
=== Role in the 1905 Revolution ===
The 1905 Russian Revolution erupted dramatically in January and had a profound impact on Luxemburg's thought and activity. The wave of mass strikes, peasant uprisings, and military mutinies that swept across the Russian Empire, including Poland, seemed to confirm her revolutionary predictions. She immediately began to analyse the events for the German and Polish socialist press. In her articles, she celebrated the mass strike as the central weapon of the revolution, a form of action that fused the economic and political struggles and spontaneously raised the class consciousness of the proletariat. She now saw the "backward" Russian working class, with its spontaneous revolutionary action, as the vanguard of the international workers' movement.

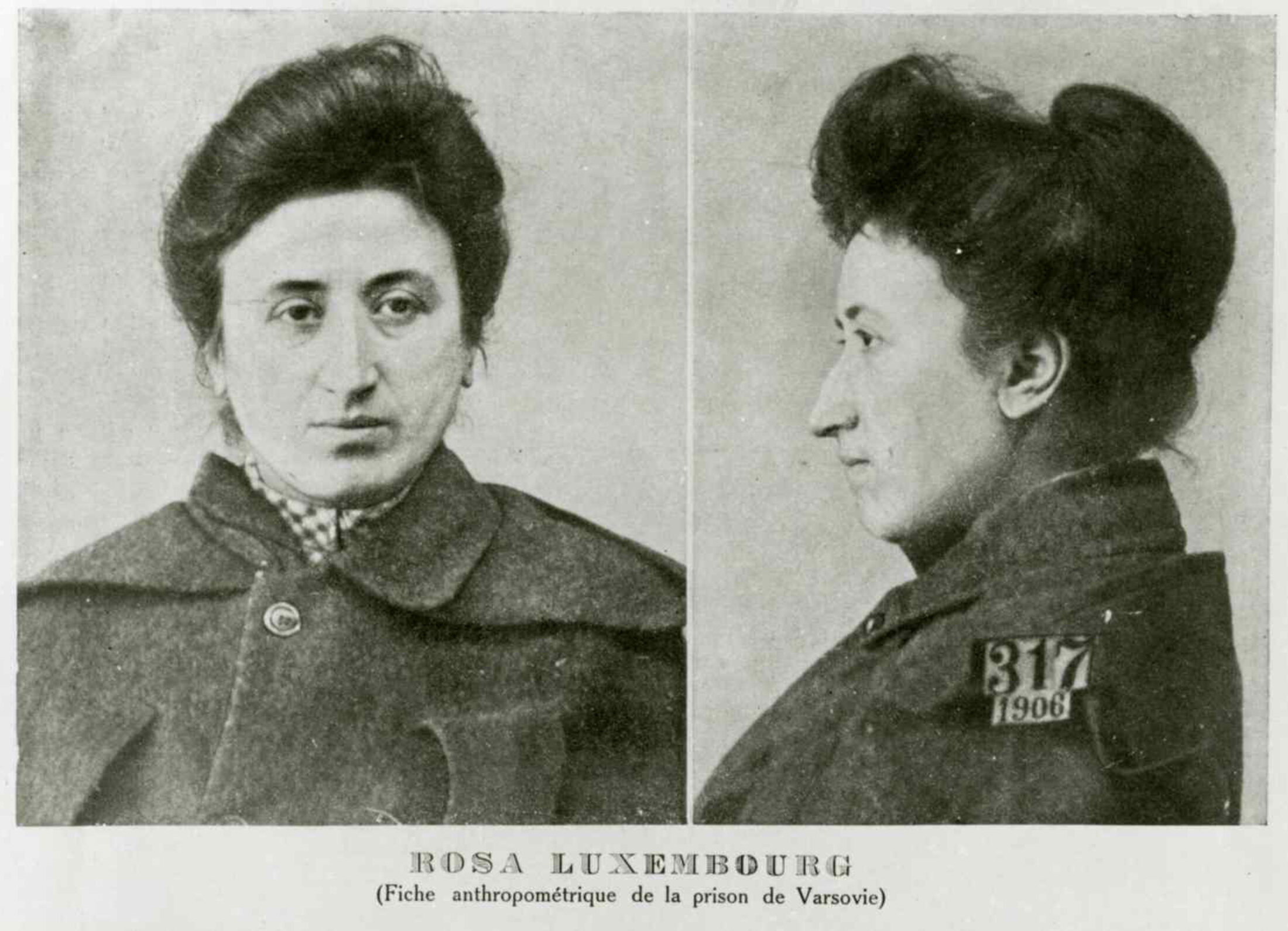
Mugshot taken after Luxemburg's arrest in Warsaw, 1906

As the revolution in Poland intensified, her position in Berlin became increasingly untenable. Feeling isolated from the "real revolution", she decided to go to Warsaw. Her relationship with Jogiches had entered a period of crisis, triggered in part by a brief affair she had with another revolutionary, which she confessed to Jogiches in August 1905. Despite warnings from her German and Polish colleagues about the dangers, she left Berlin on 28 December 1905, travelling on false papers under the name Anna Matschke. In Warsaw, she joined Jogiches and other SDKPiL leaders, plunging into the heart of the revolutionary turmoil. She wrote prolifically for the party's newspapers, helped to formulate its programme, and participated in clandestine meetings. However, her stay was short-lived. On 4 March 1906, she and Jogiches were arrested in a police raid.

Luxemburg was imprisoned for four months, first in the Town Hall jail, then in the Pawiak prison, and finally in the notorious Pavilion X of the Warsaw Citadel. Her health deteriorated rapidly, but her spirits remained high. Through the combined efforts of her family and the German SPD, including a bail of 3,000 roubles paid by her brother Jozef, she was released on 28 July 1906. Forbidden to leave Warsaw, she spent the next month arranging her departure. She eventually left for Kuokkala, Finland, where she joined Vladimir Lenin and other Bolshevik leaders for several weeks of discussion about the lessons of the revolution. This experience was formative, showing her what was possible when a working class manifested its "sovereignty" and that democracy held a potential beyond the circumscribed rights of the bourgeois state, a potential that could only be realised by extending democracy from the political into the socioeconomic realm.

=== Mass strike doctrine and SPD Party School ===
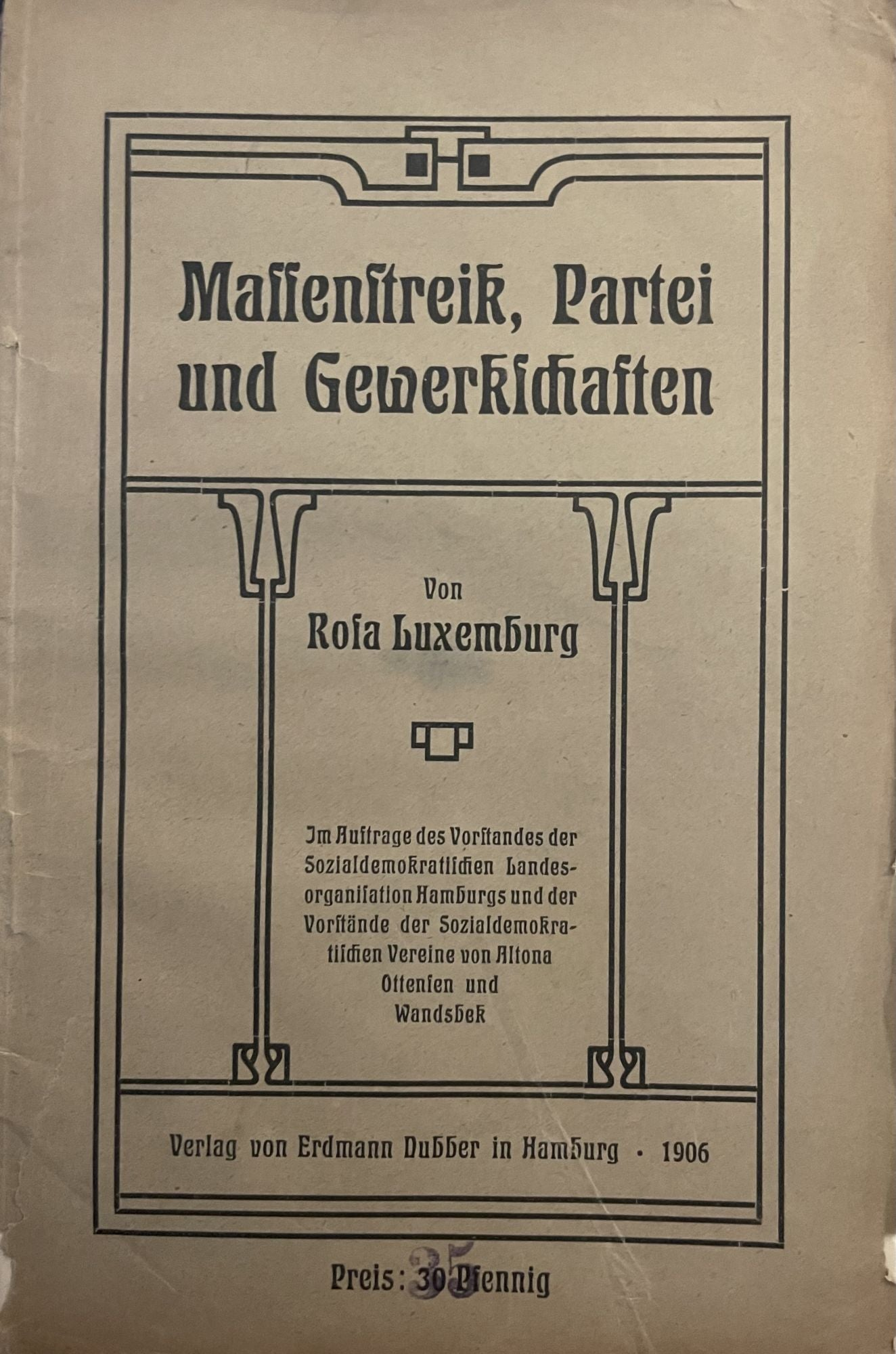
Cover of The Mass Strike, the Political Party and the Trade Unions (1906)

The experience of the 1905 revolution became the foundation for Luxemburg's most influential work on revolutionary strategy, the pamphlet The Mass Strike, the Political Party and the Trade Unions, written in Finland and published in Germany in 1906. In it, she generalized from the Russian experience, arguing that the mass strike was not a single, isolated act but a continuous process, a period of heightened class struggle in which the economic and political spheres were inseparable. It was, she argued, a spontaneous expression of the revolutionary energy of the masses, which the party could not artificially "make" but must lead and give political direction. For Luxemburg, the mass strike became the concrete strategic answer to the problem of bridging the gap between the party's minimum programme of immediate reforms and its maximum programme of social revolution. Her theory contained what her biographer Norman Geras called "an embryonic concept of dual power", seeing in the direct action of the masses the germ of a new form of proletarian democracy that could overthrow the bourgeois state.

The pamphlet was a direct challenge to the German trade union leadership, which saw the mass strike as a threat to their organizations and a recipe for "revolutionary romanticism". From the "whirlwind and the storm" of a mass strike, she wrote, could arise "fresh, young, powerful, buoyant trade unions". At the 1906 SPD congress in Mannheim, a major confrontation occurred between the party's revolutionary wing, represented by Luxemburg, and the trade union leaders led by Carl Legien. Luxemburg passionately defended the lessons of the Russian revolution, but the congress ultimately passed a resolution that effectively gave the trade unions a veto over any future mass strike action. A similar debate took place at the 1907 International Congress in Stuttgart, where an amendment drafted by Luxemburg, Lenin, and Julius Martov was attached to the main resolution on war and militarism. It committed the socialist parties not only to prevent war but also to use any war crisis to "hasten the abolition of capitalist class rule".

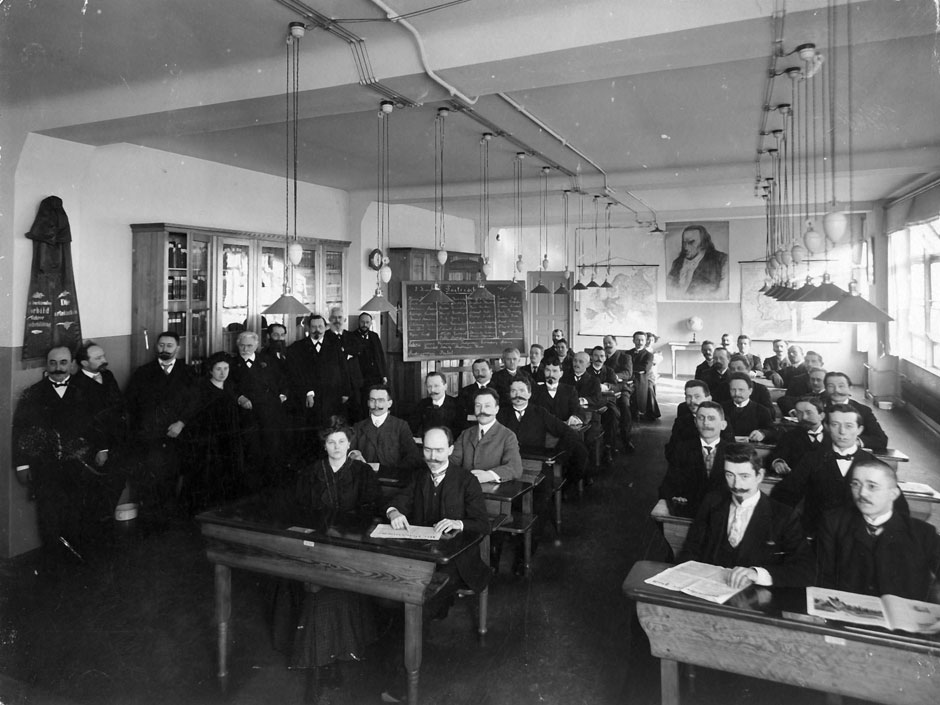
Luxemburg (fourth from left against bookcase) among attendees at the SPD party school in 1907

The years from 1907 to 1910 were a period of relative political quietism for Luxemburg in Germany. Following the SPD's electoral defeat in the 1907 "Hottentot elections", the party leadership became increasingly cautious and resistant to radical tactics. Disillusioned with the party's direction, Luxemburg withdrew from day-to-day agitation and focused on her theoretical work and teaching. In June and July 1907, she served a two-month prison sentence in Weimar for her speech at the SPD's 1905 Jena congress. In October 1907, she became a lecturer in political economy and economic history at the SPD's new Central Party School in Berlin, a post she held until 1914. The school was intended to train an elite of party and trade union functionaries. Luxemburg was an enthusiastic and highly successful teacher, known for her Socratic method of questioning students to help them develop "an airtight solution" for themselves. Her lectures formed the basis for two of her major economic works, Introduction to Political Economy and The Accumulation of Capital.

This period also marked the definitive end of Luxemburg's relationship with Jogiches. He escaped from prison in Warsaw and arrived in Berlin in April 1907, only to be told their relationship was over. His violent reaction, including threats to kill her, shocked and frightened her. The personal break was a source of great pain, but according to biographer Raya Dunayevskaya, it coincided with her reaching new heights of intellectual and organizational independence. Luxemburg had already begun a new relationship with Konstantin (Kostja) Zetkin, the 22-year-old son of her close friend and comrade Clara Zetkin.

=== Break with Kautsky ===
The temporary truce in the SPD between the radicals and the leadership ended abruptly in 1910 over the question of Prussian suffrage. The Prussian three-class franchise was a long-standing grievance, and a new government bill that failed to introduce equal suffrage sparked a wave of mass demonstrations and strikes. Luxemburg saw this as a golden opportunity to put her mass strike theory into practice and to push the party in a more revolutionary direction. She embarked on an intensive speaking tour, and in a series of articles, beginning with "What Next?", she called for the party to escalate the struggle, including through republican agitation.

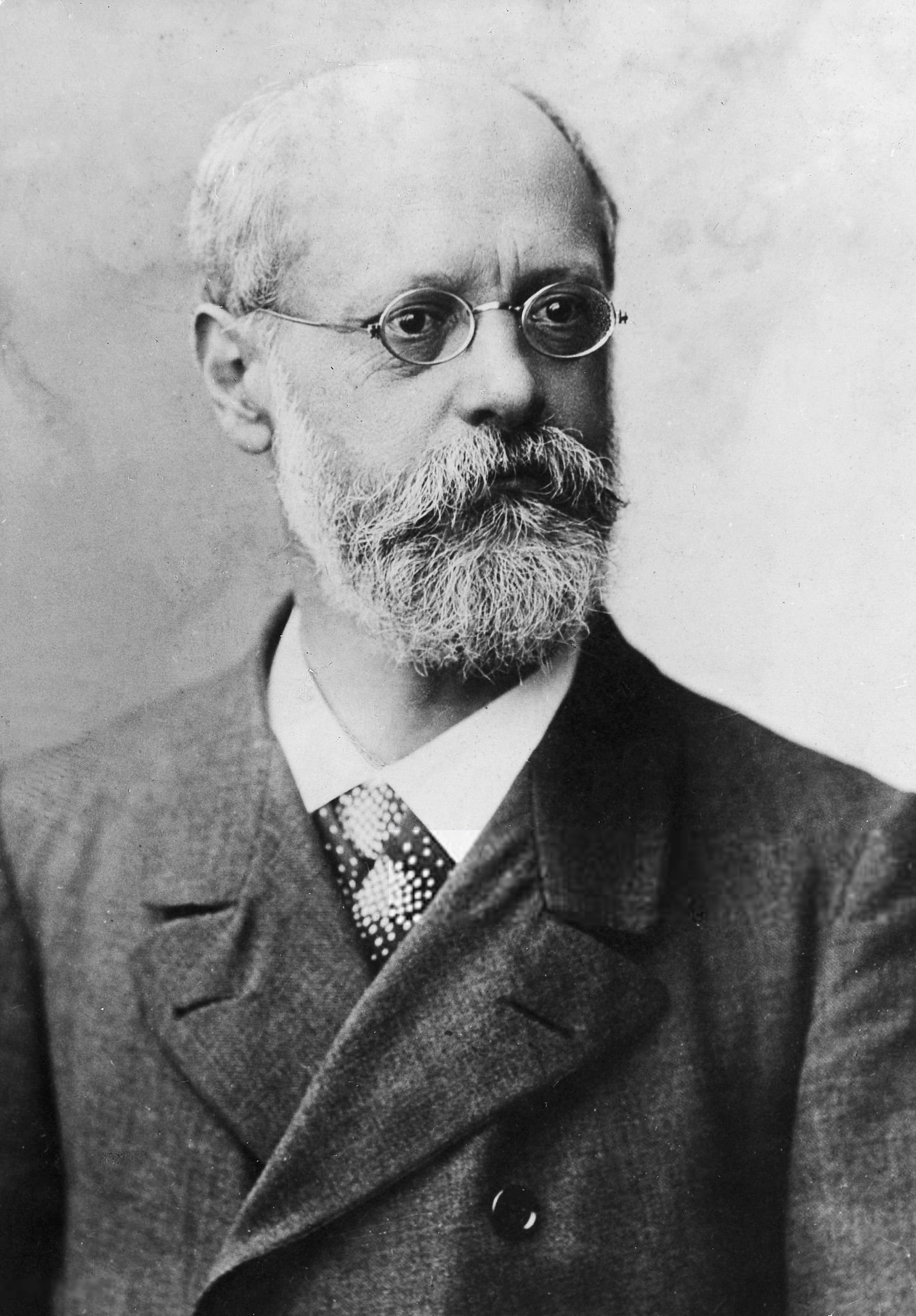
Karl Kautsky

The party executive, however, was wary of such radical tactics, fearing they would alienate bourgeois allies and jeopardize the upcoming Reichstag elections. Kautsky, now the chief defender of the party's cautious "strategy of attrition" (Ermattungsstrategie), refused to publish her article in Die Neue Zeit, allegedly editing out her call for a mass strike. This refusal marked the beginning of a bitter and public polemic between the two former allies, which permanently destroyed their friendship and intellectual partnership. While Kautsky argued that the mass strike should only be used as a "defensive" tactic when democracy itself was threatened, Luxemburg insisted it should also be an "offensive" weapon to transform society. Luxemburg accused Kautsky of cowardice and of abandoning Marxist principles for parliamentary expediency. Kautsky, in turn, portrayed her as a reckless adventurer whose "rebel's impatience" threatened to lead the party to ruin. The break was accompanied by sexist invective from party leaders like August Bebel.

The controversy effectively ended Luxemburg's influence with the SPD's centrist leadership. She was now increasingly isolated, a leader of a small but growing radical opposition within the party. Although her resolution on the mass strike was defeated at the 1910 Magdeburg congress, the debate had drawn a clear line between her revolutionary strategy and the executive's policy of waiting for history to run its course. The conflict intensified in 1911 during the Agadir Crisis, when she again clashed with the leadership over what she saw as their passive and inadequate response to the threat of imperialist war.

== Theorist of imperialism (1912–1914) ==
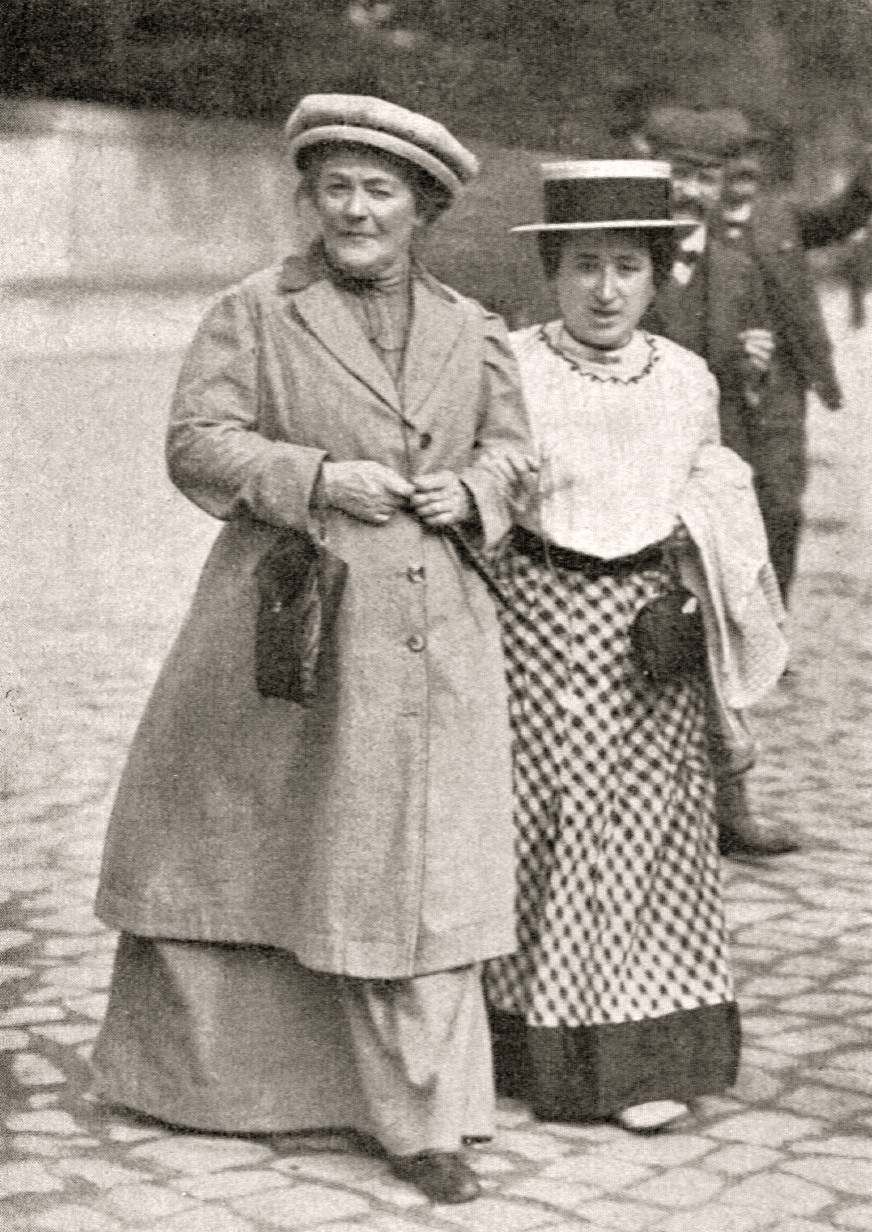
Luxemburg (right) with Clara Zetkin, 1910

The years before the outbreak of World War I were marked by Luxemburg's growing alienation from the SPD's leadership and her development of a comprehensive theory of imperialism. The party's electoral victory in 1912, which made it the largest party in the Reichstag, was followed by an electoral pact with the liberal Progressive Party in the run-off elections. When the Progressives failed to reciprocate the SPD's support, Luxemburg launched a scathing critique, arguing that "real class interests are stronger than any 'arrangements'". For her, the episode demonstrated the futility of parliamentary tactics and the naive belief in alliances with bourgeois parties. She became increasingly disillusioned with the parliamentary group's growing influence, which she saw as corroding the party's revolutionary spirit.

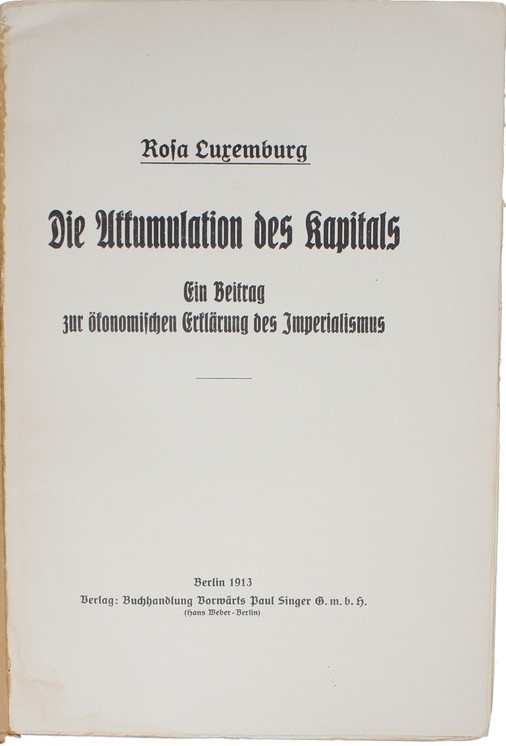
Title page of The Accumulation of Capital (1913)

This period of opposition culminated in her major theoretical work, The Accumulation of Capital, published in 1913. The book originated from her teaching at the SPD party school and her attempt to resolve a technical problem in Marx's theory of capitalist reproduction. Her central thesis was that capitalism, as a closed system, could not realise the surplus value it generated and was therefore dependent on a constant expansion into non-capitalist economies and social strata for its survival and accumulation. This "cannibalization" of pre-capitalist societies was, for Luxemburg, the economic root of imperialism. In contrast to other Marxists like Lenin, she argued that imperialism was not just the "last stage of capitalism" but had been an integral part of capitalism from its earliest beginnings.

In developing her theory, she drew upon her studies of non-Western societies in her unfinished Introduction to Political Economy, where she analysed the destructive impact of European expansion on "primitive communist" societies around the world. Her analysis notably focused on the "permanent process of coercive expropriation" that imperialism represented, highlighting its violent destruction of non-capitalist societies as an ongoing feature of capital accumulation, not just an initial phase. She displayed a notable "anthropological sensitivity", detailing the destruction of the English peasantry, Native Americans, and enslaved Africans, as well as the effects of British colonialism in India and China, and French colonialism in Algeria. She was an early and vocal opponent of German colonialism, denouncing the extermination of the Herero and Nama peoples in modern-day Namibia.

The book was a monumental effort, which Luxemburg later claimed to have written in an ecstatic state in just four months. Though she intended it to demonstrate the economic inevitability of capitalism's collapse, it was met with sharp criticism from many leading Marxists, including Kautsky, Lenin, Otto Bauer, and Nikolai Bukharin, who rejected her core premise. The book established her reputation as a brilliant, if unorthodox, theorist and provided the intellectual foundation for her intensifying struggle against imperialism. She saw her economic analysis as providing the theoretical foundation for this practical struggle, which she believed required a revolutionary strategy rather than the hope of a more moderate, peaceful form of imperialism.

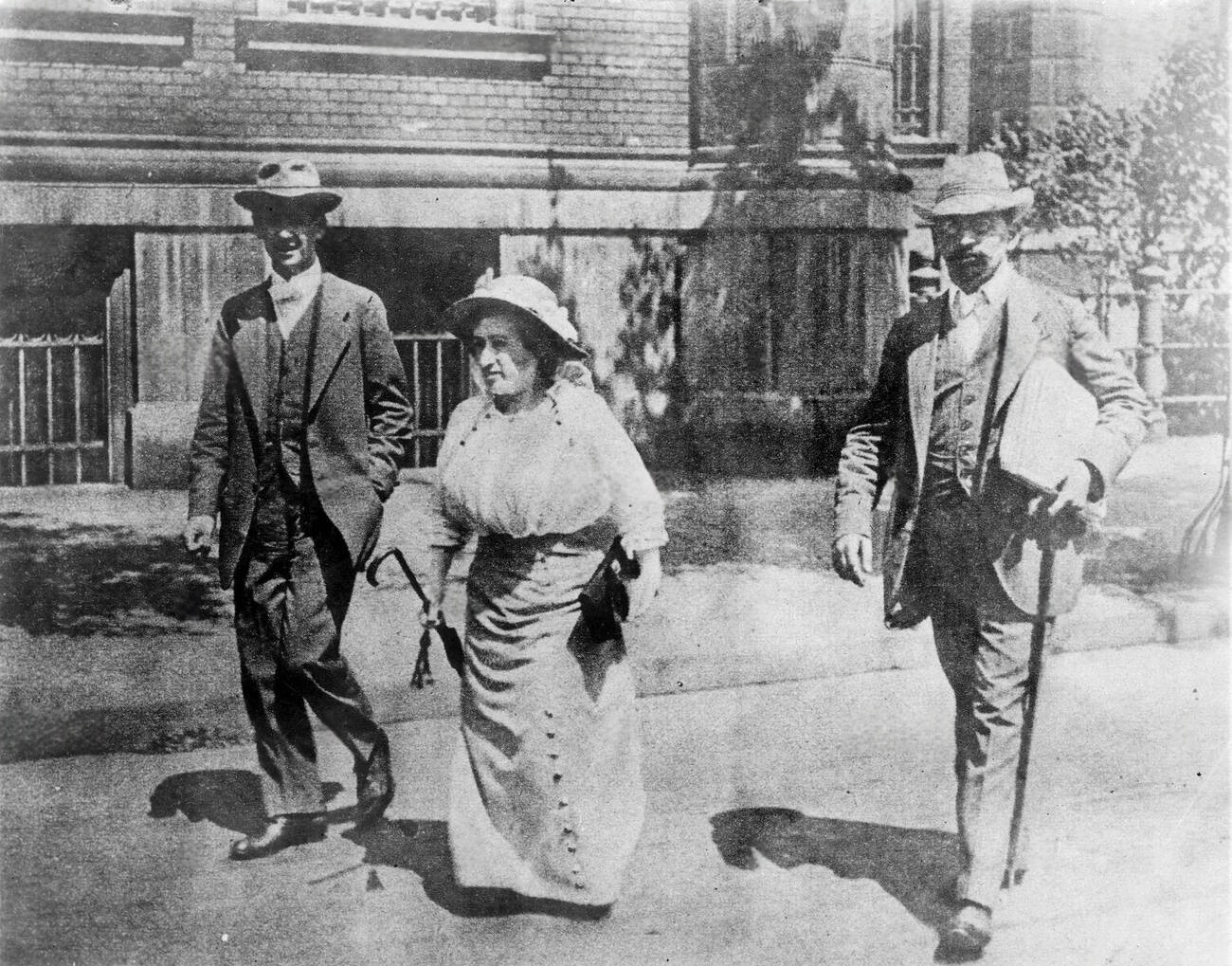
Luxemburg with her lawyers Paul Levi (left) and Kurt Rosenfeld (right), 1914

Luxemburg's anti-militarist agitation also brought her into direct conflict with the state. In September 1913, she gave a speech in Bockenheim, near Frankfurt, in which she called on German workers to refuse to take up arms against their "French and other brethren". She was charged with inciting soldiers to mutiny and tried in February 1914. She used the trial as a platform to launch a political assault on militarism and the ruling class, turning her defence into an indictment of the society that was prosecuting her. Sentenced to a year in prison, she embarked on a whistle-stop speaking tour while her appeal was pending, drawing large and sympathetic crowds. A second trial for insulting the army followed, based on her allegations of routine abuse of soldiers in the German military. The authorities, hoping to make a test case, were flooded with evidence of such maltreatment, and the trial was eventually adjourned indefinitely. These trials raised Luxemburg's public profile to a height not seen since 1910 and rallied a growing opposition around the banner of anti-militarism. During the trials, she began a brief but intense affair with her lawyer, Paul Levi.

== World War I (1914–1918) ==
The outbreak of World War I in August 1914 and the subsequent collapse of the Second International were the defining catastrophes of Luxemburg's political life. On 4 August, the SPD's Reichstag delegation voted unanimously for war credits, a decision that signified the capitulation of European social democracy to nationalism. Luxemburg, who was in Berlin, was devastated. Together with Karl Liebknecht, Clara Zetkin, Franz Mehring and a small circle of friends, she immediately began to organize an opposition. On 10 September 1914, they issued their first public declaration against the party's policy, disassociating themselves from the SPD leadership and calling for a new International. This group, initially known as the Gruppe Internationale, became the nucleus of the Spartacus League (Spartakusbund).

=== Imprisonment and writings ===
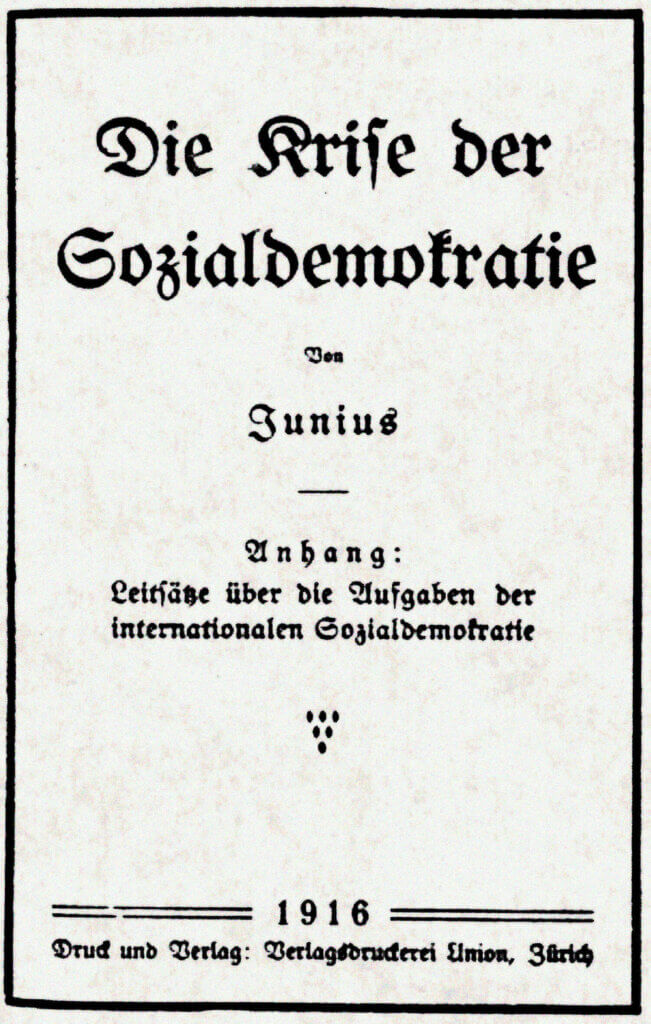
Cover of the Junius Pamphlet, written in 1915 and published in 1916

Luxemburg spent most of the war in prison. On 18 February 1915, she was arrested to serve the one-year sentence from her 1914 Frankfurt trial. During this imprisonment in the Barnimstrasse women's prison in Berlin, she wrote The Crisis of Social Democracy, which became known as the Junius Pamphlet after the pseudonym she used. Considered the ideological foundation of the Spartacus League, it delivered a devastating analysis of the war as an imperialist conflict for which all sides were responsible, and a searing indictment of the SPD's betrayal. The central idea of the pamphlet—to use the crisis of war to hasten the revolution—drew on the 1907 resolution of the Second International, which Luxemburg herself had co-authored. She argued that in the age of imperialism, national wars of defence were no longer possible and that the only alternative for the proletariat was international class struggle against the war, summed up in the slogan "socialism or barbarism". This phrase marked a definitive break from revolutionary fatalism by explicitly posing socialism not as an inevitability but as an objective historical possibility. This established an "open" view of history in which the outcome depended on the conscious action of the proletariat.

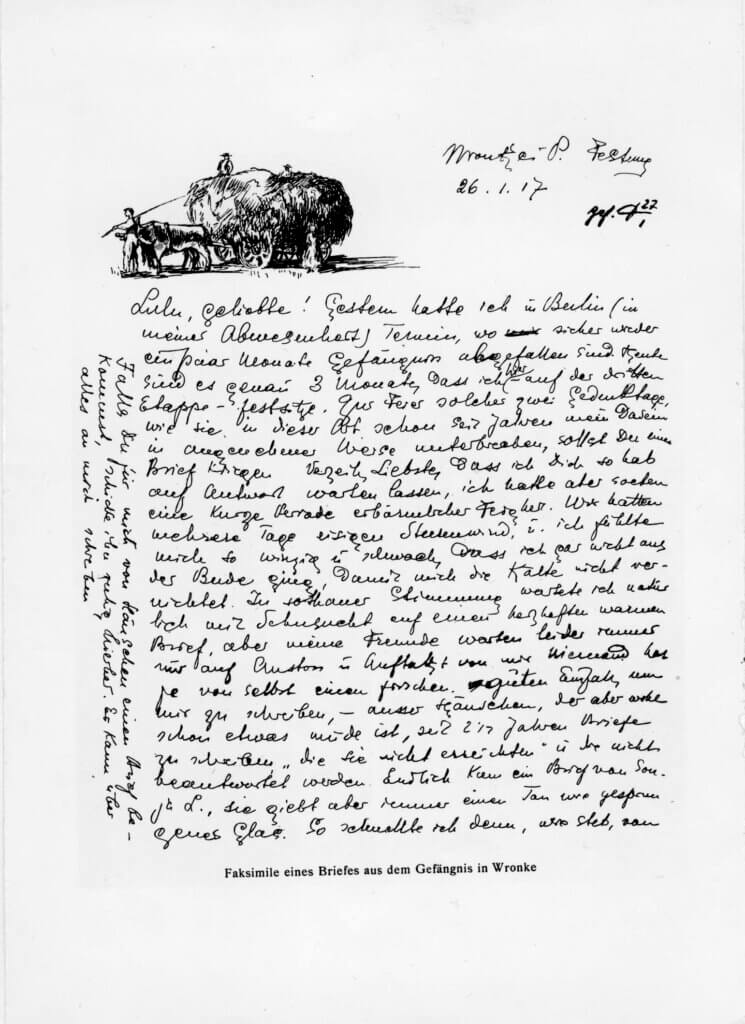
Letter from Luxemburg to Luise Kautsky, 26 January 1917

After her release in February 1916, Luxemburg was re-arrested on 10 July 1916 and held in "protective custody" without trial. She was moved between prisons in Barnimstrasse, the notorious Alexanderplatz interrogation cells, the fortress at Wronki, and finally the town prison in Breslau. The six weeks at Alexanderplatz were the worst, where she was held in a tiny, dark cell. Conditions at Wronki, by contrast, were "slothful, comfortable", and she had the run of the fortress walls. Prison became a period of intense intellectual and personal activity for Luxemburg. Though cut off from direct political action, she maintained a prolific correspondence with her friends, particularly Clara Zetkin, Luise Kautsky, and Sophie Liebknecht. In her letters to a new set of confidantes, including Mathilde Jacob, who acted as her link to the outside world, she revealed her vulnerability, her deep love of nature, and her profound empathy for the suffering of others. She collected flowers and plants during her walks, studied botany, and cared for injured animals, once nursing a disabled pigeon back to health. She famously wrote to Sophie Liebknecht about her encounter with abused Romanian buffaloes in the prison yard, an episode that crystallized for her the intertwined cruelty of war and the human capacity for empathy.

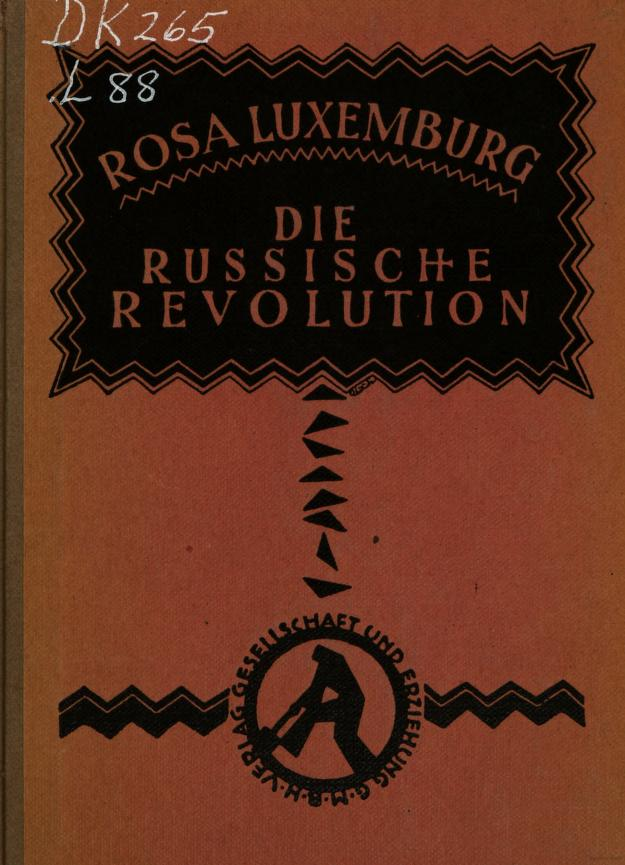
Cover of The Russian Revolution, written in 1918 and published in 1922

The Russian Revolution of 1917 was a source of both hope and profound concern for Luxemburg. She celebrated the overthrow of Tsarism but became increasingly critical of the Bolsheviks after they seized power in October. In a manuscript written in her Breslau prison in 1918 (published posthumously by Paul Levi in 1922 as The Russian Revolution), she offered a comradely but sharp critique of Bolshevik policy from a leftist perspective. The pamphlet's publication sparked an intense and ongoing debate over whether Luxemburg had changed her mind after leaving prison, with comrades like Clara Zetkin arguing that she had. At stake in the controversy was not just Luxemburg's view of Lenin's actions, but the proper balance in revolutionary theory between mass "spontaneity" and the "consciousness" provided by a vanguard party.

While praising Lenin and Leon Trotsky for having the courage to make a revolution, she identified three major failings in their policies: their suppression of the Constituent Assembly, their agrarian policy of distributing land to individual peasants rather than nationalizing it, and their support for the right of nations to self-determination. She condemned their resort to terror and their abolition of democratic freedoms like the freedom of the press and assembly, famously arguing that "Freedom is always and exclusively freedom for the one who thinks differently." She elaborated in a prophetic warning against the rise of a new bureaucracy:

Without general elections, without unrestricted freedom of press and assembly, without a free struggle of opinion, life dies out in every public institution, becomes a mere semblance of life, in which only the bureaucracy remains as the active element. Public life gradually falls asleep, a few dozen party leaders of inexhaustible energy and boundless experience direct and rule. Among them, in reality only a dozen outstanding heads do the leading and an elite of the working class is invited from time to time to meetings where they are to applaud the speeches of the leaders, and to approve proposed resolutions unanimously—at bottom, then, a clique affair—a dictatorship, to be sure, not the dictatorship of the proletariat, however, but only the dictatorship of a handful of politicians.

Her critique was motivated by her faith in the spontaneous political activity of the masses, which she believed was the unique source of revolutionary value. At the same time, she explicitly defended the Bolsheviks' use of force against the counter-revolutionary bourgeoisie, writing that "socialist dictatorship... cannot shrink from any use of force to secure or prevent certain measures involving the interests of the whole." For Luxemburg, the Bolsheviks' errors stemmed from the isolation of the Russian Revolution, which could only be saved by a successful proletarian revolution in the West, especially in Germany. The Bolsheviks, she wrote, represented "all the revolutionary honor and capacity which western Social-Democracy lacked." She insisted that the best way to aid the Russian Revolution was for workers' movements in other countries to end their "terrible isolation by making revolutions in their own countries".

== German Revolution and death (1918–1919) ==
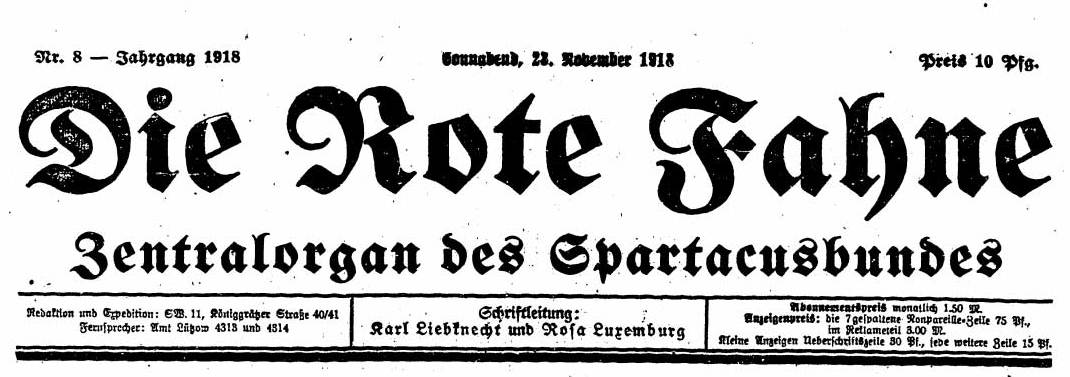
Header from Die Rote Fahne listing Luxemburg and Karl Liebknecht as editors, 23 November 1918

Luxemburg was released from prison on 9 November 1918, in the midst of the German Revolution of 1918–1919. Her hair had turned white, and her health had deteriorated. She travelled immediately to Berlin and plunged into the revolutionary turmoil. Together with Karl Liebknecht, she took over the leadership of the Spartacus League and began publishing its daily newspaper, Die Rote Fahne (The Red Flag). She forcefully articulated the Spartacist programme: the overthrow of the provisional government of Friedrich Ebert, the disarming of the counter-revolutionary troops, and the transfer of all power to the workers' and soldiers' councils.

At the turn of the year, from 30 December 1918 to 1 January 1919, the Spartacus League, along with other radical groups, founded the Communist Party of Germany (KPD). In her programme speech to the founding congress, Luxemburg laid out her vision of revolution. She rejected both a Blanquist-style seizure of power by a minority and a purely parliamentary path to socialism. Revolution, she argued, must be the work of the masses themselves, a protracted process of class struggle from below, in which the workers would learn to wield power through their own action and experience. Although she and the other leaders advised participation in the upcoming elections for a National Assembly, the congress, dominated by young and impatient radicals, voted against their advice.

=== Spartacist uprising and assassination ===
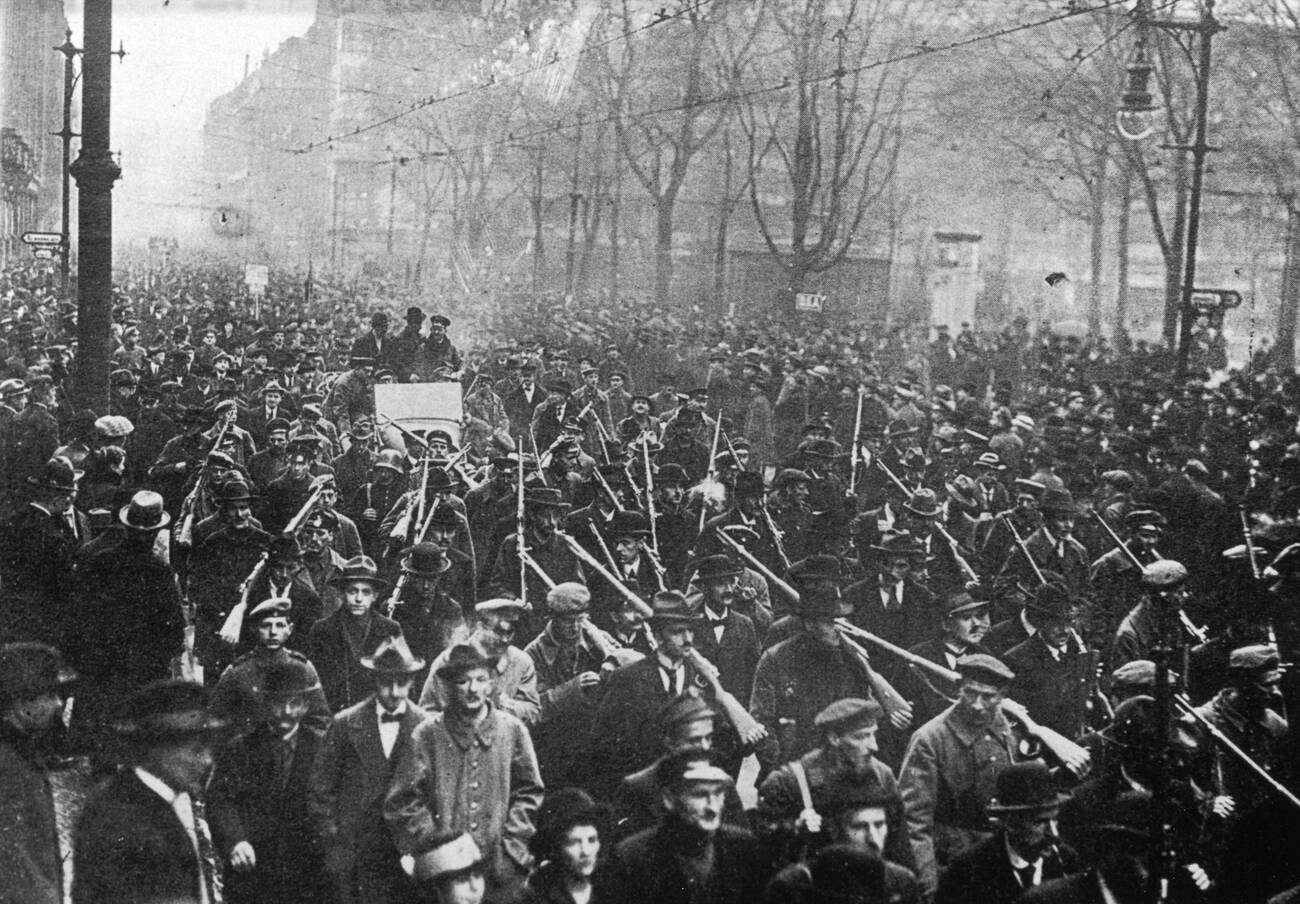
Armed workers during the Spartacist uprising in Berlin, 1919

In early January 1919, a second revolutionary wave swept Berlin. The dismissal of the popular but radical police chief of Berlin, Emil Eichhorn, by the Ebert government sparked a mass demonstration on 5 January, organized by the Revolutionary Shop Stewards, the left wing of the Independent Social Democrats (USPD), and the KPD. The demonstration was far larger than expected, and a Revolutionary Committee, including Liebknecht, was hastily formed to lead the movement. This Spartacist uprising was not a planned putsch by the KPD. Luxemburg initially thought it a mistake, believing the moment was not yet ripe for an overthrow of the government, but once the masses were on the streets, she felt it was the duty of revolutionaries to support them. In Die Rote Fahne, she passionately urged the workers on.

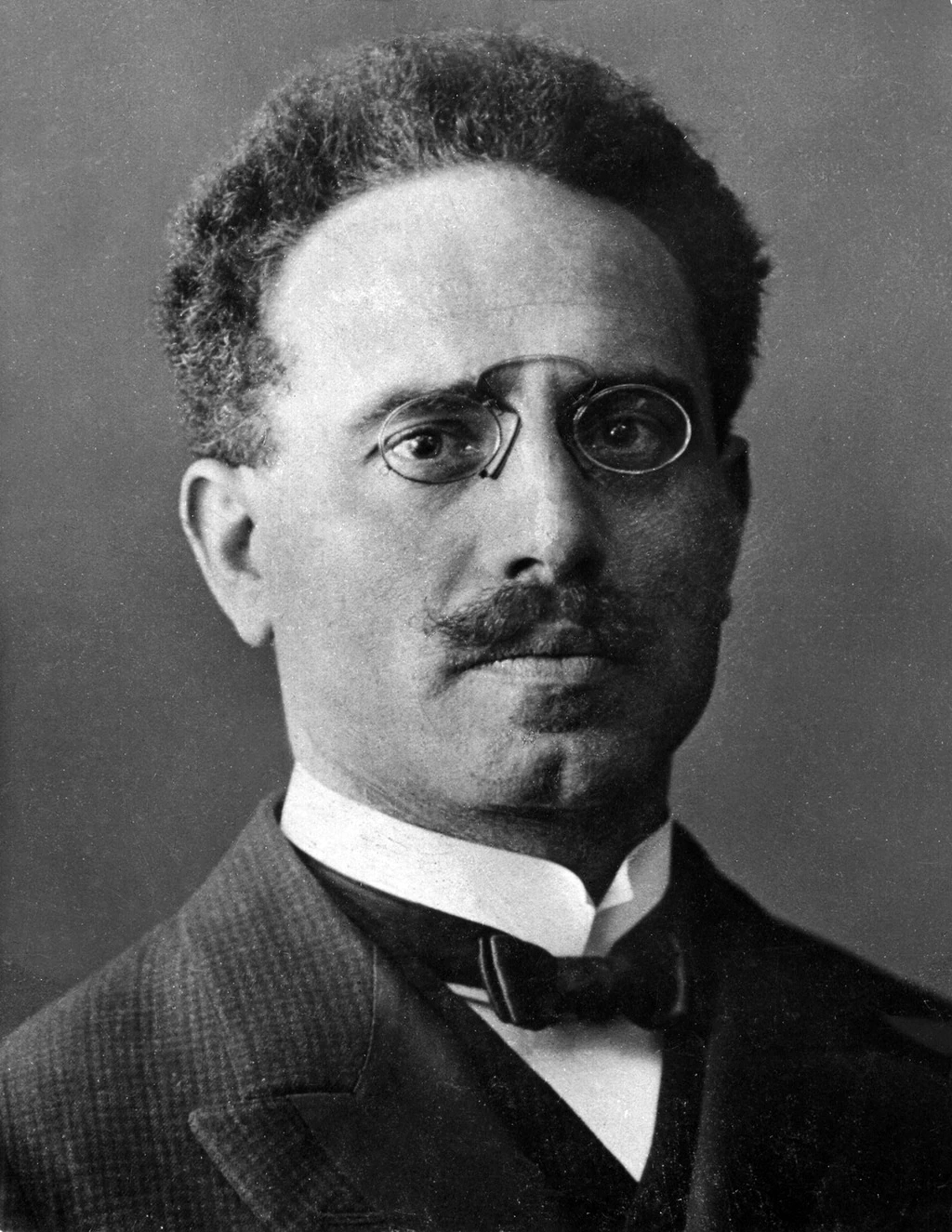
Karl Liebknecht

The government, led by Ebert and his defence minister Gustav Noske, moved decisively to crush the revolt. They employed the Freikorps, newly formed right-wing paramilitary units composed of demobilised soldiers and officers, to suppress the uprising. By 13 January, the fighting was largely over and the revolt crushed. The Spartacist leaders went into hiding. On the evening of 15 January, Luxemburg and Liebknecht were discovered in an apartment in the Wilmersdorf district of Berlin by the Wilmersdorfer Bürgerwehr, a citizen militia. They were arrested and handed over to the Guards Cavalry Rifle Division. They were taken to the division's headquarters at the Eden Hotel, where they were interrogated by the commander, Captain Waldemar Pabst. Liebknecht was taken out first, shot, and delivered to a mortuary as an "unidentified man". Luxemburg was then led out. A soldier named Otto Runge struck her on the head with his rifle butt as she left the hotel, and she was struck a second time before being bundled into a car. There, she was shot in the head, and her body, weighted with stones, was thrown into the Landwehr Canal. Her body was not found until 31 May 1919.

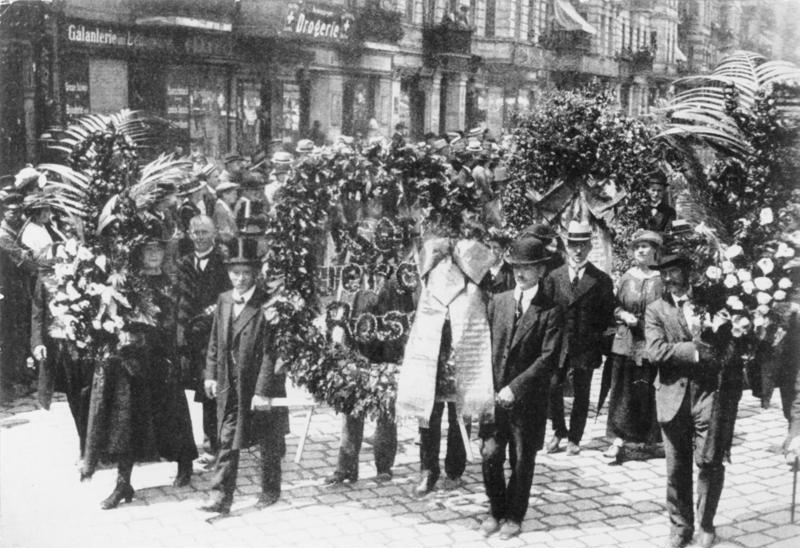
Funeral procession as part of Rosa Luxemburg's burial. June 13, 1919

The assassinations were ordered by Captain Pabst, who in later years claimed he had obtained tacit approval from Noske. When Pabst asked Noske for permission, Noske allegedly told him to consult with his superior, General Walther von Lüttwitz, and when Pabst replied that he would never get permission, Noske responded: "Then you will have to take responsibility for what must be done." According to Pabst's later accounts, the actual shooter was naval lieutenant Hermann Souchon, who jumped onto the footboard of the car and shot Luxemburg at close range after receiving the order from Pabst. The assassinations provoked widespread outrage. The subsequent military trial of the perpetrators was widely seen as a sham, as it was conducted by their own comrades and presided over by Pabst's friend, Wilhelm Canaris. The main instigator, Pabst, and the alleged shooter, Souchon, were never charged. Otto Runge, who had struck both victims, received a two-year sentence. The transport leader, Lieutenant Kurt Vogel, was sentenced to two years and four months for disposing of the body. Vogel later escaped from prison with the help of Canaris.

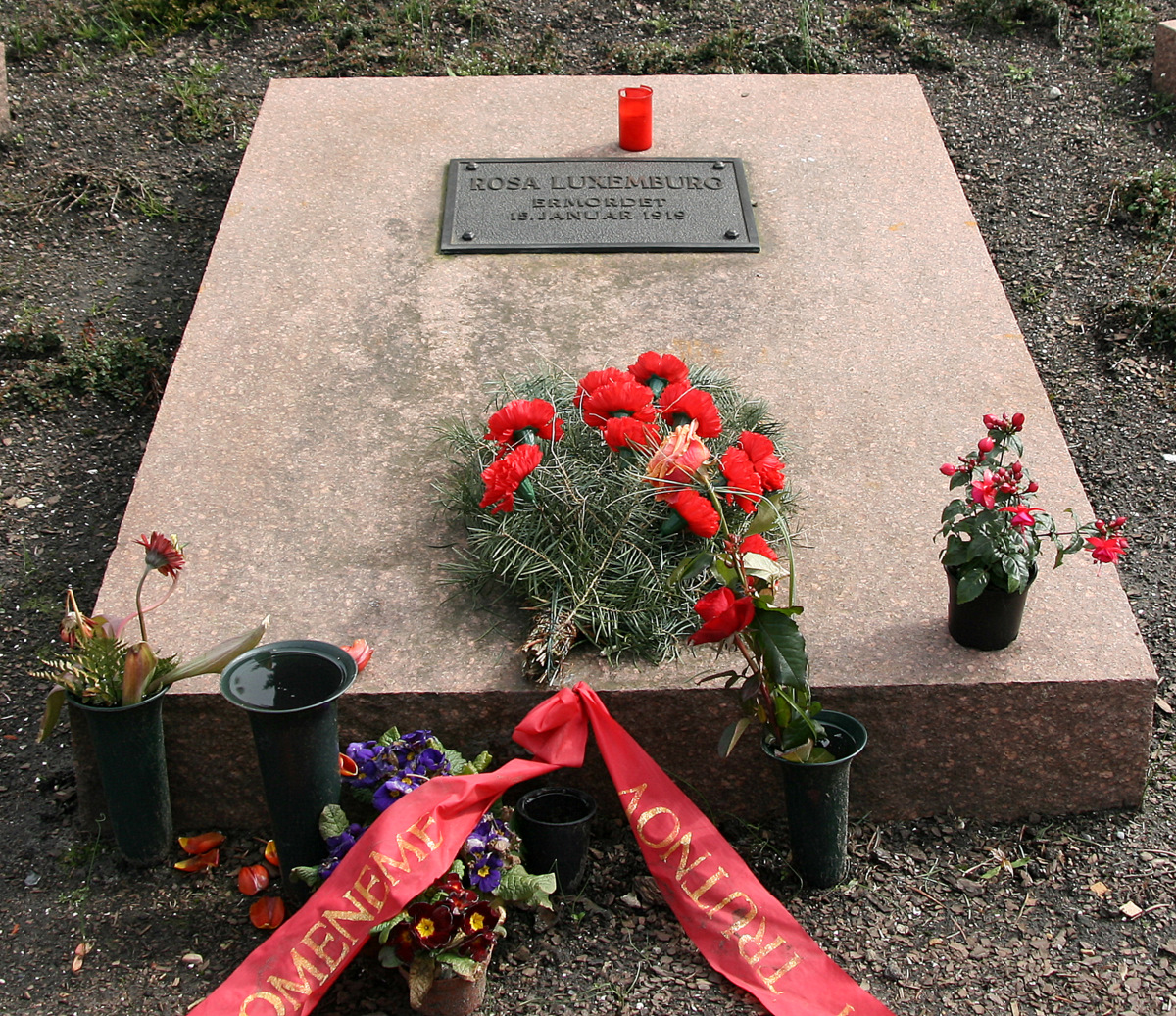
Luxemburg's grave in Zentralfriedhof Friedrichsfelde, Berlin

In 2009, the identification of the buried remains was questioned following the discovery of a preserved female corpse in the cellar of Berlin's Charité hospital. Forensic pathologist Michael Tsokos argued it was likely Luxemburg's body, citing features consistent with her (including legs of differing lengths), signs that the body had been submerged, and discrepancies in the original 1919 autopsy. However, a DNA test with a relative proved inconclusive, and the identity of the discovered corpse remains unconfirmed.

== Thought ==
As a significant Marxist theorist, Luxemburg's work focused on the strategy of revolution, the nature of capitalism, and the meaning of socialist democracy. She was a firm believer in the dialectical materialism of Karl Marx and Friedrich Engels, viewing history as a dynamic process and insisting on the inseparability of theory and practice.

=== Revolutionary socialism and critique of reformism ===
Luxemburg's most famous contribution to political theory was her intervention in the revisionist debate in the SPD at the turn of the 20th century. In her 1900 pamphlet Social Reform or Revolution?, she mounted a defence of orthodox Marxism against the reformist theories of Eduard Bernstein. Bernstein had argued that capitalism had adapted and was not heading for an inevitable collapse, and that socialists should therefore abandon the goal of revolution and work for gradual, piecemeal reforms within the existing system.

Luxemburg argued that this presented a false choice between reform and revolution. For her, the two were dialectically linked: the daily struggle for reforms (such as the eight-hour day or improved trade union rights) was the only means by which the proletariat could become conscious of its class power and prepare itself for the revolutionary seizure of power. To abandon the final goal of revolution, she argued, was to transform the socialist movement into a petit-bourgeois reformist party, severing its practical activity from its ultimate purpose and effectively accepting the permanence of capitalism. The fight for reforms was the means of the class struggle; the social revolution was its aim. Her response to Bernstein's famous dictum, "The final goal, whatever it may be, is nothing to me, the movement is everything," was to state, "The movement as an end in itself, unrelated to the ultimate goal, is nothing to me; the ultimate goal is everything."

=== Mass strike, spontaneity, and the role of the party ===
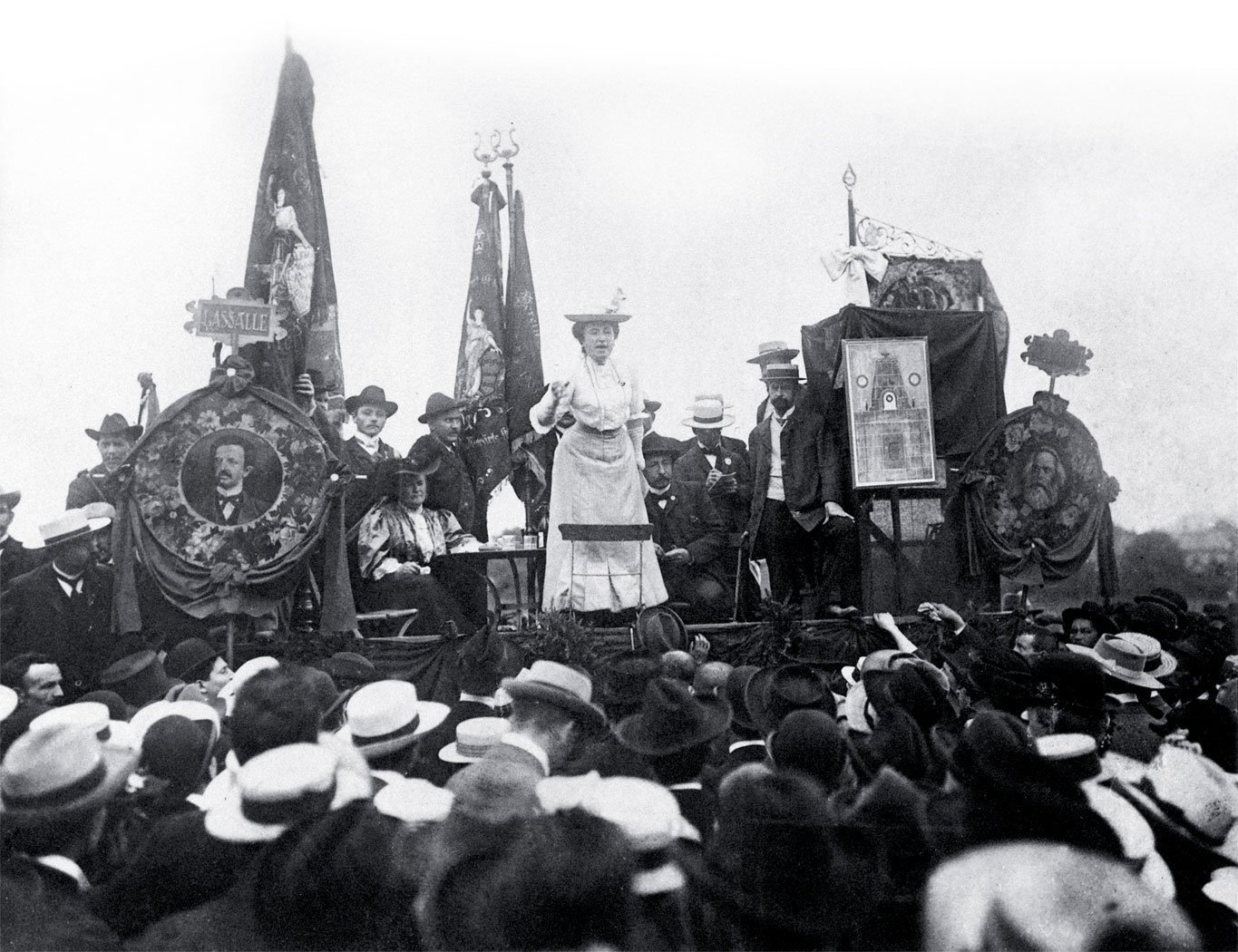
Luxemburg addressing a crowd during the 1907 Stuttgart Congress of the Second International

Drawing on the experience of the 1905 Russian Revolution, Luxemburg developed her theory of the mass strike as the most important weapon in the proletarian struggle. In her 1906 pamphlet The Mass Strike, the Political Party and the Trade Unions, she argued against the SPD and trade union leadership's view of the mass strike as a single, organised, and controllable action. Instead, she saw it as "the form of movement of the proletarian mass... in the revolution itself", a continuous process in which economic and political struggles merged, and in which strikes, demonstrations, and uprisings would flow into one another.

This theory is often associated with the concept of "spontaneity". For Luxemburg, spontaneity was not a blind, disorganised impulse, but the creative and elemental energy of the masses in action, which the party could not artificially "make" and to which Marxist theory must itself become a historical factor by becoming part of the workers' consciousness. The role of the revolutionary party was not to command the masses like an army, but to "hasten the development of things and endeavor to accelerate events" by giving political leadership, clarity, and direction to the spontaneous movement. This dialectical relationship between the spontaneous action of the masses and the conscious leadership of the party stood in stark contrast to both the bureaucratic caution of the SPD leadership and Vladimir Lenin's more strictly vanguardist conception of the party. In her 1904 essay, "Organizational Questions of Russian Social Democracy", and a 1911 manuscript, "Credo", she critiqued Lenin's ultra-centralist organisational model, arguing that it risked stifling the spontaneous initiative of the working class.

=== Imperialism, nationalism, and war ===
Luxemburg's major theoretical work was The Accumulation of Capital (1913), which she presented as a contribution to the economic clarification of imperialism. She argued that capitalism was driven by an inherent contradiction: it could not realise the surplus value generated within its own closed system, as the revolution would overthrow it long before its economic possibilities were exhausted. To survive and continue to accumulate, it was therefore compelled to expand into and exploit pre-capitalist spheres, both within its home countries (e.g., the peasantry and artisan classes) and, more importantly, in colonies abroad. This ceaseless, competitive drive for control of non-capitalist markets and resources was, for Luxemburg, the economic foundation of imperialism and militarism. Her analysis notably focused on the "permanent process of coercive expropriation" that imperialism represented, highlighting its violent destruction of "primitive communist" and other non-capitalist societies as an ongoing feature of capital accumulation, not just an initial phase.

This economic analysis underpinned her political stance against imperialism and war. For her, "the question of militarism and imperialism... form the central axis of political life". She saw imperialism not as a mere policy choice but as the final, global stage of capitalism, which would inevitably lead to ever more destructive wars and ultimately to "barbarism" unless it was overthrown by international socialist revolution. The tendency toward this final economic collapse created a "period of catastrophe" that made revolution an urgent necessity to pre-empt complete disaster. This conviction was the basis for her consistent internationalism and her critique of nationalism, which she saw as a bourgeois ideology used to divide the working class and tie it to the interests of its own ruling class. Her opposition to the "right of nations to self-determination" as a universal slogan, which put her in direct conflict with Lenin, stemmed from this belief. She argued that in the age of imperialism, such a right was a hollow phrase that often served as a cover for the interests of competing imperialist powers and was a harmful distraction from the international class struggle.

=== Critique of the Russian Revolution ===
Luxemburg enthusiastically welcomed the Russian Revolution but was deeply critical of the Bolsheviks' policies after they seized power. In The Russian Revolution, a manuscript written in prison in 1918 and published after her death, she articulated a fundamental critique of the Bolshevik model of revolution. While praising Lenin and Leon Trotsky for their revolutionary courage, she condemned their suppression of the Constituent Assembly, their restriction of suffrage, and their abolition of democratic freedoms. She argued that "without general elections, without unrestricted freedom of press and assembly, without a free struggle of opinion, life dies out in every public institution, becomes a mere semblance of life, in which only the bureaucracy remains as the active element." Her criticism of the Constituent Assembly's dissolution, however, was based on incomplete information available to her in prison, and she later revised her view, saying it was a "counter-revolutionary stronghold" against the workers' councils.

Her most famous dictum came from this critique: "Freedom is always and exclusively freedom for the one who thinks differently." For Luxemburg, socialist democracy was not something to be granted as a gift after the revolution had been secured, but was the very medium of the revolution itself—the only way for the masses to learn, correct their mistakes, and exercise power. This did not imply a rejection of the dictatorship of the proletariat, which she saw as necessary to implement socialist measures and defend against counter-revolution. She explicitly defended the Bolsheviks' use of force to break the resistance of the bourgeoisie. Her concern was for democracy within the proletarian dictatorship, including a plurality of parties and tendencies, fearing that the substitution of a dictatorship of a party or a committee for the dictatorship of the proletariat would lead not to socialism but to a "brutalization of public life". She believed the Bolsheviks' errors were a product of the fatal isolation of their revolution, and that its only salvation lay in a successful proletarian revolution in the West, especially in Germany.

== Legacy ==
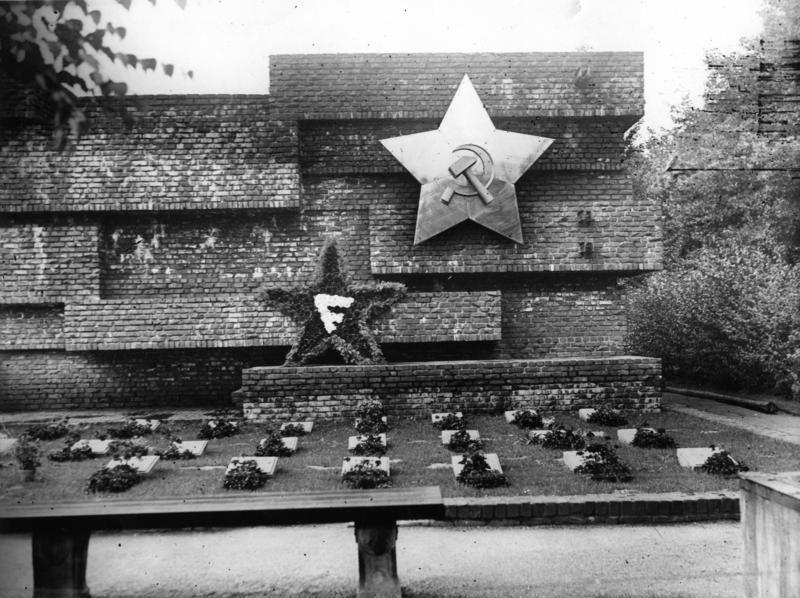
Memorial to Luxemburg and Liebknecht in Zentralfriedhof Friedrichsfelde in Berlin, 1926. It was commissioned by the KPD, and destroyed by the Nazis in 1935.

The murder of Rosa Luxemburg transformed her into a martyr for the revolutionary socialist cause. Her legacy, however, has been a subject of intense debate and political contestation ever since. In the immediate aftermath, the KPD, under the leadership of Paul Levi, revered her as a founder and theorist, and began the process of collecting and publishing her works.

The debate over "Luxemburgism" as a distinct political tendency began in earnest after Levi published her critical manuscript on the Russian Revolution in 1922. This move, part of an internal party struggle, prompted a sharp response from Lenin. In his famous "chicken and eagle" parable, Lenin praised Luxemburg as a revolutionary "eagle" but enumerated her theoretical "errors"—on the national question, the accumulation of capital, party organisation, and the nature of the state—which he argued must be corrected by the party. This set the template for the official Communist interpretation for decades.

During the "Bolshevisation" of the KPD in the mid-1920s, Luxemburgism was systematically constructed as a coherent but fallacious system of thought, a "syphilis bacillus" that needed to be eradicated. The ultra-left faction led by Ruth Fischer and Arkadi Maslow paired Luxemburgism with Trotskyism as a heresy characterised by a theory of "spontaneity" that underestimated the role of the revolutionary party. During the Joseph Stalin era, this critique hardened into dogma. Her repeated attacks on Lenin's concept of centralism continued to "strike a nerve", and in 1931 Stalin wrote an article discrediting Luxemburg by citing Lenin's earlier criticisms and accusing her of composing a "utopian and semi-Menshevik scheme of permanent revolution". Her ideas were either ignored or denounced as a "deadly enemy" of Leninism. Her work provided a "preparatory role" for the development of alternative tendencies within Marxism, such as Western Marxism, which sought to recover the emancipatory goals of socialism from the distortions of both reformism and Stalinism.

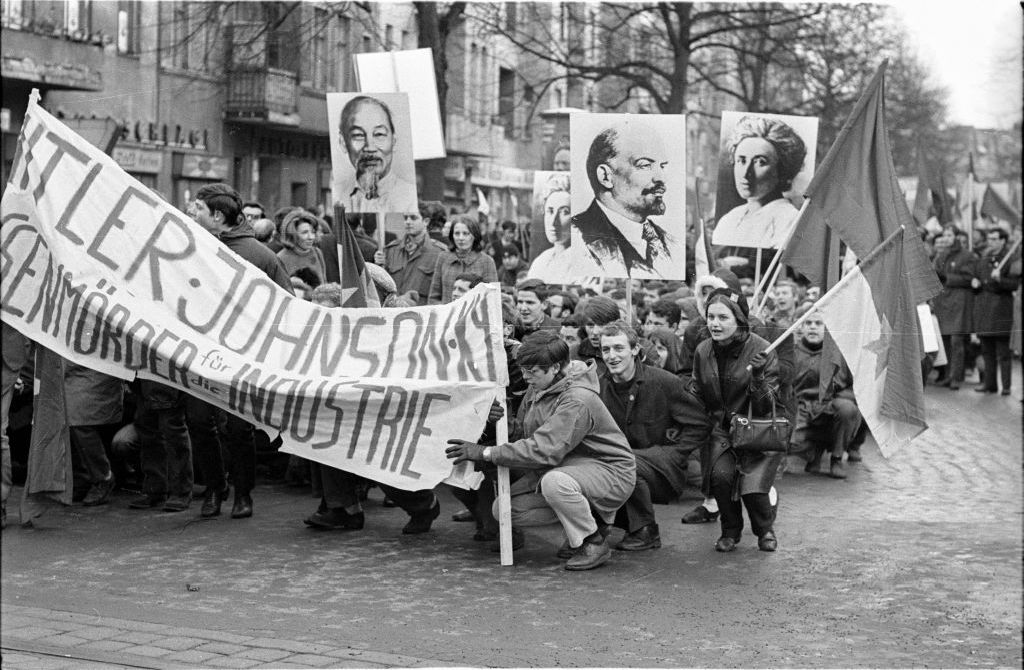
West German student movement demonstration in West Berlin in 1968, featuring an image of Luxemburg

After the death of Stalin in 1953, there was a renewed interest in Luxemburg's work. In Poland and East Germany, she was partially rehabilitated and celebrated as a national revolutionary figure, though her more critical ideas were often downplayed. The reception of her ideas in the United States began in earnest in the 1960s, driven largely by dissidents from the Trotskyist movement and the rising New Left. Figures like Hal Draper presented her as a key representative of "socialism from below", while Raya Dunayevskaya saw her as a crucial theorist of revolutionary humanism. Hannah Arendt's 1966 essay in the New York Review of Books paid tribute to her foresight and independence of mind. Collections of her writings were published by the Socialist Workers Party's Pathfinder Press and by Monthly Review Press, bringing her work to a new generation of activists. More recently, a fifteen-volume English edition of her complete works, supported by the Rosa Luxemburg Foundation and directed by Peter Hudis, has further solidified her place in the Anglophone world.

For many socialists and communists outside the Stalinist tradition, including left communists, Trotskyists, and democratic socialists, she remains a major theoretical and moral touchstone. Her emphasis on democracy and mass action, her critique of bureaucracy and authoritarianism, and her profound humanism continue to inspire revolutionary movements and thinkers around the world. She has been reclaimed by modern scholars and activists for her relevance to feminist, anti-racist, and postcolonial critiques of capitalism, with some, such as Raya Dunayevskaya, highlighting previously ignored feminist dimensions of her life and thought. Her reputation has been particularly strong in the post-colonial world, where, as Michael Löwy notes, she is recognised for having "adopted the viewpoint of the victims of capitalist modernization".

== Commemoration ==
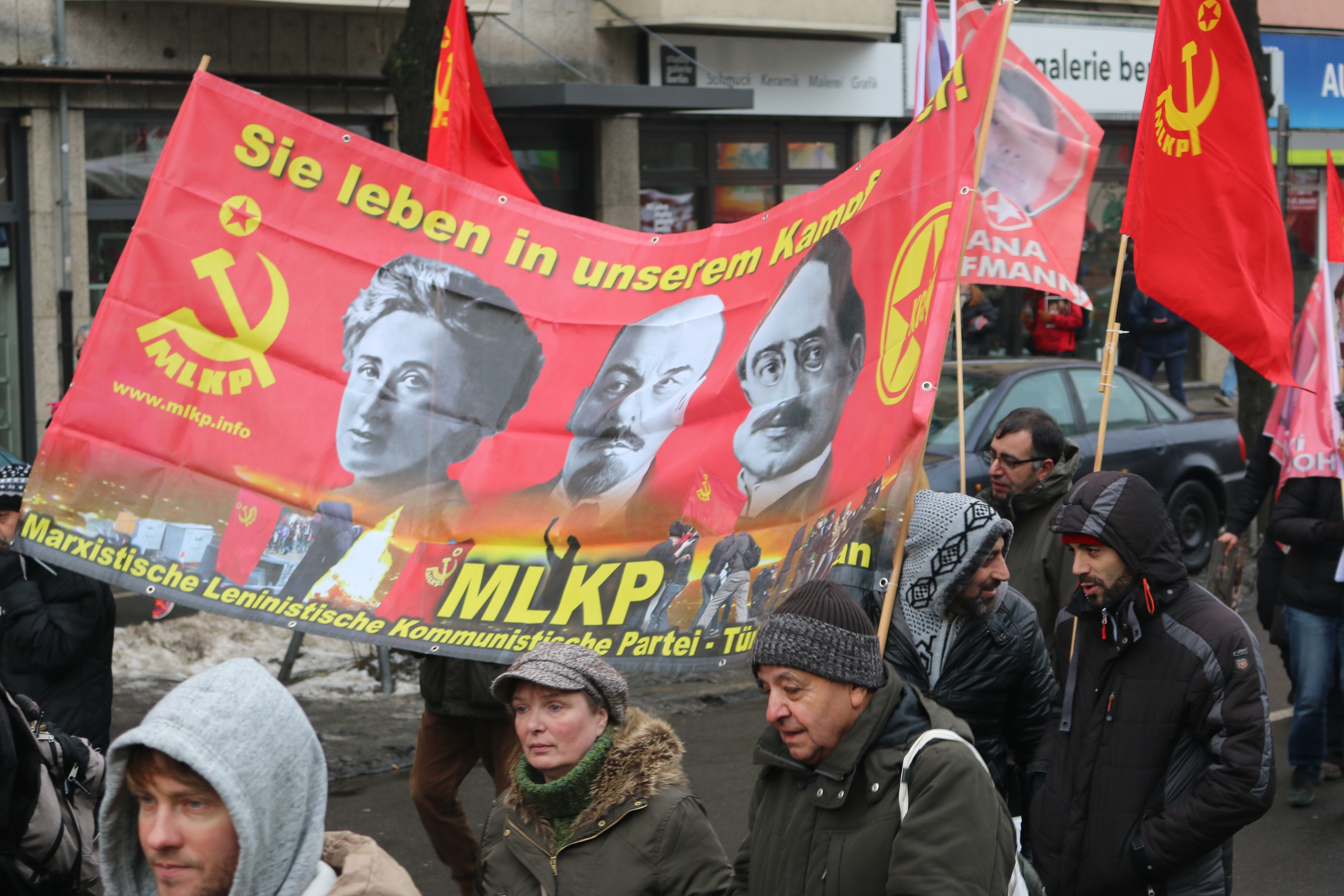
Liebknecht-Luxemburg-Demonstration in Berlin, 2016

In Germany, Luxemburg and Liebknecht are honoured annually on the second weekend of January with the Liebknecht-Luxemburg-Demonstration in Berlin, which ends at the Gedenkstätte der Sozialisten (Socialists' Memorial) in the Zentralfriedhof Friedrichsfelde. During the German Democratic Republic, the demonstration was a state-sponsored event for the ruling Socialist Unity Party of Germany. The 1988 demonstration was famously used by dissidents to protest the government by unfurling a banner with Luxemburg's slogan, "Freiheit ist immer Freiheit der Andersdenkenden" ("Freedom is always the freedom of dissenters"). The German Federal Office for the Protection of the Constitution notes that the idolisation of Luxemburg and Liebknecht remains an important tradition for the German far-left.

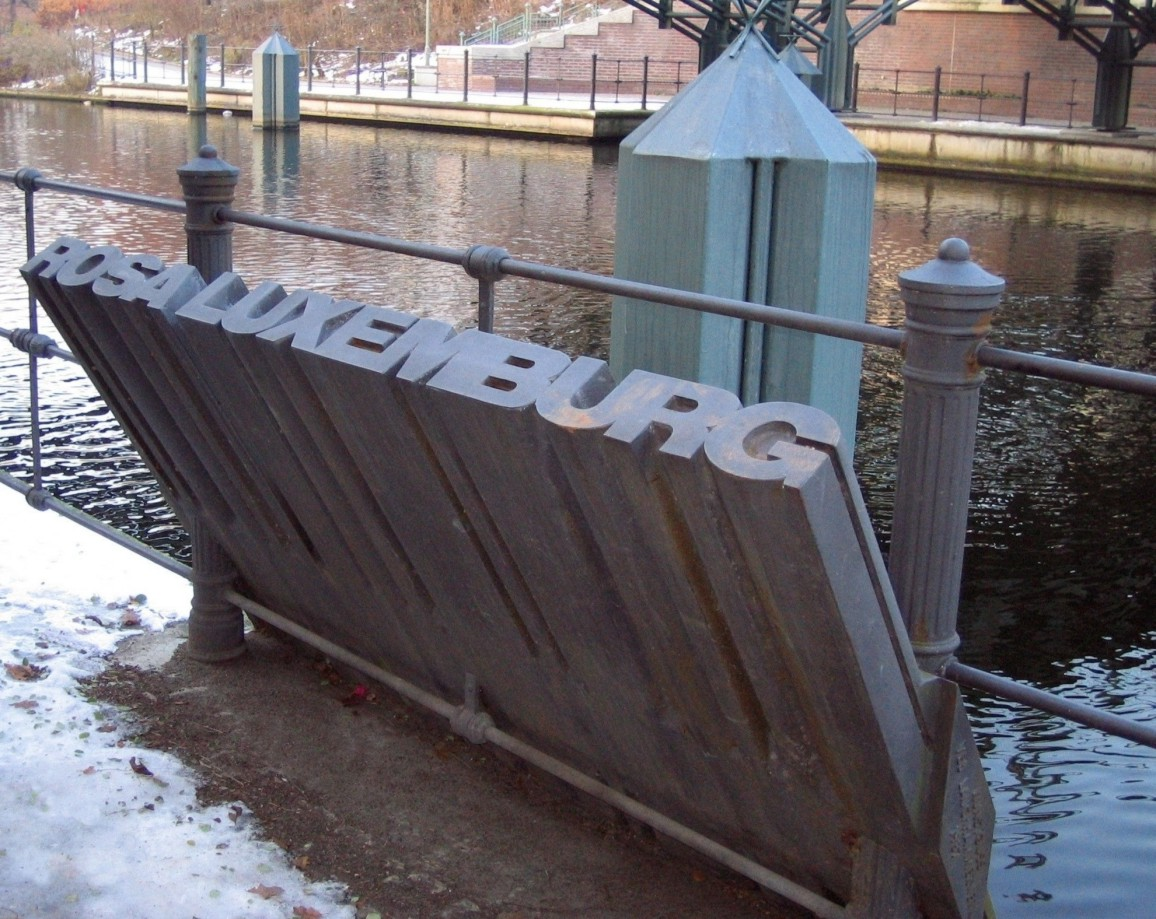
Memorial at the site where Luxemburg's corpse was thrown into the Landwehr Canal

Numerous places in Germany bear her name, notably Rosa-Luxemburg-Platz and its U-Bahn station in Berlin. After German reunification, there were proposals to rename streets and squares in the former East Berlin honouring communist figures, but a commission recommended that Luxemburg's name, among others, should be retained. A memorial to Luxemburg and Liebknecht designed by Ludwig Mies van der Rohe was built in the Zentralfriedhof Friedrichsfelde in 1926 but destroyed by the Nazis in 1935. At the edge of the Tiergarten, a memorial marks the spot on the Landwehr Canal where her body was thrown into the water.

In her native Poland, Luxemburg's legacy is controversial, primarily due to her opposition to Polish independence. During the Polish People's Republic, several places and enterprises were named after her, including a manufacturing facility of electric lamps in the Wola district of Warsaw, the Zakłady Wytwórcze Lamp Elektrycznych im. Róży Luksemburg. A street in Szprotawa used to be named after Luxemburg (ulica Róży Luksemburg) until it was changed to ulica Różana (Rose street) in September 2018. Many other streets and locations in Poland either used to be or still are named after her, such as those in Warsaw, Gliwice, Będzin, Szprotawa, Lublin, Polkowice, Łódź, etc.

Efforts to put up commemorative plaques in her memory have taken place in a number of Polish cities, such as Poznań and her birthplace, Zamość. A 45-minute-long sightseeing tour around areas associated with the life of the Polish revolutionary was organised in Warsaw in 2019, where a statue of her by Alfred Jesion was also put on display at the Warsaw Citadel as part of the Gallery of Polish Sculpture of the 1950s. The commemorative plaque in Poznań, on the building where she lived in during May 1903, was vandalised with paint in 2013. An official petition was started in 2021 to name a square in Wrocław after her, but the local government rejected the proposal.

== In arts and literature ==
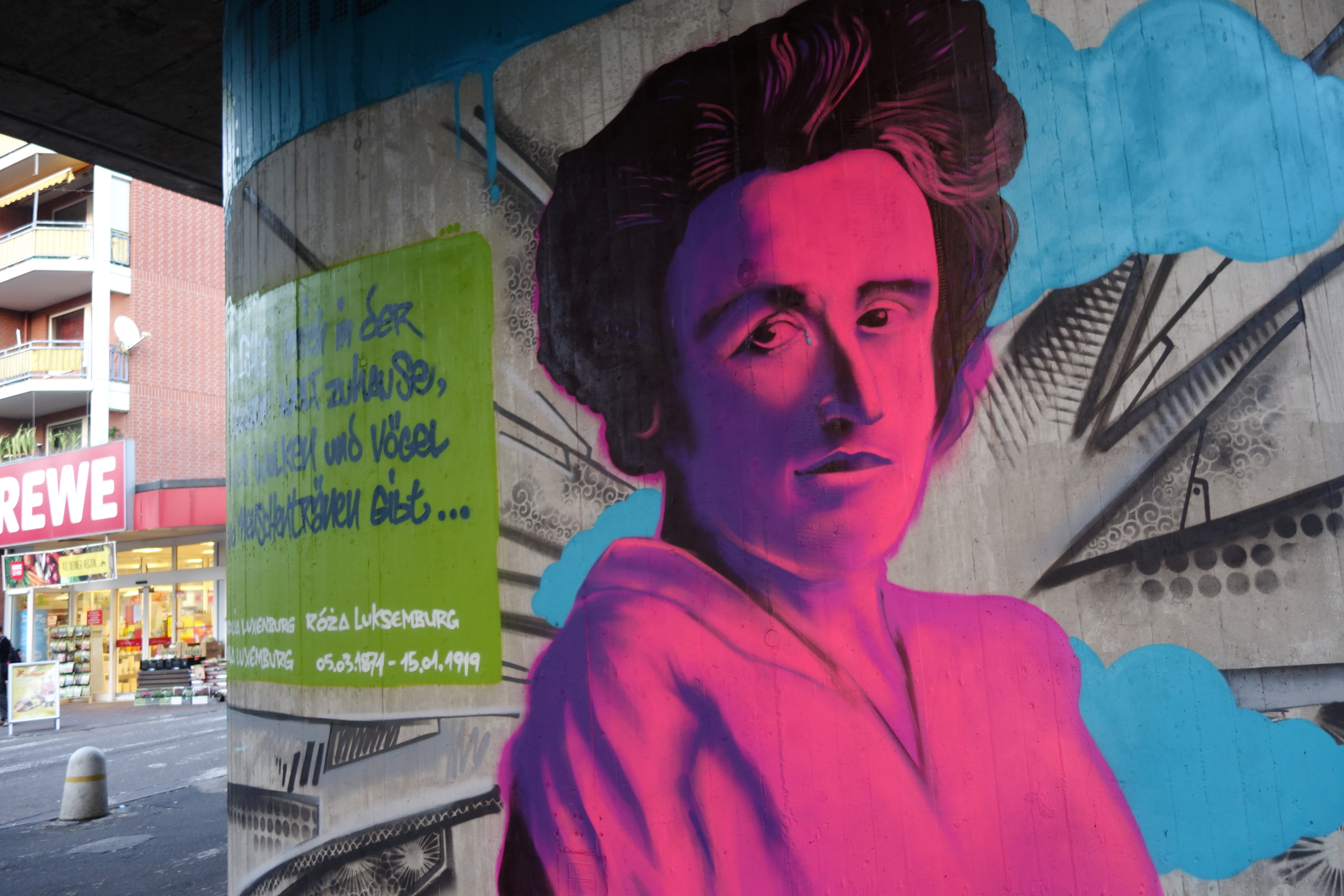
Graffiti portrait on Rosa-Luxemburg-Straße in Frankfurt

Luxemburg's life and death have inspired numerous works of art and literature. Bertolt Brecht's 1919 poem "Epitaph" honours her, and was set to music by Kurt Weill in The Berlin Requiem. In cinema, her story was most famously depicted in Margarethe von Trotta's 1986 biographical film, Rosa Luxemburg, starring Barbara Sukowa, which won the Best Actress award at the 1986 Cannes Film Festival. Von Trotta described Luxemburg as "the first victim of National Socialism". The Quebec painter Jean-Paul Riopelle created a monumental thirty-painting fresco in 1992, Tribute to Rosa Luxemburg, which is on permanent display at the Musée national des beaux-arts du Québec.

She has appeared as a character in several novels, including Alfred Döblin's Karl and Rosa, Andrei Platonov's Chevengur, Jonathan Rabb's Rosa (2005), and William T. Vollmann's historical fiction Europe Central (2005). The graphic novel Red Rosa (2015) by Kate Evans provides a biographical account of her life. The feminist magazine Lux, launched in 2020, is named in her honour, describing her as "one of the most creative minds to remake the socialist tradition".

From 1913 until her death, Luxemburg pursued a lifelong interest in botany by collecting and studying plant specimens. Her personal herbarium, comprising 18 notebooks with 377 specimens, is held at the Archive of Modern Records in Warsaw. She collected many of the plants during her imprisonments, finding in the work a therapeutic escape and a connection to the outside world. The collection, which features plants from Berlin, Wronki, Wrocław, and the Alps, contains handwritten notes on the species, location, and date of collection.

== Selected works ==
- Die industrielle Entwicklung Polens (The Industrial Development of Poland). 1898.
- Sozialreform oder Revolution? (Social Reform or Revolution?). 1899.
- "Miliz und Militarismus" ("Militia and Militarism"). Leipziger Volkszeitung. 1899.
- "Organisationsfragen der russischen Sozialdemokratie" ("Organizational Questions of the Russian Social Democracy"). Die Neue Zeit and Iskra. 1904. Also known as "Leninism or Marxism?".
- Massenstreik, Partei und Gewerkschaften (The Mass Strike, the Political Party and the Trade Unions). 1906.
- "Kwestia narodowościowa i autonomia" ("The National Question and Autonomy"). Przegląd Socjaldemokratyczny. 1908–1909.
- "Die Theorie und die Praxis" ("Theory and Practice"). Die Neue Zeit. 1910.
- "Frauenwahlrecht und Klassenkampf" ("Women's Suffrage and Class Struggle"). Speech. 1912.
- Die Akkumulation des Kapitals. Ein Beitrag zur ökonomischen Erklärung des Imperialismus (The Accumulation of Capital: A Contribution to an Economic Explanation of Imperialism). 1913.
- Die Krise der Sozialdemokratie (The Crisis in German Social Democracy). 1916. Also known as the Junius Pamphlet.
- "Der Anfang" ("The Beginning"). Die Rote Fahne. 18 November 1918.
- "Was will der Spartakusbund?" ("What Does the Spartacus League Want?"). Die Rote Fahne. 14 December 1918.
- "Unsere Programm und die politische Situation" ("Our Program and the Political Situation"). Speech at the Founding Congress of the Communist Party of Germany. 31 December 1918.
- "Die Ordnung herrscht in Berlin" ("Order Prevails in Berlin"). Die Rote Fahne. 14 January 1919.
- Briefe aus dem Gefängnis (Letters from Prison). 1921–1923. Written in 1916–1918. Published posthumously.
- Die Akkumulation des Kapitals oder Was die Epigonen aus der Marxschen Theorie gemacht haben. Eine Antikritik (The Accumulation of Capital, or, What the Epigones Have Made of Marx's Theory: An Anti-Critique). 1921. Written in 1915. Published posthumously.
- Die russische Revolution. Eine kritische Würdigung (The Russian Revolution: A Critical Appreciation). 1922. Written in 1918. Published posthumously.
- Einführung in die Nationalökonomie (Introduction to Political Economy). 1925. Written in 1909–1910. Published posthumously.

== See also ==
- Alexandra Kollontai
- Council communism
- Emma Goldman
- Sylvia Pankhurst
