= Junius Pamphlet =

1915 text written by Rosa Luxemburg

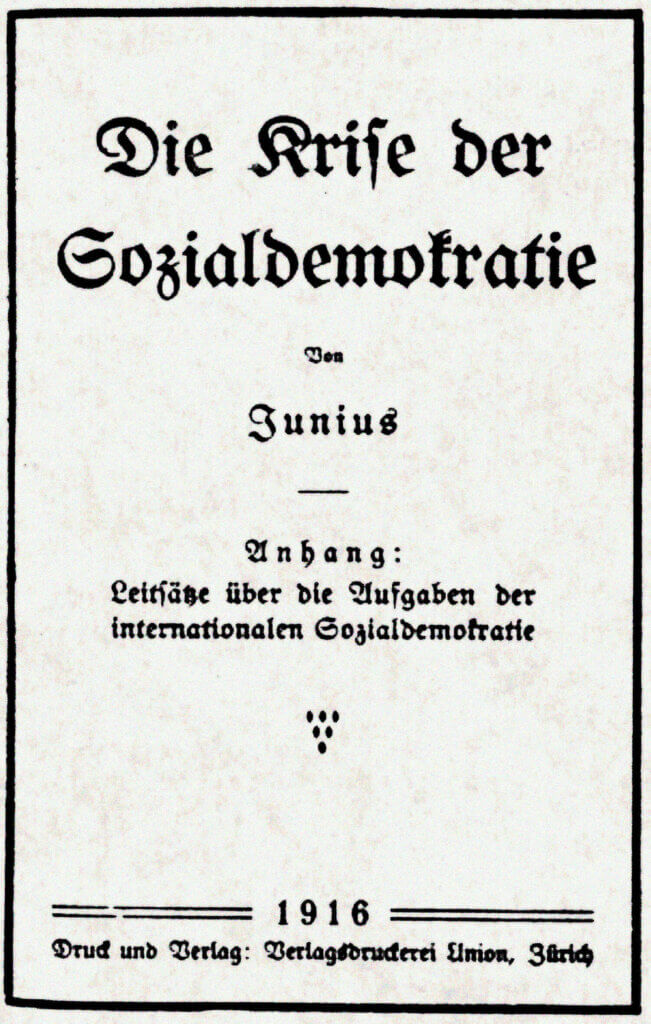
Cover of the Junius Pamphlet

The Junius Pamphlet (German: Juniusbroschüre) was a text written by Rosa Luxemburg in 1915, while she was in prison, against the brutality of the First World War. The actual title of the work was The Crisis of German Social Democracy (German: Die Krise der Sozialdemokratie), but she used the pen-name “Junius” to avoid prosecution, and this became the basis of the work's popular name. The name “Junius” was apparently a reference to Lucius Junius Brutus, a hero of the Roman Republic. The pseudonym also echoed a name used to sign political polemics against King George III of England, known as the Letters of Junius.

Luxemburg had the work smuggled out of prison and it was first published in 1916 in Zürich, Switzerland. Her critique of the collapse of the Second International in the face of world war proved influential among political activists looking for a way of reconstituting a revolutionary Marxist movement. Because it was published anonymously, some early editions mistakenly attributed authorship jointly to Rosa Luxemburg, Karl Liebknecht and Franz Mehring.

== Ideas ==
In the pamphlet, Luxemburg set out her views against the war as an imperialist and capitalist project, recorded her despair at the position of the Social Democratic Party of Germany, which supported Germany's involvement in the war, and called for revolution. It is one of her most famous works. Discussing the descent into war led by imperialist governments and bourgeois politicians, she famously wrote in the Junius Pamphlet that "bourgeois society stands at the crossroads, either transition to socialism or regression into barbarism."

The pamphlet also addressed the question of national rights. As a Marxist, Luxemburg was opposed to bourgeois nationalism, and in her 1908 work The National Question and Autonomy she had taken a firm line in favour of proletarian internationalism. However, in the Junius Pamphlet she argued that “international socialism recognises the right of free independent nations, with equal rights… between the national interests and the class interests of the proletariat, in war and peace, there is actually complete harmony.”

The pamphlet served as the guiding statement for the International Group, which later became the Spartacus League and, from 1919, the Communist Party of Germany.

== Criticism ==
In his reply to the pamphlet, written at a time when he was still unaware that Luxemburg was its author, Lenin opened with the remark that "on the whole, the Junius Pamphlet is a splendid Marxist work." However he went on to criticise it as failing to address opportunism as a general tendency in the Communist movement, meaning that while it articulated sound theoretical perspectives about the treachery of the right wing of the movement, it did not sufficiently address questions of party organisation. Lenin also took issue with Luxemburg's position on the national question. While her view on nationalism was somewhat more accommodating than it had been previously, Lenin was developing the idea of revolutionary nationalism as a force for liberation against imperialist domination.

== Later reception ==
Michael Löwy argued that the Junius Pamphlet marked a decisive change in Luxemburg's thinking. Previous to this her work indicated that her ideas were consistent with the predominant “fatalistic” or “mechanistic” ideas of mainstream German Social Democracy - in other words that the contradictions of capitalism would inevitably lead to its collapse and the advent of socialism. According to Löwy, the pamphlet was the first indication that Luxemburg's view had changed: socialism was not “inevitable” and could only be achieved through class struggle and political engagement.

However, Norman Geras disputed this view, pointing out that as early as 1900, in her work Social Reform or Revolution?, Luxemburg had argued that “it is not true that socialism will arise automatically from the daily struggle of the working class.” Geras held that Luxemburg's thought was consistent across all her work, and that the Junius Pamphlet did not in fact mark a turning point in her political philosophy.

== See also ==
- Socialism or Barbarism
- Socialisme ou Barbarie
