= Spartacist uprising =

1919 failed Communist takeover in Berlin, Germany

- Part of the German Revolution of 1918–1919
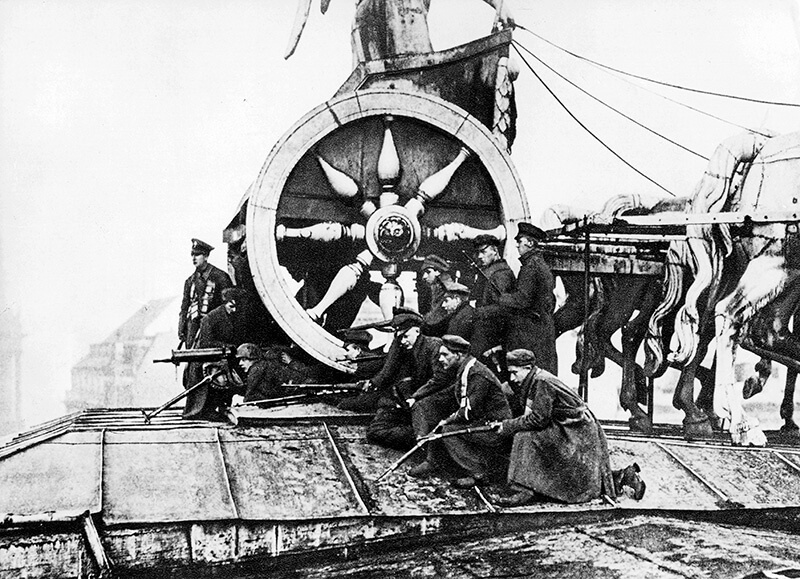
- Soldiers on the Brandenburg Gate during the Spartacist uprising
Date	5–12 January 1919
Location	Berlin, Germany
Result	Government victory

Belligerents
(Weimar Republic) Council of the People's Deputies: Freikorps	Communist Party of Germany: Spartacus League; Independent Social Democratic Party of Germany

Commanders and leaders
(Weimar Republic) Friedrich Ebert (Weimar Republic) Gustav Noske	Karl Liebknecht (executed); Rosa Luxemburg (executed)

Strength
3,000 Freikorps	

Casualties and losses
17 killed 20 wounded	130–180 killed
- 150–197 total deaths, including an uncertain number of civilians

The Spartacist uprising (German: Spartakusaufstand), also known as the January uprising (Januaraufstand) or, more rarely, Bloody Week, was an armed uprising that took place in Berlin from 5–12 January 1919. It occurred in connection with the German revolution that broke out just before the end of World War I. The uprising was primarily a power struggle between the supporters of the provisional government led by Friedrich Ebert of the Majority Social Democratic Party of Germany (MSPD), which favored a social democracy, and those who backed the position of the Communist Party of Germany (KPD) led by Karl Liebknecht and Rosa Luxemburg, which wanted to set up a council republic similar to the one established by the Bolsheviks in Russia. The government's forces were victorious in the fighting.

The death toll was roughly 150–200, mostly among the insurgents. The most prominent deaths were those of Liebknecht and Luxemburg, who were executed extrajudicially on 15 January, almost certainly with at least tacit approval of the MSPD-led government. The party's involvement hampered its position throughout the life of the Weimar Republic, although quashing the uprising allowed elections for the National Assembly to take place as scheduled on 19 January 1919. The Assembly went on to write the Weimar Constitution that created the first national German democracy.

The uprising took its popular name from the Marxist Spartacus League (Spartakusbund), which Luxemburg and Liebknecht founded in 1914. When the KPD was established on 1 January 1919, the Spartacus League became part of it. Some historians, such as Heinrich August Winkler and Sebastian Haffner, consider the name to be misleading because the Spartacists (KPD) had neither wanted, planned, nor led the revolt.

== Background and causes ==
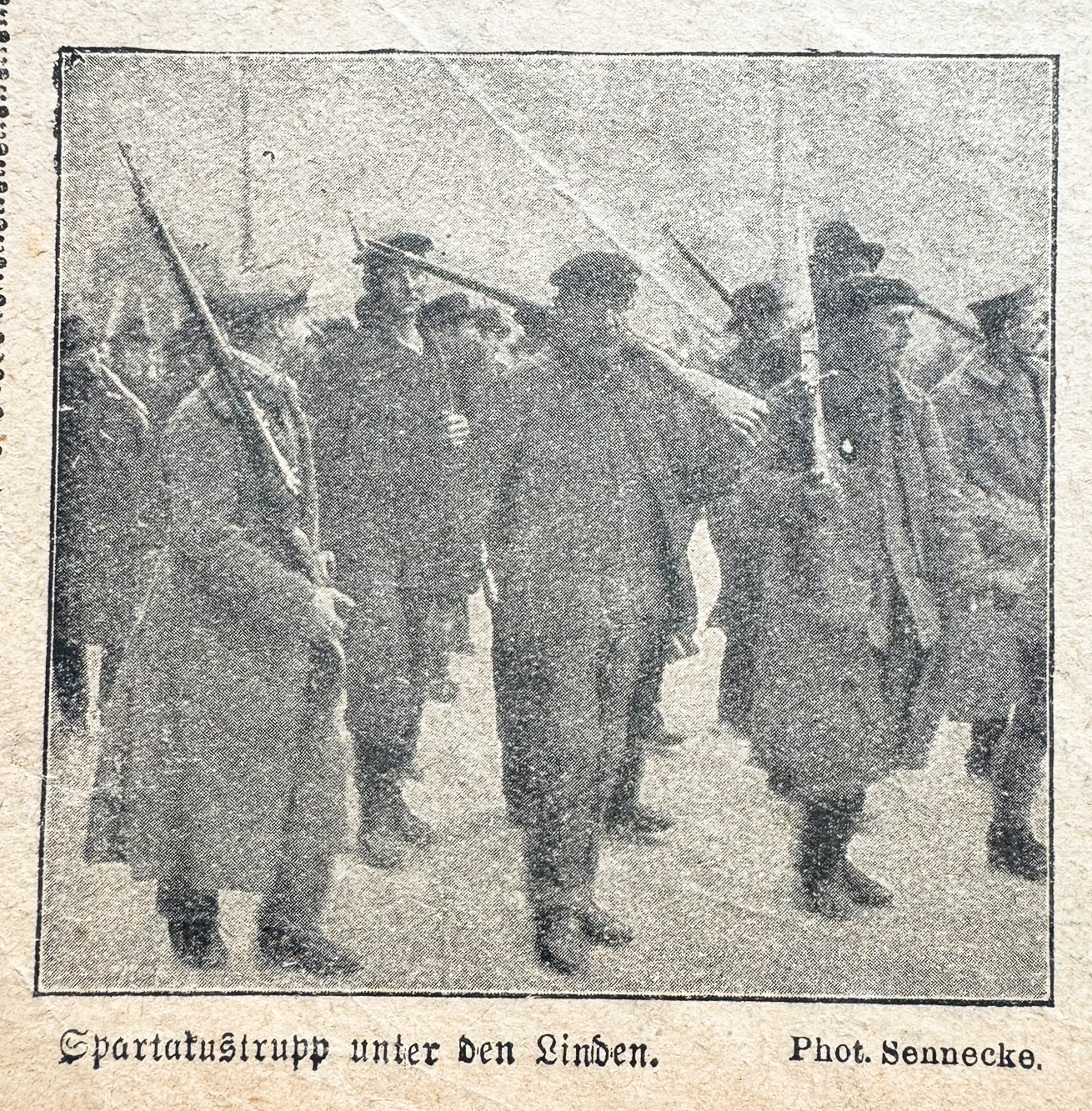
The Spartacus League in a show of force on Berlin's main thoroughfare, 18 December 1918

On 10 November 1918, the Council of the People's Deputies under the co-leadership of Friedrich Ebert of the Majority Social Democratic Party (MSPD) and Hugo Haase of the more left-wing Independent Social Democratic Party (USPD) was formed as a provisional government following the collapse of the German Empire at the end of World War I. It had three representatives each from the MSPD and USPD. The Supreme Army Command (OHL) implicitly recognized the council the same day in the secret Ebert-Groener Pact in which Wilhelm Groener, Quartermaster General of the German Army, assured Chancellor Ebert of the loyalty of the armed forces. In return, Ebert promised to take prompt action against leftist uprisings and leave military command with the officer corps. The MSPD leadership sought a rapid return to "orderly conditions" by means of elections to a national constituent assembly which would democratically determine Germany's future form of government. The USPD, the Revolutionary Stewards and parts of the working class wanted to continue working towards their revolutionary goals of nationalizing property, stripping power from the military and establishing a council republic.

On 1 January 1919, Rosa Luxemburg and Karl Liebknecht founded the Communist Party of Germany (KPD). Because of the unhappiness of many workers with the course of the November Revolution, other left-socialist groups joined in the party's foundation. The Revolutionary Stewards, however, after deliberations with the Spartacists, decided to remain in the USPD. Luxemburg presented her founding program on 31 December 1918. In it she noted that the Communists could never take power without the clear support of the majority of the people. On 1 January she again urged that the KPD participate in the planned elections for a constituent assembly, but she was outvoted. The majority hoped to gain power by continued agitation in the factories and pressure from the streets.

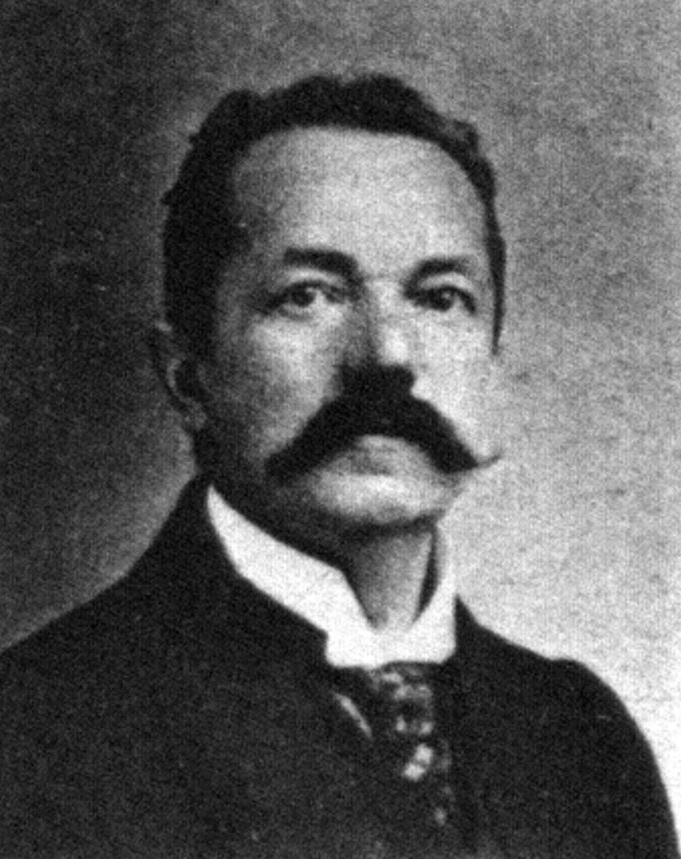
Emil Eichhorn

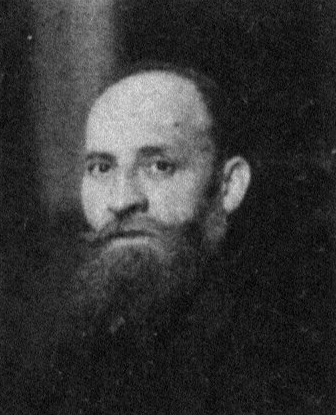
Eugen Ernst

On 23 December, a dispute arose over back pay owed to the People's Marine Division (Volksmarinedivision), which had been assigned to protect the provisional government in Berlin. In an attempt to force payment, the sailors took Otto Wels (MSPD), the military commander of Berlin, hostage. The following day, when the three MSPD members of the Council of the People's Deputies ordered Berlin's police chief, Emil Eichhorn (USPD), to use the security forces under his command to free Wels, he refused. Ebert then had the Army called in and ordered it to use deadly force against the People's Navy Division in what came to be known as the 1918 Christmas crisis. Wels was freed, but eleven men from the People's Marine Division and 56 from the Army were killed.

On 29 December, the three USPD representatives on the Council resigned in protest. The MSPD representatives then appointed two MSPD members to replace them. After that the USPD no longer saw the council as a legitimate interim government. MSPD majorities in the workers' councils agreed to Ebert's wish to dismiss Police Chief Eichhorn, whom he now considered unreliable, but the USPD and KPD interpreted Eichhorn's dismissal as an attack on the revolution. This became the immediate trigger of the uprising.

== Uprising ==
=== Mass demonstrations and general strike ===
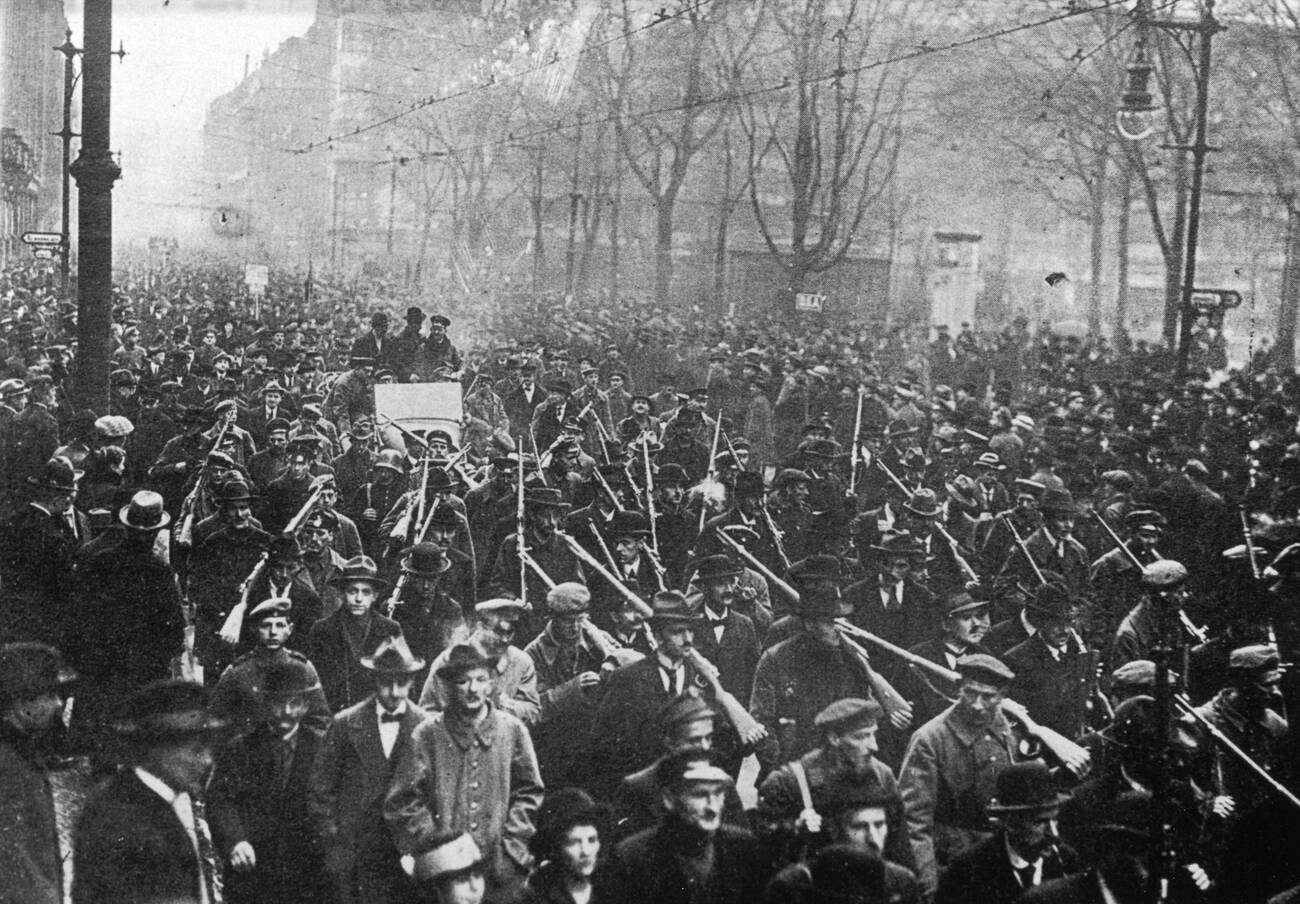
Armed workers on their way to occupy the newspaper district in Berlin, 5 January 1919

On 4 January, Eichhorn was dismissed and replaced by Eugen Ernst of the MSPD. Despite their differences, the Revolutionary Stewards and the executive committee of the Berlin USPD resolved to hold a demonstration the next day. The 5 January protest exceeded expectations of scale and turnout; in total, there were 100,000 participants in the demonstrations and related strikes. Over the course of the next seven days, armed demonstrators occupied the printing plants of the Social Democratic newspaper Vorwärts and the Berliner Tageblatt, as well as several publishing houses' buildings, a printing plant and a telegraph office.

The leading members of the Revolutionary Stewards, the USPD and the KPD met on the evening of 5 January to decide how to proceed. Most of those present supported the occupation of the Berlin newspaper district and were in favor of taking up the fight against the Social Democratic government. Liebknecht had been "whipped into a state of revolutionary euphoria" by the size of the demonstration and the false report that all regiments in and around Berlin were on their side, whereas Luxemburg continued to oppose these actions. Only two spokesmen for the Revolutionary Stewards, Richard Müller and Ernst Däumig, spoke out against the course of action. While both in principle supported a second revolution against the Council of People's Deputies, they considered the timing premature and tactically unwise; they voted only for a general strike. A provisional revolutionary committee to overthrow the government and take power was decided on by about 70 of those present against 6 no votes from the ranks of the Revolutionary Stewards. The committee was formed of 53 people, with Georg Ledebour, Liebknecht and Paul Scholze the three co-equal chairmen.

The following day, the Revolutionary Committee called on the workers of Berlin to stage a general strike on 7 January and overthrow Ebert's government. The call was answered by up to 500,000 people who poured into the city center. They did not take part in any fighting in the days that followed, nor were they joined by the strike leaders, although they were ready to disarm the soldiers, as they had been on 9 November. Some of their placards and banners bore the same slogans as at the beginning of the November Revolution: "Peace and Unity", but there were also fliers such as the one issued by the "revolutionary workforce of Greater Berlin":

Workers! Comrades! Soldiers! The hour has come when the revolution must be brought to a victorious end. Either we establish the dictatorship of the proletariat or we will see Ebert – Scheidemann, the executioners of the revolution, strangle it to death. ... Workers! Comrades! Soldiers! Take power into your hands. Overthrow the government, which places itself protectively before the coffers, which has betrayed and only betrayed the revolution. Long live the dictatorship of the proletariat! Long live the revolution!

=== Division among leadership ===
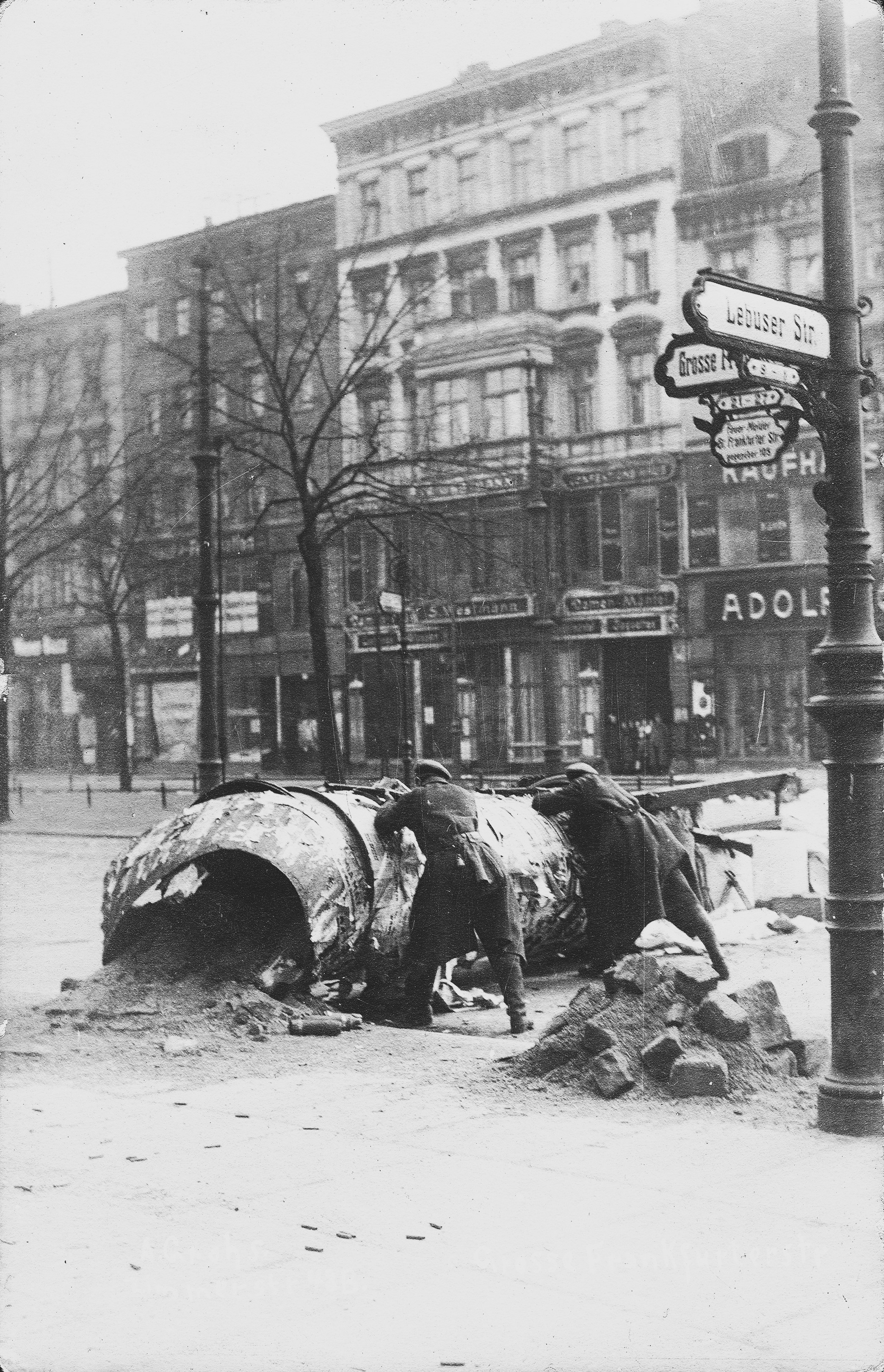
Combatants take cover behind a barricade during the uprising

Over the next two days, the Revolutionary Committee could not agree on how to proceed. Some representatives called for armed insurrection while others pleaded for negotiations with Ebert. The committee was in particular unable to signal to the hundreds of thousands of demonstrators who were waiting for direction in the streets and squares what they should do. Because of that they went home again on the evenings of both 5 and 6 January without having accomplished anything.

KPD leader Liebknecht, initially against the advice of Luxemburg, supported the plan to unleash a civil war. The Council of People's Deputies was to be overthrown by force of arms and the elections to the National Assembly scheduled for 19 January prevented. Liebknecht feared that the KPD might otherwise isolate itself too much from the workers who sought the overthrow of the government. At the same time, KPD members tried to win over to their side some of the regiments stationed in Berlin, especially the People's Marine Division. They did not succeed, since most of the soldiers were already at home, either because they had declared themselves neutral or their loyalty was to the Council of People's Deputies. In addition, a part of Berlin's citizens, especially the middle class, rallied behind Ebert's government, heeding its call to strike and to act as living shields to secure government buildings.

On 6 January the Revolutionary Committee began negotiating with Ebert through the mediation of USPD leadership. The negotiations failed on 7 January due to the unwillingness of either side to compromise. The Council of People's Deputies demanded the evacuation of the occupied newspaper buildings, while the insurgents insisted on Eichhorn's reinstatement. The chance for a nonviolent settlement of the conflict was thus lost.

=== Government response ===
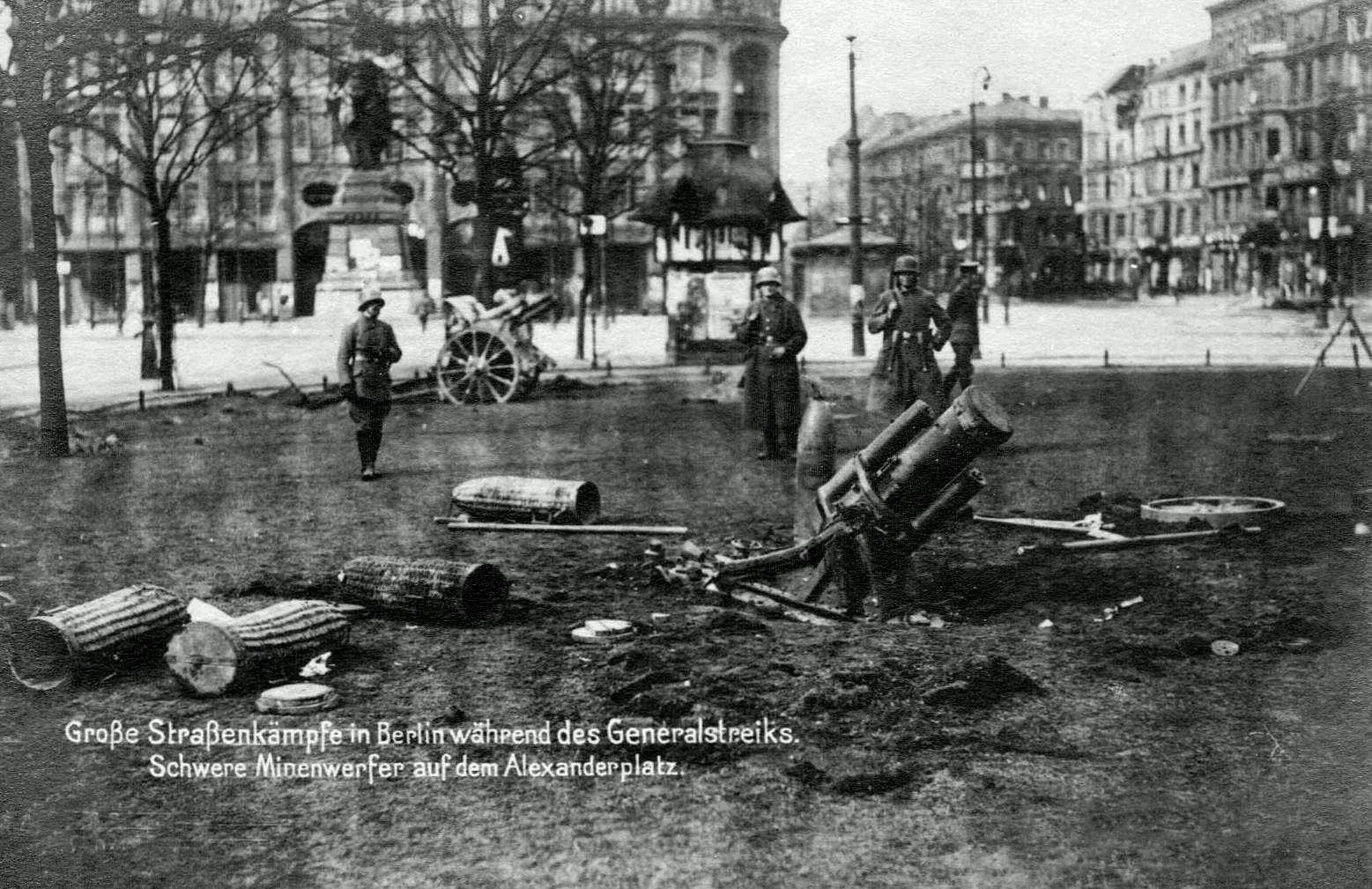
German troops with a heavy mortar during the uprising

On the same day, Ebert gave Gustav Noske (MSPD) command of the troops in and around Berlin, and calls went out for the formation of more Freikorps units. Since early December 1918, such Freikorps units had been forming from former frontline soldiers and volunteers. Now Ebert and Noske allowed them to muster around Berlin with organizations loyal to the Republic and with imperial regiments, some loyal but most hostile to the Republic. Immediately after Noske's appointment, he ordered that all members of the Revolutionary Committee be monitored so that they could be arrested later. To this end, 50 officers were posted in all Berlin post offices.

On 8 January the Council of People's Deputies called on the population to resist the insurgents and their intended takeover of the government and published a leaflet in which they announced they would meet violence with violence:

Spartacus fights for all the power. The government, which wants to bring about the people's free decision on their own fate within ten days, is to be overthrown by force. The people will not be allowed to speak, their voice will be suppressed. You have seen the results! Where Spartacus rules, all personal freedom and security is cancelled. The press is suppressed, traffic is paralysed. Parts of Berlin are the scene of bloody battles. ... Violence can only be fought with violence. The organised violence of the people will put an end to oppression and anarchy. ... The hour of reckoning is approaching!

On 9 January the central executive committee of the Berlin USPD and the KPD issued a joint appeal demanding a fight against "the Judases in the government. ... They belong in the penitentiary, on the scaffold. ... Use weapons against your mortal enemies."

The mass of the working class followed the call for a general strike to prevent a counterrevolution, but it did not want to have anything to do with military struggles. On the contrary, they continued to demand the unity of the socialist forces and, at a large meeting in the Humboldthain Park on 9 January, demanded the resignation of all the leaders responsible for the "fratricide". Both the Ebert government and Ledebour and Liebknecht were seen as responsible for the situation. Numerous resolutions from the factories called for an end to the street fighting and the creation of a government in which all socialist parties would be represented. In the view of historian Sebastian Haffner, the executive committee of the Berlin USPD and KPD had failed the uprising, which was "entirely the spontaneous work of the masses of Berlin workers who had made the November Revolution; the masses were overwhelmingly Social Democrats, not Spartacists or Communists, and their January uprising was no different than their November revolution had been."

=== Suppression ===
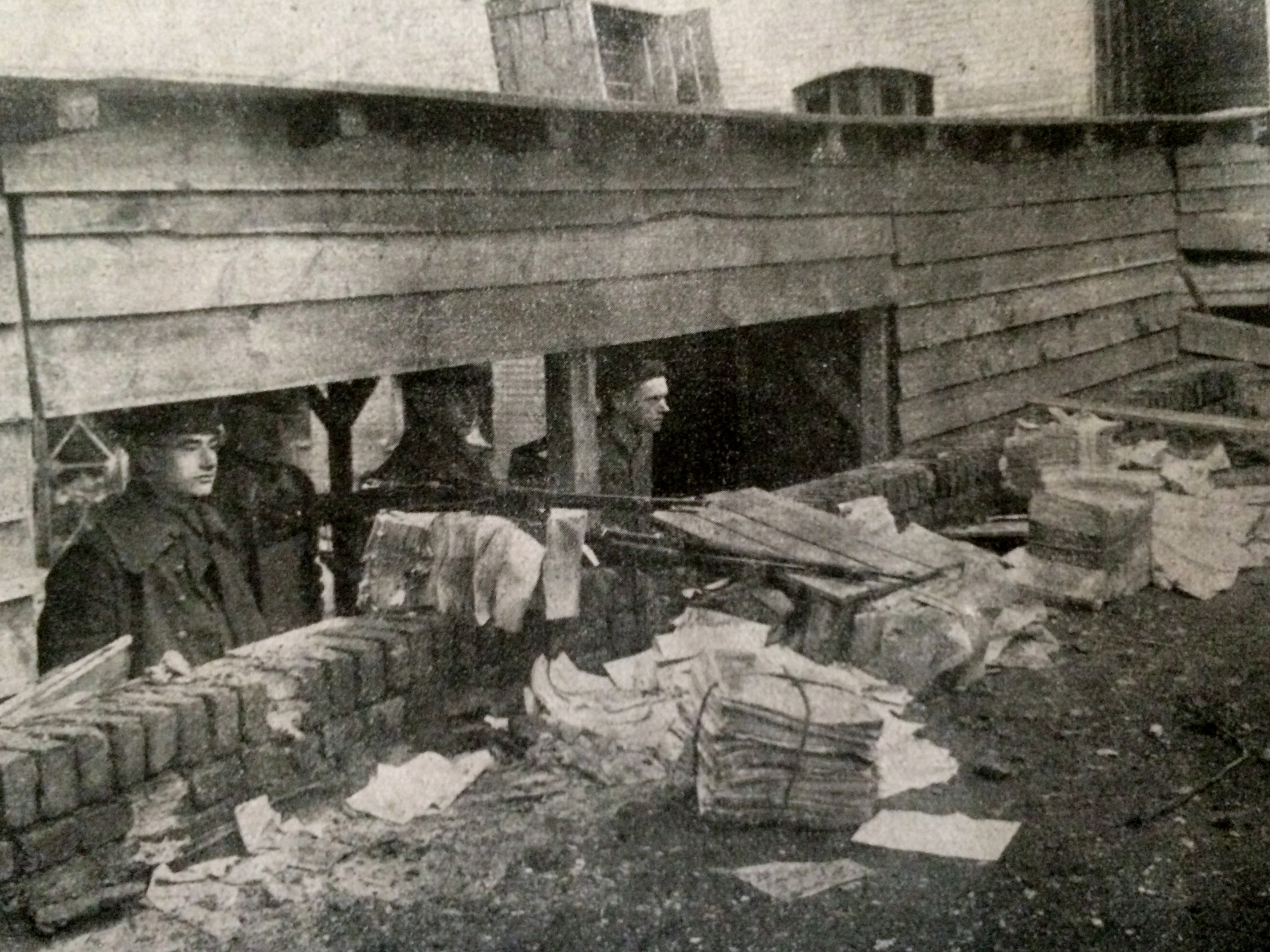
Government troops in the Vorwärts building

On 10 January the Freikorps Reinhard Brigade, led by Colonel Wilhelm Reinhard, attacked the Spartacist headquarters in Spandau. On 11 January Noske gave the order for action against those occupying the Vorwärts newspaper building. The attackers, armed with military weapons, far outgunned their opponents. The Potsdam Freikorps captured the building with flame throwers, machine guns, mortars and artillery. Other occupied buildings and streets in the newspaper district were also taken over by 12 January.

There were no organized battles because the insurgents were not prepared for them; in many cases they surrendered voluntarily. The military nevertheless shot over a hundred insurgents and an unknown number of uninvolved civilians in the area. On 11 January, for example, seven men who wanted to negotiate with the government troops for a surrender of the Vorwärts building were taken to the Berlin Dragoon Barracks and shot. An investigative committee of the parliament of Prussia later put the overall death toll at 156. Among the military there were thirteen killed and twenty wounded.

On 13 January Freikorps units from the area around Berlin moved into the city, as did the Guards Cavalry Rifle Division, a unit of the soon to be dissolved Prussian Army under Captain Waldemar Pabst. Berlin newspapers hailed the troops' entry at the end of the fighting as the restoration of "peace and order". The military occupation was followed by many instances of violence committed by right-wing troops, far exceeding previous acts of violence by some from the left.

== Murders of Rosa Luxemburg and Karl Liebknecht ==
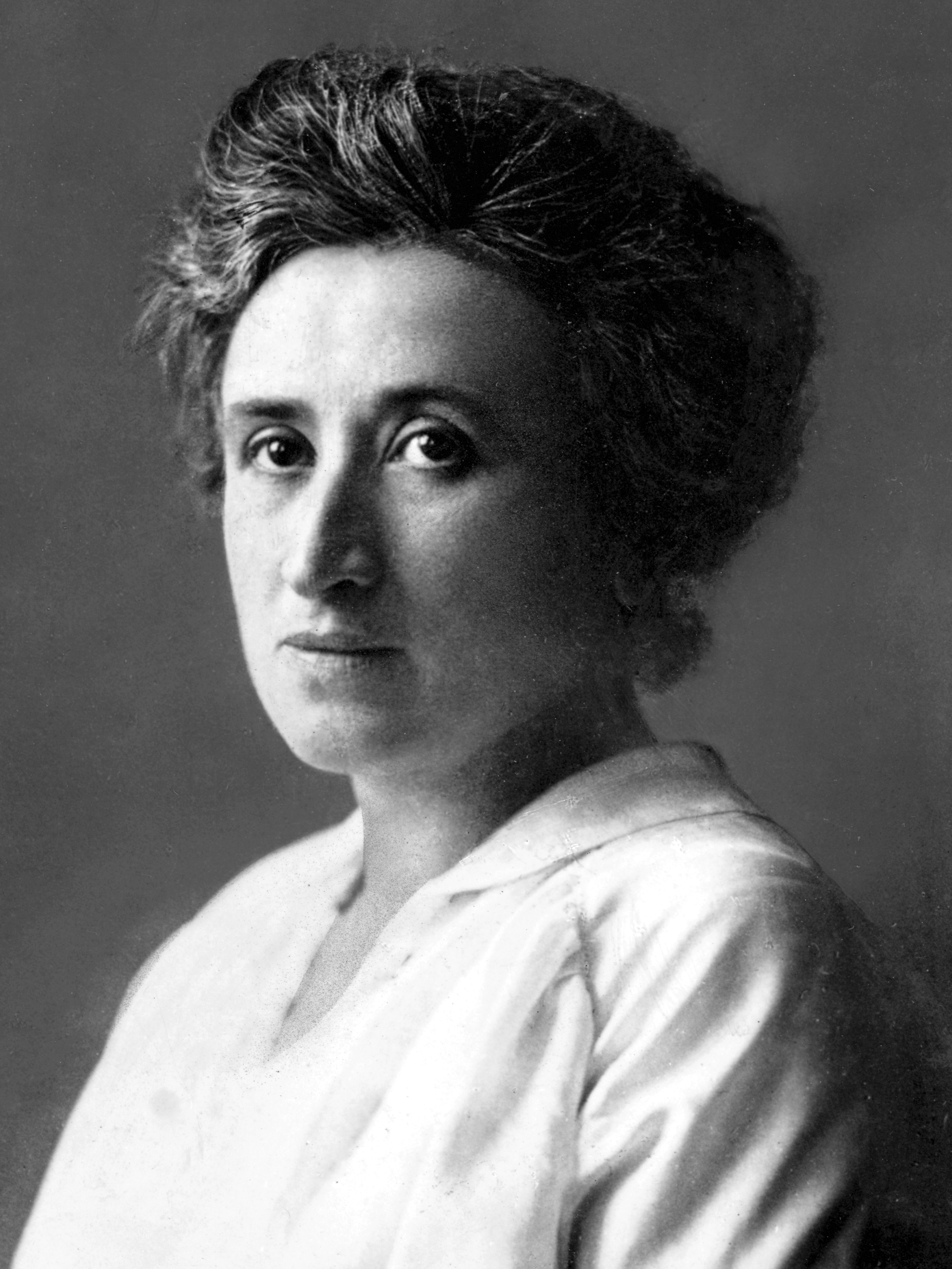
Rosa Luxemburg

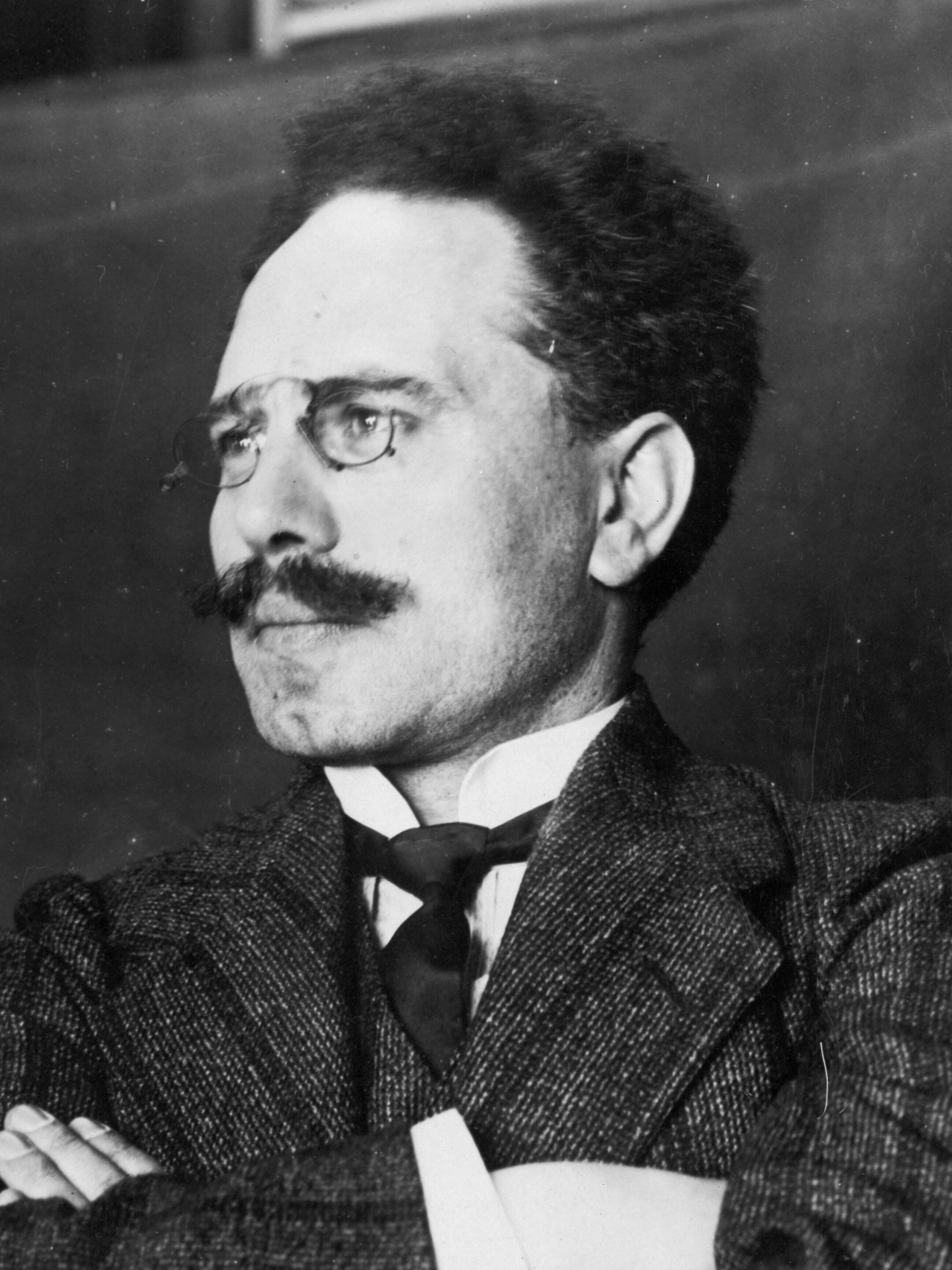
Karl Liebknecht

Right-wing groups had been agitating against German Communists and their leaders even before the January uprising. The Anti-Bolshevist League printed posters and appeals to the population of Berlin calling for the Bolshevik ringleaders to be found and handed over to the military. A high reward was offered. One leaflet that circulated in large numbers proclaimed:

The Fatherland is close to ruin. Save it! It is not threatened from outside, but from within: from the Spartacus League. Strike their leaders dead! Kill Liebknecht! Then you will have peace, work and bread. –The frontline soldiers.

After the uprising was crushed, the Spartacist leaders feared for their lives and went into hiding. The government sought them out as alleged putschists in order to prosecute them for the attempted coup before the 19 January elections. Fritz Henck, Philipp Scheidemann's son-in-law, publicly assured the residents of Berlin on 14 January that the leaders of the uprising "would not get off scot-free". In just a few days, he said, it would become clear "that things will get serious for them, too".

On the evening of 15 January, Luxemburg and Liebknecht were found in the apartment of a friend, Dr. Markussohn, in Berlin-Wilmersdorf by the Wilmersdorf Citizens' Militia, arrested and taken to the Eden Hotel. Their whereabouts had probably become known through the telephone surveillance that Noske had ordered. Waldemar Pabst had the prisoners interrogated and physically abused over a period of hours. KPD leader Wilhelm Pieck, who was also arrested when he visited the apartment that evening, witnessed the abuse as well as a number of telephone calls.

The murders of Luxemburg and Liebknecht were intended to look like an assassination. Private Otto Runge hit Luxemburg with his rifle butt as she was being led out of the hotel. She was pushed unconscious into a waiting car then shot in the temple by Freikorps Lieutenant Hermann Souchon. Her body was thrown into the Berlin Landwehr Canal by First Lieutenant Kurt Vogel. It was not found until 31 May.

Liebknecht was taken from the hotel shortly after Luxemburg and after getting into a waiting car was knocked almost unconscious, again by Otto Runge. The car stopped in the Berlin Tiergarten, Liebknecht was forced out then shot in the back as a "fugitive". His body was handed over to a Berlin police station as the "corpse of an unknown man".

KPD leader Wilhelm Pieck was able to obtain an order to have himself transferred to a prison and escaped en route.

=== Reactions ===
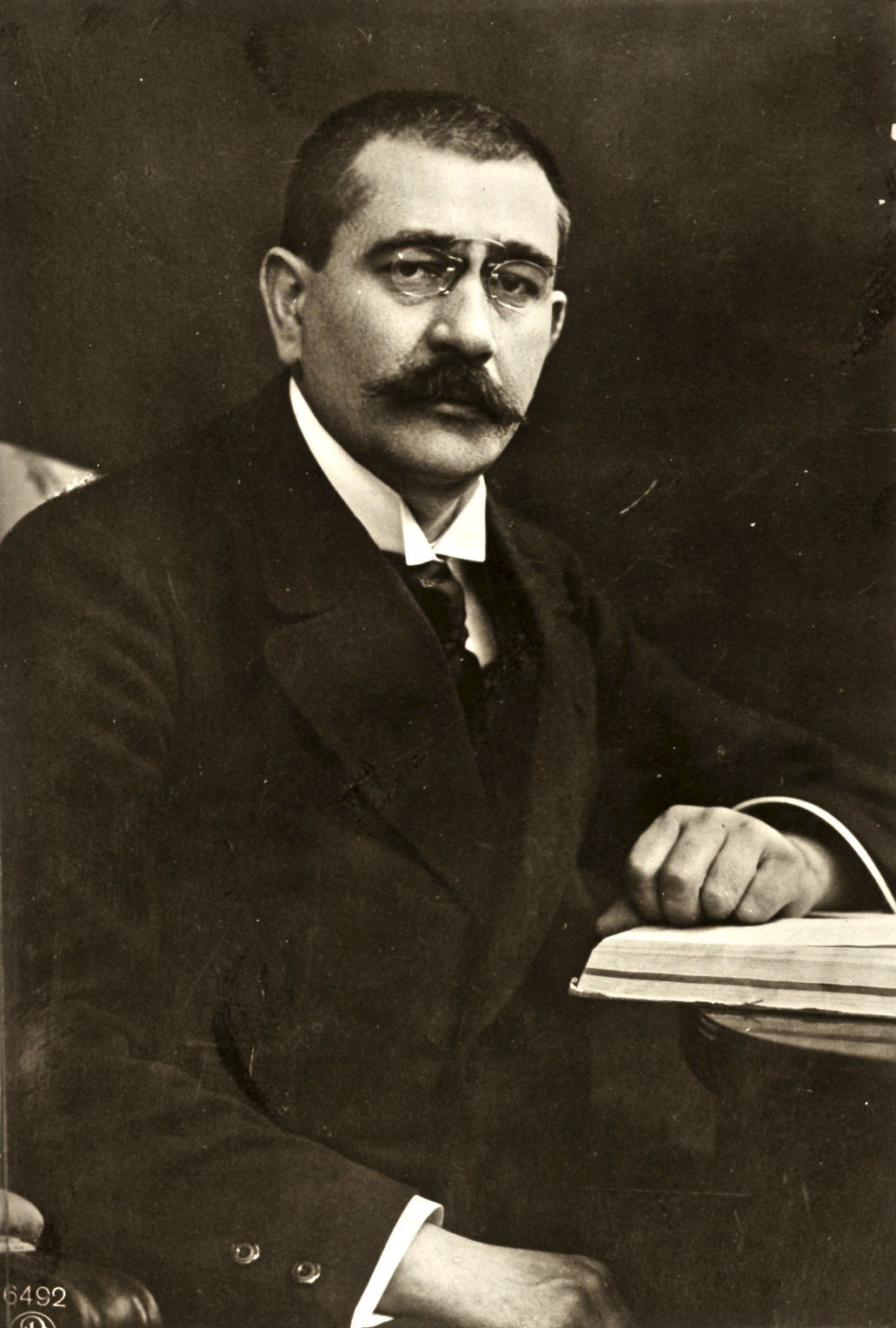
Gustav Noske

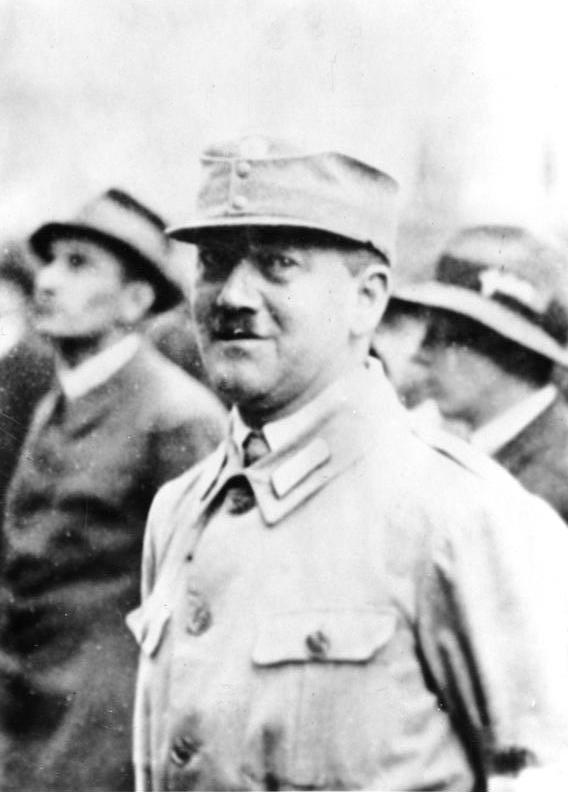
Waldemar Pabst

On 16 January the Berlin press reported that Liebknecht had been shot while fleeing authorities and Luxemburg lynched by an angry crowd. The basis for the account was a document that Pabst had written on the evening of the murders and had published as an official report from his division. After knowledge of the murders became public, the government called a special meeting at which Ebert is said to have expressed his shock at the murders of the former SPD party comrades he had known for decades. MSPD representatives feared an expansion of the uprisings as a result of the murders. Some briefly considered resigning. Noske, on the other hand, in a 1923 retrospect described the people who had been murdered as the main culprits in the revolution's degeneration into civil war. Thousands had asked beforehand "if no one would render the troublemakers harmless".

Leo Jogiches, Luxemburg's former companion, took over the leadership of the KPD after her death and tried to shed light on the murders. In an article in the party's Die Rote Fahne (The Red Flag) newspaper on 12 February 1919, he revealed the names of some of those his own research led him to suspect of being involved. He was arrested in March 1919 during additional Freikorps operations against left-wing workers' leaders and murdered in prison.

=== Legal proceedings ===
Criminal proceedings against alleged perpetrators were not instigated right away. On 16 February 1919, KPD members began demanding an independent investigation by a non-military special court because they feared suppression of evidence. It was not until May 1919 that some of the perpetrators – including Otto Runge and Kurt Vogel – were brought before a military field court of their own division. The main trial took place from 8 to 14 May 1919. There was repeated testimony that a "ministry aiding the MSPD" had offered a bounty of 100,000 marks for the capture of the Spartacus leaders. Wilhelm Pieck was one of the most important witnesses of the incidents at the hotel that led up to the murders. He and a number of employees of the hotel had been aware of the mistreatment that took place before the murders and overheard telephone calls between officers and their superiors. Pieck testified that he saw "an officer, addressed by the others as 'captain' walking around offering cigarettes to the soldiers and saying, 'The gang must not leave the Eden Hotel alive!' ... A short time after that, a maid came up, fell into the arms of a colleague, and exclaimed, 'I'll never be free of the image of that poor woman being knocked down and dragged around.'"

Runge received two years in prison, Vogel 28 months. The officers involved, the brothers Heinz and Horst von Pflugk-Harttung, were acquitted. Their commander Pabst was not charged, and others who had possibly given orders were not sought out. As commander-in-chief of the armed forces, Noske personally confirmed the verdicts with his signature.

Vogel was taken out of Moabit Prison on 17 May, three days after the sentencing, by a Lieutenant Lindemann for transfer to Tegel Prison. Lindemann was in fact Captain Lieutenant (and later Admiral) Wilhelm Canaris, who took Vogel to the Netherlands by car. Canaris was never prosecuted for the action.

Representatives of the KPD and USPD, along with some from the MSPD and the liberals, regarded the military trial and verdicts as a judicial scandal. Attempts to challenge the verdict and reopen the trial in a higher court were put off. All the remaining members of the Revolutionary Committee were imprisoned but later released for lack of evidence showing that they were planning an armed coup. It was not until 1929 that Paul Jorns, who had been the military judge in the trial, was dismissed for bias.

=== Post-Weimar ===
In 1934, the Nazi regime granted Runge compensation for his imprisonment and Vogel convalescence using taxpayers' money. In January 1935, the National Socialists leveled the graves of Luxemburg and Liebknecht, possibly also disposing of their bones.

Runge, recognized and beaten by workers in 1925 and 1931 after his release from prison, was tracked down by members of the KPD in Berlin in May 1945 and handed over to the Soviet commandant's office on the instructions of senior prosecutor Max Berger. Runge was charged with murder, although his health later deteriorated, and he died in custody in September 1945.

The journalist and right-wing politician Eduard Stadtler stated in his 1935 memoirs that the murders were contract killings. He wrote that on a visit to Pabst on 12 January he had "requested the murders from him" and that Pabst told him later who had carried them out. Pabst also indicated that he had been in contact with Noske.

In 1959 Pabst had a conversation with Günther Nollau, later vice president of the German Federal Office for the Protection of the Constitution, who recorded what Pabst said: "During that time, he [Pabst] had heard Karl Liebknecht and Rosa Luxemburg speak in Berlin. Wearing civilian clothes, he mingled with the crowd. His observations led him to the conclusion that the two were extraordinarily dangerous and that there was no one on their side to counter them. He therefore decided to get rid of them." In 1962 Pabst stated in an interview with Der Spiegel that Noske had permitted the murders and afterwards covered up the lack of prosecutions. In 1970 a letter was found in Pabst's estate in which he wrote: "It is clear that I could not have carried out the action without Noske's approval – with Ebert in the background – and that I also had to protect my officers. But very few people have understood why I was never questioned or brought up on charges. As a man of honor, I responded to the behavior of the MSPD by keeping my mouth shut for 50 years about our cooperation."

Noske always denied the conversation overheard by Pabst in which he was said to have made an agreement to cooperate in the arrest and murder of the Spartacists. Otto Kranzbühler, who later became the lawyer for Hermann Souchon, the man who shot Luxemburg, stated that Pabst had confirmed to him the telephone conversation with Noske. Biographers also believe that Pabst probably consulted with Noske or Hans von Seeckt of the army command.

== Consequences ==
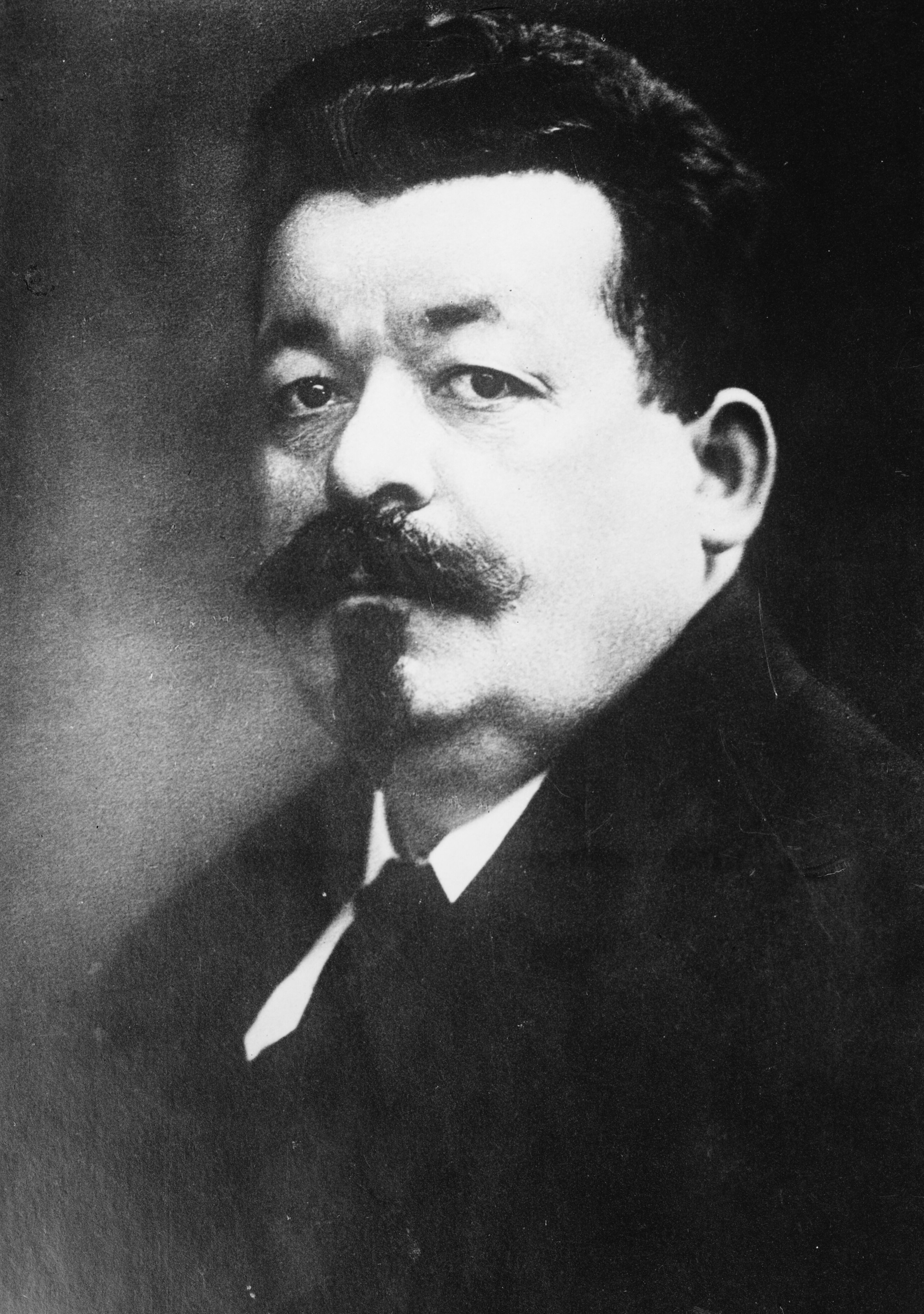
Friedrich Ebert

The uprising did not have a mass base and was, according to historian Heinrich August Winkler, only an "attempted coup by a radical minority". Its rapid suppression therefore was no surprise. It was probably also inevitable, since without it, the result would probably have been a civil war throughout Germany and military intervention by the victorious powers. After the uprising was quashed, Ebert could continue on the path towards establishing a parliament. On 19 January 1919 elections for the National Assembly were held. The Assembly finalized the Weimar Constitution on 11 August and created the first national German democracy, the Weimar Republic.

The bloody suppression of the uprising left the MSPD under a heavy burden. In the elections to the National Assembly, it received 37.9 percent of the vote, while the USPD received 7.6 percent, with the result that the two already hostile left-wing parties did not obtain an absolute majority. In the subsequent elections during the life of the Weimar Republic, the SPD never again achieved more than 30 percent of the vote and thus remained dependent on coalitions with the middle-class parties of the center in order to participate in government, even after its reunification with most of the USPD in 1922.

== Remembrances ==
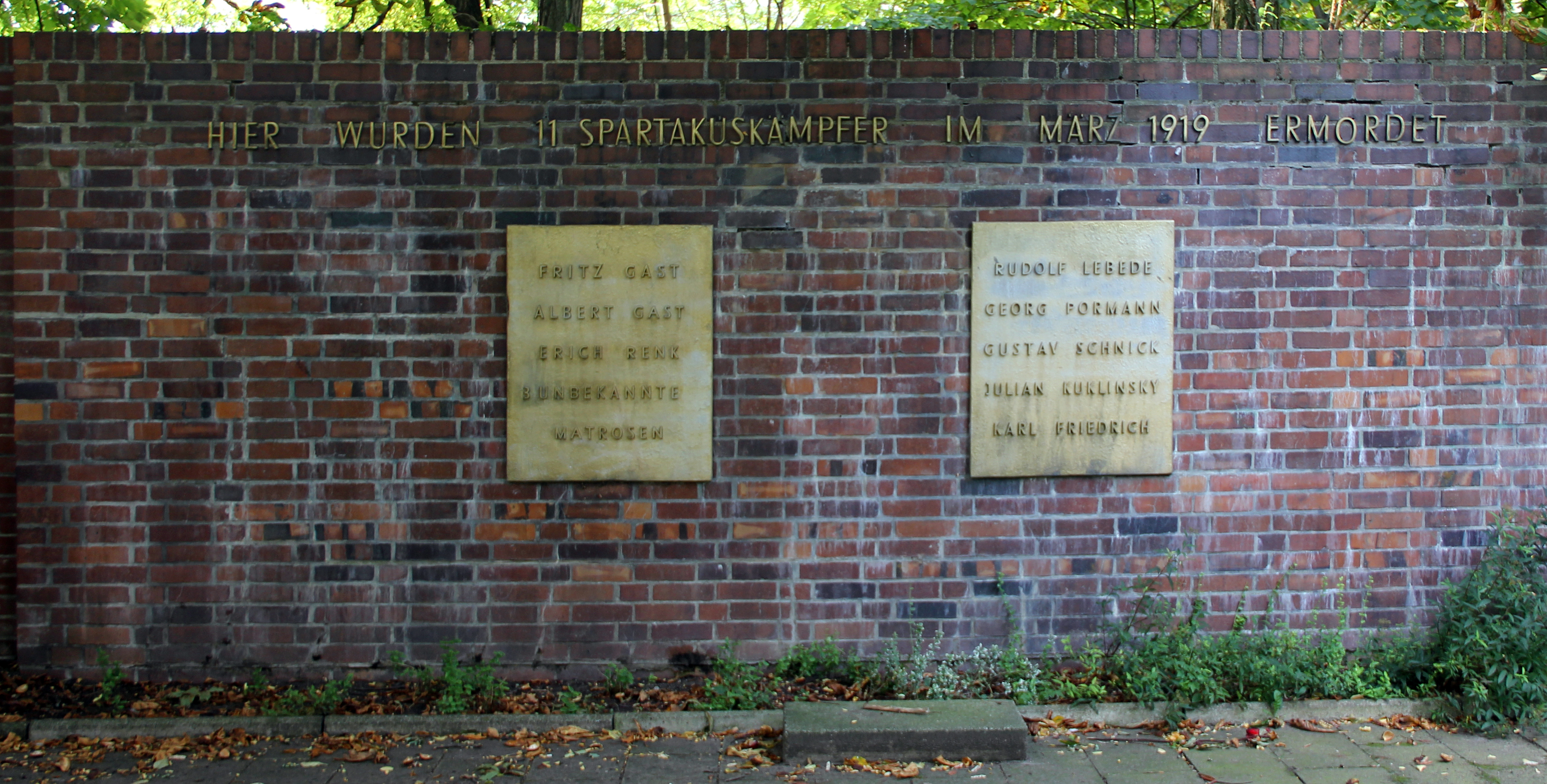
Memorial plaques for the fighters who died in the uprising

Every year on the second weekend of January, the Liebknecht-Luxemburg demonstration takes place in Berlin to commemorate Karl Liebknecht and Rosa Luxemburg. It ends at the Socialists' Memorial in the Friedrichsfelde Central Cemetery.

== Evaluation ==
In the historiography of the former German Democratic Republic (East Germany), the uprising was judged very positively. Its view was that only the KPD had succeeded in forming a Marxist–Leninist fighting party and created a crucial prerequisite for the victory of the proletarian revolution; in this respect, the KPD's foundation was one of the decisive turning points in the history of the German workers' movement. This interpretation exaggerated the strength of the Spartacus League and its influence and glossed over its failed tactics. Since the 1990 German reunification, historical scholarship has evaluated the uprising predominantly negatively. Hans Mommsen labeled the insurgents' actions a "terrorist coup tactic". Hagen Schulze wrote that their goal was a "socialist, red revolution and a dictatorship of the working class". Heinrich August Winkler sees the January uprising as an "insurrection against democracy". Much like the 1917 October Revolution by Vladimir Lenin and the Bolsheviks, who subsequently used force of arms to disperse the democratically elected Russian Constituent Assembly in January 1918, Liebknecht and his followers wanted to prevent formation of a republican and parliamentary system even before the elections to the National Assembly. Historian Henning Köhler characterizes the uprising as "blind action", a "struggle for power … corresponding to the Bolshevik model". Hans-Ulrich Wehler was of the opinion that the KPD, against Luxemburg's advice, "gave in to a putschist current that sought to unleash a German civil war by means of the Berlin January uprising". Sönke Neitzel calls the uprising a "spontaneous, leaderless action". Irish historian Mark Jones makes a similar judgment, characterizing the uprising as an "improvised coup attempt with very little real chance of success".

== Sources ==
- Bassler, Gerhard P. (1973). "The Communist Movement In The German Revolution, 1918–1919: A Problem Of Historical Typology?". Central European History. 6 (3): 233–277. doi:10.1017/s000893890001623x. S2CID 145316611.
- Haffner, Sebastian (1973) [1968]. Failure of a revolution: Germany, 1918–19. New York: Library Press. ISBN 9780912050232.
- Jones, Mark (2016). Founding Weimar: Violence and the German Revolution of 1918–1919. Cambridge: Cambridge University Press. ISBN 978-1-107-11512-5 – via Google Books.
- Waldman, Eric (1958). The Spartacist Uprising of 1919 and the Crisis of the German Socialist Movement: A Study of the Relation of Political Theory and Party Practice. Milwaukee: Marquette University Press – via Google Books.
