= Kurt Vogel =

Kurt Vogel may refer to:

- Kurt Vogel (historian) (1888-1985), German historian of mathematics and science
- Kurt Vogel (German officer) (1889-1967), German military officer
