= Kurt Vogel (German officer) =

German officer, involved in murder of Rosa Luxemburg

Kurt Vogel (11 October 1889 – 1967) was a German officer in World War I and member of the Prussian Army unit Guards Cavalry Rifle Division (Garde-Kavallerie-Schützen-Division). He was involved in the murder of the revolutionary socialist Rosa Luxemburg, although according to the most current research he was not the one who shot her.

== Early career ==
Vogel served as an aviation officer in World War I. He was discharged as a first lieutenant at the end of the war and joined a Freikorps unit operating in Berlin that was subordinate to the Guards Cavalry Rifle Division under the command of Lieutenant General Heinrich von Hofmann.

== Murder of Rosa Luxemburg ==
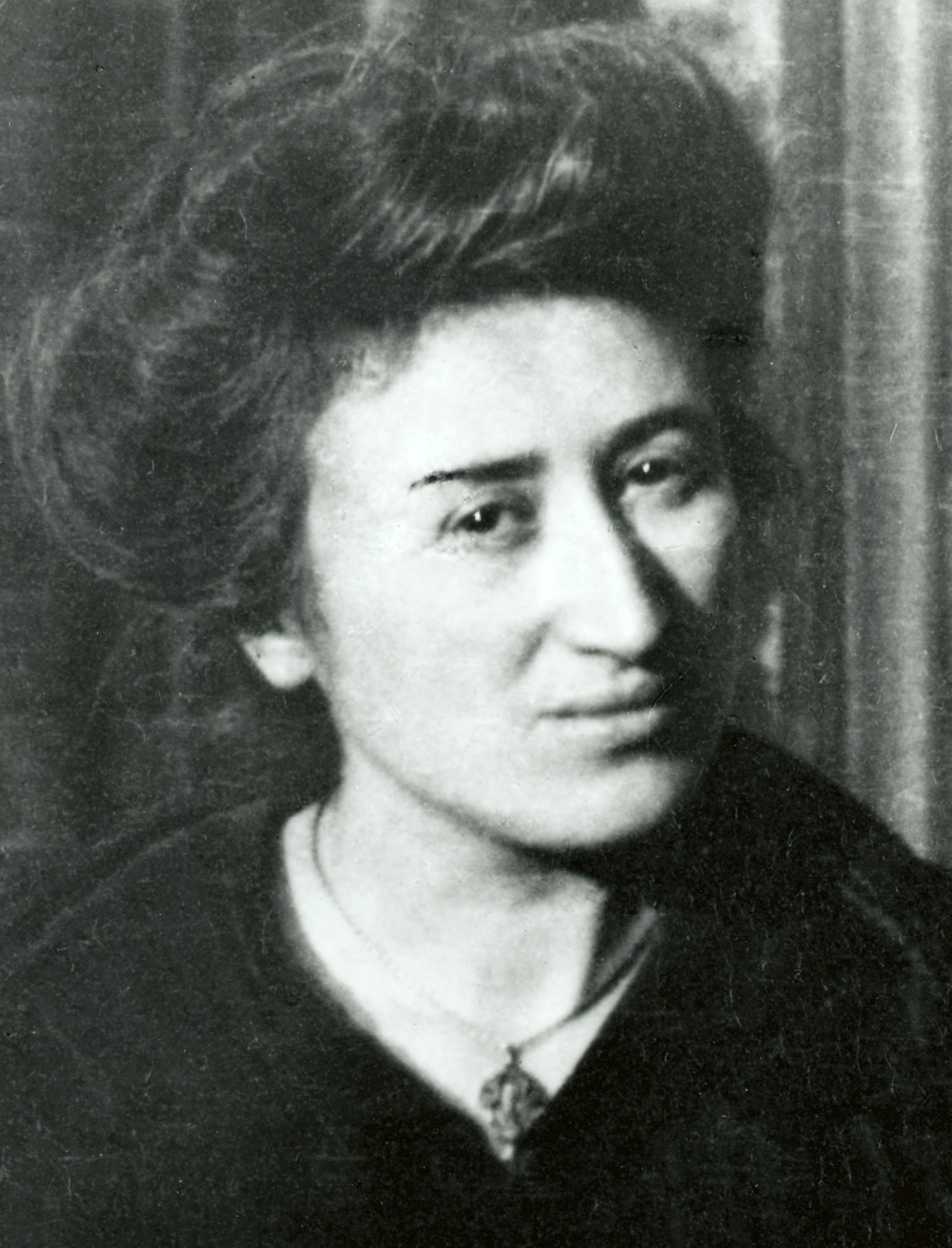
Rosa Luxemburg

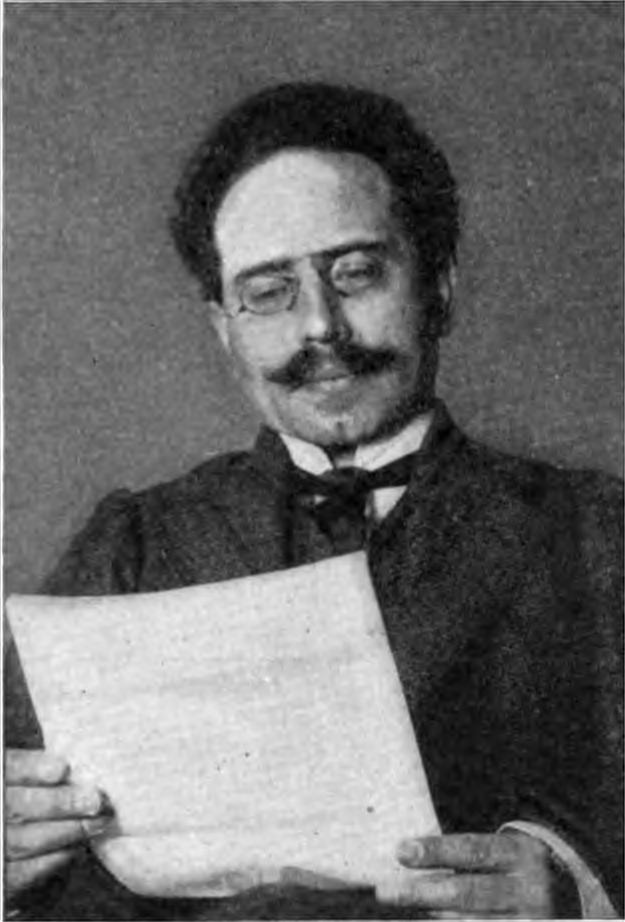
Karl Liebknecht

On 15 January 1919, Communist Party of Germany (KPD) leaders Rosa Luxemburg and Karl Liebknecht were arrested in Berlin-Wilmersdorf where they had gone into hiding following the Spartacist uprising, a failed attempt to overthrow the new German government. At the Guard Cavalry Rifle Division's headquarters in the Eden Hotel, they were interrogated and severely maltreated by members of the unit under the command of Lead General Staff Officer Captain Waldemar Pabst. As Luxemburg was led out of the hotel, Private Otto Wilhelm Runge struck her on the head with the butt of a rifle, seriously injuring her. While being taken away by car, she was shot and her body then dumped into the Landwehr Canal. For many years it was believed that Kurt Vogel, acting as transport leader, was the man who killed her. Only in 1959, when Waldemar Pabst revealed his part in ordering the murders of Luxemburg and Liebknecht, did it become known that naval officer Hermann Souchon had jumped onto the car as it left the hotel and shot her.

== Trial ==
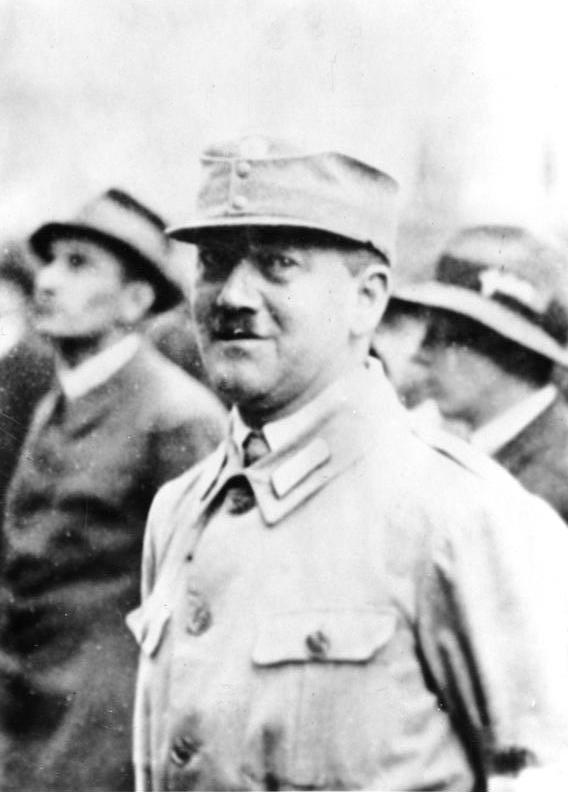
Waldemar Pabst

On 17 January 1919, at a field court-martial under the Guard Cavalry Rifle Division, court-martial councilor Paul Jorns began proceedings in the Luxemburg and Liebknecht murder cases. General Hofmann, the division's military judge, had previously removed another court-martial councilor whose desire for objectivity had been attested to by the Social Democrat Hugo Haase. Criminal proceedings against the alleged perpetrators initially stalled when Jorns released Kurt Vogel and Captain Lieutenant Horst von Pflugk-Harttung, who had been ordered by Pabst to have the murders carried out.

Because members of the KPD feared that there had been collusion in the acquittals, they began on 16 February 1919 to demand an independent investigation by a non-military special court. Hofmann and Jorns were thus forced to call on four members of Germany's socialist government to help carry out the investigation. Jorns himself refused to respond to requests from the commission's civilian members. After the front page of the Spartacus League's paper "Die Rote Fahne" on 12 February carried the headline: "The Murder of Liebknecht and Luxemburg, the Deed and the Perpetrators" by Leo Jogiches, three of the socialist members resigned from participation in the investigation. The remaining civilian members found that Jorns had done nothing to prevent a coverup of the facts in the Liebknecht / Luxemburg case.

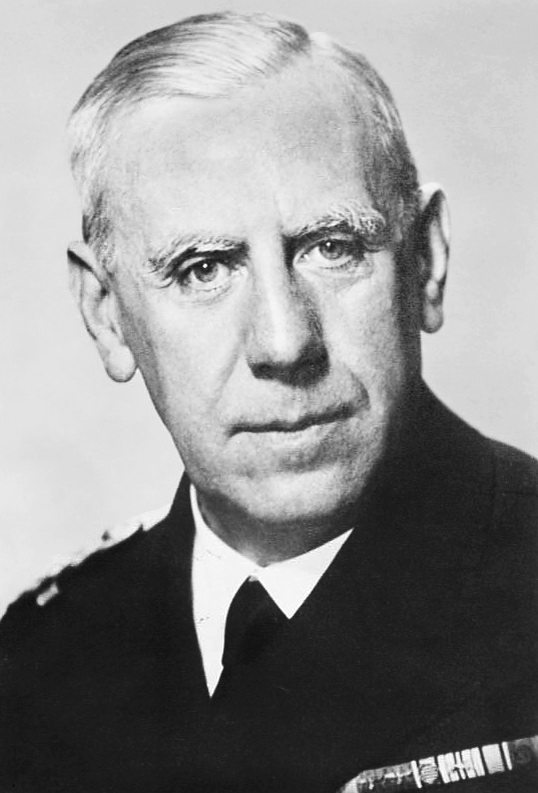
Wilhelm Canaris

It was not until May 1919 that some of the accused – including Runge and Vogel – were brought before a military court constituted by their own division. The main trial took place from 8 to 14 May 1919. On the initiative of Waldemar Pabst, Captain Lieutenant (and later Admiral) Wilhelm Canaris, a member of the staff of the Guard Cavalry Rifle Division, was named an associate judge in the trial. Wilhelm Pieck, a KPD member who was arrested along with Luxemburg and Liebknecht, was one of the most important witnesses to the incidents at the hotel that preceded the murders. He and hotel employees had been aware of the mistreatment of Luxemburg and Liebknecht and of telephone calls between officers at the scene and their superiors. Jorns sought death sentences for murder against the four officers who had used their weapons.

Vogel was sentenced on 14 May 1919 to two years and four months in prison for "the disposing of a corpse", "deliberate incorrect filing of an official report" and other offenses. Runge received a two-year prison sentence and Souchon a fine. The officers involved, the brothers Horst and Heinz von Pflugk-Harttung, were acquitted. Their commander, Waldemar Pabst, was not charged, and possible principals higher up had not been sought out. Army Minister (Reichswehrminister) Gustav Noske personally confirmed the verdicts with his signature.

== Escape ==
On 17 May 1919, Wilhelm Canaris identified himself as "Lieutenant Lindemann" at Moabit Prison, presented a transfer order signed by Jorns for the prisoner Kurt Vogel, got into a car with him and gave him an identification card issued by the Army Ministry's passport office with the name Kurt Velsen. Vogel then escaped to the Netherlands.

Hans Günther von Dincklage as "prosecutor Spatz" was entrusted with investigating Vogel's escape. He was told that Wilhelm Canaris had become engaged to Erika Waag, the woman he married later in 1919, in Pforzheim on 17 May 1919, which he accepted as Canaris' alibi for not being involved in Vogel's escape.

== Aftermath ==
It was not until two years after the trial of Vogel, Runge and others that the driver of the car Luxemburg was in, a Private Janschkow, testified in a new investigation that the "third man" alluded to in the previous trial had been Hermann Souchon. Souchon did not appear at the proceedings even though he had been summoned. In 1934, Adolf Hitler granted amnesty and even prison compensation to those involved in the Luxemburg and Liebknecht murders. The Nazi regime granted Vogel a "rest cure" out of taxpayer money.
