= Nazi Party/Foreign Organization =

Branch of the Nazi Party during WWII

- Nationalsozialistische Deutsche Arbeiterpartei/Auslands-Organisation
- Abbreviation: NSDAP/AO
- Formation: 1 May 1931; 95 years ago
- Dissolved: 8 May 1945; 81 years ago
- Leader: Hans Nieland (until 1933); Ernst Wilhelm Bohle (from 1933)
- Parent organization: Nazi Party

The Nazi Party/Foreign Organization was a branch of the Nazi Party and the 43rd and only non-territorial Gau ("region") of the Party. In German, the organization is referred to as NSDAP/AO, "AO" being the abbreviation of the German compound word Auslands-Organisation ("Foreign Organization"). Although Auslands-Organisation would be correctly written as one word, the Nazis chose an obsolete spelling with a hyphen.

Nazi Party members who lived outside the German Reich were pooled in this special Party department. On May 1, 1931, the "AO" was founded on the initiative of Reich Organization Leader (German: Reichsorganisationsleiter) Gregor Strasser, and its management was assigned to Hans Nieland, who resigned from office on May 8, 1933, because he had become head of the Hamburg police authority; he was replaced by Ernst Wilhelm Bohle. Only actual citizens of the German Reich with a German passport could become members of the AO. Persons of German descent, ethnic Germans (German: Volksdeutsche), who possessed the nationality of the country in which they lived, were refused entry to the Nazi Party.

== History ==
In 1928, party members from Paraguay and Brazil united for the first time. Similar groups were established in Switzerland and the United States in 1930. These associations were officially recognized by the Nazi Party only after the establishment of the Auslands-Organisation. Local Group Buenos Aires was accepted on August 7, 1931, followed by National Committee Paraguay (August 20, 1931) and Local Group Rio de Janeiro (October 5, 1931). From 1932 until its prohibition in 1934, a national committee existed in the Union of South Africa that was highly popular (see German Namibians), and maintained numerous offices in the former German South-West Africa (present-day Namibia). Nazi Party Local Groups (German: Ortsgruppen) included at least 25 "party comrades" (German: Parteigenossen), while the so-called Stützpunkte (English: bases, literally support points) had five members or more. Additionally, large Local Groups could be divided into "Blocs" (German: Blöcke).

The NSDAP/AO's main responsibilities were ideological training and ensuring that all party members aligned with the interests of the German nation. It aimed to unite all Party members (and members of Nazi Party-affiliated organizations) living abroad in a loosely connected group and to educate them in the philosophy, ideology, and political programs of the Nazi Party for Germany's betterment.

As early as 1931, ten principles of behavior were formulated and distributed as "commandments" to every member of the AO. They were to be treated as fundamental obligations for all Germans living abroad. These directives aimed to foster a people's community (Volksgemeinschaft) abroad, maintained by committed Nazis. They read as follows:

(1) Observe the laws of the country whose guest you are.

(2) Leave the politics of the country where you reside to its inhabitants. You are not concerned with the internal politics of a foreign country. Take no part in them, even in conversation.

(3) Acknowledge yourself as a party member at all times and in all places.

(4) Always speak and act in such a way that you bring honor to the National Socialist movement and thereby to the new Germany. Be upright, honorable, fearless, and loyal.

(5) Recognize every German abroad as your compatriot, a man of your blood and your kind. Extend your hand to him regardless of his position. We are all “creators” of our people.

(6) Help your German compatriots gladly and voluntarily when they get in difficulty through no fault of their own.

(7) Do not be merely a member but also a fighter in the foremost line. Inform yourself thoroughly of the methods, content, and aims of our movement.

(8) Work and fight day after day for the entry of every honorable German into our movement. Convince him of the superiority and justness of our movement, of the necessity of our victory in order that Germany may live on! Fight with spiritual weapons!

(9) Read our party publication, our pamphlets and books.

(10) Associate yourself with party members in your place of residence. If a local or city group exists there, be a disciplined and active worker. Not only should you not support dissension but you should also make every effort to settle disputes which arise.

== By country ==
=== Costa Rica ===
The local NSDAP/AO delegation in Costa Rica existed in the 1930s to 1940s, numbered 66 members, and lobbied for Germany during World War II. Its leaders were the engineer Max Effinger, Herbert Knöhr and Karl Bayer. They met at the German Club, which was located on Calle 21, Avenida 1, San José.

Records of the time, show that there was communication between Berlin and the German community and that there was a deliberate effort by the Third Reich to promote Nazism among the German diaspora in Costa Rica, and in the rest of Latin America. Support of German-Costa Ricans to Nazism was not uniform; apparently the older generations took it with skepticism and many others were open opponents. It had its support especially among young or German-born Germans. A branch of the Hitler Youth was created led by the director of the German School Hannes Ihring, but had problems being implemented due to the constant questioning of its participants.

One of the leaders, Max Effinger, was appointed immigration advisor in the government of León Cortés Castro (1936–1940), thus preventing the entry of many Polish Jews fleeing Germany.

=== Dominican Republic ===
By the early 1940s, the NSDAP/AO had perhaps around 50 active members in the Dominican Republic, a relatively large number considering that the German-born population in the country stood at around 150 with an additional 300 persons of German descent. The Party had organized groups in five Dominican cities: Santo Domingo, Puerto Plata, Montecristi, Cibao Valley and San Pedro de Macorís.

=== Dutch East Indies ===
The local NSDAP/AO organization in the Dutch East Indies was initially organized in June 1933 by Walther Hewel, an early associate of Adolf Hitler and a participant in the 1923 Beer Hall Putsch, who had relocated to Java in 1927 to work as a coffee planter and trader. By 1937, the NSDAP/AO had established seven local groups (Ortsgruppen) and smaller bases (Stützpunkte) across the major economic hubs of the archipelago, including Batavia (now Jakarta), Surabaya, Bandung, Semarang, Medan, Padang, and Makassar. Historians estimate that out of a population of 5,000 to 7,000 German nationals living in the colony, between 15% and 25% of all German adults became card-carrying members of the Nazi Party.

The entire apparatus was dismantled in a single day on May 10, 1940, during "Operation Bergen." Following the German invasion of the Netherlands, Dutch colonial authorities immediately arrested all German males on the islands, liquidating the party’s assets and records. Following the subsequent Japanese occupation of the Dutch East Indies, a group of 67 German survivors who had escaped the sinking of the deportation ship SS Van Imhoff staged a mutiny against Dutch guards and briefly established the unrecognized, Hitler-aligned "Free Republic of Nias" on Nias Island from March 29 to April 17, 1942, before being dissolved by incoming Japanese forces.

=== Finland ===
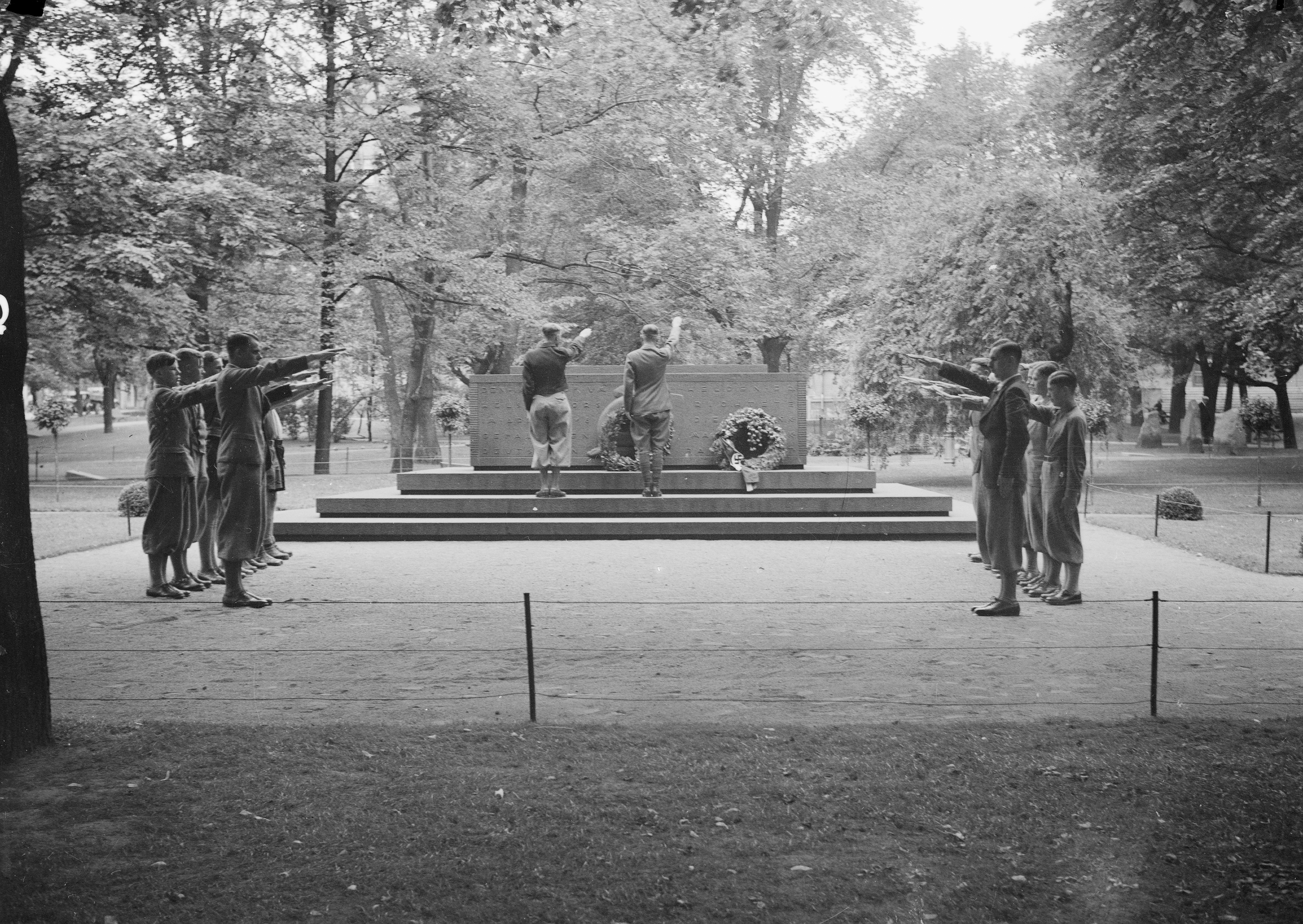
Finnish Hitler Jugend saluting a memorial for German combatants of Finnish Civil War in Helsinki.

Auslands-Organisation der NSDAP Landeskreis Finnland was the Finnish local group of the German Nazi party. The Finnish party organization began its activities in 1932, when local German citizens founded the local organization of the Nazi party (Ortsgruppe) in Helsinki. It received support from the party's expatriate organization, the German embassy, the teachers' and students' union of the German school in Helsinki, and the school's support association. In the mid-1930s, the NSDAP's Finnish country district (Landeskreis) was established, under which, in addition to the Helsinki local group, at least Ortsgruppe Turku and Vaasa and Stützpunkt Tampere operated. Businessman Herbert Howaldt was the initial leader of the Finnish district (Kreisleiter) until about 1937, when businessman Wilhelm Jahre became the leader. Jahre also served on the boards of the Finnish-German Society, the German Chamber of Commerce and the German School. The party organization had its own internal court that mediated disputes between members. The premises of the party organizations were located at Unioninkatu 7, but meetings, club events and other events were held at the premises of the German colony in the White Hall at Aleksanterinkatu 16–18 or at a German school (Malminkatu 14). The premises of the party organization were moved to Vuorimiehenkatu 7 A in 1943 and to Bulevardi 30 B 6 in June 1944. The National Socialist People's Welfare service organization also had an office at Tehtaankatu 11 B. According to researcher Henrik Ekberg, the Finnish National Socialist parties had occasional contacts with the NSDAP's Finnish local group. Hermann Souchon, known for executing Rosa Luxemburg, worked as Landesgruppenleiter (regional leader) in the Finnish chapter of the NSDAP/AO.

=== Ireland ===
Ireland/Éire (known as the Irish Free State until 1937) was neutral during the war (Northern Ireland was and is part of the United Kingdom), and several Germans and Austrians in the country were active in NSDAP/AO. Adolf Mahr, director of the National Museum of Ireland, was also Ortsgruppenleiter of the local Nazi party until 1939; he was succeeded by Heinz Mecking, who was head of the Turf Development Board. The military musician and composer Fritz Brase was also a member.

The AO's duties included monitoring Germans in Ireland, sending reports on Irish events to Berlin, and asserting the dominance of the Nazi Party over other agencies of the German government abroad, such as the Foreign Office (Auswärtiges Amt) which was not seen as sufficiently pro-Nazi. The Irish AO had its own branch of the Hitler Youth and included officials of the Electricity Supply Board. Ireland's intelligence agency G2 monitored NSDAP/AO activity in the country.

=== Sweden ===
NSDAP/AO had a Landesgruppe Schweden. During the first years of World War II it was led by W. Stengel, but the leadership was later taken over by the German diplomat Heinz Gossmann. There were several Ortsgruppen in different parts of Sweden, such as Gothenburg, Borås, etc.

== See also ==
- German-American Bund
- Nazi Party (NSDAP)
- NSDAP/AO (1972)
- Germanic SS
- The Swastika Outside Germany
