= Hermann Souchon =

German Naval officer

Hermann Wilhelm Souchon (German pronunciation: [suˈʃɔŋ]; 2 January 1895 – 1982) was a German naval officer and the suspected assassin, according to the testimonies of two accomplices, of Marxist theorist Rosa Luxemburg on 15 January 1919 in Berlin.

== Biography ==
Souchon, a nephew of Admiral Wilhelm Souchon, was born in Bromberg, Province of Posen, Kingdom of Prussia (now Bydgoszcz, Poland). He served in the First World War as lieutenant in an artillery regiment. In 1915, he went to the Imperial Navy as an ensign. After the end of the war, he was discharged and became a member of Marinebrigade Ehrhardt. This Freikorps was active in Berlin in January 1919, as part of the Garde-Kavallerie-Schützen-Division under General Lieutenant Heinrich von Hofmann.

On 15 January 1919, Rosa Luxemburg and Karl Liebknecht were captured at Berlin-Wilmersdorf by the Garde-Kavallerie-Schützendivision and brought to their headquarters at Hotel Eden. Captain Waldemar Pabst, along with Horst von Pflugk-Harttung questioned them and gave the order to execute them. When they were being transported, Souchon jumped onto the car. He was one of two people accused of having shot Luxemburg in the head after Otto Runge had knocked her down with a rifle butt. In 1920, he flew to Finland where he worked as a bank clerk and became a sympathizer of the Lapua Movement. Souchon became the leader of the chapter of the NSDAP/AO in Finland.

After Hitler granted amnesty to those involved in the murders of Liebknecht and Luxemburg, Souchon returned to Germany in 1935 and joined the Luftwaffe, where he rose to the rank of colonel (Oberst) during the war. After the war, he lived in Bad Godesberg.

When a documentary report on the Liebknecht-Luxemburg story was first shown in 1969 on German television ARD, Souchon with his lawyer Otto Kranzbühler sued the broadcaster, which had to retract their statement of Souchon's guilt in February 1970. Since the 1980s, the documentary has been shown again a few times and is now publicly available.
