= The Swastika Outside Germany =

1977 book by Donald McKale

- Author: Donald M. McKale
- Language: English
- Genre: Non-fiction
- Publisher: Kent State University Press
- Publication date: 1977
- Publication place: United States
- Pages: 288
- ISBN: 0-87338-209-9

The Swastika Outside Germany is a book by Donald M. McKale. It is a history of the Nationalsozialistische Deutsche Arbeiter-Partei Auslands-Organisation (NSDAP/AO, National Socialist German Workers' Party Foreign Organization), an institution created by Nazi Germany as a network of Nazi groups outside Germany.

It was published in 1977 by Kent State University Press as a 288-page hardcover (ISBN 0-87338-209-9).
