= Ernst Wilhelm Bohle =

German Nazi, leader of the Foreign Organization of the NSDAP (1903–1960)

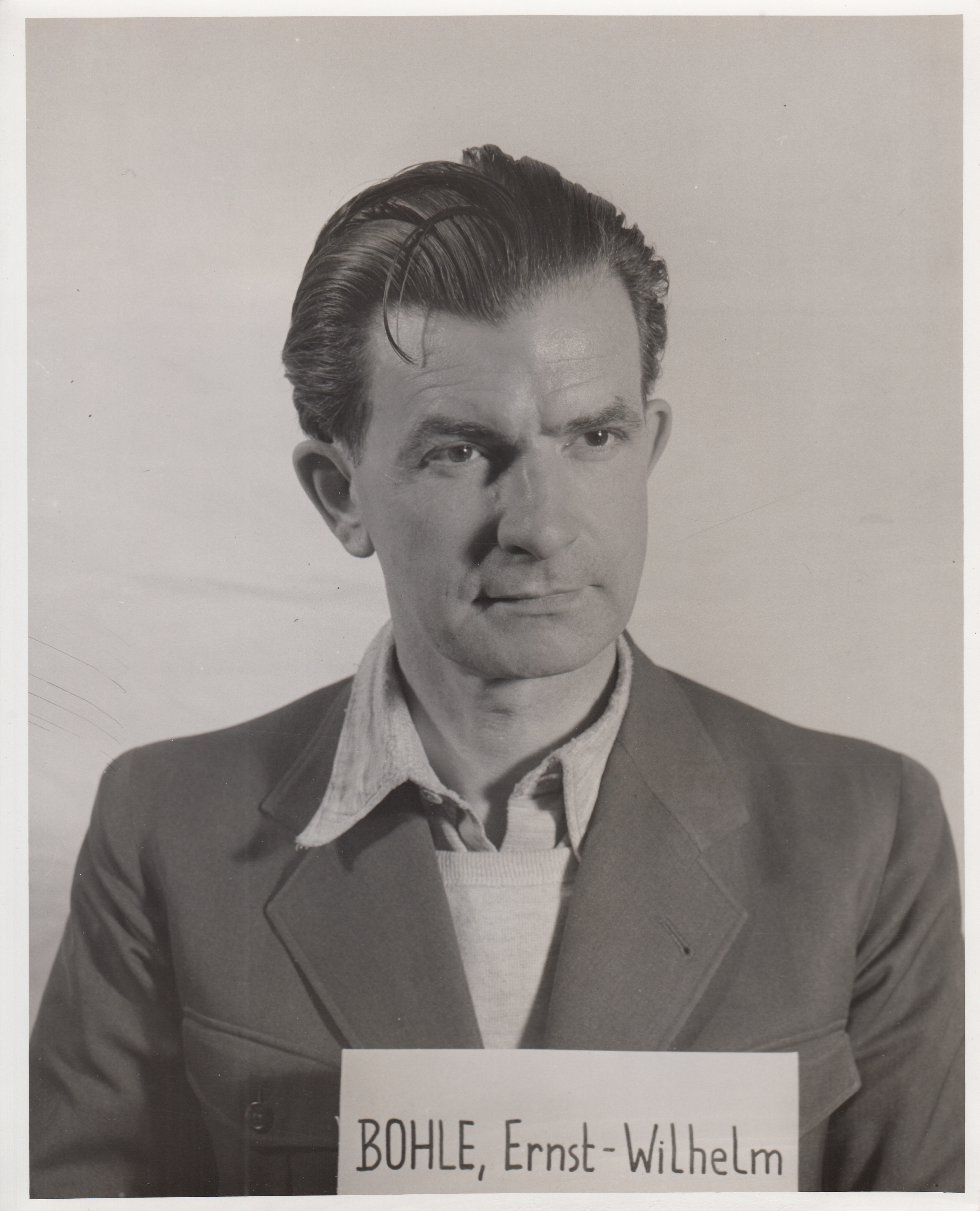
- Bohle in Allied custody c. 1947

Gauleiter of Auslands-Organisation (AO)
- In office 17 February 1934 – 8 May 1945
- Preceded by: Position created
- Succeeded by: Position abolished

Head of Department for Germans Abroad
- In office 8 May 1933 – 17 February 1934

State Secretary in the Reichsministry of Foreign Affairs
- In office 21 December 1937 – 8 May 1945

Personal details
- Born: 28 July 1903 Bradford, England, UK
- Died: 9 November 1960 (aged 57) Düsseldorf, North Rhine-Westphalia, West Germany
- Party: Nazi Party
- Occupation: Business manager

Ernst Wilhelm Bohle (28 July 1903 – 9 November 1960) was the Gauleiter (regional leader) of the Foreign Organization of the National Socialist German Workers' Party (NSDAP or Nazi Party) from 1934 until 1945. Bohle was the only defendant in the Subsequent Nuremberg trials of 1946–1949 to plead guilty to any charge.

== Early life ==
Bohle was born in Bradford, England, the son of Hermann Bohle (1876–1943), a college teacher and engineer who emigrated to England. In 1906, Bohle moved to Cape Town, where his father was appointed to a professorship of electrical engineering, and attended a high school there. Bohle studied political science and economics for six semesters at the University of Cologne and the Humboldt University of Berlin where he was a member of the Berliner Burschenschaft Gothia student corps. He then graduated in business management from the Handelshochschule, Berlin, in December 1923. He married Gertrud Bachmann on 14 November 1925. Bohle was employed as branch manager and agent in the import-export business for several enterprises in the Rheinland from 1924 until 1930 and established and thereafter directed a large automotive firm in Hamburg from 1930 to June 1933.

== Nazi career ==
Bohle joined the Nazi Party on 1 March 1932 (membership number 999,185) and on 13 September 1936 he joined the SS (membership number 276,915) at the rank of SS-Brigadeführer. Bohle was promoted SS-Gruppenführer on 20 April 1937 and SS-Obergruppenführer on 21 June 1943.

In early 1932 he became adjutant to Hans Nieland, the leader of the Foreign Organisation of the NSDAP (NSDAP Auslands-Organisation; NSDAP/AO), responsible for South and South-West Africa and later for North America. The NSDAP/AO was founded on 1 May 1931 in Hamburg, and "Reich Organisation Leader" (German: Reichsorganisationsleiter) Gregor Strasser appointed Nieland as its chief. Nieland resigned from office on 8 May 1933 (because he had become head of the Hamburg police and would later become a member of the Hamburg State government). Bohle was charged with the leadership of the NSDAP Department for Germans Abroad (Abteilung für Deutsche im Ausland) which from October 1933 reported to Deputy-Führer Rudolf Hess. However, on 17 February 1934 the office was redesignated Auslands-Organisation der NSDAP and Bohle was raised to the rank of Gauleiter. (Ernst Bohle's father Hermann Bohle served as NSDAP/AO Landesgruppenleiter (Leader of the National Committee) in the Union of South Africa from 1932 until 1934, and he became president of the Berlin-based German South-African Society (German: Deutsch-Südafrikanische Gesellschaft) in 1938.)

The Auslands-Organisation (AO) grew rapidly under Bohle's leadership, going from 3,350 members in 1933 to 52,648 in 1939. Bohle provided intelligence from abroad, but most of the information was merely taken from local newspapers and was of little value. The Reichsführer-SS, Heinrich Himmler, whose knowledge of the world outside of Germany was very superficial and shallow, greatly valued the reports that Bohle sent him. The AO worked closely with the Abwehr in recruiting spies for Germany, mostly in the Netherlands, Argentina, Chile and Switzerland. The Swiss economy was very closely integrated with the German economy, and for this reason the Swiss government tolerated the AO's activities in Switzerland until well into World War Two. One country where the AO did not recruit spies was the United States as it sought to discourage the German American Bund from recruiting spies under the grounds that the Bund members were not competent enough to serve as spies.

From 12 November 1933 till the end of Nazi Germany in 1945, Bohle was a member of the Reichstag for electoral constituency 31 (Württemberg) and from December 1937 to May 1945 he was a State Secretary in the Reichsministry of Foreign Affairs. Because of his British heritage, Bohle was reported to be Hitler's choice to become the future Gauleiter of Britain. His influence at the Foreign Office was greatly exaggerated, to the extent that Bohle was mentioned in the foreign press as a likely successor to Reichsminister Joachim von Ribbentrop. He was also a confidant and on the staff of Rudolf Hess, the Deputy Führer, until Hess' failed peace-mission to Great Britain in May 1941.

== Trial and conviction ==
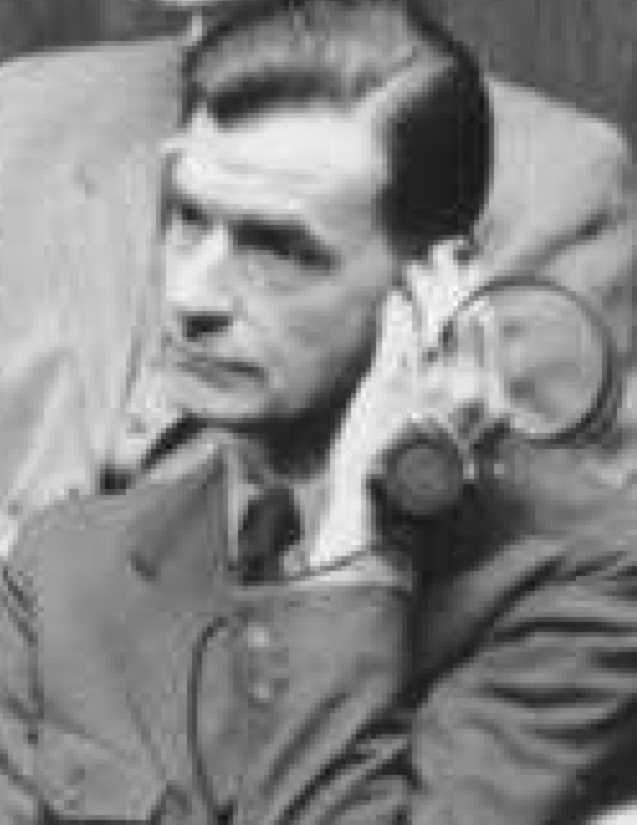
Bohle on trial, 1947

Bohle surrendered to US forces on 23 May 1945 at Falkenau and was interned in Camp Ashcan with other high ranking Nazi officials. Bohle appeared on 25 March 1946 as a defense witness at the International Military Tribunal in Nuremberg. Subsequently, Bohle was tried as a defendant in the "Ministries Trial" ("Wilhelmstraßen-Prozeß"), one of the Nuremberg follow-up trials. Although he was acquitted of war crimes and crimes against humanity, the tribunal ruled that Bohle and his department did persuade German business firms to fire Jewish employees working for them abroad.

"Bohle's acts and those of his department in persuading German business firms to discharge Jewish employees working for them abroad, while reprehensible from a moral standpoint, do not come within the scope of either count five of the indictment or of the crimes defined by the London Charter and Control Council Law No. 10."

Bohle, in an unusual move, became the only defendant in the Subsequent Nuremberg trials to plead guilty to any charge. Bohle pleaded guilty to having been a member of the SS and assisted the prosecution in their case against the other defendants. Before entering his guilty plea, Bohle read a formal statement:

"I think it should be the solemn pledge and foremost duty of every German who held a leading position during the National Socialist regime, to do all in his power to remove from the name of Germany the blot which the deeds of criminal brains have cast upon it. We know that a low estimate of human life and carelessness to human misery is not and never has been a trait of the German character, and for that very reason I think that we should frankly admit the atrocities that have been committed and that have defiled the German name in the world. I do not think that we should attempt to vindicate our own national honor solely by referring to crimes and misdeeds committed by others, some of which are undoubtedly on a par with what national socialism is accused of. I think we should be too proud for that. And I think – it is my firm conviction that the world will regain its belief in our national honesty only if we ourselves are honest and straightforward in our confessions and thereafter also in our will to make amends. I think we leading men have this responsibility, not only to the victims of these crimes but just as much to the German people, as such, who, with or without our participation, were misled and misguided and are today, without any fault of their own, outlawed in the world. That is what I understand by responsibility beyond that of my own work."

Bohle was sentenced to five years in prison on 11 April 1949. Due to his cooperation and guilty plea, Bohle was an extremely unpopular inmate at Landsberg Prison, which the U.S. military was using to house Nazi war criminals. Facing constant threats from other members of the SS, Bohle had to be placed in solitary confinement. He was eventually given slightly more freedom, but received hard labour tasks. Bohle was released from prison on 21 December 1954, several months before his full sentence expired. After his release, he worked as a merchant in Hamburg.

In the immediate aftermath of his release, Bohle remarked that many West German youths still believed in Nazism and were refusing to believe what West German and Allied officials said. However, due to his close ties to Hitler, Bohle said these youths were willing to believe what he said. Bohle said Hitler had become insane in the final few months before the war ended, and possibly went mad as early as 1943. He also said that in a way, Hitler was insane before the war.

Bohle also advocated for the reformation of an organization for the development of German South-African interstate commerce. He died in Düsseldorf. Robert Kempner dedicated a short obituary to Bohle, whom he'd met while visiting Landsberg Prison. He remarked that out of hundreds of inmates there, Bohle was one of the few who seemed genuinely remorseful and had asked for forgiveness for his complicity in the Nazi regime.

== See also ==
- List of SS-Obergruppenführer
