= Hans Nieland =

German Nazi politician (1900–1976)

Hans Heinrich Nieland

Oberbürgermeister of Dresden
- In office 5 March 1940 – 19 February 1945
- Preceded by: Rudolf Kluge
- Succeeded by: Adalbert Wolpert

Senator, Hamburg State Government
- In office 18 May 1933 – 5 March 1940

Police Chief, Hamburg
- In office 5 March 1933 – 18 May 1933

Leader, NSDAP/AO (as Gauleiter 1 October 1932 – 15 March 1933)
- In office 1 May 1931 – 8 May 1933
- Preceded by: Position created
- Succeeded by: Ernst Wilhelm Bohle

Reichstag Deputy
- In office 14 September 1930 – 12 November 1933

Personal details
- Born: 3 October 1900 Hagen, Province of Westphalia, Kingdom of Prussia, German Empire
- Died: 29 August 1976 (aged 75) Reinbek, Schleswig-Holstein, West Germany
- Resting place: Ohlsdorf Cemetery, Hamburg
- Party: Nazi Party
- Education: Ph.D.
- Alma mater: University of Göttingen; University of Hamburg; University of Münster
- Profession: Lawyer
- Civilian awards: Golden Party Badge

Military service
- Allegiance: German Empire; Nazi Germany
- Branch/service: Imperial German Army; German Army
- Years of service: 1918; 1936–1945
- Rank: Oberleutnant
- Unit: Field Artillery Regiment 22 (2nd Westphalian)
- Battles/wars: World War I World War II
- Military awards: War Merit Cross, 2nd class

Hans Nieland (3 October 1900 – 29 August 1976) was a German lawyer and politician of the Nazi Party. He was elected to the Reichstag in 1930 and was the first leader of the NSDAP Foreign Organization from 1931 to 1933. As a senator, he was a leading executive of the state government of Hamburg from 1933 to 1940. He then served as Oberbürgermeister of Dresden from 1940 until 1945. He was placed on leave after the Allied air raids of February 1945. He held the rank of SS-Brigadeführer in the Allgemeine SS. At the end of the Second World War, he was interned by the Allies and underwent denazification, after which he worked in banking.

== Early life and education ==
Nieland was born in Hagen the son of a salesman, and attended the local Volksschule and Realgymnasium. He was drafted into the Imperial German Army in June 1918 after completion of his studies. He fought in the First World War as a gunner with Field Artillery Regiment 22 (2nd Westphalian), saw two months of front line service and was discharged in December 1918, one month after the end of the war. From February 1919, he studied political science at the universities of Göttingen and Hamburg. While at Hamburg, he joined the Hamburger Burschenschaft Germania student corps.

After the end of his studies in July 1922, Nieland worked as a commercial clerk for three years in two Hamburg export firms. From May 1925 to April 1927, he trained for a career in local and provincial administration. As a Westphalian court bailiff, he worked for the Landrat (district administrator) of Kirchhörde (today, part of Dortmund) and of Hagen, and the Regierungspräsident (regional president) of Münster. In 1925, he received his doctorate in political science at Hamburg. His doctoral thesis, completed in June 1925, was entitled Power as a Governmental Concept of Law: An Analysis of the German Reich's Constitutional Law Situation Under the Rule of the Versailles Treaty. From November 1926 until March 1928, he studied law at the universities of Münster and Göttingen. He passed the first state law examination at Celle and, in December 1928, he became a Referendar (trainee lawyer) with the Altona legal authorities.

== Nazi Party career ==
=== Postings in Hamburg ===
On 30 January 1926, Nieland joined the Nazi Party (NSDAP) with membership number 33,333. As an early Party member, he would later be awarded the Golden Party Badge. He became a Bezirksführer (district leader) in his hometown and advanced to a Sektionsführer (section leader) in Hamburg in 1929. From June 1930 to May 1931, he was the organizational leader of Gau Hamburg. At the parliamentary election of 14 September 1930, he was elected as a deputy of the Reichstag for electoral constituency 34 (Hamburg). He served on the foreign affairs committee and was reelected three times, serving until November 1933.

On 1 May 1931, NSDAP Reichsorganisationsleiter (Reich Organization Leader) Gregor Strasser appointed Nieland as the first leader of the Auslandsabteilung (foreign department) based in Hamburg, a new component in the Nazi Party Reichsleitung (national leadership). The new organization was to disseminate propaganda and coordinate the Party's activities abroad through the formation of Ortsgruppen (local groups). Nieland did not seem a natural choice for this post, as he had never lived abroad, spoke no foreign languages and had little understanding of, or knowledge of how to address, the problems of Germans abroad. However, Nieland visited the Netherlands and the United Kingdom from 1931 to 1932, staying in London from 15–19 January 1932, where he spoke to an audience of approximately 200 people.

On 14 June 1932, Nieland became the leader of the League of Friends of the Hitler Movement, an organization open only to German citizens living abroad. The League was intended to promote the Nazi movement abroad and to raise funds for party activities in Germany. By the autumn of 1932, Nieland had demonstrated considerable success expanding the numbers of foreign Nazis, from fifty names when he assumed control to over 150 Ortsgruppe. On 21 November 1933, Strasser announced that Nieland's foreign department was redesignated Gau Ausland effective 1 October and that he was granted the Party rank of Gauleiter. However, his advancement was short-lived due to the withdrawal of his patron, Strasser, who resigned on 8 December in a policy dispute with Adolf Hitler over the future of the Party.

Following the January 1933 Nazi seizure of power, Nieland was appointed acting leader of the Hamburg police on 5 March 1933, and was formally named the police president on 15 March. On that date, Gau Ausland was downgraded to a department of the Reichsleitung and relocated to Munich by Strasser's successor, Robert Ley. It was renamed Abteilung für Deutsche im Ausland (Department for Germans Abroad), losing its prestigious status as a Gau. Nieland attempted to reverse this change by writing personal letters to Adolf Hitler, alleging intrigues against him by the Nazi Party leadership, but he was unsuccessful. Nieland left his leadership role in May with the official explanation that his new police position in Hamburg would prevent him from devoting adequate attention to the foreign department. On 8 May 1933, Ernst Wilhelm Bohle was named head of the new Abteilung für Deutsche im Ausland.

Nieland joined the Hamburg state government in which he served as an executive senator from May 1933 until March 1940. From 18 May 1933, he was Senator for the Building Authority, and on 1 October he also became Senator for Economics, Technology and Labor. On 1 January 1934, he was appointed Senator for Financial Administration, the president of the finance committee and the commissioner for civil service affairs, holding these portfolios until March 1940. From May 1936, Nieland served in the army reserves, rising to the rank of Oberleutnant in January 1939. After the Greater Hamburg Act came into force in April 1937, Nieland was appointed a city councilor and city treasurer for life. In March 1938, he became the chairman of the administrative council of the Hamburg state central bank.

=== Mayor of Dresden ===
On 16 February 1940, Reich Minister of the Interior Wilhelm Frick selected Nieland as Oberbürgermeister of Dresden, the capital of Saxony, at the suggestion of Reichsstatthalter (Reich Governor) Martin Mutschmann. Sworn in on 5 March 1940, his tenure was marked by difficulties caused by the wartime conditions, which led to conflicts with Mutschmann. At the end of 1942, Nieland tried to transfer to the Propaganda Ministry. He obtained a position as Deputy Reichsfilmintendant at the ministry and served as the acting Reichsfilmintendant from March to June 1943, but ultimately had to return to his mayoral post. After the heavy Allied air raids of 13 and 14 February 1945, which killed about 25,000 inhabitants and totally destroyed the historic baroque city center, Nieland's inability to organize relief efforts led Mutschmann to place him on leave on 19 February, and the deputy mayor took over the city administration. Nieland left Dresden on 23 February 1945, disappeared completely for eight days and resurfaced in Berlin on 3 March 1945. He was then assigned to the office of the German plenipotentiary to the government of Denmark and served there until the end of the Second World War as an Oberleutnant on the staff of the commander of the Wehrmacht occupation forces, Generaloberst Georg Lindemann.

=== Schutzstaffel (SS) member ===
In addition to his Party and government responsibilities, Nieland was also a member of the Allgemeine SS, joining the Nazi paramilitary organization on 21 November 1933 (membership number 61,702). He was assigned to the staff of SS-Oberabschnitt (SS Upper Section) Nord (redesignated Nordwest in April 1936) headquartered in Hamburg, effective January 1934. He rose through the ranks, attaining the rank of SS-Brigadeführer on 30 January 1939. On 1 April 1940, he was transferred to the staff of SS-Oberabschnitt Elbe, headquartered in Dresden.

SS ranks
| Date | Rank |
|---|---|
| November 1933 | SS-Obertruppführer |
| 15 January 1934 | SS-Sturmbannführer |
| 20 April 1934 | SS-Obersturmbannführer' |
| 9 September 1934 | SS-Standartenführer |
| 29 May 1935 | SS-Oberführer |
| 30 January 1939 | SS-Brigadeführer |

== Post-war life ==
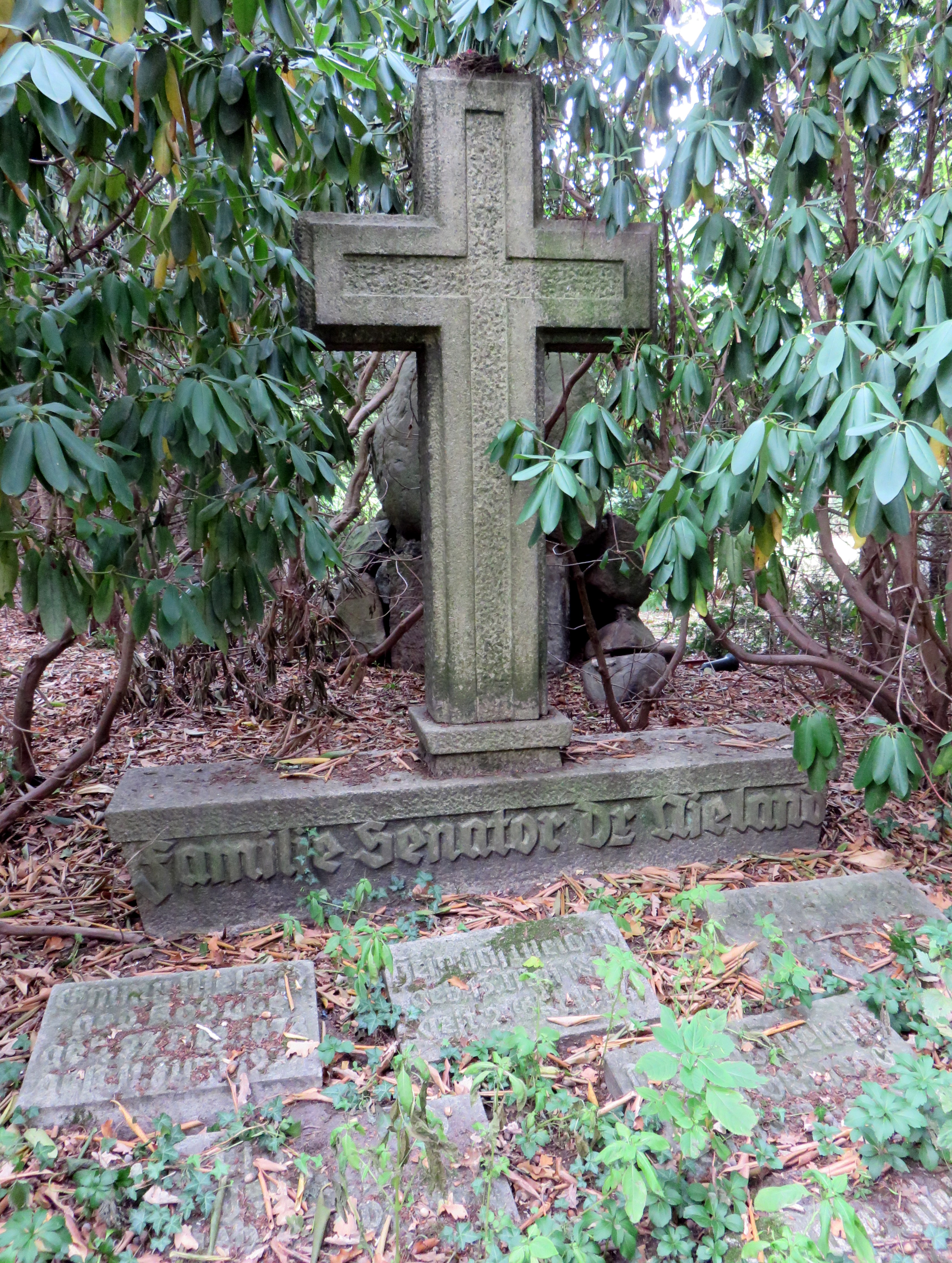
Nieland's grave at Ohlsdorf Cemetery in Hamburg

From 2 June 1945 until August 1948, Nieland was detained in several British internment facilities, including Internierungslager Gadeland near Neumünster and Internierungslager Staumühle, near Paderborn. In August 1948, a denazification proceeding in Bielefeld assessed a fine, which was waived in consideration of time served. In 1949, Nieland was classified as a minderbelastet (lesser offender), and on appeal in 1950 as a Mitläufer (follower). After being released, he worked for a time as a consulting economist and as a banker in Hamburg. He moved to Reinbek in 1973, where he died.

== Sources ==
- Hans Nieland entry in Sächsische Biografie
- Information about Hans Nieland in the Reichstag database
- Katharina Tenti; Rita Bake: Hans Nieland entry in Biografien-Datenbank: NS‑Dabeigewesene
- McKale, Donald M. (1977). The Swastika Outside Germany. Kent State University Press. ISBN 978-0-873-38209-0.
- Miller, Michael D.; Schulz, Andreas (2017). Gauleiter: The Regional Leaders of the Nazi Party and Their Deputies, 1925–1945. Vol. 2 (Georg Joel – Dr. Bernhard Rust). R. James Bender Publishing. ISBN 978-1-932-97032-6.
