= Otto Kranzbühler =

German naval judge (1907–2004)

Otto Heinrich Kranzbühler
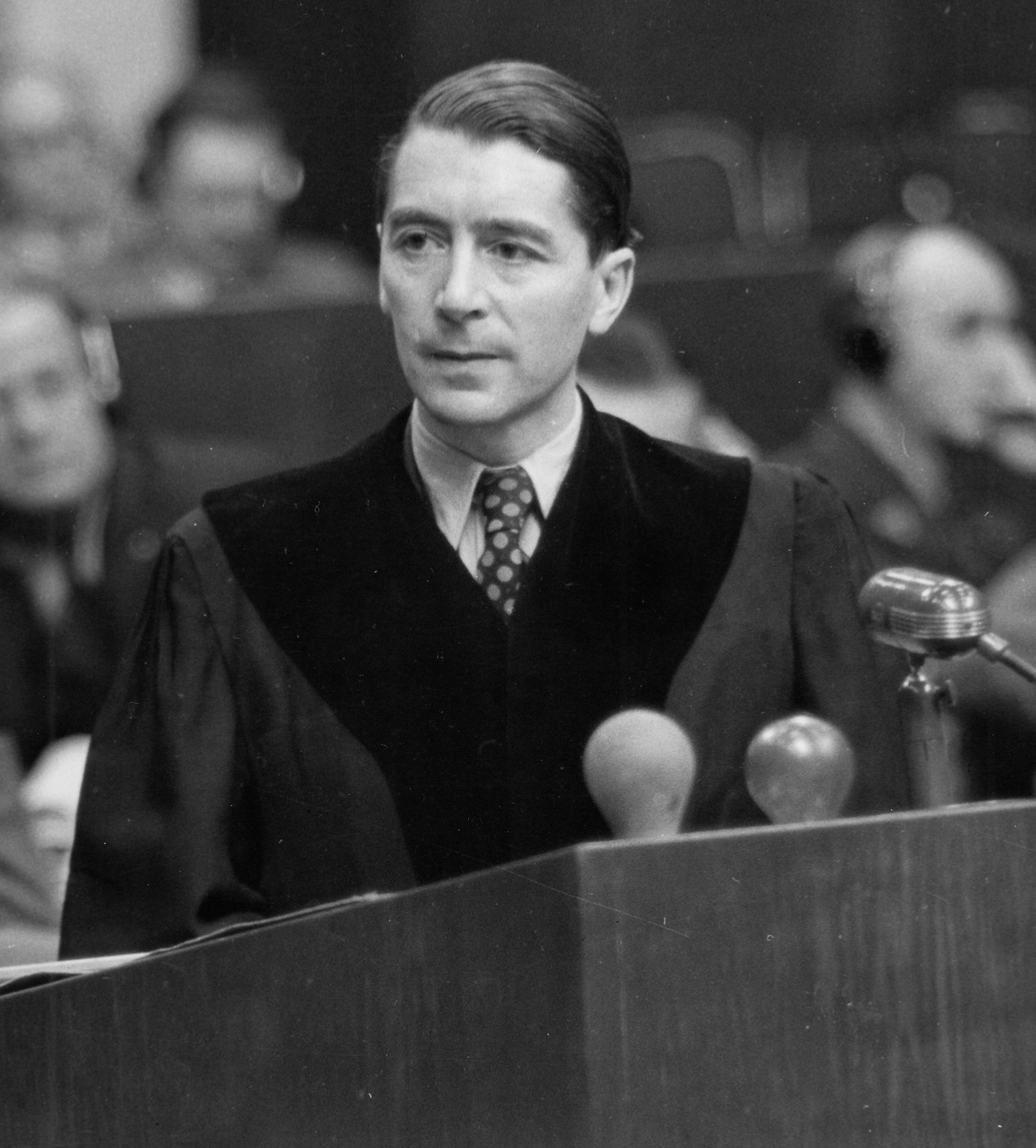
- Born: 8 July, 1907; Berlin, German Empire
- Died: 9 August, 2004 (aged 97); Tegernsee, Germany
- Occupation: Naval judge
- Known for: Representing defendant Grand Admiral Karl Dönitz

Otto Heinrich Kranzbühler (also spelled Kranzbuehler, German pronunciation: [ˈɔtoː ˈhaɪnʁɪç ˈkʁantsˌbyːlɐ]; 8 July 1907 – 9 August 2004) was a German naval judge who represented defendant Grand Admiral Karl Dönitz before the International Military Tribunal at the Nuremberg Trials.

== Early life and education ==
Otto Kranzbühler was born in Berlin, German Empire, on 8 July 1907, the youngest son of German Lieutenant Commander Henry Kranzbühler (1871-1946). He had two sisters: Caroline (1898–1969) and Elizabeth (1904–1981) and one brother: Helmuth (1901–1978).

Kranzbühler graduated from secondary school in 1925. Following secondary school, Kranzbühler studied law in Freiburg, Bonn, Geneva, and Kiel, passing the German law exam by his 21st birthday in 1928. During his legal studies, Kranzbühler became particularly interested in boating – perhaps sparking his later interest in naval law.

== Legal career ==
In 1934, Kranzbühler voluntarily enlisted into the Reichsmarine. By 1937, he was sent to Berlin to act as a legal advisor to the Naval High Command. In 1943, he was sent to France and appointed as Naval Fleet Judge-Advocate, or Flottenrichter. Kranzbühler remained in France until the winter of 1944, when Germany withdrew from France. In the winter of 1944, Kranzbühler moved to Wilhelmshaven, the main operating base for the Kriegsmarine. By April 1945, Kranzbühler was brutally beaten, arrested, detained and interrogated for approximately four weeks by Allied Forces, along with other German navy judges.

During the immediate post-war period, both the British and the Americans utilized former Kriegsmarine personnel to maintain, transfer, and destroy Kriegsmarine vessels and assets, and to clear mines. Kranzbühler was not immune from these assignments, even though he was a Naval Judge. In fact, for several months, he served on the German Minesweeping Administration.

His minesweeping activities, however, were short lived. In October 1945, Kranzbühler was called by the agency of the British Royal Navy to Nuremberg to serve as defense counsel for Grand Admiral Karl Dönitz, Commander and Chief of the Kriegsmarine, before the International Military Trial in Nuremberg. Dönitz specifically requested Kranzbühler, a fellow Kriegsmarine, to represent him in his defense.

== Kranzbühler before the IMT at Nuremberg ==
Before the International Military Tribunal at Nuremberg, Dönitz was indicted as a major war criminal on three counts: (1) "conspiracy to commit crimes against peace", (2) "Planning, initiating, and waging wars of aggression", and (3) "crimes against the laws of war". Dönitz was not indicted on a fourth count of "crimes against humanity". Kranzbühler had the unprecedented task of defending Nazi Germany's last Reichspräsident (President) and Grand Admiral.

Kranzbühler made his presence known immediately. In his very first court appearance, he appeared before the international tribunal in his full Kriegsmarine uniform, indicating that if the head of the Navy was on trial, then it would be the Navy that would defend him. This entrance caught the immediate attention of the members of the court.

The indictments made against Dönitz bothered Kranzbühler a great deal. As a result, he wanted to make it immediately clear to the tribunal that, though on the losing side of the war, Dönitz's actions were not deserving of the indictments brought against him. Kranzbühler argued that if the Grand Admiral of the German Navy was to be tried, he should be addressed by the court with the respect he deserved as a military leader. While the prosecutors (including Chief Prosecutor Robert Jackson) and judges at Nuremberg continued to address the defendant without any recognition, Kranzbühler always referred to Dönitz as Grand Admiral, or "Herr Grossadmiral".

=== Count 1 ===
As for Count 1 of the indictment (conspiracy to commit a crime under international law), Kranzbühler argued that Dönitz was not privy to the conspiracy to commit crimes against the peace, since he was not present at the relevant war planning conferences. The Tribunal did not find Dönitz guilty on this count.

=== Count 2 ===
As for Count 2 of the indictment (Planning, initiating, and waging wars of aggression), Kranzbühler once again relied on the fact that Dönitz was not present to plan or initiate a particular type of war because he was merely performing tactical duties and not present at the war planning conferences. The Tribunal, as it did in Count 1, agreed with this conclusion. However, arguing that Dönitz did not wage a war of aggression would be a difficult assignment for Kranzbühler. In later writings, Kranzbühler noted this difficulty because in his opinion the term "war of aggression" was never adequately defined. The U-boat Arm was the principal part of the German fleet – with its submarines sinking millions of tons of allied and neutral shipping. Dönitz's fleet had been successful, and this success was unavoidable. Kranzbühler argued that Dönitz's actions were consistent with the actions of a successful Admiral during war. Nevertheless, the Tribunal found that Dönitz was active in waging an aggressive war.

=== Count 3 ===
As for Count 3 of the indictment, (crimes against the laws of war, or war crimes), Dönitz was specifically charged with waging unrestricted submarine warfare contrary to the Naval Protocol of 1936 to which Germany acceded – particularly that (1) Dönitz ordered the German U-Boat arm to attack both enemy and neutral merchant ships without warning and that (2) Dönitz issued orders not to rescue survivors from ships attacked by submarine.

In reference to the charge of waging unrestricted submarine warfare on all merchant ships, Dönitz argued that he ordered the attack of merchant ships because his reports indicated that British merchant ships were armed, attacking submarines on sight, and being used to transmit information. To defend Dönitz against the charge that orders to sink merchant vessels were illegal, Kranzbühler brilliantly presented to Fleet Admiral Chester W. Nimitz, commander of the United States Pacific Fleet, an interrogatory in which he extracted various items of information about American naval practice. Nimitz answered questions describing the practice of the United States Navy concerning submarines and merchant ships, especially when a submarine crew had no way of knowing whether or not the ship was armed. The answers made it clear that the German practice of attacking merchant ships was indistinguishable from American practice and therefore was not criminal. The Tribunal held that the practice violated international protocols, but excluded this aspect from consideration in sentencing him.

Dönitz was also accused of waging unrestricted submarine warfare for issuing orders not to rescue survivors from ships attacked by submarine – specifically War Order No. 154 in 1939 and another similar order after the Laconia incident in 1942. Kranzbühler argued that the security of the submarine is paramount to rescue and that to risk the submarine to rescue survivors from ships would be contrary to typical naval behavior. Yet, unlike in the merchant ship argument, Kranzbühler was unable to attain an affidavit from Allied Forces that Americans had done the same – even though they arguably did. As a result, by issuing these two orders Dönitz was found guilty of causing Germany to be in breach of the Second London Naval Treaty of 1936.

=== Count 4 ===
Kranzbühler did not defend Dönitz on count 4 (crimes against humanity) because Dönitz was not indicted regarding this count.

== Sentencing of Dönitz ==
Dönitz was sentenced to 10 years in prison – solely for his conviction related to waging a war of aggression. Once again, Dönitz's order to conduct unrestricted submarine warfare was not officially included in his sentence; however this was still the main reason why most judges wanted him convicted. Dönitz served 10 years in Spandau Prison plus the additional 5 months he had spent at Mondorf and Nuremberg while awaiting trial and being tried.

Kranzbühler was bothered by the ultimate verdict. Remarking on the conviction, he noted that "This conviction was born out of the dilemma to take the Grand Admiral into prison for political reasons". According to Kranzbühler years later "As I learned later on, an American law advisor made the proposal to the Allied control office to nullify the verdict."

== Kranzbühler’s critique of the Nuremberg Trials ==
In 1964, Kranzbühler published a De Paul University law review article entitled "Nuremberg Eighteen Years Afterwards" in which he provided a unique first hand critique of the Nuremberg proceedings. In evaluating the Nuremberg Trials, Kranzbühler found it necessary to consider not only the cases against the highly publicized political and military defendants before the International Military Tribunal but also the 12 subsequent purely American trials which were directed against the activities of the SS (Schutzstaffel), military generals and field marshals, industrial leaders, jurists, medical doctors, and diplomats. Kranzbühler considered both the internationally governed trial and the American governed trials because he believed they were all based on a "common idea of the American prosecution" – that members of the elite, regardless of their criminal participation, would be held responsible for the actions carried out by Hitler and his aides. With this in mind, Kranzbühler commented on the procedural and legal inadequacies at Nuremberg.

=== Procedural critique ===
Kranzbühler believed that the prosecutors and judges made it very difficult for the defense to efficiently represent the defendants at Nuremberg.

Kranzbühler noted that while the prosecution had access to all of the confiscated German archives, the defense counsel only had access to the documents the prosecution introduced into evidence. In other words, the defense counsel's access to the confiscated archives was completely barred. Furthermore, the defense was only allowed to use German material, meaning that all foreign archives remained strictly barred from review or submission. For instance, the German-Soviet Treaty of 1939 could not be directly submitted as evidence to the Tribunal because it was a foreign archive. Instead, the defense had to prove its existence through numerous affidavits that were subject to continued objections on the part of the Russian prosecutors. Although, in this instance, the defense reached its ultimate intent, they had to spend time calculating ways in which such foreign evidence could be introduced.

Furthermore, even though the only archives that could be used were German, the defense was constantly flooded with the English version of those documents. When the defense demanded that these documents be made available to them in the German original before being submitted to the court, the prosecutors and judges refused. According to Kranzbühler, in an in camera meeting regarding this issue, Chief Prosecutor Robert Jackson refused to submit the original documents because it would be contrary to the purpose of the Nuremberg Trials. To the surprise of Kranzbühler, Jackson argued that the purpose of the trials was not to bring criminals to conviction, but rather to (1) prove to the world that the German conduct of war had been illegal and unjustified just as the U.S. had alleged throughout the world by her propaganda before her entry into the war; and to (2) make it clear to the German people that it deserved severe punishment, and to prepare them for such punishment. Kranzbühler believed that Jackson's in camera statement was representative of the reality of the trial, i. e. that the political aspects of the trial would prevail over the aspects of procedural fairness. Kranzbühler believed that this extended to the substantive legal aspects of the trials as well.

=== Legal critique ===
Kranzbühler's intention was not to "brand as an injustice" all the rules, doctrines, or practices of international law that existed at Nuremberg that did not exist prior to Nuremberg, but rather, to question whether the new rules, doctrines, and procedures set forth at Nuremberg would be suitable precedents for future courts to rely upon. With this in mind, Kranzbühler discussed the most notable legal issues at Nuremberg.

==== London Charter Laws ====
Kranzbühler believed that the London Charter laws, which applied before the International Military Tribunal at Nuremberg and were based on discussions between the four occupying powers in August 1945, were merely conceived to bring certain defendants to prosecution and conviction that could not have been tried under any existing international practice. Kranzbühler noted that the Continental participants had doubts about including the concept of conspiracy in the rules of the London Charter, that is, until they were informed that without such a concept a man such as Hjalmar Schacht, a German financial expert and Minister of Economics, could not be convicted. Kranzbühler believed it to be an injustice that the laws at Nuremberg were constructed not around what is legally correct, but what would be sufficient to convict those they wanted to punish.

Furthermore, in reference to the creation of the London Charter, Kranzbühler was puzzled that among the legislators of the Charter were Nuremberg prosecutors and judges including: U.S. Chief Prosecutor Robert Jackson, U.K. Chief Prosecutor Sir David Maxwell, and Russian Judge Iona Nikitchenko. According to Kranzbühler, "Since the French Revolution it has been considered a basic requirement of true administration of justice that the separation of powers is strictly observed in legal proceedings" and given this overlapping, the "doctrine of separation of powers was grossly neglected."

==== Subordinate responsibility ====
Particularly in reference to the 12 trials before the American Courts, Kranzbühler questioned the legitimacy of attributing responsibility to subordinates. According to Kranzbühler, until 1945 it was generally recognized that the military order of a superior justified the acts of subordinates, unless the subordinate realized the intention to commit a felony or other crime by means of such order. This was the case both in the German Military Penal Code and in Anglo-American Military Penal Law. The Nuremberg courts, however, took the position that superior orders could never constitute a justification and at most could amount to a mitigating factor. Kranzbühler believed that such a finding, though seemingly reasonable, is unrealistic because the subordinate would be burdened with a responsibility he could not bear, and in the military context, is not even allowed to bear. Kranzbühler recognizes that attributing responsibility to a subordinate in some cases is justified (such as the case when the subordinate is a high-ranking official), but not all. As a result, Kranzbühler felt that the Nuremberg Trials, particularly the trials before the American courts, likely did not set a justified precedent in respect to criminalizing the acts of subordinates.

==== Kranzbühler’s analysis of the International Military Tribunal Indictments ====
Unlike many other critics of the Nuremberg Trials, Kranzbühler did not argue that the substantive indictments made at Nuremberg were unjustified because the extension of the punishable acts was expanded by introducing new laws that had not existed prior to Nuremberg. Rather, in defining the legitimacy of the indictments, Kranzbühler found it more useful to evaluate the laws and their likelihood of being reapplied by future courts, regardless of whether they were present prior to Nuremberg.

1. In respect to the then new concept of conspiracy for the accomplishment of crime against peace, Kranzbühler did not take a clear position – perhaps because Dönitz's focus was on the military's tactics in applying the plans of his superiors, not on the actual planning.

2. In respect to the then new concept of waging a war of aggression, Kranzbühler argued that there is an inherent difficulty in assigning and defining blame for crime of aggressive war when such a term is not properly defined; and questioned how a court could render such a judgment without bias toward the victor. Kranzbühler doubted that the legal concept of a war of aggression could be applied in the future when the term is so difficult to define. Later international legislation suggests that Kranzbühler was correct. For instance, The Rome Statute of the International Criminal Court, which entered into force on 1 July 2002, provides for the court to have jurisdiction over the crime of aggression, but only once a definition for that crime has been adopted by an Amendment to the Statute. Even by 2002, the legislators had difficulty assigning a particular definition. Kranzbühler concluded that the finding of a war of aggression is a political problem – that a court is unlikely to declare the victor

3. In respect to crimes against the laws of war, Kranzbühler argued that the Nuremberg Tribunal expanded the scope and definition of a war crime. Kranzbühler argued during and after the Nuremberg Trials that the Nuremberg Trials expanded the scope of war crimes by prosecuting generals on account of the military preparation of war, lawyers on account of their participation in certain legislation, and industrialists on their participation in the war economy. Kranzbühler doubted that such a broad expansion of the previous definition of a war crime (which was historically confined mainly to violations of the rules of war by members of the armed forces and armed hostilities by non-members) would not have authority in the future. Furthermore, Kranzbühler questioned the manner in which it was applied at Nuremberg – particularly that his client, Grand Admiral Dönitz, was charged with crimes against the laws of war, yet U.S. Admiral Nimitz (who did similar acts as Dönitz) was never charged.

4. In respect to the then new concept of a crime against humanity, Kranzbühler agreed that such a crime was a necessary development and should be accepted (not in how it has been employed, but in its basic concept). Kranzbühler believed that a crime against humanity, in its basic concept, is a crime of the government, and thus a prosecution should only be against the government – that is – against the policy making level. Kranzbühler argued that it is not a crime that should involve subordinates. Nevertheless, Kranzbühler found that the concept of a crime against humanity, with the increasing danger of states abusing their powers in a grave manner, such a concept is justified and can and should create a precedent.

== Kranzbühler’s appreciation of the Nuremberg Trials ==
Despite all of the negative aspects of Nuremberg, Kranzbühler did note the importance and significance of the Nuremberg Trials. According to Kranzbühler, the British would have summarily shot the principal leaders of the Third Reich. The Russians would have adhered to the same principle, only multiplying the victims. But the United States insisted that expiation be sought and found by judicial proceedings. In this regard, Kranzbühler concluded that the International Military Tribunal proceedings discharged the tensions between the victors and the vanquished.

== Later years ==
Following World War II, Kranzbühler represented many German industrialists, including Friedrich Karl Flick, Alfried Krupp, and Hermann Röchling, against the complaints of former forced laborers before and during the war before American and French courts. Kranzbühler remained a practicing attorney focusing on corporate law – addressing problems of corporate confiscation of private property and decartelization. He served for many years on the board of directors for Rheinmetall, a German automotive components and defense equipment company.

In 1969–70, Kranzbühler represented the former Freikorps lieutenant Hermann Souchon when he sued the Süddeutscher Rundfunk, after a documentary had been broadcast identifying Souchon as Rosa Luxemburg's murderer. The TV station had to retract its statement of Souchon's guilt.

Kranzbühler died in Tegernsee on 9 August 2004. He was buried in the naval uniform he wore at Nuremberg along with his briefcase.
