= Horst von Pflugk-Harttung =

German intelligence officer and spy

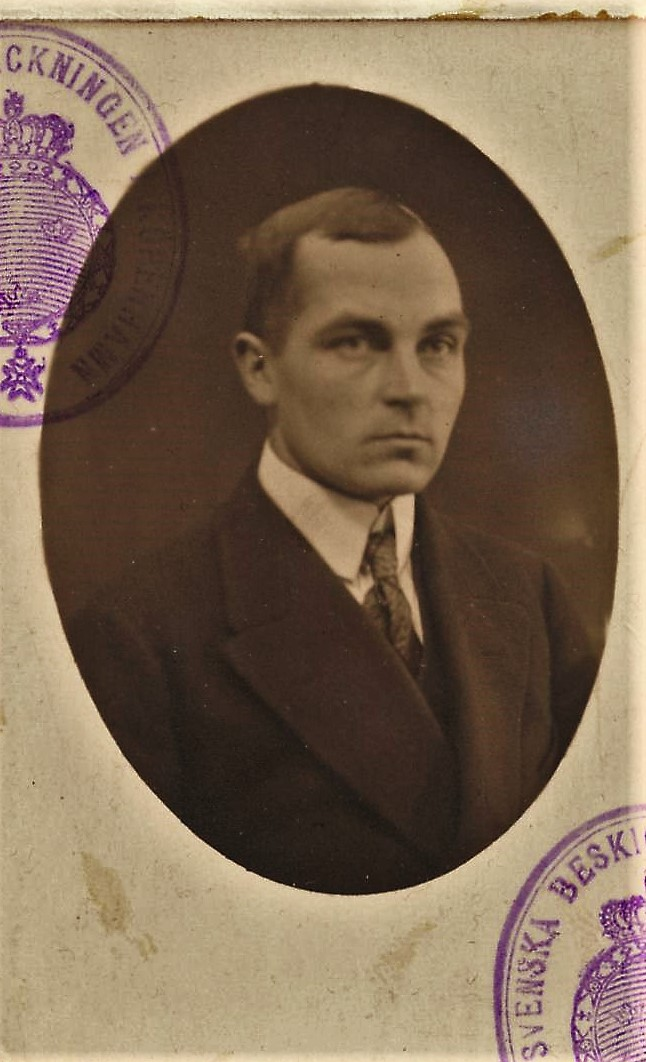
Horst von Pflugk-Harttung Portrait (1919)

Horst Gustav Friedrich von Pflugk-Harttung (17 June 1889 – 9 March 1967) (alternate spelling Pflug-Hartnung) was a German intelligence officer and spy.

== Weimar Germany ==
After serving in the army during World War I, Pflugk-Harttung had become a member of the Freikorps, the paramilitary organizations that sprang up around Germany as soldiers returned home from the war. Freikorps were the primary paramilitary groups active during the Weimar Republic. Many German veterans felt disconnected from civilian life and joined a Freikorps for the stability of a military structure. Kapitänleutnant Pflugk-Harttung and his brother, Heinz, both volunteered to join a Freikorps. The German volunteer movement was opposed to the communist Spartacus League. During this period, he became friends with the future head of the Abwehr, Wilhelm Canaris. In 1919, Pflugk-Harttung and his brother were accused of direct involvement in the murder of the Spartacist Karl Liebknecht. Both men were acquitted, but many thought them guilty. Pflugk-Harttung would secretly admit his guilt to Ernst von Weizsäcker. Later in 1919, Pflugh-Harttung fled Weimar Germany for Denmark following his trial. Heinz died in an accidental grenade explosion in 1920.

== Sweden ==
In 1931, Pflugk-Harttung was recorded as helping coordinate fascist groups and organisations in Sweden. The Swedish authorities expelled Pflugk-Harttung after they discovered that he had been illegally importing armaments into Sweden for the Munckska kåren. Pflugk-Harttung later went to Norway on a similar mission, but he was soon asked to leave.

== Denmark ==
By 1933, Pflugk-Harttung was working for German intelligence in Denmark. As a cover, he worked as a correspondent for Berliner Böersen-Zeitung, a Reich War Ministry newspaper. His duties included keeping a close eye on German exiles in Denmark; the Danish police cooperated with him via intermediaries. Along with other postgraduates of Gestapo spy schools, Pflugk-Harttung established a spy ring that operated secret broadcasting stations and engaged in nautical and hydrographical research. It drew up maps, charts, graphs and complicated mathematical tables of data which required highly skilled technicians to understand. They communicated with complex code systems that frequently changed. The outlay for such an extensive apparatus was justified as part of the Third Reich's preparation for war against major countries. Pflugk-Harttung's network watched and reported on British shipping movements into and out of the Baltic Sea. In 1938, information revealed by Ernst Wollweber to the Danish authorities and further investigations by the police led to the arrest of Pflugk-Harttung, eight other Germans, and three Danes who were charged with operating as spies in Copenhagen. Investigations proved that the spy ring had been involved in the sabotage and sinking of Spanish trawlers on behalf of General Francisco Franco and his Nationalist Navy, which was operating from German ports. Their acts included the use of the spying apparatus to shell and sink the SS Cantabria off the Norfolk coast by the Spanish Nationalist auxiliary cruiser Nadir.

Pflugk-Harttung was sentenced to 18 months in prison, but he was released after a few months due to pressure from the German government. After his release from prison, Pflugk-Harttung was deported and became one of the leading German intelligence chiefs in Denmark.

== World War II ==
In 1944, Pflugk-Harttung was head of the Marinesonderdienst in Bordeaux. He was arrested by US forces and taken to Arizona as a prisoner of war. He was held in American then British custody until November 1947, when he was returned to Germany.
