= Great Hollow Road Stone Arch Bridge =

- U.S. National Register of Historic Places
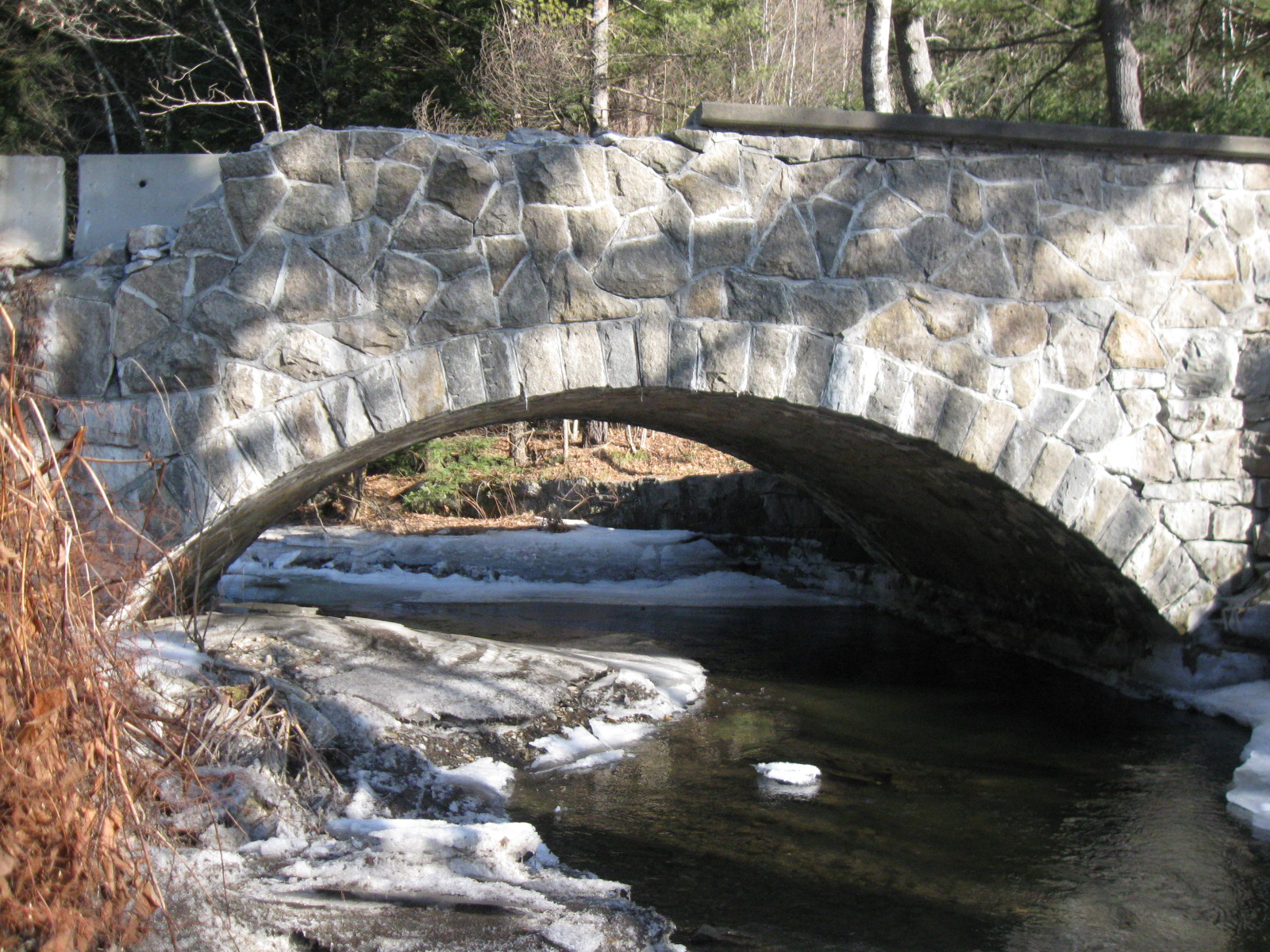

- Location within New Hampshire Location within the United States
- Location: Great Hollow Rd., over Mink Brook, approximately 100 ft. N of jct. with Smith Ln., Hanover, New Hampshire
- Coordinates: 43°41′13″N 72°14′0″W
- Area: less than one acre
- Built: 1914
- Architect: Town of Hanover
- NRHP reference No.: 97000372
- Added to NRHP: May 12, 1997

The Great Hollow Road Stone Arch Bridge (also known as the Etna Stone Bridge) is a historic stone arch bridge carrying Great Hollow Road over Mink Brook in Hanover, New Hampshire. Built by the town in 1914, it is one of two stone bridges in the town, and a finely crafted and little-altered example of stone masonry of the period. The bridge was listed on the National Register of Historic Places in 1997.

== Description and history ==
The Great Hollow Road Stone Arch Bridge is located in a rural area of central Hanover, carrying Great Hollow Road over Mink Brook a short way south of its junction with Etna and Greensboro roads. It is 33 feet (10 m) long and 24.5 feet (7.5 m) wide, with a road width of 21.5 feet (6.6 m). The vault of the stone arch is 24.5 feet in width and 28 feet (8.5 m) long, and is constructed of mortared rubble stone lined with ashlar voussoirs. The stonework has been topped by six inches of concrete, which is believed to be a later addition intended to protect the stonework from the elements. The roadway is flanked by low stone guard walls.

The bridge was built in 1914, at a time when the town was seeking to replace aging wooden bridges with new bridges that would better withstand the increased loads of the automobile era. This crossing formed an important link in the main transport route connecting downtown Hanover and the village of Etna, which is a short way to the northeast, to Lebanon to the south. Stone for this bridge and another on West Lebanon Road was donated by Dartmouth College; it came from the stone foundation of a building on North Main Street that was demolished. The West Lebanon Road bridge was demolished when that road was straightened and realigned to handle a higher volume of traffic; this bridge escaped that fate due to changing traffic patterns, which make the route no longer as important as it was at the time of its construction.

== See also ==
- National Register of Historic Places listings in Grafton County, New Hampshire
- List of bridges on the National Register of Historic Places in New Hampshire
