= Martin Philip =

American baker, author and banjoist

- Born: Martin Rainey Philip; Arkansas
- Occupation: Bread maker
- Years active: 2006-present
- Spouse: Julie Ness
- Children: 3
- Website: breadwright.com

Martin Rainey Philip is an American baker, author, and banjoist. He is the baking ambassador at King Arthur Baking Company in Norwich, Vermont.

== Early life and education ==
Philip was born in the Ozark Mountains area of Arkansas. He grew up in Fayetteville, Arkansas.

In 1992, Philip received a Bachelor of Music in performance (voice) from the Oberlin College's conservatory for classical music.

== Career ==
After college, Philip lived in San Francisco until 2000. After moving to New York City to pursue work in opera, Philip worked in the operations division of the investment bank Credit Suisse until 2006. He attended classes at Art Students League of New York for drawing. Philip wrote about how being in the City during September 11 attacks initiated a career change.

In May 2006, after a long period of home baking, Philip moved to Vermont to work at King Arthur Flour in Norwich, Vermont. He was hired by King Arthur head baker Jeffrey Hamelman. He is now head bread baker.

In 2017, Philip wrote the book Breaking Bread: A Baker's Journey Home in 75 Recipes. He wrote the book – part memoir, part cook book – in Hanover Town Library in Hanover, New Hampshire and during a 2016 residency at the MacDowell Colony in Peterborough, New Hampshire. The authors Sarah Stewart Taylor and Jodi Picoult provided guidance and Picoult connected him to a book agent.

As part of the book release, Philip did a week long tour of the Ozark region where he grew up, that he called Baker Maker Roadshow and Biscuits for Strangers, where he rode his bike with his banjo and baking ingredients as a way to connect with the community where he grew up.

In 2020, during the COVID-19 pandemic where self-isolation and physical distancing increased the popularity of home bread baking, Philip shared regular baking stories on Instagram, often with his son as an assistant and his daughter behind the camera.

== Personal life ==
Philip is married to Julie Ness. They have three children and live in White River Junction, Vermont.

Philip plays the banjo, typically clawhammer-style. He is also an avid trail runner in the Vermont woods near his home.

== Honors ==
- 2013: Coupe du Monde de la Boulangerie (Paris, France)
- 2013: SIGEP Golden Cup (Rimini, Italy), Team USA finalist
- 2016: MacDowell Colony, fellow
- 2017: New England Book Festival, Grand Prize
- 2018: Vermont College of Fine Arts, Vermont Book Award
- 2018: New York Book Industry Guild, best cookbook of 2018

== Selected works and publications ==
- Philip, Martin; Reed, Julia A. (photography by) (2017). Breaking Bread: A Baker's Journey Home in 75 Recipes. New York, NY: Harper Wave, HaperCollinsPublishers. ISBN 978-0-062-44793-7. OCLC 1132370646.
- Philip, Martin (26 October 2017). "I Was Too Busy to Run. So I Started a Streak, and It Changed Everything". Runner's World.
- Philip, Martin (13 September 2018). "We slept in that day". Medium.
- Philip, Martin (6 April 2020). "Don't be a bread hostage". King Arthur Flour.
