= Breaking bread =

Breaking bread may refer to:

== Christianity ==
- The Christian Eucharist
  - Fraction (religion), the practice of breaking the sacramental bread during the Eucharist
- Road to Emmaus appearance, a post-resurrection appearance of Jesus described in the Gospel of Luke

== Entertainment ==
- Breakin' Bread, a 1974 album by The J.B.'s
- "Breaking Bread", a song by Del Amitri from the 1985 album Del Amitri
- "Breaking Bread", a song by Johnny Cash from the 2003 album Unearthed
- "Breaking Bread", a song by Matmos from the 2019 album Plastic Anniversary
- "Breaking Bread", an episode of the TV series Pie in the Sky
- "Breaking Bread", an episode of the TV series Touched by an Angel
- "Breaking Bread", an episode of the TV series Traffic Light
- Breaking Bread, a documentary series hosted by Tony Shalhoub

== Other uses ==
- Fractio Panis (Breaking of the Bread), a fresco in the Catacomb of Priscilla, Rome
- Breaking Bread: A Baker's Journey Home in 75 Recipes, a 2017 book by baker Martin Philip

== See also ==
- Kagami biraki, a ritual in Japanese culture
