= The Russian Revolution (pamphlet) =

1918 pamphlet by Rosa Luxemburg

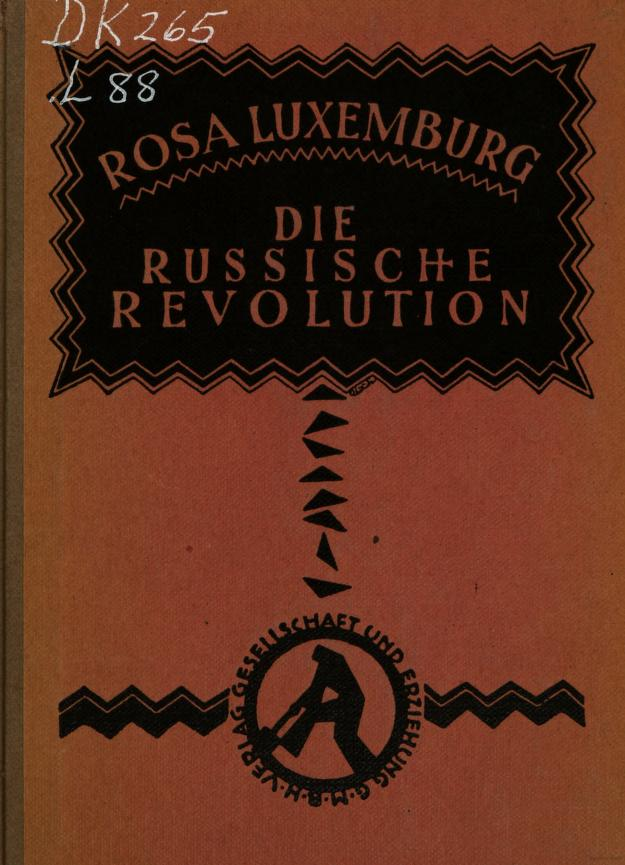
- Cover of the first edition
- Author: Rosa Luxemburg
- Original title: Die Russische Revolution: Eine kritische Würdigung
- Language: German
- Subject: Russian Revolution, Leninism, Marxism
- Genre: Political pamphlet
- Publisher: Gesellschaft und Erziehung
- Publication date: 1922
- Publication place: German Empire
- The work was written in 1918, and edited and published posthumously by Paul Levi.

The Russian Revolution: A Critical Appreciation (German: Die Russische Revolution. Eine kritische Würdigung) is a pamphlet written in 1918 by the Marxist theorist Rosa Luxemburg. It was written in prison while Luxemburg was serving a sentence in Breslau, Germany, and published posthumously in 1922 by her former comrade Paul Levi. Luxemburg discusses the 1917 February and October revolutions in Russia. The work is a critique of the policies of the Bolsheviks following the October Revolution, particularly their dissolution of the Russian Constituent Assembly.

The pamphlet's central argument concerns the dialectic between spontaneity and consciousness in revolutionary theory, a key point of contention between Luxemburg and Vladimir Lenin. While praising the Bolsheviks for seizing power, Luxemburg criticizes their agrarian policies, their stance on the self-determination of nations, and their suppression of democratic institutions such as the Constituent Assembly. She argues that these actions risked undermining the socialist goals of the revolution.

Upon its publication, the pamphlet became highly controversial within the international communist movement. A major debate erupted over whether Luxemburg had later changed her mind or recanted the views expressed in the text, with figures like Clara Zetkin arguing she had, while Levi used the pamphlet to criticize the direction of the Bolshevik party. The text was later influential in the Cold War as an anti-Leninist document and experienced a revival of interest among European leftists in the 1960s and 1970s seeking alternatives to Soviet Marxism.

== Background and writing ==
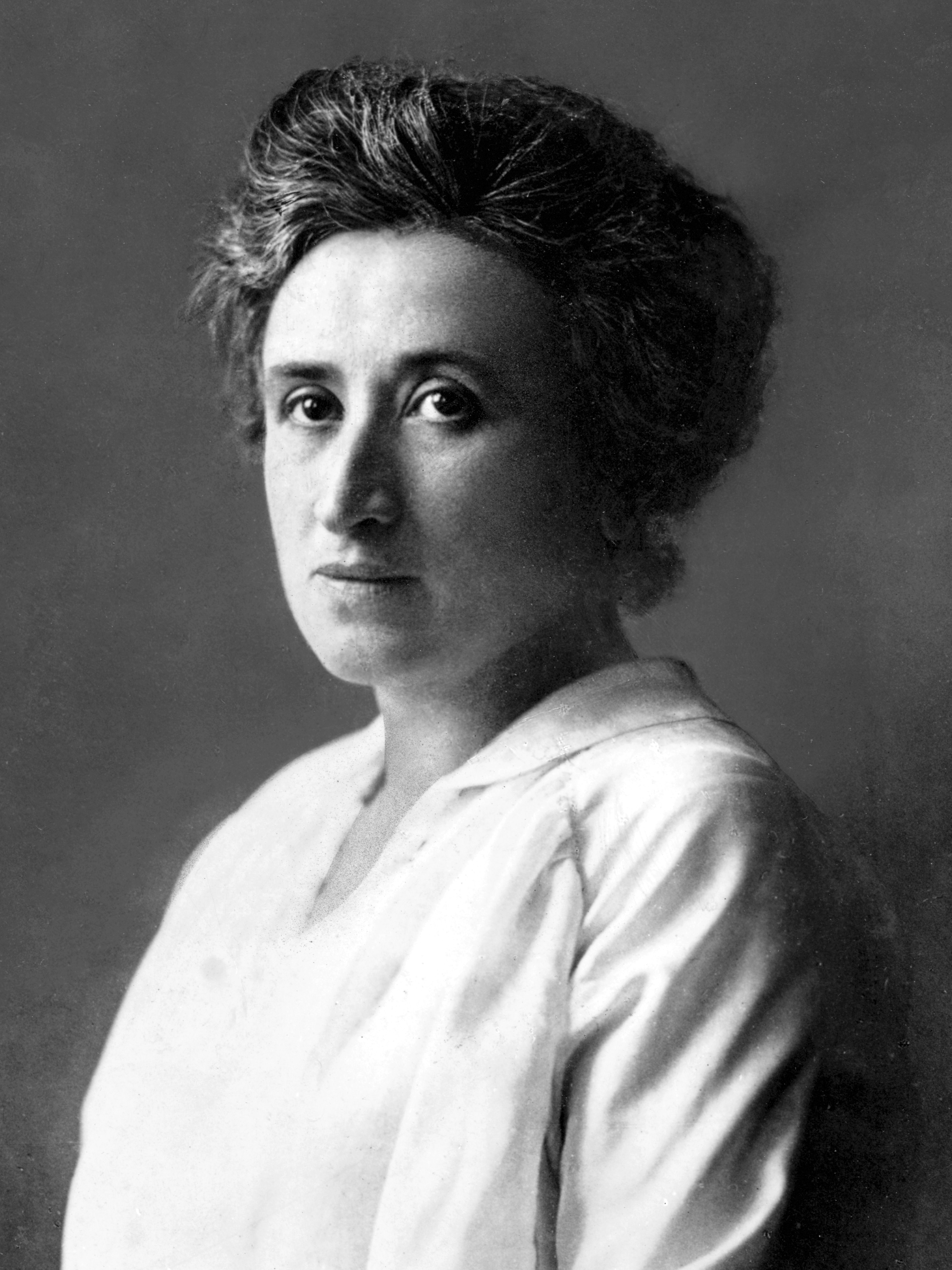
Rosa Luxemburg

From the 1900s through the 1920s, Rosa Luxemburg was a major figure in the international revolutionary movement, and her writings were central to several critical controversies among European Marxists. She was initially ecstatic about the revolutionary events in Russia, describing them as an "elixir of life" and the potential salvation of Europe. However, she grew increasingly disillusioned with the Bolsheviks' post-revolutionary administration.

Luxemburg began writing the pamphlet in Breslau prison in September–October 1918. It was never finished. Prior to this, in the summer of 1918, she had smuggled out of prison a series of articles titled "The Russian Tragedy", which were highly critical of the Treaty of Brest-Litovsk. The articles were submitted to the illegal Spartacist newspaper Spartakus Briefe, where Paul Levi was an editor. The editors—Levi, Ernst Meyer, and Eugen Leviné—published the first article reluctantly with a cautionary note, but refused to publish a second, sharper article that accused the Bolsheviks of considering an alliance with German imperialism. Levi visited Luxemburg in prison to persuade her to stop publishing such attacks, arguing they would be misused by enemies of the revolution. After a long discussion, she agreed, but the conversation convinced her of the need to clarify her position, and she started the longer work which became The Russian Revolution. In a letter accompanying a draft she sent to Levi in September 1918 through an intermediary, she wrote, "I am writing this pamphlet for you and if I can convince you then the effort isn't wasted".

== Publication history ==
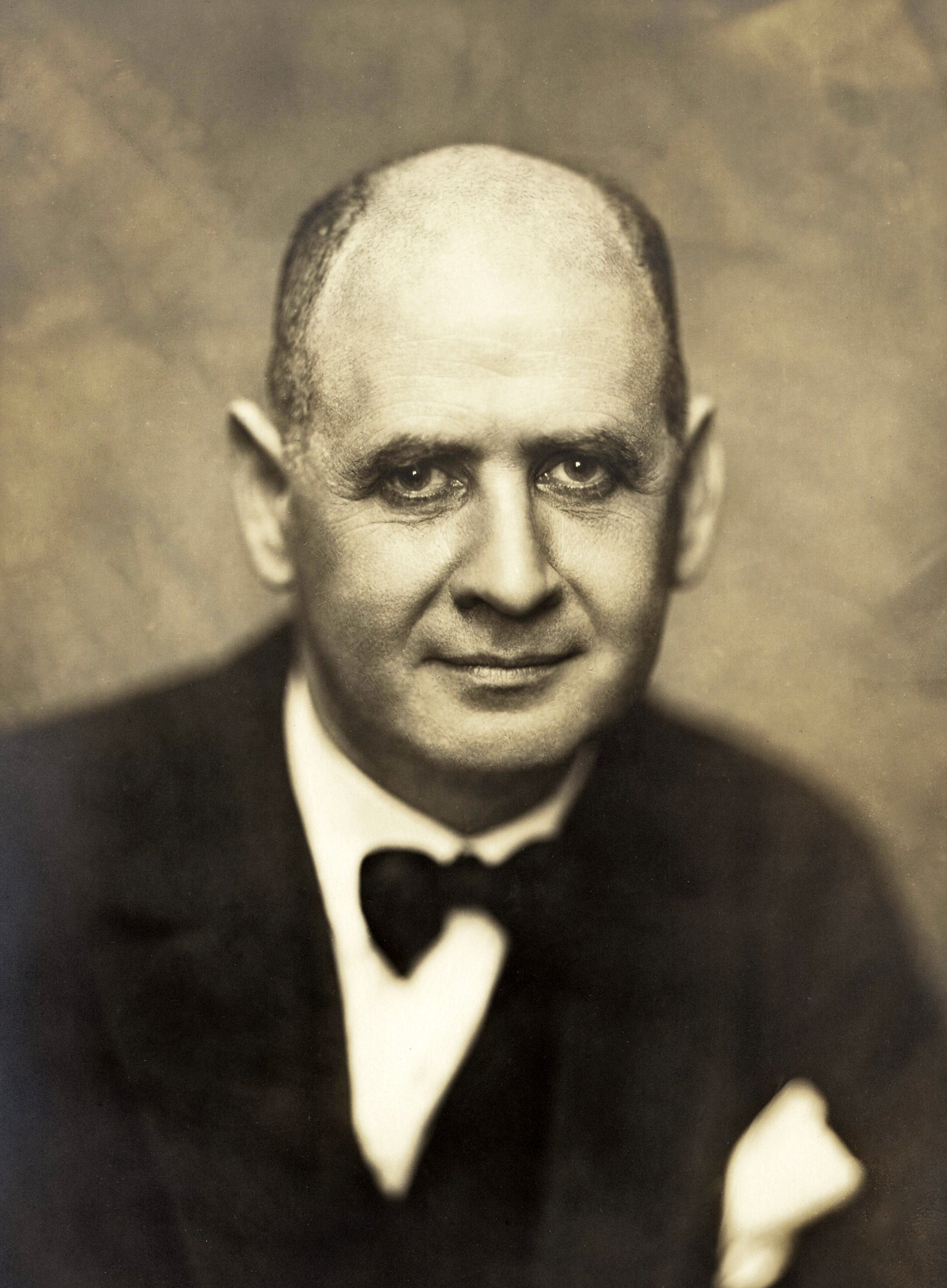
Paul Levi

The pamphlet was published posthumously by Paul Levi in 1922, three years after Luxemburg's murder. The text was controversial even before it appeared, as it was seen as an attack on Vladimir Lenin's policies. According to Levi, authorities in Moscow, possibly Lenin himself, pressured him to publicly state that Luxemburg had changed her mind. Biographer Elżbieta Ettinger claimed, though without substantiation, that in the fall of 1921 Clara Zetkin was instructed by Lenin in Moscow to burn the manuscript.

Zetkin later recounted that after Luxemburg's death, she and Levi had gone to her apartment and found her papers scattered after a police raid. They attempted to assemble a coherent manuscript from the fragmentary exercise books they found. Luxemburg's long-term lover and party activist, Leo Jogiches, was "decisively against publication" and asked Zetkin to burn the books, but she could not bring herself to do so, and the manuscript ended up with Levi.

The version of the text used by both Levi and Zetkin in their subsequent arguments was incomplete. In 1928, Felix Weil, a German-Argentine Marxist who funded the Institute for Social Research, revealed that Luxemburg's drafts had been entrusted to a comrade for safekeeping in January 1919 and subsequently forgotten. A bundle of papers found in Berlin proved to be the lost manuscript of The Russian Revolution. This manuscript contained 108 pages, 87 of which corresponded to the version Levi had published. Weil could not determine if the remainder was intended to be part of the text, nor whether the original was substantially different in its import from the published version. The differences he noted were minor, such as the use of "Klassenwerke" (class works) instead of "Klassenverhältnisse" (class relations).

== Content ==
The pamphlet presents an ambiguous evaluation of the Russian Revolution, containing both praise for Lenin and the Bolsheviks and sharp criticisms of their policies. Biographer J. P. Nettl suggests the work is less a construction of a new theory than a "highly deductive" application of Luxemburg's existing "well-established, systematic conclusions to a new set of facts." Luxemburg lauded the Bolsheviks for their revolutionary courage and for being the only party to grasp the mandate of a truly revolutionary party. She celebrated their seizure of power as an act that saved "not only the Russian Revolution; it was also the salvation of the honor of international socialism". Later commentators have noted that anti-Bolshevik interpretations of the pamphlet often ignore this section of praise.

However, she presented three main criticisms of their post-revolutionary policies. Firstly, she opposed the Bolsheviks' agrarian policy of seizing and distributing land, arguing this was "bound to create a powerful mass of new property owners, potential foes of the Revolution". Secondly, as a firm internationalist, she was against their policy on the right of nations to self-determination, which she believed "enhanced nationalistic sentiments, thus undermining the unification of the proletariat". Luxemburg's biographer Paul Frölich argued that her criticisms on these points were "less persuasive", noting that had the Bolsheviks opposed the peasants' demand for land, "they would need to make a war against the peasants. That would be the end of the revolution."

Her third and most prominent criticism, which attracted the most polemical attention, was directed at the Bolsheviks' dissolution of the elected Russian Constituent Assembly in January 1918. The Bolsheviks dissolved the assembly after it had met for only thirteen hours. She argued that this action, along with the abolition of universal suffrage and the freedoms of press, association, and assembly, "deprived the masses of a fundamental democratic institution" and prevented the development of a "healthy public life". She acknowledged that these measures were born of expediency due to the war and economic conditions but cautioned against institutionalizing them: "The danger begins only when they make a virtue of necessity and want to freeze into a complete theoretical system all the tactics forced upon them by these fatal circumstances". In a frequently cited passage, she wrote:

Freedom only for the supporters of the government, only for the members of one party—however numerous they may be—is no freedom at all. Freedom is always and exclusively freedom for the one who thinks differently.

For Luxemburg, "the curtailment of democracy becomes a cure that is worse than the disease". She argued that "Socialist democracy is not something which begins only in the promised land after the foundations of socialist economy are created... It does not come as some sort of Christmas present for the worthy people who, in the interim, have loyally supported a handful of socialist dictators." Instead, she advocated for what she termed a "dictatorship of the class, not of a party or of a clique", meaning a dictatorship built "on the basis of the most active, unlimited participation of the mass of the people, of unlimited democracy." She elaborated in a prophetic warning against the rise of a new bureaucracy:

Without general elections, without unrestricted freedom of press and assembly, without a free struggle of opinion, life dies out in every public institution, becomes a mere semblance of life, in which only the bureaucracy remains as the active element. Public life gradually falls asleep, a few dozen party leaders of inexhaustible energy and boundless experience direct and rule. Among them, in reality only a dozen outstanding heads do the leading and an elite of the working class is invited from time to time to meetings where they are to applaud the speeches of the leaders, and to approve proposed resolutions unanimously—at bottom, then, a clique affair—a dictatorship, to be sure, not the dictatorship of the proletariat, however, but only the dictatorship of a handful of politicians.

== Controversy and reception ==
The pamphlet's publication sparked a bitter controversy among German Marxists over whether Luxemburg truly stood by her criticisms of the Bolsheviks. The debate centered on whether she had changed her mind after her release from prison. According to J. P. Nettl, the subsequent claims and counterclaims caused "the problem of Rosa's attitude to the Russian revolution" to become "a central issue" in the German Communist movement.

=== The Levi–Zetkin debate ===
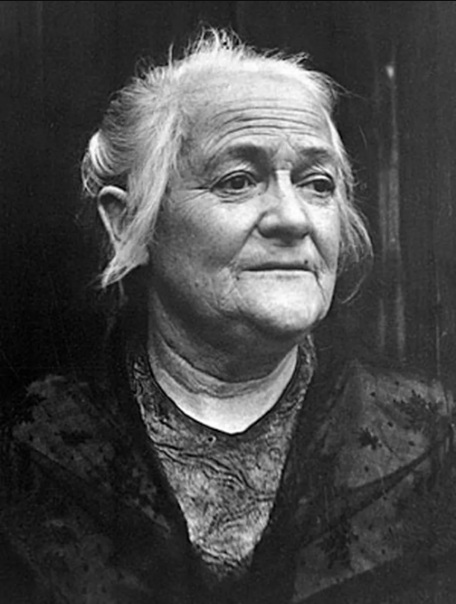
Clara Zetkin

In a bid for damage control, Luxemburg's long-standing comrade Clara Zetkin argued in her 1922 book Um Rosa Luxemburgs Stellung zur russischen Revolution that Luxemburg had recanted her views. Zetkin claimed that while in prison, Luxemburg was cut off from information and grew concerned, but upon her release in November 1918 and her involvement in the Spartacist uprising, she changed her mind about Leninist centralism. Zetkin claimed to have this information from Leo Jogiches, but as he was already dead, there was no one to verify her statement. To support her argument, Zetkin cited a series of unattributed articles from the communist newspaper Die Rote Fahne which praised Lenin's actions. Zetkin presented these as Luxemburg's "last and final testament", arguing that as a powerful force behind the paper, nothing could have been published without her consent. Later scholars have noted that "a consistent democratic thread in Luxemburg's work refutes Zetkin's argument". Zetkin framed the debate in Manichaean terms, idealizing Luxemburg as "the sacred glowing heart of the proletariat" while portraying Paul Levi as a "desert[er] from the camp of the proletarian revolution" who had misrepresented her views to advance his "own barbed armed conflict against the Bolsheviks".

Levi's publication of the pamphlet was not an innocent gesture. He provided a 63-page introduction, longer than the text itself, which he used as an indirect form of self-justification after his recent expulsion from the Communist Party of Germany (KPD) for publicly criticizing its tactics during the failed March Action of 1921. Levi prepared the pamphlet for publication after the 1921 Kronstadt rebellion, a revolt against the Bolshevik regime. At a time when he had his own "irreconcilable differences with Lenin," he was accused of using the pamphlet to "square his personal accounts." He argued that Luxemburg's criticisms foreshadowed the "betrayal" of the revolution in early 1921, citing the suppression of the Kronstadt rebellion and the announcement of the New Economic Policy.

=== Evidence for a change of mind ===
Evidence from Luxemburg's comrades suggests that her views on the Bolsheviks did shift after her release from prison, though the extent of this change is debated. In late November 1918, Adolf Warski wrote to her from Warsaw asking for her position on Bolshevism. She responded:

I shared all your reservations and doubts, but have dropped them in the most important questions, and in others I never went as far as you. Terrorism is evidence of grave internal weakness, but it is directed against internal enemies, who ... get support and encouragement from foreign capitalists outside Russia. Once the European revolution comes, the Russian counter-revolutionaries lose not only this support, but—what is more important—they must lose all courage. Bolshevik terror is above all the expression of the weakness of the European proletariat.

According to Nettl, this indicates a shift away from criticizing the Bolsheviks' actions as "false tactics" and toward seeing them as a logical consequence of the "fatal logic of the objective situation"—namely, the failure of the German revolution. However, he argues against the idea of a full recantation, noting that her core criticisms remained. He suggests that her "change of mind" was less a revision of her theories and more a practical unwillingness to "grub around in the Russian past" while the German revolution was underway. She pointed out in her speech to the founding congress of the KPD that her opposition to a Constituent Assembly in Germany was based on the specific German context, making a direct comparison with Russia in November 1917 incorrect.

=== Later interpretations ===
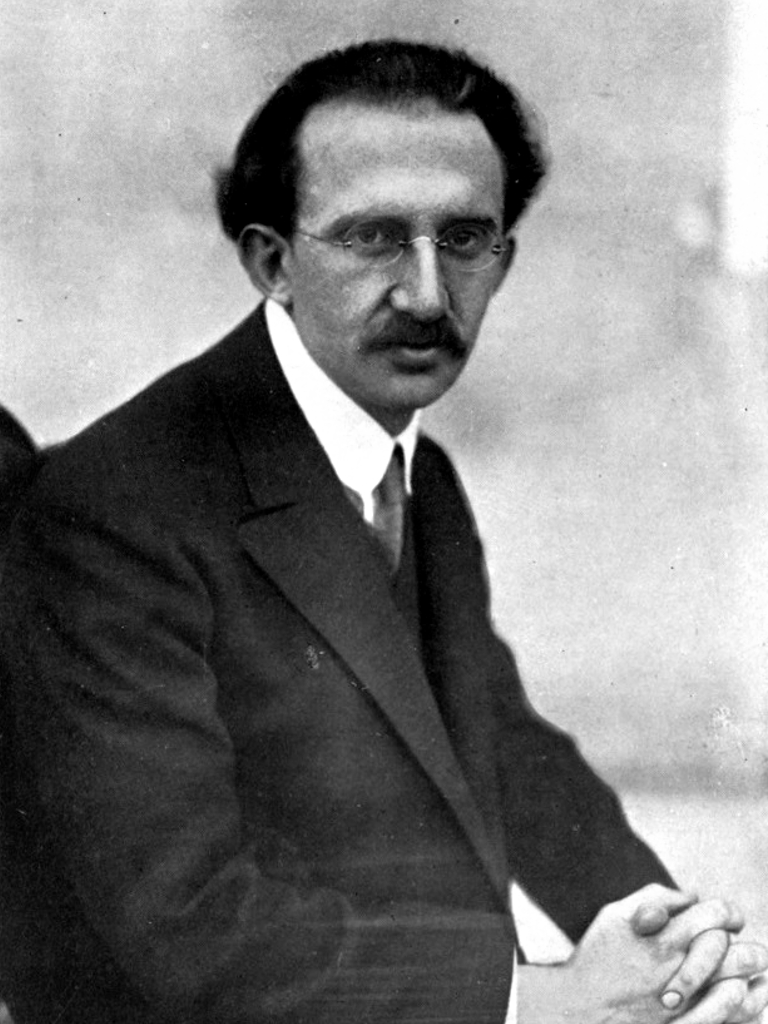
Georg Lukács criticized Luxemburg's emphasis on spontaneity in History and Class Consciousness (1923).

Georg Lukács devoted two chapters to Luxemburg in his influential 1923 book History and Class Consciousness. In the second chapter, dated 1922 and written after the pamphlet's publication, Lukács critiqued Luxemburg's position. He argued that she had a "false view of the character of the proletarian revolution" due to an "overestimation" of the role of spontaneity. He contended that her analysis was "undialectical" and underplayed the role of the party, leading to her flawed attitude toward the Constituent Assembly. His critique was also an indirect polemic against Paul Levi, who had published the work and was opposed to the March Action which Lukács had supported.

In 1931, Joseph Stalin, in a "papal bull" titled "Some Questions Concerning the History of Bolshevism," attacked Luxemburg's ideas. He lumped her with Leon Trotsky and the Mensheviks, accusing her of composing a "utopian and semi-Menshevik scheme of permanent revolution". Katerina Clark suggests that Stalin's need to discredit Luxemburg over a decade after her death demonstrates her continuing prominence in communist ideological debates and the sensitivity of the issue of centralism as Stalin's regime grew more hierarchical.

Trotsky defended Luxemburg against Stalin’s criticisms. In 1932, he argued that Stalin was misrepresenting Luxemburg's positions and highlighted Lenin's own acknowledgement that "Rosa Luxemburg was right" in her early critiques of Karl Kautsky's opportunism. As Trotsky struggled against the growing bureaucracy of the Stalinist regime in the 1930s, he "rediscovered" Luxemburg, seeing in her work an early recognition of the dangers of an "ossified party machinery". He saw a parallel between the reformist bureaucracy she had fought in the German Social Democratic Party and the Stalinized Communist parties of his own time.

During the Cold War, the pamphlet was often promoted as a definitive anti-Leninist text. The translation by Bertram D. Wolfe, published in 1947 and 1961, served as the main English-language version for many years. Wolfe's introduction framed the text as an "almost 'clairvoyant indictment of the Bolsheviks'", which became the standard Cold War reading of the work. The political theorist Hannah Arendt, in a 1966 essay, also engaged with Luxemburg's work. Arendt claimed that Luxemburg "was not an orthodox Marxist, so little orthodox indeed that it might be doubted that she was a Marxist at all". Arendt focused on the significance of Luxemburg's Polish "peer group" as distinct from other revolutionary traditions, and saw her analysis of the Russian Revolution as vindicated.

== Themes and legacy ==
The furor over The Russian Revolution stemmed from its engagement with the central dilemma of Marxist–Leninist revolutionary theory: the balance between "spontaneity" (the independent action of the masses) and "consciousness" (action guided by a disciplined revolutionary vanguard). Lenin, particularly in What Is to Be Done? (1902), privileged "consciousness". He argued that the working class, left to its own devices, could only develop a "trade union consciousness" and required guidance from a vanguard party of experienced revolutionaries to achieve political change. Luxemburg, in contrast, had a predilection for "spontaneity". Drawing on the 1905 Russian Revolution, she argued in her 1906 text The Mass Strike that mass action was the driving force of revolution. She contended that political consciousness and organization were born from the struggle itself. She wrote that "the element of spontaneity... plays a great part in all Russian mass strikes without exception, be it as a driving force or as a restraining influence".

In The Russian Revolution, she argued that "socialism would come from below or it would not be socialism at all." This theoretical difference underpinned her critique of the Bolsheviks' suppression of the Constituent Assembly, which she saw as stifling the popular energy essential for a successful revolution. Luxemburg's strategic view was summarized by her assertion that "the true dialectic of revolutions" runs "not through a majority to revolutionary tactics, but through revolutionary tactics to a majority". According to Nettl, her pamphlet was less a discussion of detailed Russian policies and more "an examination of the basic propositions of revolution" and a glimpse of how she "envisaged the future" in the form of an "ideal revolution".

The spontaneity/consciousness dialectic became a foundational element of the state-sanctioned artistic method of socialist realism in the Soviet Union. The typical socialist realist "masterplot" features a positive hero who progresses from a state of relative "spontaneity" to a higher degree of "consciousness" under the guidance of a party mentor, thereby affirming the authority of the Communist Party. Luxemburg's position on spontaneity challenged this core tenet of Leninist Marxism that was being enshrined in Soviet culture.

Luxemburg's ideas, particularly her advocacy of "Spontaneism", gained renewed popularity in the 1960s and 1970s among European leftists, such as those in the autonomous movement, who were seeking alternatives to the Soviet model of Marxism. Several new editions of her work were published during this period. The debate over whether she changed her mind on her critique of the Russian Revolution remains active. The pamphlet's insistence on the "inseparable bond between genuine democracy and genuine socialism" has continued to resonate with later commentators, who see her work as a vital alternative to both Stalinism and social democracy, representing a vision of socialism that is "both authentically revolutionary and radically democratic".
