= Donna L. Moody =

Abenaki scholar, author and public speaker

Donna Moody
- Education: University of Massachusetts/Amherst
- Spouse: John S. Moody

Donna L. Moody was a scholar, author, teacher, public speaker, Abenaki Repatriation and Site Protection Coordinator, and founder of the Winter Center for Indigenous Traditions.

== Repatriation and Site Protection Coordinator ==
Moody served as the Repatriation and Site Protection Coordinator for the Abenaki Nation from September 1994 to December 2013. This meant working with state agencies in New Hampshire and Vermont, federal agencies, museums, colleges/universities and private holding entities to recover, repatriate, and reinter ancestral remains, grave goods, and items of cultural patrimony for the Abenaki Nation. Over those nineteen years, Moody also worked to foster positive and productive communications between the Abenaki Nation and the many universities throughout New England that currently reside in the homelands of the Abenaki and other related indigenous peoples.

At the University of New Hampshire in Durham, Moody established a relationship in October 1994 with Robert G. Goodby, anthropology professor and president of the New Hampshire Archeological Society. This later led to the discovery of the remains of three individuals by Goodby in 1996, which had been lost in the attic of the UNH Archaeology Lab since their excavation from an archaeological site in Seabrook, New Hampshire, in 1975. From 1997 to 2017, Dr. Moody and ethno-historian John Moody designed and managed the first exhaustive research and repatriation project in Abenaki country on the extensive UNHAC (University of New Hampshire Archaeological Collection), which resulted in the identification of several more human remains, numerous additional grave goods, and sacred items, many of which were repatriated to the Abenaki Nation. A historic, long-term research and curation set of protocols and best practices were developed in collaboration with the UNH Archaeological Department and administration to carefully and collaboratively manage the UNHAC.

Since the Abenaki Nation is only federally recognized in Canada, Moody had to manage several additional steps to facilitate a number of NAGPRA (Native American Graves Protection and Repatriation Act)-mandated repatriations to the Abenaki Nation. In three of the more recent repatriations, the NAGPRA Review Committee also requested that the Abenaki Nation receive letters of support to repatriate from the Wampanoag Confederation and Wabanaki tribes of Maine. Then she worked to create a broad coalition of Abenaki groups. This directly led to the New Hampshire Division of Historic Resources' repatriation of the three lost individuals' remains to the Abenaki Nation in 2002, along with the remains of 14 other individuals from other sites across New England.

This process led to the repatriation of numerous Abenaki burials, grave goods, and sacred items from several museums, universities, state, and federal agencies including the University of New Hampshire, Franklin Pierce University, Harvard University, Dartmouth College, the University of Vermont, the NHDHR, the Vermont Division for Historic Preservation, and the United States Natural Resource Conservation Service. It also has made it possible to rebury and protect Abenaki remains and burial grounds, as well as numerous sacred places in the Abenaki homeland. In addition, Dr. Moody and the Abenaki Nation coalition partners including Dr. David Stewart Smith have facilitated the repatriation of several sets of Indigenous remains, numerous grave goods, and thousands of sacred items to several other Native Nations and Confederacies including the Penobscot Nation, the Seneca Nation, the Haudenausaunee, and the Chickasaw Nation of Oklahoma. Dr Moody and the Abenaki Nation coalition have also facilitated the reburial of several non-Native sets of remains and associated grave goods in Bradford and Etna, New Hampshire.

== Winter Center for Indigenous Traditions ==
Moody founded the Winter Center for Indigenous Traditions (WCIT) with her husband John Moody in 1997. The WCIT is based in the Upper Valley region of Vermont and New Hampshire, and is a service non-profit created for the purpose of strengthening and sustaining Native communities. The WCIT Archives, Library, and Research Center works to forward the ethical accessibility of indigenous people's documents, records, oral histories, and videos. These archives are used as a public educational resource and for the purposes of site protection and repatriation, historical studies, educational and indigenous language survival, and informational programs for the public.

== Published works ==
- "Native Space" and "Ancient Ways of Travel on the Kwanitekw" in Where the Great River Rises: An Atlas of the Connecticut River Watershed in Vermont and New Hampshire.
- Intersecting Symbols in Indigenous American and African Material Culture: Diffusion or Independent Invention and Who Decides? University of Massachusetts Amherst, 2013.
- Ideological Conflict Embedded in Anthropology and the Road to Restructuring the Discipline. University of Massachusetts Amherst, 2016.
- "Green Mountain Stewardship: One Landscape, Multiple Histories" in Cross Cultural Collaboration: Native Peoples and Archaeologists in the Northeastern United States.
