= 2001 Dartmouth College murders =

Murder of two Dartmouth College professors in Etna, New Hampshire, United States

- Date: January 27, 2001
- Location: Etna, New Hampshire, US; 43.6975°N 72.2264°W
- Type: Double homicide
- Deaths: 2: Professor Half Zantop; Professor Susanne Zantop
- Arrests: 2
- Convicted: James Jennings Parker; Robert Wilbert Tulloch
- Verdict: Guilty
- Convictions: Parker: second-degree murder Tulloch: first-degree murder

On January 27, 2001, Dartmouth College professors Half and Susanne Zantop, aged 62 and 55 respectively, were stabbed to death at their home in Etna, New Hampshire. Originally from Germany, the couple had been teaching at Dartmouth since the 1970s. High school classmates James J. Parker, age 16, and Robert W. Tulloch, age 17, were charged with first-degree murder.

Parker pleaded guilty to second-degree murder in exchange for testifying against Tulloch, and was sentenced to 25 years to life in prison; he was granted parole in April 2024. Tulloch pleaded guilty to first-degree murder and received the mandatory sentence of life imprisonment without parole. In 2014, the New Hampshire Supreme Court ordered Tulloch's sentence reviewed, but the review hearing did not commence until September 2024. In April 2025, the Court declined to review the trial court's certified questions regarding life sentences without parole for juvenile offenders under the New Hampshire Constitution, remanding the case back to Grafton County's Superior Court Judge Leonard MacLeod for further proceedings. On October 21, 2025, Judge MacLeod ruled that life sentences for juvenile offenders violate the New Hampshire Constitution's prohibition on "cruel and unusual punishments." In 2026, using this reasoning, Tulloch was resentenced to '45 to life'. He will be eligible for parole in 2046 at the age of 62.

== Half and Susanne Zantop ==
Half Zantop was born in Germany in 1938. He earned his undergraduate degree in geology from Freiburg University. He then studied at Washington State University and earned a Ph.D. from the School of Earth Sciences at Stanford University in 1969.

Susanne Zantop was born in Kissingen, Germany, in 1945. She enrolled at the Free University of Berlin where she majored in political science. She then began working on her master's degree in political science at Stanford University.

While at Stanford, the two met; they were married in 1970. They had two daughters, Veronika and Mariana.

Half was hired by Dartmouth College in 1976 where he taught geology and earth science, and was popular among many of his students. Susanne earned a PhD from Harvard University in 1984 in German and Spanish, and afterwards taught in the German department at Dartmouth, where she was department chair for a time.

In 2000, they had begun discussing retirement in the near future.

== The murders ==
Tulloch and Parker went to the Zantop residence on the morning of January 27, 2001. Posing as students doing research for a school survey, they intended to take the occupants by surprise, threaten them into revealing their PINs, and rob and kill them. Half allowed them inside, while Susanne was preparing a dish for a dinner she was hosting that evening at home.

According to his confession, Parker said that Zantop was "an alright guy" and that they did not need to kill him. Tulloch allegedly became angered when Zantop, a professor of earth science, told him that he had to come more prepared, for questions for the purported research. As Zantop opened his wallet to give Tulloch and Parker the business card of a friend who he thought could help with their "study," Tulloch attacked him. Tulloch took his SOG Knife and repeatedly stabbed Half in the chest and face, accidentally cutting his own leg in the process.

When Susanne came from the kitchen and tried to stop him, Parker stabbed and injured her, allegedly at Tulloch's orders. Tulloch also stabbed her in the head and body, killing her. Covered in blood, the pair left after taking $340 from Half's wallet. They left their knife sheaths at the scene.

== Discovery and capture ==
The Zantops' bodies were found that evening by family friend Roxana Verona, who had arrived as an invited guest for dinner. She immediately notified police.

Investigators at first speculated that it was a crime of passion by someone having an affair with Half, but that idea was soon disproved. There were several false leads. The Associated Press reported at least three persons of interest were interviewed by police and that "A task force set up after the murders also received hundreds of phone calls, letters and e-mails from people with wild theories about the killings". After finding a bloody footprint and the two distinctive knife sheaths at the scene, the police traced the knives to Parker three weeks after the murders.

According to the 16-year-old Parker, he had not gotten into trouble at school or in the community. He had an alibi for the time of the crime. He said that he bought the knives with Tulloch in order to build a fort. He claimed that they sold them at a surplus store after finding they were too heavy. Parker agreed to undergo fingerprinting.

The investigators paid Tulloch a visit. At that time, they doubted that the pair were the killers and told Tulloch he was not required to speak with them. Tulloch did talk with them without a lawyer present and told them the same story as had Parker. When they asked about the deep cut above his right knee, he told them that he slipped on a rock and cut himself on a metal spigot. When they asked to fingerprint him and borrow boots for matching purposes, he signed a search warrant.

The same request had not been made of Parker, because it was suggested by a detective whom they had phoned to get his version of the story.

The following day, Tulloch and Parker's families found that the boys had left their homes. When Parker's father found a note stating "Don't call the cops", he quickly did. Police found that Tulloch's bootprints matched those found in the Zantops' home. Fingerprints taken from the two youths matched those at the crime scene. A warrant was put out for Tulloch's arrest. Parker, still a minor, was sought for questioning in the murders.

Believing that police would be looking for their car, the pair abandoned Parker's silver Audi at a truck stop in Sturbridge, Massachusetts, intending to hitchhike to California. A truck driver who picked them up in New Jersey announced their intent to travel west via CB radio. A police officer, pretending to be another driver, offered to pick them up. At the Flying J truck stop in Spiceland, Indiana, the pair were captured and taken into custody by authorities.

== Prosecution ==
The two youths were indicted on a range of charges. The indictment said that they had made four previous tries over six months, to gain entry to houses in the area in Vermont and New Hampshire, with the intent of robbing their victims, getting their ATM cards and passwords, and then killing them. In the first case, on July 19, 2000, they cut the telephone wires to a house in Vershire, Vermont. Tulloch knocked on the door and tried to gain entry with a story about his car having broken down but was refused entry. He was denied entry in the other three instances as well before they successfully gained entry at the Zantops.

After the two young men were captured and jailed pending trial, the prosecution charged Parker as an adult because of the severity of the crime, making him liable to stand trial. He made a plea bargain with the state in which he would testify against Tulloch as a witness, plead guilty to second-degree murder, and receive a maximum sentence of twenty-five years to life with a possibility of parole after 16 years. The profits from any book deals or movie offers that he might agree to, will go directly to the Zantops' children.

Tulloch's lawyer tried, without success, to have Tulloch certified as suffering from mental illness, in order to use the insanity defense. Tulloch pleaded guilty to first-degree murder.

== Sentencing ==
During the sentencing hearing, Parker wept and expressed remorse during his apology for his part in the killings. He was sentenced to 25 years with a possibility of parole after 16 years.

After Tulloch's guilty plea, he was sentenced to life imprisonment without parole. He showed no emotion at the sentencing hearing and made no statement.

== Parker post-sentencing and parole ==
Parker was held in the New Hampshire State Prison for Men in Concord and was classified as a Custody Level 3 prisoner, medium custody, which meant that he had freedom to move within the prison, except for head counts and lock downs at night. This classification allows inmates to leave their cells until the mandatory lockdown at 11 P.M. Prison officials reported that Parker took part in play productions put on by inmates, worked at arts and crafts, played guitar and practiced yoga.

On April 18, 2024, James Parker was granted parole and he was released in June 2024. Parker had expressed profound remorse for the murders and had a track record as a good inmate, including earning bachelor's degree and master's degree in management from New England College while in prison. Corrections officials said he will remain under supervision until 2098. He is subject to returning to prison if he violates any parole conditions.

== Tulloch re-sentencing review ==
Tulloch is held in the New Hampshire State Prison for Men in Concord after beginning his sentence at the Northern New Hampshire Correctional Facility in Berlin. While Parker was incarcerated, both ate meals in the same chow hall at the same time. However, their contact was reported as minimal.

In 2012, the US Supreme Court ruled in Miller v. Alabama, that mandatory sentencing to life imprisonment without parole (LWOP) of persons who committed a crime as juveniles was unconstitutional. It ruled that this decision needed to be applied retroactively, with cases to be reviewed of persons sentenced to LWOP for crimes committed as juveniles. Their ruling was based on scientific studies that have shown conclusively that juvenile brains are still unformed. The high court based their decision on the basis that juvenile offenders have “diminished culpability and greater prospects for reform” and judges should be able to consider the “mitigating qualities of youth” in sentencing.

In August 2014, the New Hampshire Supreme Court ruled that Tulloch's case would be among four to be reviewed by the court for re-sentencing. The initial review had been appealed by the New Hampshire Attorney General. Parker was not affected by this ruling, because he was not charged with first-degree murder, an adult charge that carries a mandatory LWOP sentence. After review of different factors in the case, the court could again re-sentence Tulloch to life imprisonment without parole or could impose a different sentence.

A resentencing hearing was held on September 25, 2024, with the judge taking the arguments of the prosecutor and defense under advisement. In November 2024, Judge Leonard MacLeod of the Grafton County Superior Court sent questions related to the case to the New Hampshire Supreme Court. In April 2025, The New Hampshire Supreme Court declined to take up the question of Tulloch’s life sentence without the possibility of parole. The unanimous declination came without any written ruling and sent the matter back to Judge MacLeod for further proceedings. The New Hampshire Supreme Court has not yet ruled on the constitutionality of life without parole sentences for minors, leaving Judge MacLeod without clear precedent under the New Hampshire Constitution.

On October 21, 2025, Judge MacLeod ruled that life sentences for juvenile offenders violate the New Hampshire Constitution's prohibition on "cruel and unusual punishments." The ruling may face an appeal, but if the decision is upheld on appeal, the trial court would then consider Tulloch's request for resentencing.

Tulloch's resentencing hearing took place on Monday, July 13, 2026. He will be eligible for parole in approximately 20 years from the court date, the judge ruled. During trial, Tulloch apologized to one of the daughters of his victims. She stated: “This wasn’t a crime of passion or retribution, he wasn’t using substances, he wasn’t psychotic. There was just sheer depravity.” After her statement, she urged the court to seek the longest possible sentence. Tulloch's previously prepared statement was allegedly abandoned, with him saying “After listening to (her say) that, I feel disgusted by even thinking I could say anything that would mean anything.” He could be considered for parole in 2046 when he is 62 years old, the same age one of his victims, Half Zantop was when he was murdered.
