= Northeast Airlines Flight 946 =

1968 aviation accident

- A photo of accident wreckage as published in the Manchester Union Leader

Accident
- Date: October 25, 1968 (58 years ago)
- Summary: Controlled flight into terrain due to pilot error
- Site: Etna, Town of Hanover, Grafton County, New Hampshire, U.S.; 43°43.3′N 72°8.8′W

Aircraft
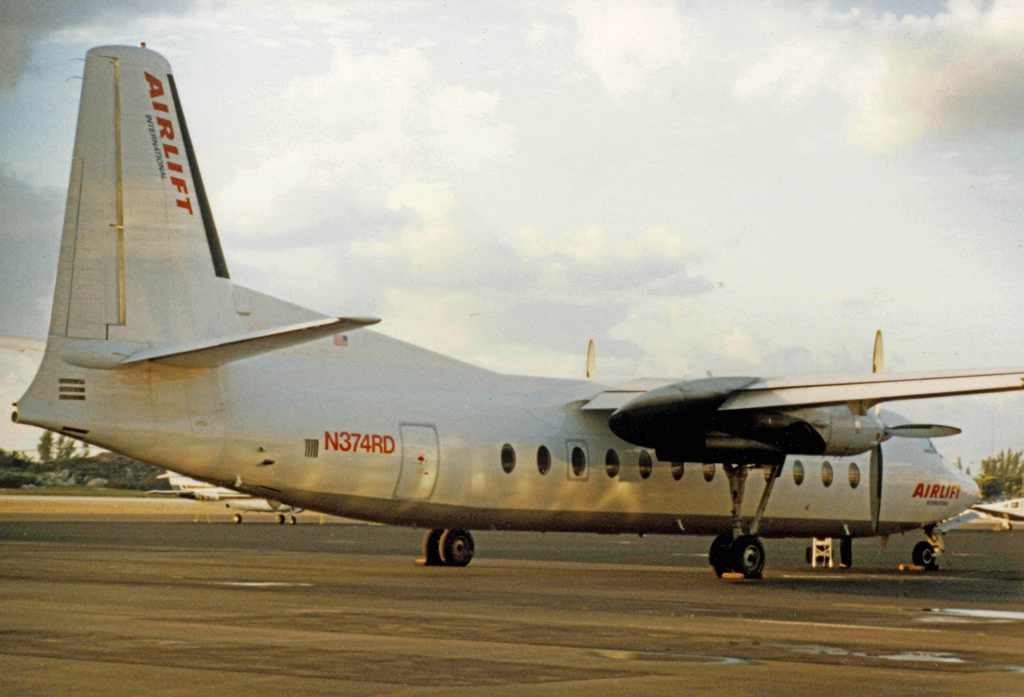
- A Fairchild Hiller FH-227 similar to the one involved
- Aircraft type: Fairchild Hiller FH-227
- Operator: Northeast Airlines
- Registration: N380NE
- Passengers: 39
- Crew: 3
- Fatalities: 32 (2 crew, 30 passengers)
- Injuries: 10
- Survivors: 10

Northeast Airlines Flight 946 was a domestic U.S. flight from Boston, Massachusetts, to Montpelier, Vermont, with a scheduled stop in Lebanon, New Hampshire, operated by Northeast Airlines. On October 25, 1968, shortly after 6 p.m. local time, the Fairchild Hiller FH-227 aircraft crashed on Moose Mountain in Grafton County, New Hampshire, while descending on approach. The crash killed 32 of 42 passengers and crew; 10 people survived the crash with minor or moderate injuries. It remains the deadliest plane crash in New Hampshire history.

== Crew ==
The crew of Flight 946 consisted of a crew of three: a pilot, copilot, and flight attendant. Captain John A. Rapsis, 52, had been a pilot for Northeast Airlines since 1957 and had over 14,700 hours of flight experience, approximately 1,200 in FH-277 aircraft. The copilot, John C. O'Neil, 29, was hired in 1967 and had 2,500 hours of flight experience, approximately 280 in FH-277 aircraft. The 21-year-old flight attendant, Betty Frail, had completed her training in June 1968; she survived the crash. (Note: Frail later earned a medical degree at Tufts University; she died of breast cancer in 1982.)

== Flight and crash ==
At 5:42 p.m. ET, Northeast Airlines Flight 946 left Logan International Airport towards its first stop in Lebanon, New Hampshire. The plane carried 39 passengers and three crew members. Upon being cleared for the instrument approach, the flight service station at Lebanon advised the crew that the weather was "an estimated ceiling of 2,000 feet overcast; (Note: Ceiling: 2,000 feet, 610 m) visibility was 10 miles; (Note: Visibility: 10 miles, 16 km) there were breaks in the overcast." The flight was "normal and routine" until the plane approached Lebanon Municipal Airport, which is located in a valley, surrounded by nearby hills.

At 6:11 p.m., the pilots radioed the control tower that they were executing a standard approach maneuver before preparing to land. Air traffic control replied and gave the crew weather, visibility and other information regarding conditions at the airport. At approximately 6:17 p.m., the plane crashed into the side of Moose Mountain. (Note: Moose Mountain is an 8-mile-long (13 km) ridge; its highest point has an elevation of 2,303 feet (702 m).) The impact killed 30 of the 39 passengers and two of the three crew members; 31 people died on impact and one died later. A post-impact fire consumed much of the wreckage and, due to the remoteness of the crash site, lasted for approximately 18 hours until it burned itself out.

== Rescue and recovery efforts ==
Emergency personnel arrived at the scene about 90 minutes after the crash. Ten survivors were taken to the Mary Hitchcock Hospital, at least one in critical condition, and the hospital authorities said that no more injured were expected. While initial newspaper reports said that helicopters were used to ferry the injured to the Dartmouth College campus, the heavily wooded conditions on Moose Mountain prevented them from landing, and the injured were removed via foot and four-wheel drive vehicles to ambulances about two miles (3.2 km) from the crash site. Survivors first arrived at the hospital at 10:40 p.m. Military authorities participating in the rescue operation said that bad weather had complicated matters. It was raining at the crash scene, with snow at higher altitudes, and freezing temperatures were expected.

Persons at the scene said that the plane had crashed on the north side of the mountain about 60 feet (20 m) from the top. Heavy woods and ledges forced rescue workers to hike to the wreckage. Newsmen attempting to reach the scene of the crash on Moose Mountain were blocked at the base by the New Hampshire State Police. Only the police, firemen and other rescue workers were allowed up the mountain.

The passengers who survived the crash were at the rear of the plane and were able to escape the wreckage through the rear emergency exit or through the fractures in the fuselage. Of the fatalities, four were employees from the National Life Insurance Company who were returning from a business trip. The fatalities also included a former reporter for the Barre Times and a member of the U.S. Navy on his way home for the weekend. Six passengers on the plane were en route to a Head Start conference at Goddard College in Plainfield, Vermont; four were killed in the crash. Additionally, historian J. P. Nettl, known for his biography of Rosa Luxemburg, was killed in the accident; his wife survived.

== Aftermath ==
The president of National Life held a memorial for the company employees who died in the crash.

The National Transportation Safety Board (NTSB), then chaired by John H. Reed, conducted an investigation, the report of which was finalized in April 1970.{} It noted that the plane was flying nearly 600 feet (180 m) below its required altitude, having crashed at an altitude of 2,237 feet (682 m) when it should have been no lower than 2,800 feet (850 m). It is unclear why the pilots made the decision to fly at the low altitude, as the cockpit voice recorder was badly damaged in the crash and no data could be retrieved from it. Some information was recovered from the flight data recorder. Ultimately, the NTSB stated that the probable cause of the accident was that the pilots had prematurely started their descent and were not able to accurately determine their position as "they had performed a nonstandard approach and there were no supplement navigational aids available for their use."

Officials at the New Hampshire Aeronautics Commission charged that the Federal Aviation Administration (FAA) had ignored repeated warnings about installing an instrument landing system (ILS) navigational approach at Lebanon Municipal Airport and that installing such system might have prevented the crash.

The crash affected the struggling Northeast Airlines, as it was the fifth airline crash in its 25-year history. At the time of the crash, the airline had lost four planes and 38 passengers and crew. The airline continued to operate independently until its merger with Delta Air Lines in the 1970s.

In 2018, Jeff Rapsis, son of the pilot of Flight 946, led a hike to the site of the crash on Moose Mountain; attendees included two local firefighters who had responded to the incident in 1968.

== See also ==
- List of accidents and incidents involving commercial aircraft
- List of disasters in New Hampshire by death toll
