= Roland Robertson =

British American sociologist and author

- Born: 7 August 1938; Blofield, England
- Died: 29 April 2022 (aged 83); Leicester, England
- Education: University of Southampton
- Occupation: Sociologist
- Spouse: Jennifer Robertson (1961–1981) Kate White (1984–2004) Judith Velody (2018–present)
- Children: Mark Robertson Thomas Robertson Joel Robertson

Roland Robertson (August 7, 1938 – April 29, 2022) was a sociologist and theorist of globalization who lectured at the University of Aberdeen in Scotland. Formerly, he was a professor of sociology at the University of Pittsburgh, and in 1988 he was the president of the Association for the Sociology of Religion.

== Biography ==
Robertson was born near Norwich, Great Britain in 1938. He received his undergraduate degree at the University of Southampton and taught at the University of Essex, the University of York, the University of Pittsburgh, and the University of Aberdeen.

Robertson had three sons with Jennifer Robertson before getting divorced in 1981.

Robertson married long time partner Judith Velody in 2018.

== Career ==
Robertson's theories have focused significantly on a more phenomenological and psycho-social approach than that of more materialist oriented theorists such as Immanuel Wallerstein or Fredric Jameson. For Robertson, the most interesting aspect of the modern (or postmodern) era is the way in which a global consciousness has developed. He lays down a progression of "phases" that capture the central aspects of different eras in global history, asserting that the fifth phase, Global Uncertainty, has been reached.

Robertson's main works are Globalization: Social Theory and Global Culture (1992) and the edited volume Global Modernities. In 1985, he was the first sociologist to use the term globalization in the title of a sociological article. His 1992 definition of globalization as "the compression of the world and the intensification of the consciousness of the world as a whole" has been credited as the first ever definition of globalization, though a more detailed analysis of the history of this term indicates it has many authors. He is also said to have coined the term glocalization in 1992.

== Publications ==
=== Books ===
- Roland Robertson (1970 Shocken Books ISBN 9780805233476) The Sociological Interpretation of Religion
- J. P. Nettl, Roland Robertson (1968 New York Basic Books ISBN 9780571084166) International Systems and the Modernization of Societies
- Roland Robertson (1978 New York University Press ISBN 9780814773741) Meaning and Change
- Roland Robertson (1992 Sage Publications Ltd ISBN 9780803981874) Globalization: Social Theory and Global Culture
- Edited by Mike Featherstone, Scott Lash & Roland Robertson, (1995 Sage Publications Ltd ISBN 9780803979482) Global Modernities
