= Etna, New Hampshire =

Unincorporated community in New Hampshire, United States

- Unincorporated community
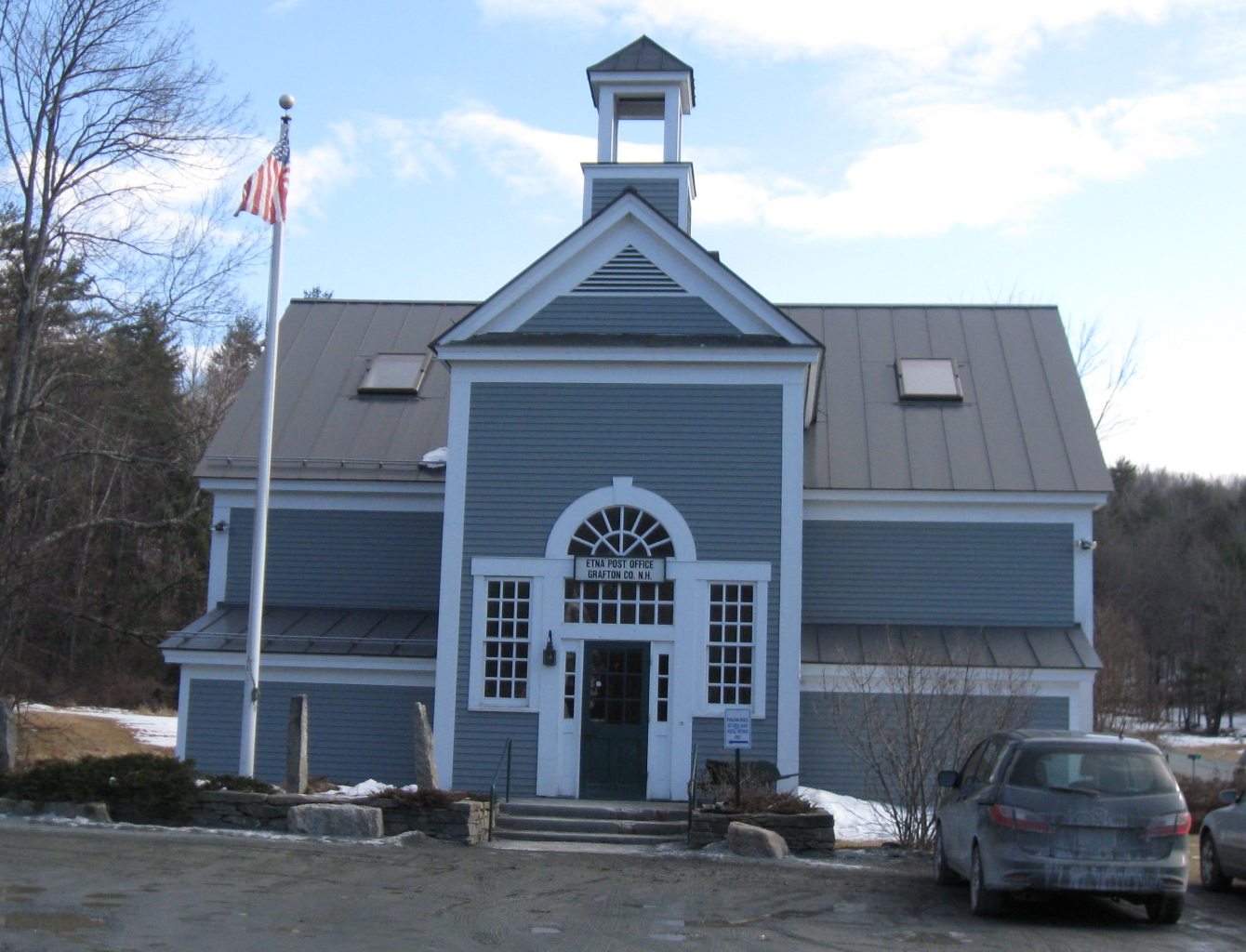
- Etna Post Office

- Location within New Hampshire Location within the United States
- Coordinates: 43°41′34″N 72°13′18″W
- Country: United States
- State: New Hampshire
- County: Grafton
- Town: Hanover
- Elevation: 771 ft (235 m)
- Time zone: UTC-5 (Eastern (EST))
  - Summer (DST): UTC-4 (EDT)
- ZIP code: 03750
- Area code: 603
- GNIS feature ID: 866813

Etna, originally named "Mill Village", is a small community within the town of Hanover, New Hampshire, United States. It is located in southwestern Grafton County, approximately 3 miles (5 km) east of Hanover's downtown and 2.5 miles (4.0 km) south of the village of Hanover Center, on Mink Brook. Etna has a separate ZIP code (03750) from the rest of Hanover, as well as its own fire station, general store, ball field, playground, church, and library, with adjacent conserved land and bird sanctuary. The population within Etna's ZIP Code area, including surrounding rural land, was 870 at the 2010 census.

== History ==
Etna developed as a small rural community within the town of Hanover, New Hampshire. Historically, the area was characterized by agriculture and small local businesses serving nearby residents and travelers in the region. Over time, Etna became known as one of the villages associated with Hanover and the surrounding Upper Valley area.

On October 25, 1968, Etna was near the crash site of Northeast Airlines Flight 946, the deadliest aviation accident in New Hampshire history. The aircraft crashed on nearby Moose Mountain during its approach to Lebanon Municipal Airport, resulting in the deaths of 32 passengers and crew on board, with 10 who survived the crash.

Etna was also the site of the 2001 Dartmouth College murders, in which professors Half and Susanne Zantop were killed in their home.

== Transportation ==
Etna can be accessed from New Hampshire Route 120 via Greensboro Road or Great Hollow Road (Etna Road, north of the Lebanon exit (number 18) from Interstate 89), or from Hanover via Trescott Road (East Wheelock Street). The Appalachian Trail passes roughly one mile (1.6 km) north of the village before it turns northeastward to cross Moose Mountain on its way to Lyme.

== Points of interest ==
Commerce revolves around the Etna Country Store and the Etna Post Office. The country store reopened in 2022, following renovations. It is built on the site of the original Etna General Store, which burned down in 1921.

The Etna Church is also a point of interest, hosting weekly worship services and other community gatherings.

== Notable people ==
- Wyatt Allen (b. 1979), Olympic gold medalist, rowing
- Barbara Bedford (b. 1972), Olympic gold medalist, swimming, grew up in Etna
- John G. Kemeny (1926–1992), mathematician and computer scientist, president of Dartmouth College
- C. Everett Koop (1916–2013), 13th U.S. Surgeon General
- Robert W. McCollum (1925–2010), virologist; made important discoveries regarding polio and hepatitis
- Robert Morris (1932–2011), cryptographer, computer scientist
- Jodi Picoult (b. 1966), author (My Sister's Keeper, The Pact, and Nineteen Minutes)
- Mary Roach (b. 1959), non-fiction author
