= 1996 New Hampshire Learjet 35 crash =

1996 aviation accident in New Hampshire

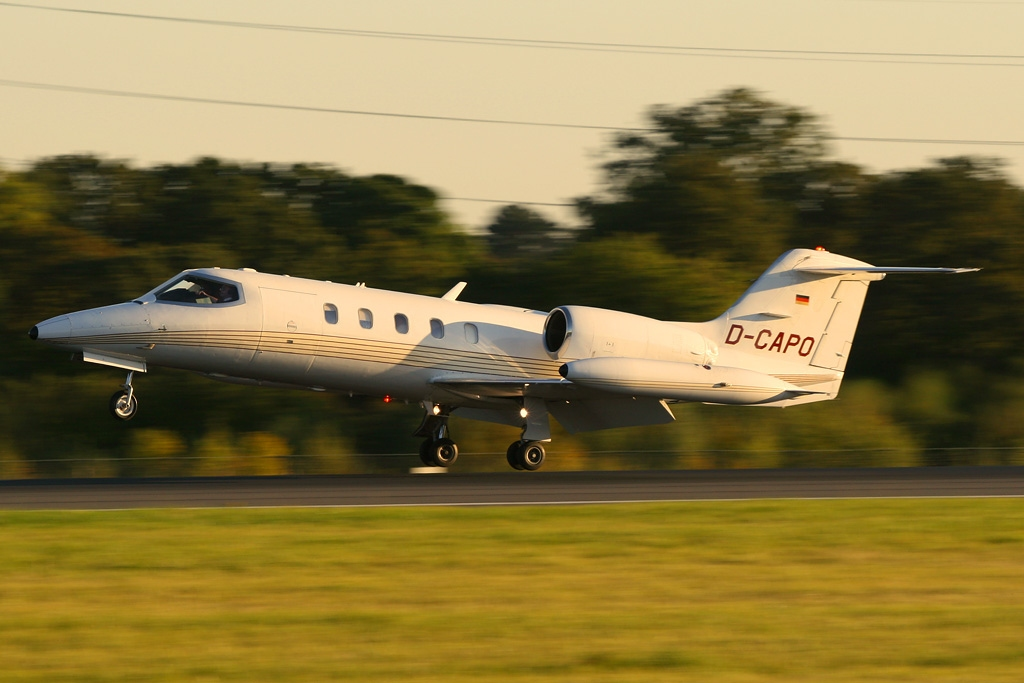
- A Learjet 35A similar to the accident aircraft

Accident
- Date: December 24, 1996
- Summary: Controlled flight into terrain
- Site: Dorchester, New Hampshire; 43°49.56′N 72°00.75′W

Aircraft
- Aircraft type: Learjet 35A
- Operator: Aircraft Charter Group, Inc.
- Registration: N388LS
- Flight origin: Sikorsky Memorial Airport, Bridgeport, Connecticut
- Destination: Lebanon Municipal Airport, Lebanon, New Hampshire
- Occupants: 2
- Crew: 2
- Fatalities: 2
- Survivors: 0

On Christmas Eve 1996, a Learjet 35A business jet disappeared near Dorchester, New Hampshire, United States. The crash led to the longest missing aircraft search in the state's history, lasting almost three years. Media attention eventually resulted in congressional legislation mandating improved emergency locator transmitters (ELTs) be installed in U.S.-registered business jets.

== Crash information ==
The aircraft involved, registration N388LS, was operated by the Aircraft Charter Group and flown by pilots Johan Schwartz and Patrick Hayes for a repositioning flight to Lebanon, New Hampshire. They left Sikorsky Memorial Airport in Bridgeport, Connecticut, at 09:19 am, and 25 minutes later were flying the approach into Lebanon Municipal Airport. After one attempt at the instrument landing system approach, the crew reported that they were unable to receive the localizer, when they were actually several miles off course. They presumed ground equipment failure, and the pilot told the tower that he was executing a missed approach. The aircraft's last radar contact was as it proceeded outbound, 7 nautical miles (8.1 mi; 13 km) northeast of the VOR, at 4,800 ft (1,500 m). As the business jet neared the inbound course to the VOR, the captain called out the outer marker. The first officer agreed, and the captain stated that they could descend to 2,300 feet (700 m). Shortly thereafter, the first officer stated that he was descending the aircraft to 2,300 feet. Three seconds later, the Learjet impacted trees, then terrain. The weather conditions were raining and foggy at the time.

Within an hour of the crash, an extensive search was underway which would eventually encompass an area of 2800 square miles. Snowmobiles, all terrain vehicles and more than a dozen Army helicopters were used in the effort, along with military satellites. Scuba divers explored the depths of several lakes in the area, but to no avail.

Almost three years later, on November 13, 1999, the wreckage and remains of the crew were discovered by a forester conducting a routine survey in a section of densely-forested private land near Smarts Mountain. The crash site lay at an altitude of 2,300 feet, on rising mountainous terrain, about 20 miles (32 km) from the airport and 12.5 nautical miles (14.4 mi; 23.2 km) east-northeast from the VOR. Debris was spread over a 150-yard (140 m) area. It was later determined that the airplane had descended 10.3 nautical miles prior to where a descent to 2,300 feet was authorized.

The cause of the accident, as determined by the National Transportation Safety Board (NTSB), was:

The captain's failure to maintain situational awareness, which resulted in the airplane being outside the confines of the instrument approach; and the crew's misinterpretation of a step-down fix passage, which resulted in an early descent into rising terrain. Factors included the captain's misreading of the instrument approach procedure, the crew's rushed and incomplete instrument approach briefing, their failure to use additional, available navigational aids, and their failure to account for the winds at altitude.

== ELT regulations ==
The crashed aircraft had no ELT on board, as that class of aircraft when used for FAR Part 135 charter operations, was exempt from the federal requirements for this type of beacon. As a result, Congress directed the FAA to require the installation of 406 MHz ELTs in all business jets (replacing the 121.5 MHz units installed in some).
