= Lebanon Municipal Airport (New Hampshire) =

Public-use airport in New Hampshire, United States

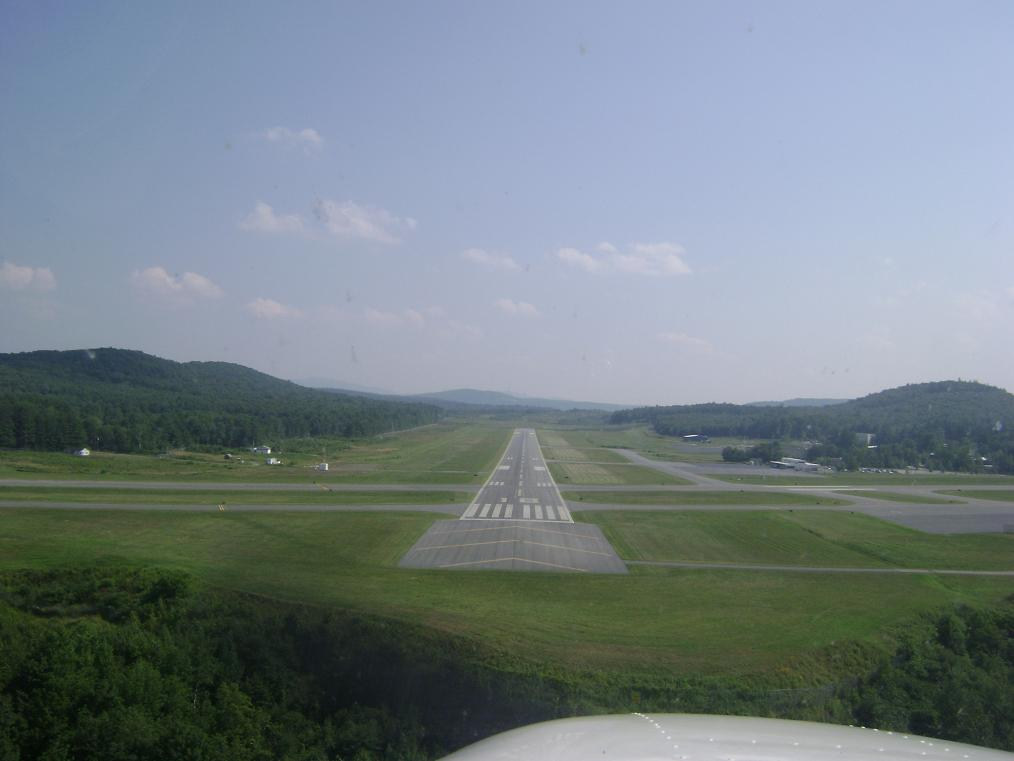
- Approach to Runway 18, July 2007
- IATA: LEB; ICAO: KLEB; FAA LID: LEB

Summary
- Airport type: Public
- Owner: City of Lebanon
- Serves: Lebanon, New Hampshire
- Elevation AMSL: 603 ft (184 m)
- Coordinates: 43°37′34″N 072°18′15″W
- Website: flyleb.com

Maps
- FAA airport diagram as of January 2021
- Interactive map of Lebanon Municipal Airport

Runways
Direction	Length		Surface
Direction	ft	m	Surface
7/25	5,496	1,675	Asphalt
18/36	5,200	1,585	Asphalt

Statistics (2018)
- Aircraft operations (year ending 9/1/2018): 26,123
- Based aircraft: 41
- Source: Federal Aviation Administration

Lebanon Municipal Airport (IATA: LEB, ICAO: KLEB, FAA LID: LEB) is a city-owned, public-use airport located three nautical miles (6 km) west of the central business district of Lebanon, a city in Grafton County, New Hampshire, United States. Also known as Lebanon Airport, it is the northernmost commercial airport in New Hampshire, near the Vermont border, off Interstate 89 just south of the junction with Interstate 91. The Lebanon Municipal Airport accommodates and services a wide variety of commercial and private aircraft, with a 5,000 foot runway and several modern T-Hangars and corporate hangars. Other nearby towns include Hanover, New Hampshire, and White River Junction, Vermont. The area is also the home of Dartmouth College and the Dartmouth–Hitchcock Medical Center.

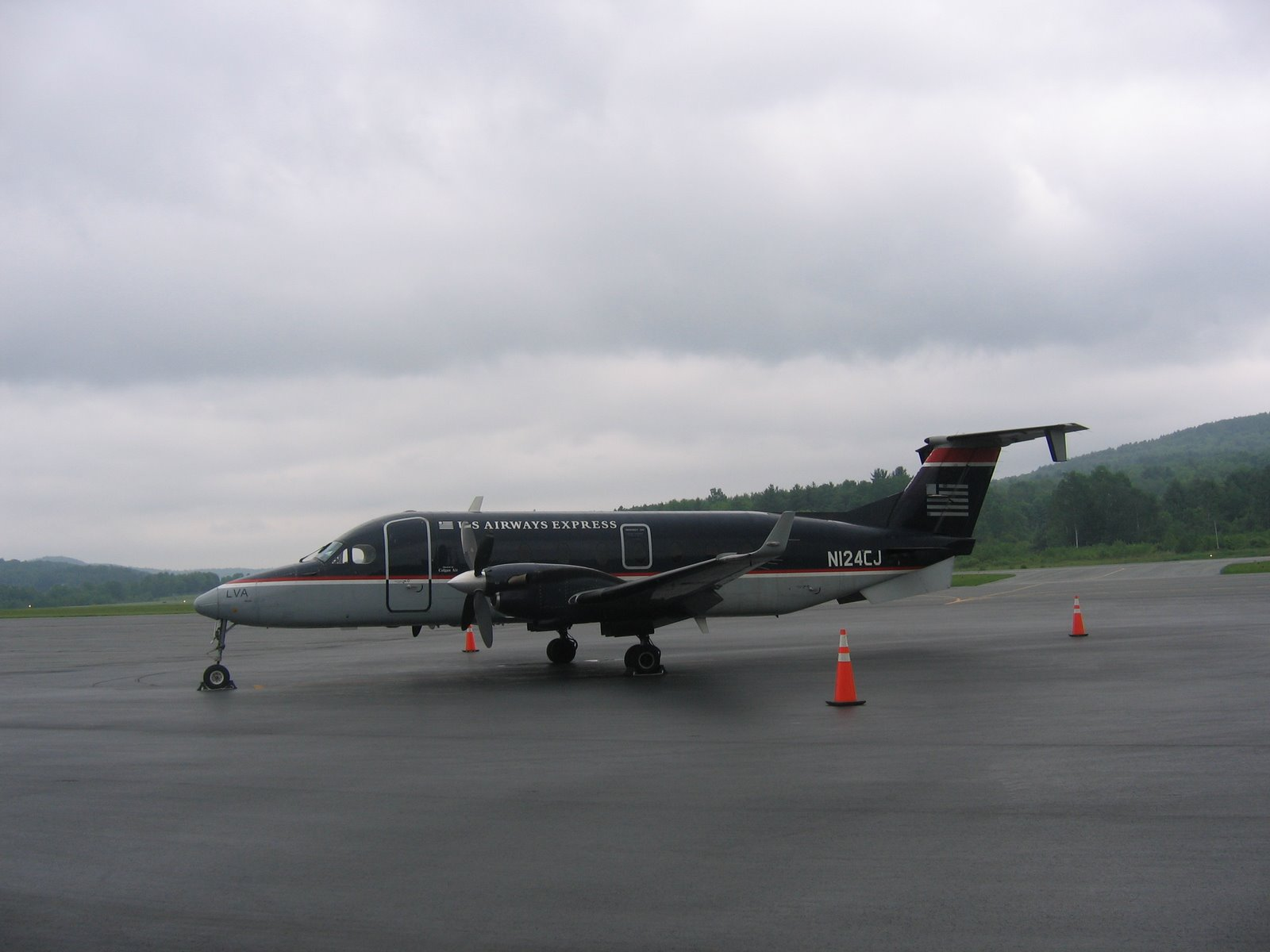
US Airways Express (Colgan Air) Beech 1900D at Lebanon Municipal Airport in 2007

In recent years, the airport has struggled due to competition with the much larger Manchester–Boston Regional Airport, 65 miles (87 kilometers) away and accessible via the I-89 freeway. Colgan Air formerly offered nonstop flights from Lebanon to New York LaGuardia Airport operating as US Airways Express via a code sharing agreement with US Airways. The airline first operated the flights with the Beechcraft 1900 commuter propjet, and later with the Saab 340 regional turboprop before service ended in November 2008.

On November 2, 2008, Cape Air began offering service to Boston. Airline service is subsidized by the Essential Air Service program utilizing the Tecnam P2012 Traveller aircraft. The terminal building has typical facilities such as baggage claim, a check-in desk, rental car services, and airport security.

As per Federal Aviation Administration records, the airport had 8,294 passenger boardings (enplanements) in calendar year 2008, 6,089 enplanements in 2009, and 7,832 in 2010. It is included in the Federal Aviation Administration (FAA) National Plan of Integrated Airport Systems for 2017–2021, in which it is categorized as a non-hub primary commercial service facility.

== History ==
In February 1941 a special town meeting took place to allow Selectmen to purchase a maximum of 750 acres on Slack Hill. In June 1944 the Federal government turned airport over to the town. The town of Lebanon promised that full rights would remain with the Federal government.

At the end of World War II, Sumner Atherton, a veteran aviator, set up Connecticut Valley Airways, and in 1947 he was successful in bidding for a 20-year lease to operate Lebanon Municipal Airport. He replaced Joseph Perley as Airport Manager, serving from 1950 to 1969, during which he oversaw the expansion of Lebanon Municipal Airport. Atherton was also Head, and sole director of Connecticut Valley Airways, and was instrumental in planning improvements to aviation in the region.

=== Historical airline service ===
Northeast Airlines started a scheduled service in 1948. The airport was a stop on a daily round trip service operated by Northeast with a Douglas DC-3 linking New York City with Montreal. The June 16, 1948 Northeast Airlines system timetable listed the routing of this flight as New York City - Hartford/Springfield - Keene, NH - Lebanon - Montpelier/Barre, VT - Burlington, VT - Montreal. By 1954 LEB had 8000 enplanements. Fares were Boston ($16.30), Burlington ($11.30), Montreal ($20.30) and New York ($30.60).

In 1964, Northeast was operating direct one stop service to New York John F. Kennedy Airport with four engine Douglas DC-6B propliners via Keene. By 1969, Northeast was operating up to ten flights a day from the airport with Fairchild Hiller FH-227 turboprop aircraft with nonstop service to New York LaGuardia Airport (LGA), Boston (BOS), Montpelier/Barre (MPV), Manchester, NH (MHT), and Keene, NH (EEN) with daily direct one stop service to Burlington (BTV). Northeast was merged into Delta Air Lines in 1972 which in turn continued to serve the airport.

In 1973, Delta was operating nonstop as well as direct service from the airport to New York LaGuardia Airport, and New York John F. Kennedy Airport (JFK) with Fairchild Hiller FH-227 turboprops with these aircraft having been previously operated by Northeast. At this same time, according to its March 1, 1973 system timetable, Delta had introduced McDonnell Douglas DC-9-30 jet service at nearby Keene, NH; however, Delta did not operate jet flights into Lebanon.

According to the April 15, 1975 edition of the Official Airline Guide (OAG), Delta was no longer serving the airport with all flights at this time being operated by Air New England with Beechcraft 99, de Havilland Canada DHC-6 Twin Otter and Fairchild Hiller FH-227 turboprop aircraft with nonstop service to Boston and Montpelier/Barre, VT as well as direct flights to New York LaGuardia Airport via a stop in Keene, NH. The OAG lists up to fourteen flights a day being operated into the airport by Air New England at this time. Air Vermont offered service to Burlington and Boston in the early 1980s.

== Facilities and aircraft ==
Lebanon Municipal Airport covers an area of 563 acres (228 ha) at an elevation of 603 feet (184 m) above mean sea level. It has two asphalt paved runways: 7/25 is 5,496 by 100 feet (1,675 x 30 m) and 18/36 is 5,200 by 100 feet (1,585 x 30 m).

For the 12-month period ending September 1, 2018, the airport had 26,123 aircraft operations, an average of 72 per day: 68% general aviation, 31% air taxi, and 1% military. At that time there were 41 aircraft based at this airport: 28 single-engine, 5 multi-engine, 3 jet, and 5 helicopter.

== Airline and destinations ==
=== Passenger ===
Cape Air connects Lebanon Airport to Logan International Airport (Boston) and Westchester County Airport (White Plains).

== Statistics ==
Top domestic destinations (August 2024 – July 2025)
Rank	City	Airport	Passengers
1	Boston, MA	Logan International Airport (BOS)	6,370
2	White Plains, NY	Westchester County Airport (HPN)	3,560

== Accidents and incidents ==
- 25 October 1968: The Northeast Airlines Flight 946 crash occurred when a Fairchild Hiller FH-227 crashed into Moose Mountain 10 miles (16 km) northeast of the airport while descending on approach. In 1969, Sumner Atherton testified at the inquest into the loss of Northeast Airlines Flight 946, where a faulty beacon was identified as the cause of the loss of Flight 946, which crashed on an instrument approach on October 25, 1968, with 32 fatalities and 10 survivors.

Atherton, who at the time was also a flight instructor, testified that he had been flying into the airport for 20 years and had found difficulty with the VOR system on the night of the crash when he was asked to fly over Moose Mountain to locate the crash site.

- The 1996 New Hampshire Learjet crash occurred on December 24, 1996, when a Learjet 35 crashed into a mountain 20 miles (32 km) northeast of the airport after executing a missed approach. The wreckage was not found until November 13, 1999.

== See also ==
- List of airports in New Hampshire

== Other sources ==
- Essential Air Service documents (Docket OST-2003-14822) from the U.S. Department of Transportation:
  - Order 2004-11-1 (November 5, 2004): selecting Colgan Air, Inc., d/b/a US Airways Express, to provide subsidized essential air service at Lebanon, New Hampshire, at an annual subsidy rate of $998,752 for the two-year period beginning October 1, 2004, through September 30, 2006.
  - Order 2006-6-37 (June 29. 2006): selecting Colgan Air, Inc., d/b/a US Airways Express, to continue to provide subsidized essential air service at Lebanon, New Hampshire, consisting of 18 nonstop round trip a week to LaGuardia International Airport, for a new two-year term through September 30, 2008, at the annual subsidy rate of $1,069,606.
  - Order 2008-7-27 (July 25, 2008): selecting Hyannis Air Service, Inc., d/b/a Cape Air, to provide subsidized essential air service (EAS) at Lebanon, New Hampshire, for an annual subsidy rate of $2,245,669, for a new two-year period, beginning when the carrier inaugurates full-service.
  - Order 2010-10-12 (October 19, 2010): selecting Hyannis Air Service, Inc. d/b/a Cape Air, to continue providing subsidized essential air service (EAS) at Lebanon, NH/White River Junction, VT (Lebanon), for the four-year period beginning December 1, 2010, through November 30, 2014, at the annual subsidy rate of $2,347,744.
