= Smarts Mountain =

Mountain in northwest New Hampshire, United States

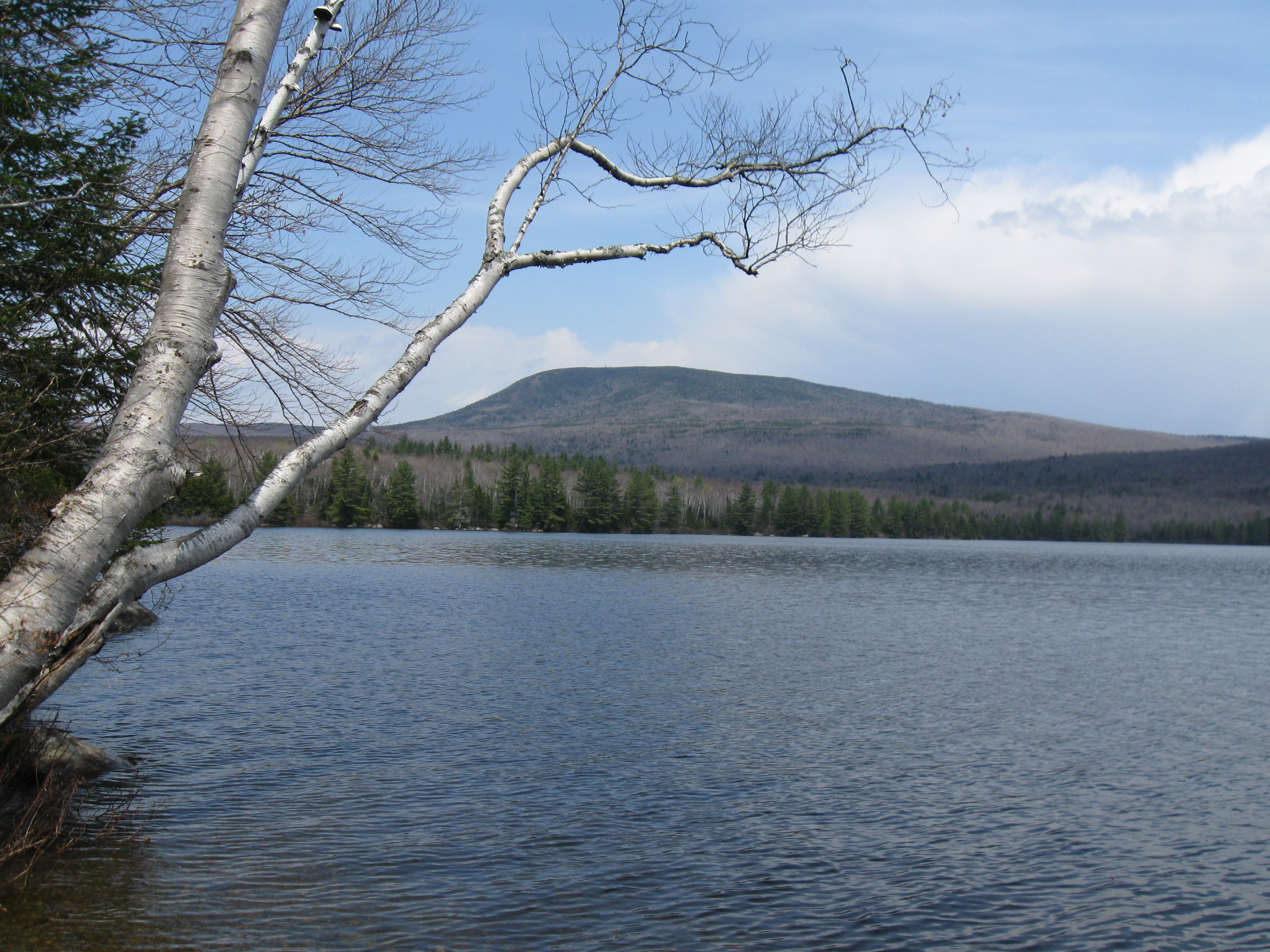
- Smarts Mountain over Reservoir Pond

Highest point
- Elevation: 987 m (3,238 ft)
- Prominence: 670 m (2,200 ft)
- Coordinates: 43°49.54′N 72°2.32′W

Geography
- Location: Grafton County, New Hampshire, U.S.
- Topo map: USGS Smarts Mountain (NH)

Smarts Mountain is a 3,238-foot-high (987 m) mountain in the town of Lyme in Grafton County, New Hampshire, United States. Smarts is flanked to the north by Mount Cube, at 2,909 feet (887 m), and to the southwest by Holts Ledge, at 2,110 feet (640 m). Although of only moderate elevation, Smarts is separated from the southwestern White Mountains by Oliverian Notch, a fairly low pass traversed by New Hampshire Route 25 southwest of Mount Moosilauke. That gives Smarts a relative height of 2,190 ft (670 m), which makes it one of twelve mountains in New Hampshire with a prominence over 2,000 ft (610 m).

The northwest and south sides of the mountain drain by several brooks into the Connecticut River and thence south into Long Island Sound in Connecticut. The northeast side drains east into the South Branch of the Baker River, and thence via the Pemigewasset and Merrimack rivers into the Gulf of Maine in Massachusetts.

Smarts Mountain is the southernmost significant mountain in New Hampshire on the Appalachian Trail, a 2,170-mile (3,490 km) National Scenic Trail from Georgia to Maine. Smarts is outside the White Mountain National Forest, but the trail runs through a narrow corridor along the ridges which is administered by the Forest Service.

There was a Learjet plane crash on the mountain in 1996, as well as a Piper Apache twin crash in 1971.

== Climate ==
Climate data for Smarts Mountain 43.8262 N, 72.0365 W, Elevation: 3,091 ft (942 m) (1991–2020 normals)
Month	Jan	Feb	Mar	Apr	May	Jun	Jul	Aug	Sep	Oct	Nov	Dec	Year
Mean daily maximum °F (°C)	21.1 (−6.1)	23.9 (−4.5)	32.7 (0.4)	46.0 (7.8)	58.9 (14.9)	66.8 (19.3)	71.1 (21.7)	69.8 (21.0)	63.1 (17.3)	50.5 (10.3)	36.3 (2.4)	26.5 (−3.1)	47.2 (8.5)
Daily mean °F (°C)	13.5 (−10.3)	15.5 (−9.2)	23.8 (−4.6)	36.3 (2.4)	48.6 (9.2)	57.3 (14.1)	62.0 (16.7)	60.8 (16.0)	54.1 (12.3)	42.1 (5.6)	29.9 (−1.2)	19.8 (−6.8)	38.6 (3.7)
Mean daily minimum °F (°C)	6.0 (−14.4)	7.0 (−13.9)	15.0 (−9.4)	26.7 (−2.9)	38.3 (3.5)	47.7 (8.7)	52.9 (11.6)	51.8 (11.0)	45.1 (7.3)	33.8 (1.0)	23.6 (−4.7)	13.1 (−10.5)	30.1 (−1.1)
Average precipitation inches (mm)	3.53 (90)	2.94 (75)	3.53 (90)	4.10 (104)	4.62 (117)	5.68 (144)	5.85 (149)	5.28 (134)	4.33 (110)	5.54 (141)	4.17 (106)	4.31 (109)	53.88 (1,369)
Source: PRISM Climate Group
