= Mink Brook =

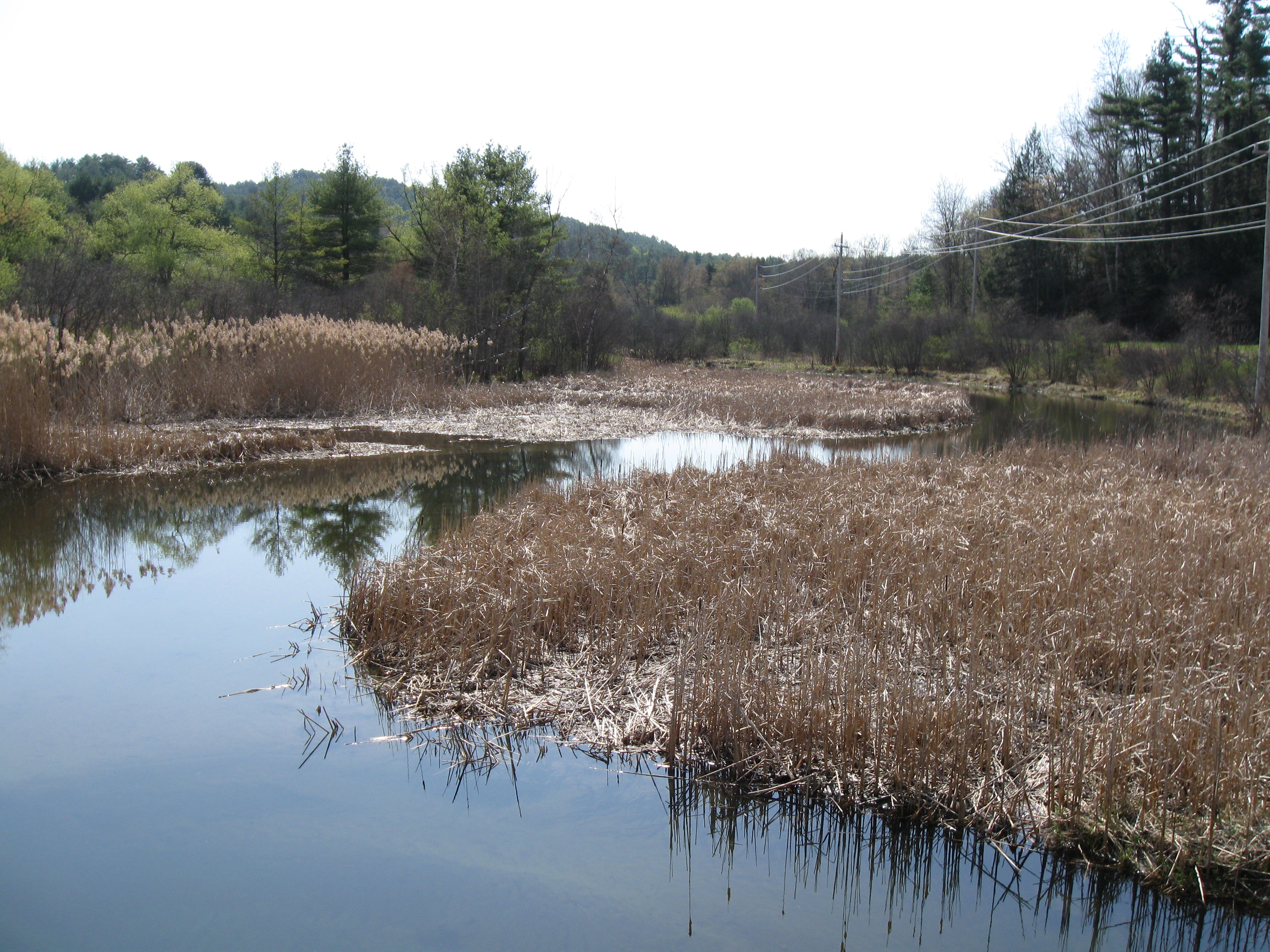
- Mink Brook at Route 10 in Hanover, NH

- Location within New Hampshire Location within the United States

Location
- Country: United States
- State: New Hampshire
- County: Grafton
- Town: Hanover

Physical characteristics
- Source: Moose Mountain
  - location: Hanover
  - coordinates: 43°40′35″N 72°10′14″W
  - elevation: 1,510 ft (460 m)
- Mouth: Connecticut River
  - location: Hanover
  - coordinates: 43°41′46″N 72°17′57″W
  - elevation: 383 ft (117 m)
- Length: 9.5 mi (15.3 km)

Mink Brook is a 9.5-mile-long (15.3 km) stream in western New Hampshire in the United States. It is a tributary of the Connecticut River, which flows to Long Island Sound.

Mink Brook lies entirely in the town of Hanover. It rises on the western slopes of Moose Mountain and flows west, through the village of Etna, before reaching the Connecticut just north of the Hanover-Lebanon municipal boundary.

== See also ==
- List of rivers of New Hampshire
