= Jeffrey Hamelman =

American baker

Jeffrey Hamelman (born 1950 or 1951) is an American baker. He is the director of the King Arthur Flour bakery. In 2004, he published the book Bread: A Baker's Book of Techniques and Recipes. He received The Guild’s Golden Baguette Award, now called the Raymond Calvel Award, from the Bread Bakers Guild of America.

Hamelman was raised in New York and Pennsylvania. One of his grandmothers comes from Poland, as he mentioned in his book.
