= J. P. Nettl =

Historian

John Peter Nettl
- Born: February 12, 1926; Czechoslovakia
- Died: October 25, 1968 (aged 42); Hanover, New Hampshire, U.S.
- Resting place: Cuddesdon, Oxfordshire, England
- Education: Marlborough College
- Alma mater: University of Oxford
- Occupations: Historian, author, academic
- Known for: Biography of Rosa Luxemburg

John Peter Nettl (February 12, 1926 – October 25, 1968) was a Czechoslovak-born British historian. He was best known for his two-volume biography of Rosa Luxemburg, which The New York Times described as a classic work that did full justice to her political activity, context, theoretical contributions, and personality.

Nettl was born in 1926 in Czechoslovakia. He went to school in England at Marlborough College and the University of Oxford. He served in British Army intelligence during the Second World War. He worked briefly for his family's business, but in 1963 returned to academia as a reader in politics and social studies at Oxford then the University of Leeds.

Nettl and his wife, Marietta, had three children. He had recently accepted a chair of sociology at the University of Pennsylvania when he was one of the 32 people killed (out of 42 total passengers and crew) when Northeast Airlines Flight 946 crashed in Hanover, New Hampshire, on October 25, 1968. Nettl was traveling with his wife, who survived and was treated for a fractured arm.

== Works ==
- The Eastern Zone and Soviet Policy in Germany (1951)
- Rosa Luxemburg (1966)
- The Soviet Achievement (1967)
- International Systems and the Modernization of Societies (1968, with Roland Robertson)
