= Hanover Town Library =

- U.S. National Register of Historic Places
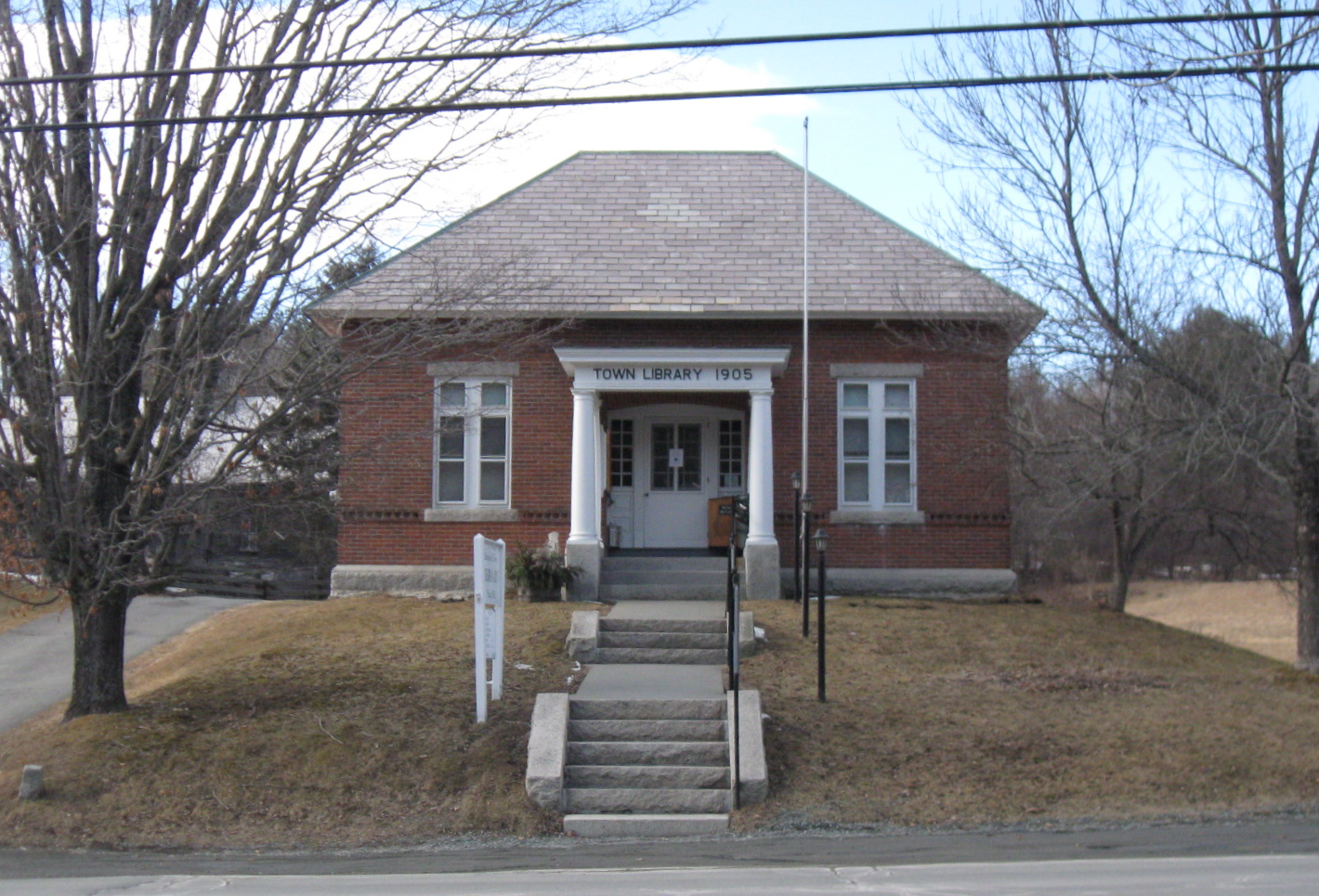

- Location within New Hampshire Location within the United States
- Location: 130 Etna Rd., Hanover, New Hampshire
- Coordinates: 43°41′41″N 72°13′6″W
- Area: less than one acre
- Built: 1905
- Architect: Fletcher, Robert E.
- Architectural style: Colonial Revival
- NRHP reference No.: 97000371
- Added to NRHP: April 25, 1997

The Hanover Town Library, more commonly known as the Etna Library, is a historic library located at 130 Etna Road in Hanover, New Hampshire, United States. It primarily serves the Etna section of the town; the Classical Revival building it occupies was the first purpose-built library building in the town, and is listed on the National Register of Historic Places. It is a modest brick building, designed by Dartmouth College professor Robert E. Fletcher and built in 1905.

== Description and history ==
The Etna Library is located in the village of Etna in eastern Hanover, on the north side of Etna Road near King Road. It is a single-story masonry structure, built of red brick with granite trim and covered by a hip roof. Its main facade is three bays wide, with paired narrow sash windows on either side of the center entrance. Each sash window is topped by a transom window, and the paired windows have rough-cut stone lintels and sills. The entrance is sheltered by a projecting portico, which has round Tuscan columns supporting a corniced entablature. The original entrance is a single door, set in a large segmented-arch opening with flanking double-width sidelight windows. The building has a rear projection that was originally designed to house a vault for town documents.

Hanover's first lending library, a private endeavor, was established in 1801, and it (and later similar organizations) were based in the centrally located Etna village through the 19th century. In 1898, the town voted to establish a public library, which was seeded with these earlier collections. In March 1905, the town appropriated funds for the construction of a building, which was completed later that year. It was designed by Robert E. Fletcher, a Dartmouth College professor of engineering. In 2013–2014, the land surrounding the library was purchased by the Town of Hanover. An addition to the back of the library building and a parking lot next to the library was also built at this time.

The Etna Library shares a library catalog and a library card with reciprocal borrowing privileges with Hanover's other library, The Howe Library, but is otherwise a completely separate institution. The Etna Library is the official public library for the town of Hanover and is governed by three ballot-elected Trustees who serve three-year terms.

== See also ==
- National Register of Historic Places listings in Grafton County, New Hampshire
