= Moose Mountain (New Hampshire) =

Mountain ridge in Hanover, New Hampshire, United States

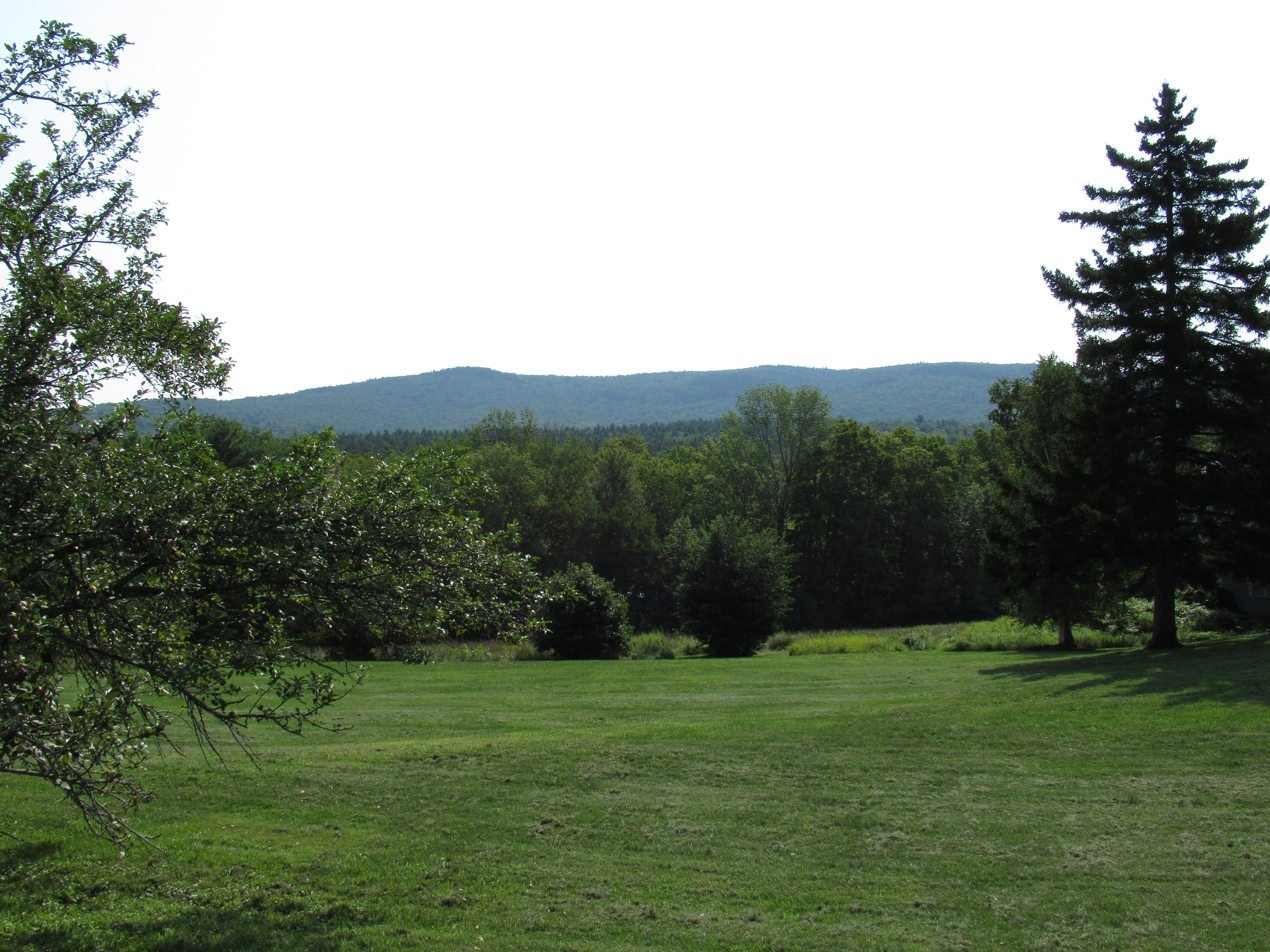
- Moose Mountain from Hanover Center Road

Highest point
- Elevation: 2303+ ft (702+ m)
- Prominence: 1,423 ft (434 m)
- Coordinates: 43°44′05″N 72°08′27″W

Geography
- Location within New Hampshire
- Location: Hanover, Grafton County, New Hampshire, U.S.
- Topo map: USGS Canaan

Moose Mountain is an 8-mile (13 km)-long ridge located in the eastern part of the town of Hanover in Grafton County, New Hampshire. (Note: Moose Mountain in Hanover is unrelated to the Moose Mountains Reservation in Middleton and Brookfield, New Hampshire.) The mountain is flanked to the north by Holts Ledge, at 2,110 feet (640 m), and to the south (across Mascoma Lake) by Shaker Mountain, at 1,690 feet (520 m). It is traversed by the Appalachian Trail, a 2,170-mile (3,490 km) National Scenic Trail from Georgia to Maine. Moose Mountain is outside the White Mountain National Forest, but the trail runs through a narrow corridor along the ridge which is administered by the U.S. Forest Service. The trail can be accessed from the south along Three Mile Road in Hanover, and from the north along Goose Pond Road in Lyme, New Hampshire.

Moose Mountain has two summits, slightly over 1 mile apart. The higher summit, North Peak, has an elevation of 2,303 feet (702 m), while a subsidiary summit known as South Peak has an elevation of 2,293 feet (699 m). The mountain lies entirely within the Connecticut River watershed, with runoff flowing ultimately to Long Island Sound. The north end of the mountain drains into Hewes Brook, which enters the Connecticut River in Lyme, and most of the western side of the ridge drains into Mink Brook, a tributary of the Connecticut that flows through Hanover. The east side and extreme southwestern side of Moose Mountain drain into tributaries of the Mascoma River, which flows to the Connecticut through Lebanon, New Hampshire. Goose Pond is a large lake that sits to the east of Moose Mountain.

Northeast Airlines Flight 946 crashed into the side of Moose Mountain in 1968, resulting in the deaths of 32 passengers and crew.
