= Becker's sign =

- Differential diagnosis: Aortic insufficiency, Graves' disease

Becker's sign, or Becker's phenomenon, is the presence of visible (through an ophthalmoscope) pulsation of retinal arteries, found in patients with aortic insufficiency or Graves' disease.

The sign was named after Otto Heinrich Enoch Becker.

== See also ==
- Corrigan's pulse
- De Musset's sign
- Muller's sign
- Quincke's sign
- Traube's sign
- Duroziez's sign
- Hill's sign
- Mayne's sign
