= Arthur Böckenhauer =

German Nazi SA general (1899–1953)

SA-Stabschef Adjutant Office Supreme SA Leadership (OSAF)
- In office 1 September 1939 – 8 May 1945
- SA-Stabschef: Viktor Lutze; Wilhelm Schepmann

Chief, Main Office (OSAF)
- In office 1 June 1938 – 31 August 1939

SA-Führer SA-Gruppe Niedersachsen
- In office 1 November 1937 – 31 May 1938
- Preceded by: Siegfried Kasche

Chief, Courts and Legal Office (OSAF)
- In office 1 April 1935 – 31 October 1937

Additional positions
- 1936–1941: People's Court Judge
- 1932–1933 1936–1945: Reichstag Deputy
- 1931–1933: Hamburg Parliament member

Personal details
- Born: 13 September 1899 Hamburg, German Empire
- Died: 18 April 1953 (aged 53) Hamburg, West Germany
- Party: Nazi Party
- Other political affiliations: Deutschvölkischer Schutz- und Trutzbund
- Occupation: Soldier
- Civilian awards: Golden Party Badge

Military service
- Allegiance: German Empire; Weimar Republic; Nazi Germany
- Branch/service: Imperial German Army; Freikorps; Reichswehr; German Army
- Years of service: 1917–1923; 1939–1945
- Rank: Unteroffizier; Major
- Unit: 96th Reserve Infantry Regiment; Infantry Regiment 31; Infantry Regiment 17; Infantry Regiment 6
- Battles/wars: World War I World War II
- Military awards: Iron Cross, 1st class Clasp to the Iron Cross, 2nd class

Arthur Böckenhauer (13 September 1899 – 18 April 1953) was a German soldier in the First World War who served in the Sturmabteilung, the Nazi Party paramilitary organization, and rose to the rank of SA-Obergruppenführer. He led the SA in Hamburg, Germany's second most-populous city, for a number of years and held several high-level staff positions in the Supreme SA Leadership (OSAF). He was also a Nazi politician, and was elected to the Hamburg Parliament and as a deputy to the Reichstag. He again served in the military during the Second World War.

== Early life and military service ==
Böckenhauer was born the son of a tailor in Hamburg. He attended the local Volksschule and a commercial training school. He completed an apprenticeship in the paper export business from 1913 to 1916 and, at the same time, completed pre-military training. He worked for a time in a Hamburg gunpowder factory and, in May 1917, he entered the Imperial German Army as a one-year volunteer with the 96th Reserve Infantry Regiment. In March 1918, he was transferred to Infantry Regiment 31 and fought on the western front in the First World War. He became an Unteroffizier, was wounded and was awarded the Iron Cross, 2nd class. After the end of the war, Böckenhauer remained in the military and became a member of the Freikorps between 1919 and 1920. He was accepted into the Reichswehr, attended the army technical school and served in the infantry regiments 17 and 6 between 1921 and July 1923 when he was discharged from military service.

== Political activity under the Weimar Republic ==
Between 1920 and 1922, Böckenhauer was a member of the Deutschvölkischer Schutz- und Trutzbund, the largest and most influential antisemitic and völkisch organization in the Weimar Republic. He joined the Nazi Party's Ortsgruppe (local group) in Hamburg and its paramilitary group, the Sturmabteilung (SA) on 1 October 1922. As a very early Party member, he would later be awarded the Golden Party Badge. From October 1922 to February 1923, he was the first SA-Führer in Hamburg. He then founded and led a separate but allied organization, the Blücher Gymnastics, Sports and Hiking Association of 1923. After the Nazi Party and the SA were banned following the Beer Hall Putsch in November 1923, this became a front organization for the SA. Böckenhauer worked as a bank employee between 1923 and 1924 and was named a Gauredner (Gau orator) making propaganda speeches on behalf of the Party.

After the ban was lifted, Böckenhauer rejoined the SA on 1 March 1925, and again resumed the SA leadership in Hamburg. Also in March 1925, he was hired as a police officer in the Hamburg Ordnungspolizei and served on the staff as a training officer. However, due to his political activity, he was dismissed from the police service on 3 November 1926. He then worked at various occupations until 1930, including as a warehouse laborer. On 1 April 1926, Böckenhauer established the first SS unit in Hamburg and became the SS-Führer in the city. He had conflicts with the political leadership, chiefly Gauleiter Josef Klant, who was some 30 years older and more moderate than Böckenhauer. Klant resisted SA expansion and its attempts to remain independent from the political organization. Klant was removed as Gauleiter in November 1926 for his inability to restore stability to the Gau.

Böckenhauer declined to accept the political leadership, which went to Albert Krebs. In January 1927, Böckenhauer was named Gauverwalter (Gau administrator) of Gausturm Nordmark, which encompassed the Gaue of Hamburg, Schleswig-Holstein and Lüneburg-Stade. In March 1927, he also was named SA-Führer of SA-Standarte II in Hamburg, as well as SS-Führer Nordmark. From 21 August 1927, he became the SA-Führer Nordmark. In February 1928, Böckenhauer failed in his first bid for elective office as a member of the Hamburgische Bürgerschaft. Around this time, Böckenhauer was convicted of assault and sentenced to three months in jail, though he obtained an early release through an amnesty. Throughout this period, there was much continued infighting among the Nazi leadership in Hamburg and Böckenhauer sought to undermine Gauleiter Krebs, whom he viewed as a rival. He spied on him, questioned his every decision and spread rumors of incompetence, financial mismanagement and corruption. After Böckenhauer ordered the SA to stop protecting Nazi meeting halls, Krebs succeeded in having him expelled from the SA and the Party on 8 May 1928.

Sometime after Krebs was removed as Gauleiter, Böckenhauer was readmitted into the Party in June 1930 and into the SA in October. His official entry date was backdated to 1 January 1927 (membership number 55,437). Now a full-time SA official, he was assigned as an adjutant and treasurer at Gausturm Nordmark in November 1930 and, by 15 April 1931, he was promoted to SA-Oberführer and again named the SA-Führer in Hamburg. On 27 September 1931, Böckenhauer was elected to a seat in the Bürgerschaft which he retained until March 1933. At the July 1932 parliamentary election, Böckenhauer was elected to the Reichstag as a candidate of the Nazi Party from electoral constituency 34 (Hamburg). He was reelected in November 1932 and March 1933, and served until the dissolution of 14 October 1933.

== Career in Nazi Germany ==
Following Adolf Hitler's seizure of power, Böckenhauer was promoted to SA-Gruppenführer on 1 March 1933 and, on 14 March, was named the Sonderkommissar (Special Commissioner) of the Supreme SA Leadership (OSAF) to Hamburg, a post he held until 1 March 1934. From 1 July 1933 to 14 September, he was the SA-Führer of SA-Gruppe Hansa, based in Hamburg. He next served on the staff of SA-Obergruppe II in Stettin (today, Szczecin) through the end of February 1934. From 1 March 1934 to 31 March 1935, he was a department chief within the Political Office at OSAF in Munich, where he was responsible for handling the affairs of the SA-Feldjäger Corps. In the aftermath of the Night of the Long Knives of 30 June to 2 July 1934, Böckenhauer, on 1 August, became the chairman of an SA-Sondergericht (special court) that established special commissions in each SA-Gruppe to investigate and purge the SA. Hitler's order establishing this court charged it with investigating "all circumstances by which SA leaders have rendered themselves unworthy of membership of the SA corps of leaders", specifically citing immorality, materialism, embezzlement, drunkenness and debauchery. From 1 April 1935 to 31 October 1937, Böckenhauer served as Chief of the Courts and Legal Office at OSAF. In the period from 1 May to 30 November 1936, he was also acting Chief of the Personnel Office. While serving on the OSAF staff, he was promoted to SA-Obergruppenführer on 9 November 1936.

Böckenhauer was again elected to the Reichstag at the March 1936 election from constituency 18 (Westphalia South). Reelected in 1938 from constituency 16 (South Hanover-Braunschweig), he remained a member until the fall of the Nazi dictatorship in May 1945. On 5 January 1936, he received a five-year appointment as an honorary law judge at the People's Court. From 1 November 1937 to 31 May 1938, Böckenhauer left his staff post at OSAF to again take up a field command as the SA-Führer of SA-Gruppe Niedersachsen with headquarters in Hanover. On 1 June 1938, he returned to OSAF, where he held the position of chief of the Hauptamt (Main Office) staff. On 1 September 1939, he was assigned to the Office of the Adjutant of the SA-Stabschef, serving Viktor Lutze and, after his death in May 1943, Wilhelm Schepmann until the end of the Nazi regime.

After the outbreak of the Second World War, Böckenhauer entered military service in the German Army as an Unteroffizier of reserves. He took part in the Battle of France in 1940, eventually rising to the rank of Major on 1 May 1944. He was awarded the Iron Cross 1st class and the clasp to the Iron Cross 2nd class. Little is documented of his postwar life and he died in Hamburg in April 1953.

== SA ranks ==
SA ranks
Date	Rank
1 November 1930	SA-Standartenführer
15 April 1931	SA-Oberführer
1 March 1933	SA-Gruppenführer
9 November 1936	SA-Obergruppenführer

== Character assessment ==
In his book, The Infancy of Nazism: The Memoirs of ex-Gauleiter Albert Krebs, 1923-1933, Krebs described his early adversary's character this way:

[Böckenhauer] was the complete representative of the breed of man who finds only in politics the opportunity to acquire and exercise power. In this connection he was never troubled for an instant by the question of the moral justification of power … [he] grasped for power to satisfy his burning but wholly egotistical ambition. To him Nazism meant little more than a chance to develop and use his own powers and abilities … Naturally, these characteristics did not make Böckenhauer a comfortable party member. It was his ambition, rather than any ideological doubts or reservations, that led to his repeated quarrels with officials of the civilian sector of the party and to consequent disciplinary measures against him. I had to expel him from the party once myself. Nevertheless, he always found his way back into the party again and in increasingly higher positions …

== Sources ==
- Information about Arthur Böckenhauer in the Reichstag database
- Höhne, Heinz (1971). The Order of the Death's Head: The Story of Hitler's SS. New York: Ballantine Books. ISBN 0-345-28333-3.
- Krebs, Albert (1976). The Infancy of Nazism: The Memoirs of ex-Gauleiter Albert Krebs, 1923-1933. New Viewpoints. ISBN 978-0-531-05376-8.
- Miller, Michael D.; Schulz, Andreas (2015). Leaders of the Storm Troops. Vol. 1. Solihull, England: Helion & Company. ISBN 978-1-909-98287-1.
- Orlow, Dietrich (1969). The History of the Nazi Party: 1919–1933. University of Pittsburgh Press. ISBN 0-8229-3183-4.
- Stockhorst, Erich (1985). 5000 Köpfe: Wer War Was im 3. Reich. Arndt. p.65. ISBN 978-3-887-41116-9.
