= Ernst Boepple =

German Nazi war criminal (1887–1950)

- Born: 30 November 1887; Betzingen, German Empire
- Died: 15 December 1950 (aged 63); Montelupich Prison, Kraków, Polish People's Republic
- Cause of death: Execution by hanging
- Military career
- Allegiance: German Empire; Nazi Germany
- Branch: Imperial German Army; Schutzstaffel
- Service years: 1914–1918; 1934–1945
- Rank: Oberleutnant; SS-Oberführer
- Commands: Headed construction of gas chambers during Aktion T4, and at Sobibor and Treblinka extermination camps during Operation Reinhard

Ernst Boepple (30 November 1887 – 15 December 1950) was a German schoolteacher and publisher who became a Nazi official and SS-Oberführer. He served as the deputy to Josef Bühler in occupied Poland during World War II and the Holocaust. After the end of the war, he was executed in Poland for war crimes.

== Early life ==
Boepple earned his Abitur in 1905 at the Gymnasium in Reutlingen. Then he studied languages and history at several universities: University of Tübingen, University of Paris, University of Oxford, and the University of London and earned his doctorate in 1915 with the doctoral thesis: Frederick the Great's Relation to Württemberg.

After performing mandatory military service as a one-year volunteer in 1912, he was employed as a schoolteacher in the Württemberg public school system from 1913 to 1920, with a break for service in the First World War. He fought with the Imperial German Army infantry and was discharged with the rank of Oberleutnant in 1919. As an advocate of German nationalism, Boepple became a member of the Pan-German League and, in 1919, was a co-founder of the Deutschvölkischer Schutz- und Trutzbund, the largest and most active antisemitic organization in the new Weimar Republic. He also co-founded the German Workers' Party (DAP) in 1919 (member number 15), which was later renamed the National Socialist German Workers' Party (NSDAP). In November 1923, Boepple took part in the failed Beer Hall Putsch, and he joined the re-founded Nazi Party in 1925 with membership number 3,600.

== Director of Nazi publishing enterprise ==
Boepple became a co-worker of the publisher Julius Friedrich Lehmann. In 1919, he took over the Deutsche Volksverlag publishing house, which had been established by Lehmann. There he published Anton Drexler's My Political Awakening. The Deutsche Volksverlag published a large section of the early formative Nazi literature including:

- Rudolf Jung: National Socialism. Its Foundations, Its Development and Its Goals, 1919 (Der nationale Sozialismus. Seine Grundlagen, sein Werdegang und seine Ziele)
- Wilhelm Meister (i.e. Dr. Paul Bang): Jewry's debt-book - a German accounting, 1919 (Judas Schuldbuch - eine deutsche Abrechnung)
- Dr. Ferdinand Werner: Make Way for Truth! A Reckoning with Jewry and its accomplices, 1919 (Der Wahrheit eine Gasse! Eine Abrechnung mit dem Judentum und seinen Helfern)
- Minister Karl Gerecke: Biblical anti-Semitism: Jewry's character in world history, guilt and the end in prophet Jona's reflection, 1920 (Biblischer Antisemitismus. Der Juden weltgeschichtlicher Charakter, Schuld und Ende in des Propheten Jona Judenspiegel)
- Maria Groener: Schopenhauer and the Jews, 1920 (Schopenhauer und die Juden)
- Dr. Hans Grunsky: Richard Wagner and the Jews, 1920 (Richard Wagner und die Juden)
- Alfred Rosenberg: Immorality in the Talmud, 1920 (Unmoral im Talmud)
- Emil Kloth: Soul searching - Reflections of a social democratic trade unionist about the politics of social democracy, 1920 (Einkehr - Betrachtungen eines sozialdemokratischen Gewerkschaftlers über die Politik der deutschen Sozialdemokratie)
- Dr. Paul Tafel: The new Germany. A socialist state on a national foundation, 1920 (Das neue Deutschland. Ein Rätestaat auf nationaler Grundlage)
- Fridrich Andersen (one of the founders of the German Christians): The German Saviour, 1921 (Der deutsche Heiland)
- Dietrich Eckart, Otto von Kursell: Austria under Jewry's star, Russia's gravedigger, 1921 (Österreich unter Judas Stern, Totengräber Russlands)
- Dr. Max Maurenbrecher: Goethe and the Jews, 1921 (Goethe und die Juden)
- Dr. Alfred Falb: Luther and the Jews, 1921 (Luther und die Juden)
- Hugo Christoph Meyer: The Jew and his Slavery, 1921 (Der Jude und sein Sklaventum)
- Ottokar Stauf von der March: Jewry in the Opinions of the Ages, 1921 (Die Juden im Urteil der Zeiten)
- Otto Armin: The Jews in the War-Business and the War-Economics, 1921 (Die Juden in den Kriegs-Gesellschaften und in der Kriegs-Wirtschaft)
- Adolf Bartels: Hebbel and the Jews, 1922 (Hebbel und die Juden)
- Alfred Rosenberg: Being, principles, and goals of the National Socialist German Worker's Party, 1922 (Wesen, Grundsätze und Ziele der Nationalsozialistischen Deutschen Arbeiterpartei)
- Dr. Albrecht Wirth: Crosswise our present time, 1922 (Quer durch die Gegenwart)
- Alfred Rosenberg: The Plague in Russia. Bolshevism, its heads, henchmen, and victims, 1922 (Pest in Russland. Der Bolschewismus, seine Häupter, Handlanger und Opfer)
- Alfred Rosenberg: Bolshevism, hunger, death, 1922 (Bolschewismus, Hunger, Tod)

When Hans Schemm died in March 1935 after an aircraft crash, Boepple became the acting Bavarian Minister for Culture until November 1936 and then the State Secretary in the ministry.

== Activity in Poland during World War II ==
Following the invasion of Poland, he returned to the military in 1940. On 1 September 1941, he was assigned to the General Government in occupied Poland, serving as deputy to State Secretary Josef Bühler. Boepple was deeply implicated in the Final Solution as the deputy to Bühler and also as an SS-Oberführer (senior colonel) in the Schutzstaffel. In the final months the war, after the Germans had been driven out of Poland, he returned to Bavaria as head of the state chancellery in April 1945.

== Post-war prosecution and execution ==
Several months after Germany's surrender, Boepple was arrested by U.S. soldiers in Bavaria. He was extradited to Poland in 1947, where he was sentenced to death by a Polish court on 14 December 1949. Boepple was hanged on 15 December 1950.

== Publications ==
- Friedrich des Großen Verhältnis zu Württemberg (i.e. Frederick the Great's Relation to Württemberg), Dissertation, C. A. Seyfried, 1915
- Die Judenfrage und der deutsche Buchhandel (i.e. The Jewish Question and the German book trade), Deutscher Volksverlag, 1920
- Zwischen Front und Heimat: Zum Vierjahrestag des Generalgouvernements (i.e. Between Front and Homeland: Fourth Anniversary of the General Government), Pressechef d. Regierg d. Generalgouvernements, 1943
