= Adlerschild des Deutschen Reiches =

German honorary award

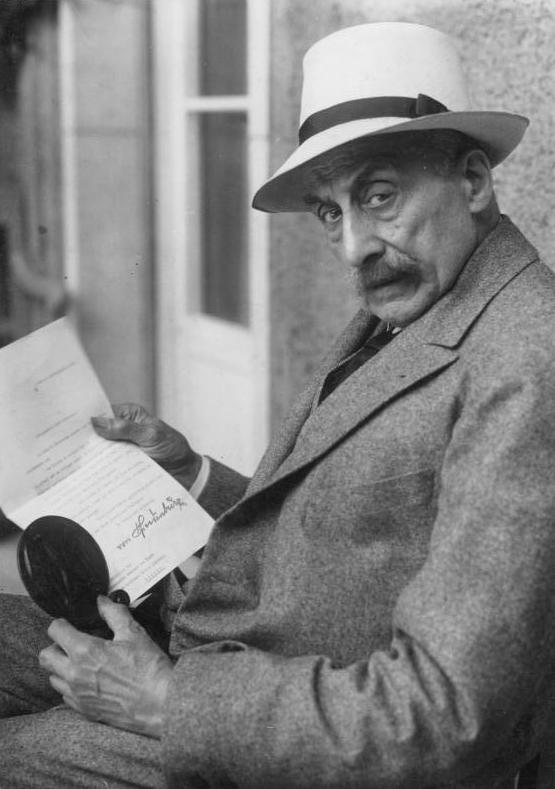
Max Liebermann with the Adlerschild awarded to him by President Paul von Hindenburg.

The Adlerschild des Deutschen Reiches (English: Eagle Shield of the German Reich) was an honorary award (German: Ehrengabe) granted by the German president for scholarly or artistic achievements. It was introduced during the Weimar Republic, under President Friedrich Ebert and continued under Nazi Germany. It was a metal disc with a German imperial eagle on a pedestal. It was a high and infrequently awarded honor, received by around 70 people in total.

== Recipients during the Weimar Republic ==
Article 109, section 3 of the Weimar Constitution entitled "Orders and honours may not be given by the state" enacted a ban on honorific orders. Nevertheless, there was a desire for the state to be able to confer symbolic honours and the honorific award of the Adlerschild des Deutschen Reiches was created to meet this desire. It consisted of a 108 mm wide medal of cast bronze, mounted on a bronze pedestal and inscribed on the reverse with an individualised honorific inscription. The designer of the Adlerschild des Deutschen Reiches was Josef Wackerle. The award was to be given to outstanding individuals in the realms of art, culture, scholarship, science and the economy.

The award was made by hand written decree of the President. The Ministry of the Interior made decisions about the honour at the direction of the Reichskunstwart Edwin Redslob, who was also responsible for the design. According to Redslob, the form of the eagle expressed the "idea of the Reich." In total, the Adlerschild des Deutschen Reiches was awarded to twenty one people during the period of the Weimar Republic. They were:

1. Gerhart Hauptmann (15 November 1922)
2. Paul Wagner (7 March 1923)
3. Harry Plate (28 August 1925)
4. Emil Warburg (9 March 1926)
5. Adolf von Harnack (7 May 1926)
6. Max Liebermann (20 July 1927)
7. Max Planck (23 April 1928)
8. Hans Delbrück (11 November 1928)
9. Ulrich von Wilamowitz-Moellendorff (22 December 1928)
10. Wilhelm Kahl (17 June 1929)
11. Lujo Brentano (18 December 1929)
12. Oskar von Miller (7 May 1930)
13. Friedrich Schmidt-Ott (4 June 1930)
14. Theodor Lewald (18 August 1930)
15. Georg Dehio (22 November 1930)
16. Robert Bosch (23 September 1931)
17. Walter Simons (24 September 1931)
18. Carl Duisberg (25 September 1931)
19. Max Sering (18 January 1932)
20. Ernst Brandes (11 March 1932)
21. Adolph Goldschmidt (1933)

== Recipients during National Socialism ==
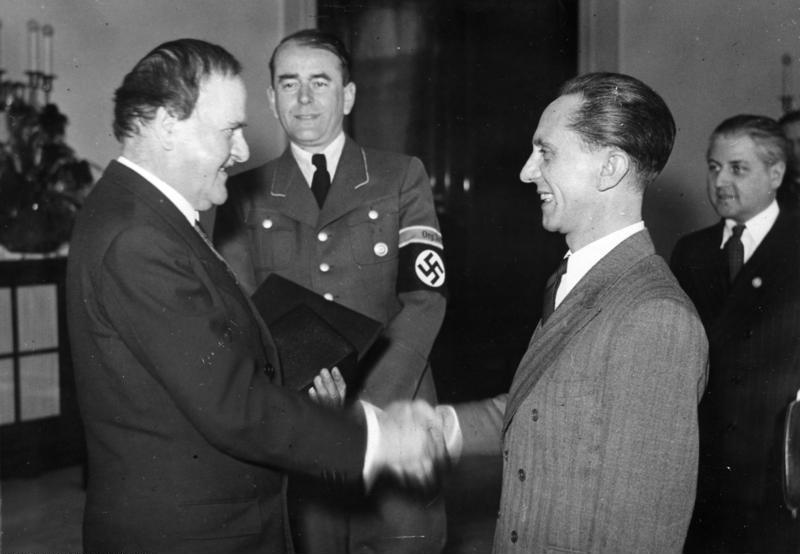
Award of the Adlerschild to Wilhelm Kreis in 1943

The Adlerschild des Deutschen Reiches continued to be awarded during the Nazi period. From 1934, the eagle designed by Josef Wackerle was replaced by the Imperial Eagle with a swastika, symbols closely connected with Nazi ideology. The reverse continued to feature an individualised inscription, but was also inscribed Der Führer und Reichskanzler (From 1940, simply Der Führer). Otherwise it was unchanged.

1. Philipp Lenard (6 June 1933)
2. Eduard Schwartz (22 August 1933)
3. Friedrich von Müller (17 September 1933)
4. Werner Körte (21 October 1933)
5. Wilhelm Dörpfeld (26 December 1933)
6. Hermann Stehr (16 February 1934)
7. Reinhold Seeberg (5 April 1934)
8. Hugo Hergesell (29 May 1934)
9. Richard Strauss (11 June 1934)
10. Adolf Schmidt (23 July 1934)
11. Theodor Wiegand (30 October 1934)
12. Julius Friedrich Lehmann (28 November 1934)
13. Heinrich Finke (13 June 1935)
14. Ludwig Aschoff (10 January 1936)
15. Gustav Tammann (20 April 1936)
16. Ludolf von Krehl (25 June 1936)
17. Erich Marcks (17 November 1936)
18. August Bier (24 November 1936)
19. Wladimir Peter Köppen (28 March 1937)
20. Emil Kirdorf (8 April 1937)
21. Adolf Bartels (1 May 1937)
22. Bernhard Nocht (4 November 1937)
23. Alexander Koenig (20 February 1938)
24. Adalbert Czerny (25 March 1938)
25. Henry Ford (1938)
26. Erwin Guido Kolbenheyer (1938)
27. Robert von Ostertag (20 April 1939)
28. Friedrich Karl Kleine (14 May 1939)
29. Albert Pietzsch (28 June 1939)
30. Heinrich Sohnrey (19 June 1939)
31. Julius Dorpmüller (24 July 1939)
32. Arthur Kampf (28 September 1939)
33. Karl Muck (22 October 1939)
34. Gustav Krupp von Bohlen und Halbach (7 August 1940)
35. Paul Kehr (28 December 1940)
36. Heinrich Schnee (4 February 1941)
37. Albert Brackmann (24 June 1941)
38. Ernst Poensgen (17 October 1941)
39. Wilhelm Kreis (17 March 1943)
40. Gustav Bauer (1 October 1944)
41. Hermann Röchling (12 November 1942)
42. Alfred Hugenberg (3 March 1943)
43. Ernst Rüdin (19 April 1944)
44. Eugen Fischer (June 1944)
45. Paul Schultze-Naumburg (10 June 1944)

== Bibliography ==
- Christian Zentner, Friedemann Bedürftig (1991). The Encyclopedia of the Third Reich. Macmillan, New York. ISBN 0-02-897502-2
- Wolfgang Steguweit: Der »Adlerschild des Deutschen Reiches«. In: Berlinische Monatsschrift. Heft 6. Edition Luisenstadt, 2000, ISSN 0944-5560, pp. 182–187 (online)
