= Pedro Francisco da Costa Alvarenga =

Brazilian-Portuguese physician

Pedro Francisco da Costa Alvarenga CavTE ComC OSE
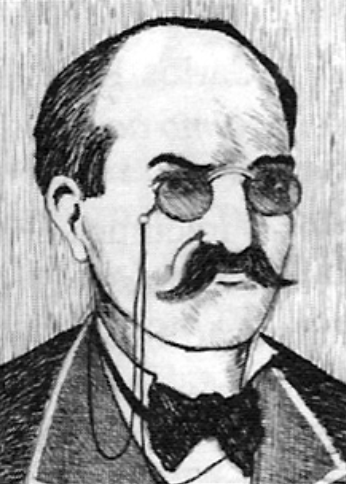
- Born: 1826; Oeiras, Piauí, Brazil
- Died: 14 July 1883 (aged 56–57); Sacramento, Lisbon, Portugal
- Occupations: Physician and professor

Pedro Francisco da Costa Alvarenga (1826 – 14 July 1883) was a Brazilian-born Portuguese medical doctor. He taught Materia Medica at the Lisbon Medical Surgical School and left several works dealing chiefly with cardiology. He was a founder and main editor of the Gazeta Médica de Lisboa.

He became notable for his clinical work during the cholera morbus and yellow fever epidemics in Lisbon in 1856 and 1857, respectively. Alvarenga also introduced the sphygmograph, the first non-intrusive device used to estimate blood pressure, to Portugal.

Alvarenga discovered the double crural murmur, a sign of aortic insufficiency (published in 1855, translated to French in 1856), almost a decade before Duroziez.

== Distinctions ==
=== National orders ===
- Knight of the Order of the Tower and Sword
- Commander of the Order of Christ
- Officer of the Order of Saint James of the Sword

=== Foreign orders ===
- Commander of the Order of Leopold (Belgium)
- Commander of the Order of Charles III (Spain)
- Grand Cross of the Order of Isabella the Catholic (Spain)

== Alvarenga Prize ==
The Alvarenga Prize (Swedish: Alvarengas pris), named after Alvarenga, is awarded by the Swedish Medical Society.
