= Alfred Roth (politician) =

German politician

Alfred Roth (born 27 April 1879 in Stuttgart – died 9 October 1948 in Hamburg) was a German politician and writer noted for his antisemitism. He was sometimes known by his pseudonym Otto Arnim. Away from politics, he was a leading figure in the Commercial Employees Union.

== Early years ==
The son of a photographer, Roth trained as an accountant and worked in that capacity for an ironmonger. In 1897 he took up a role in the office of the Deutschnationaler Handlungsgehilfen-Verband (DHV), a white-collar union, and from 1908 to 1911 he edited their journal Deutsche Handelwache.

Briefly a member of the rightist Deutsche Jungbund in 1896, Roth was strongly influenced by the antisemitism that dominated the DHV and became politically active. He met Georg Ritter von Schönerer in 1904 and became an enthusiastic supporter of his pan-German ideas and was an unsuccessful parliamentary candidate for the German Social Party in 1907. He also held membership of the Pan-German League

== Deutschvölkischer Schutz und Trutzbund ==
Roth was active in Theodor Fritsch's Reichshammerbund (Imperial Hammer League) before serving as an officer in World War I. He was wounded several times and awarded a number of decorations, before being discharged in 1917 as an invalid. After the death of Karl August Hellwig in 1914 he became leader of this group and he used this body to build up the strongly antisemitic Deutschvölkischer Schutz und Trutzbund (DVSTB), which he formed in 1919 by fusing the League with other groups. As leader of the DVSTB, he became noted for his propaganda work and was credited with attracting some 200,000 members to the group by the time it was banned in 1922 following the murder of Walther Rathenau. He was especially prone to attacking Zionism and regularly quoted Zionist works as proof that Jews did not belong in Germany. The DVSTB was the single most important producer of antisemitic and Völkisch material in northern Germany, and through this group he co-operated with the Nazi Party, which fulfilled a similar role in the south of the country.

He also became a member of the German National People's Party (DNVP), briefly sitting in the Reichstag for them in 1924.

== Later years ==
Roth drifted from the DNVP, whilst the DVSTB had been dissolved in 1922 following the murder of Walther Rathenau. He established a new group based in Württemberg, the Deutscher Befreiungs-Bund, although this group and another he led, the Vereinigte Vaterländische Verbände, struggled for influence. He maintained his own journal, Reichs-Sturmfahne, until 1928 when he was forced to close it down and return to work as a publisher.

Roth threw in his lot with the Nazi Party, although he gained no real status, a failed candidacy in the local election in Hamburg in 1932 being his only noteworthy contribution. He held no office in Nazi Germany, although in 1934 he was awarded 1,000 Reichsmarks by the Nazi government for his role in the DVSTB, and in 1936 he was publicly acknowledged for his earlier role "in the völkisch awakening of the German people".

He survived the Second World War as a private citizen and died of natural causes in Hamburg in 1948.

== Writing ==
In 1919, he published a book, The Jew in the Army which claimed that most Jews involved in the war were only involved as profiteers and spies. Roth claimed that his book was the result of the 1916 Judenzählung. He also blamed Jewish officers for imparting a defeatist mentality to their soldiers, with the book thus central to the stab-in-the-back legend.
