= Friedrich Bernreuther =

German police officer

Johann Friedrich Bernreuther
- Born: April 21, 1881
- Died: July 20, 1958 (aged 77)
- Education: From 1913 to 1919 he studied law.

Friedrich Bernreuther (born 1904) was a German police officer. From July 1 to October 10, 1945, he was a public claimant in denazification cases for Ansbach, a Bavarian city in Germany.

== Biography ==
Friedrich Bernreuther's parents were Johann Georg Bernreuther and Kunigunde Bernreuther.

== Career ==
At the beginning of the government of Kurt Eisner, Bernreuther's name appeared on an order to J. F. Lehmann to store 300 army pistols. In 1919, he became Assistant at the District Office in Rothenburg ob der Tauber. On November 1, 1919 he was transferred to the Police Directorate in Munich. In September 1921, he was appointed the head of the political department VI to succeed Wilhelm Frick.

=== Kidnapped with the Knilling government ===
On the evening of November 8, 1923, during the Beer Hall Putsch, Adolf Hitler proclaimed a National Revolution in Munich's Bürgerbräukeller with a group of armed SA men in front of about 3,000 people and declared the second Stresemann cabinet deposed. Sturmabteilung leader Rudolf Hess read a list of names of ministers and senior civil servants, drawn up by Hitler or Max Erwin von Scheubner-Richter. The list included Prime Minister Eugen von Knilling, Franz Xaver Schweyer (Ministers of the Interior), Franz Gürtner (Justice) and Johannes Wutzlhofer (Agriculture), Karl Mantel (police chief), and Bernreuther (head of the political police). All of them were taken hostage at the Bürgerbräukeller. At a later date, Josef Graf von Soden-Fraunhofen adviser to Rupprecht, Crown Prince of Bavaria, joined them. The head of the police department in the Interior Ministry, Josef Zetlmeier and Lieutenant Colonel Otto von Berchem were not found at the Bürgerbräukeller. The men were displaced by 30 armed SA students under the leadership of Rudolf Hess in the house of the publisher J. F. Lehmann in Holzkirchner Strasse 2. The majority of the Bavarian government was taken hostage. The criminal procedure of the German Reich specified a people's court in Bavaria as well as the Reichsgericht in Leipzig as competent, but the Bavarian government prevented the High Court Attorney from taking the case.

=== Feme murders as national interest ===
In 1928, journalist Werner Abel denounced Bernreuther for passport forgery, knowingly levying false police reports and perverting the course of justice in the Feme murders cases. In 1929, Bernreuther became Director of the Police in Regensburg. In 1941 he became a member of the Nazi Party.

=== Denazification ===
On May 4, 1945, the Allied Control Council named Bernreuther assistant public claimant in denazification cases for Ansbach. From July 1 to October 10, 1945 he was a public claimant in denazification cases for Ansbach.
