= Klant =

Klant is a Dutch language surname. Notable people with the name include:

- Joop Klant (1915–1994), Dutch economist
- Josef Klant (1869–1927), first Gauleiter of Hamburg
