= Paul Bang =

German politician and author (1879–1945)

Reichstag Deputy
- In office 12 November 1933 – 8 May 1945

State Secretary Reich Ministry of Economics
- In office 4 February 1933 – 30 June 1933
- Preceded by: Karl Schwarzkopf
- Succeeded by: Gottfried Feder

Reichstag Deputy
- In office 20 May 1928 – 12 November 1933

Personal details
- Born: 18 January 1879 Meissen, Kingdom of Saxony, German Empire
- Died: 31 December 1945 (aged 66) Hohenfichte, Germany
- Party: German National People's Party
- Other political affiliations: German Conservative Party; Pan-German League
- Education: Doctor of Law
- Alma mater: Leipzig University; Humboldt University of Berlin
- Occupation: Lawyer; Business executive

Paul Bang (18 January 1879 – 31 December 1945) was a German lawyer, civil servant, politician and author. A member of the conservative German National People's Party (DNVP), he served as a DNVP deputy in the Reichstag from 1928 to 1933. Under Nazi Germany, he was briefly the State Secretary in the Reich Ministry of Economics in 1933, remained in the Reichstag through Germany's surrender in the Second World War and died about seven months later.

== Early life and education ==
Bang was born at Meissen in the Kingdom of Saxony, the son of a schoolteacher. He attended the Volksschule and Gymnasium in Schneeberg, Saxony in the Ore Mountains from 1885 to 1898. Until 1902, he studied law, economics and political science at the universities of Berlin and Leipzig. After passing his first state law examination, he worked as a Referendar (trainee lawyer) in Dippoldiswalde, Oelsnitz, Vogtland, and Dresden from 1902 to 1906, and earned his Doctor of Law degree in Leipzig in 1904.

== Life under the German Empire and the Weimar Republic ==
After passing his second state examination in law in July 1906, he worked from August 1906 to February 1911 as a court Assessor and magistrate at the district court and regional court in Freiberg. On 1 March 1911, Bang was transferred to the Saxon Ministry of Finance. He also joined the German Conservative Party that year. In 1915, he joined the nationalistic and antisemitic Pan-German League and was placed on its executive committee in 1917. He worked his way up to Oberfinanzrat (senior financial councilor) in the finance ministry, but after the collapse of the empire in the November Revolution, he became an opponent of the newly established Weimar Republic. After refusing to take the required constitutional oath, he retired from his civil service position on 31 August 1919, waived all pension entitlements, and moved to Munich.

He now worked full-time for the Pan-German League, covering politics and economics, and published numerous books, articles and pamphlets opposing the Treaty of Versailles and the republic. He advocated that the economy must be subordinated to the national interests of the state. Bang was a member of the Deutschvölkischer Schutz- und Trutzbund, the largest and most influential antisemitic organization in Germany. He also held leading positions in other organizations, including the presidium of the Vereinigte Vaterländische Verbände Deutschlands (United Patriotic Associations of Germany), the Vorstand (executive board) of the Society of German States and the Main Association of Conservatives, as well as the supervisory board of the Deutsche Zeitung, the official newspaper of the Pan-German League. In 1920, he participated in the anti-democratic Kapp Putsch that sought to overthrow the republic and, if the coup succeeded, was to become the finance minister in the new government. However, he was acquitted in the subsequent criminal proceedings against the supporters of the attempted putsch.

Bang became a member of the conservative German National People's Party (DNVP) and belonged to its right wing, led by party chairman Alfred Hugenberg. On 20 May 1928, he was elected to the Reichstag as a DNVP deputy for electoral constituency 28 (Dresden–Bautzen), a seat he retained until November 1933. Bang was an opponent of both the Dawes Plan and the Young Plan, which set out the terms for German war reparation payments. In July 1929, he wrote a detailed four page supplement condemning the Young Plan in Der Tag, a nationalist newspaper owned by Hugenberg, which denounced "the insanity of fatally overburdening" Germany with an agreement "that cannot be fulfilled". Bang was also adamantly opposed to trade union activity of any type and advocated a new paradigm of labor-management relations called Werksgemeinschaft (working community). Bang supported Hugenberg's allying of the DNVP with the Nazi Party, the Pan-German League, Der Stahlhelm and other right-wing organizations in the Harzburg Front, formed in October 1931.

== Career in Nazi Germany ==
When the Nazis came to power in a coalition government with the DNVP on 30 January 1933, Hugenberg became Reich Minister of Economics in Adolf Hitler's first cabinet. Hugenberg brought Bang into the ministry on 4 February 1933 as State Secretary, where he functioned as Hugenberg's deputy. However, his tenure proved to be short. Bang accompanied Hugenberg to the London Economic Conference in June 1933. There, Hugenberg's comments seeking the return of Germany's colonial possessions caused an international outcry. Hitler, in the process of consolidating his power, used this as a pretext to rid himself of Hugenberg who resigned from the cabinet on 29 June. Bang was removed along with his minister, and was succeeded by the Nazi economic theorist Gottfried Feder.

Despite his dismissal, Bang continued to be elected to the Reichstag on the Nazi Party electoral list from November 1933 until the fall of the regime in May 1945, though he never formally joined the Party. With the dissolution of the DNVP at the end of June 1933, he was admitted as a "guest" of the Nazi Party faction. He also continued to hold several positions in the German business world, as chairman of the supervisory board of J. E. Reinecker AG in Chemnitz and deputy chairman of the supervisory board of Emil Zorn AG in Berlin. Bombed out of Berlin in early 1943, he moved to Hohenfichte, a hamlet in Leubsdorf near Chemnitz. He remained there through the end of the Second World War when it was occupied by the Red Army. His health rapidly deteriorated due to liver disease, and he died at Hohenfichte on 31 December 1945.

== Author ==
Bang also authored several books and articles on economic and political issues. In the spring of 1919, he published an antisemitic book Judas Schuldbuch. Eine deutsche Abrechnung (Judas Debt Book. A German Reckoning) under the pseudonym Wilhelm Meister. He postulated a historical progression from what he termed the "Jewish elections" of 1912 (the Reichstag election of 1912 when the Social Democrats became the largest party) through the "Jewish war" (First World War) to the "Jewish revolution" (the November Revolution) resulting in a "Jewish victory" and "Jewish rule" in Germany. The book went through several editions in the following two years, with more than 30,000 copies being distributed. Another article by Bang described the negative effects on the private sector of the massive use of credit for public employment programs. Never fully trusted by the Nazis, his literary work was closely monitored by the regime and, on three occasions, he narrowly escaped being charged with treason.

=== Selected writings ===
The following list is a sampling of Bang's economic and political writings.

- Judas Schuldbuch, Munich 1919
- Das Ende der deutschen Volkswirtschaft, Berlin 1921
- Volkswirtschaft und Volkstum, Langensalza 1923
- Deutsche Wirtschaftsziele, Langensalza 1926
- Die Tributversklavung, Munich 1930
- Arbeitslosigkeit und Wirtschaft, Berlin 1931
- Die Lebensfrage der Wirtschaft, Berlin 1931
- Werksgemeinschaft, Berufsstand und Ständestaat, Berlin 1931
- Geld und Währung, Munich 1932
- Weltwirtschaft, Berlin 1933
- Grundursachen der Wirtschaftsnöte, Langensalza 1936
- Aphorismen zur Wirtschaftsweisheit, Göttingen 1937
- Die farbige Gefahr, Göttingen 1938

== Sources ==
- Evans, Richard J. (2003). The Coming of the Third Reich. New York: Penguin Press. ISBN 978-0-143-03469-8.
- Information about Paul Bang in the Reichstag database
- Lohalm, Uwe (1970). Völkischer Radikalismus: Die Geschichte der Deutschvölkischer Schutz- und Trutz-Bundes, 1919–1923. Leibnitz Verlag. ISBN 978-387-4-73000-6.
- Peschel, Andreas (2014): Paul Bang in the Sächsische Biografie
- Ritthaler, Anton (1953): Paul Bang in the Deutsche Biographie
- Stockhorst, Erich (1985). 5000 Köpfe: Wer War Was im 3. Reich. Arndt. ISBN 978-3-887-41116-9.

== Additional reading ==
- Joachim Lilla, Martin Döring, Andreas Schulz: Statisten in Uniform. Die Mitglieder des Reichstags 1933–1945. Ein biographisches Handbuch. Unter Einbeziehung der völkischen und nationalsozialistischen Reichstagsabgeordneten ab Mai 1924. Droste, Düsseldorf 2004, ISBN 3-7700-5254-4, p. 19.
