= Adolf Bartels =

German writer (1862–1945)

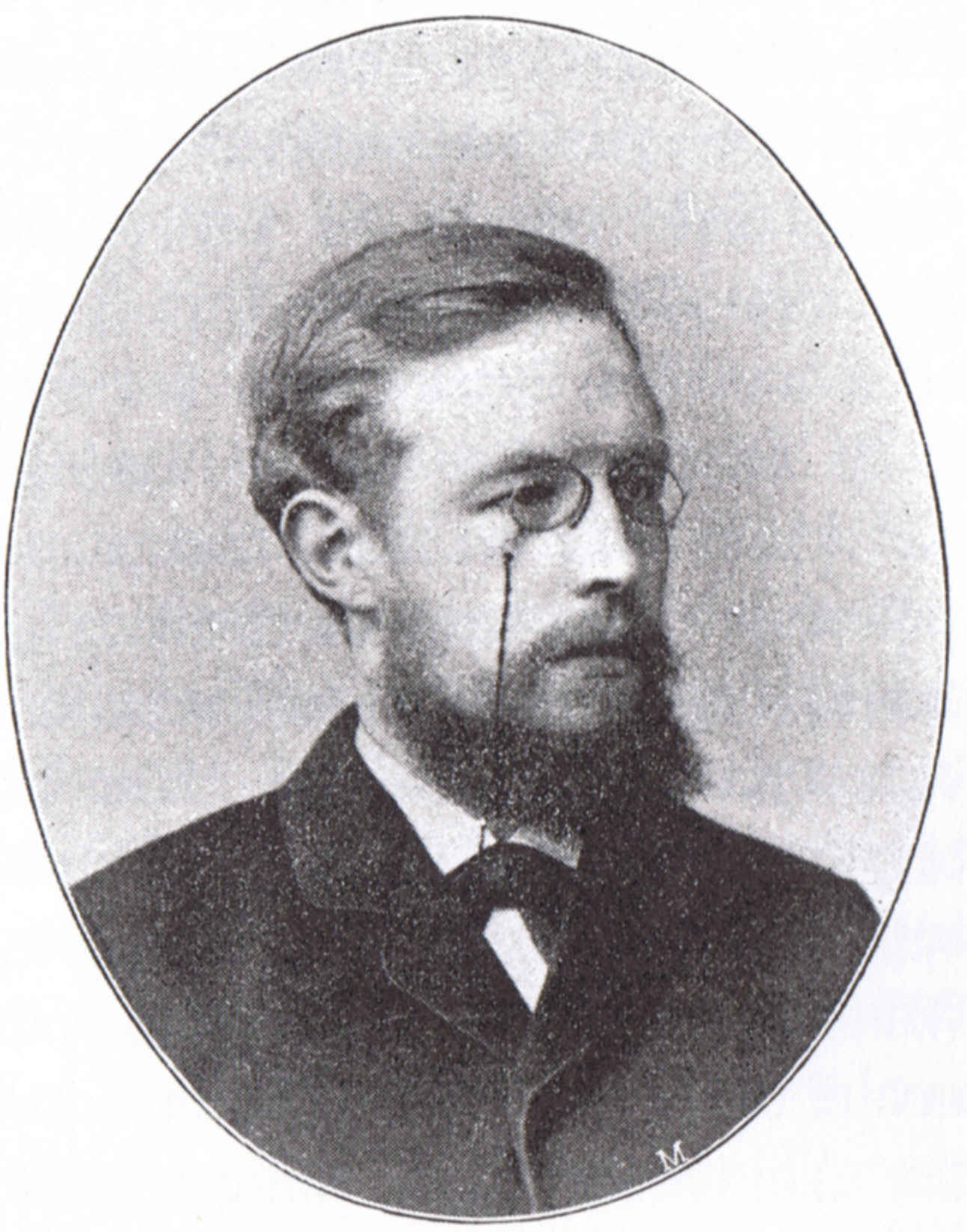
Adolf Bartels

Adolf Bartels (15 November 1862 – 7 March 1945) was a German journalist, writer and poet, known today mainly for his antisemitic and national-socialist stance.

Bartels was born at Wesselburen, in Holstein, and educated at Leipzig and Berlin. An artisan's son, Bartels studied literature. After 1895, as a free-lance journalist in Weimar, he gained a reputation as a Hebbel scholar. In 1897, he wrote a history of German literature that was marked by racist evaluations and rabid antisemitism; it became a pioneering work for National Socialist literary reviews. According to Bartels, even authors whose names sounded Jewish, who wrote for the "Jewish press", or who were friendly with Jews were "contaminated with Jewishness". The noblest task of völkisch cultural policy would therefore be a radical de-Jewing of the arts, and thus the "salvation of National Socialist Germany" (German: National-sozialistisches Deutschlands Rettung; 1924).

Bartels led a successful campaign to prevent the unveiling of a statue of Heinrich Heine in 1906. During World War I, Bartels belonged to the extreme nationalist and antisemitic Deutschvölkische Partei. After the war, when this group merged with the German National People's Party, Bartels supported it in the early years of the Weimar Republic. He also became a member of the advisory board of the Deutschvölkischer Schutz- und Trutzbund, the largest and most active antisemitic organization in Germany at that time, and was active in antisemitic propaganda on its behalf. Bartels' work experienced an upsurge in popularity, with his followers forming the Bartelsbund (Bartels Society) to promote his ideas; the Bartelsbund later merged with Erich Ludendorff's Tannenbergbund group.

After the Nazi seizure of power in 1933, Bartels' work achieved "quasi-official" status in Nazi Germany. Adolf Hitler personally awarded Bartels the Adlerschild medal, Nazi Germany's highest civilian honour, in 1937. Bartels died in Weimar on 7 March 1945.

Bartels's further literary productions included Die Dithmarscher (1898), a historical novel based on his native region advocating ruralism, which sold over 200,000 copies by the 1920s, and Martin Luther (1903).

== Works ==
=== Poetic and dramatic works ===
- Gedichte (1889)
- Dichterleben (1890)
- Aus der meerumschlungenen Heimat (1895)
- Der dumme Teufel, a mock epic (1896)
- Martin Luther, a trilogy (1903)

=== Criticism and literary history ===
- Friedrich Gessler (1892)
- Die deutsche Dichtung der Gegenwart (1897)
- Geschichte der deutschen Litteratur (two volumes, 1901-02)
- Adolf Stern (1905)
- Heinrich Heine (1906)
- Gerhart Hauptmann (1906)
- Deutsche Literatur. Einsichten und Aussichten (1907)
- Deutsches Schrifttum (1911)
