= Duroziez's disease =

Congenital variant of mitral stenosis

- Specialty: Cardiology

Duroziez's disease is a congenital variant of mitral stenosis. It was described in 1877 by Paul Louis Duroziez.
