= Lincoln sign =

- Differential diagnosis: Marfan syndrome

Lincoln sign is the medical sign consisting of excessive popliteal artery pulsation due to hemodynamic effects of aortic regurgitation. This sign is associated with Marfan syndrome, in which aortic root dilation and aortic incompetence are common features.

== History ==
The name Lincoln sign is based on a hypothetical diagnosis for a patient, namely the USA's 16th president Abraham Lincoln. In 1962, Dr Abraham M. Gordon suggested that Lincoln had Marfan's syndrome. In 1964, Dr Harold Schwartz adduced further evidence that Lincoln might have had Marfan syndrome. Later, Schwartz suggested that, based upon evidence shown in a famous photograph, Lincoln had the aortic insufficiency associated with what is now called Lincoln sign.

However, Gordon's hypothesis is highly controversial.

== See also ==
- Abraham Lincoln § Health
- Medical and mental health of Abraham Lincoln
- Aortic insufficiency § Physical examination
