= Julius Friedrich Lehmann =

German publisher and Nazi supporter (1864–1935)

Julius Friedrich Lehmann (28 November 1864 – 24 March 1935) was a German publisher of medical literature and nationalist tracts in Munich. He was the brother of the bacteriologist Karl Bernhard Lehmann.

== Biography ==
Lehmann was born on 28 November 1864, in Zürich. In Zürich he first went to the private school Beust'sche Privatschule and then to the gymnasium.

In 1900, Lehmann left Switzerland and moved to Germany, where he bought the medical journal "Münchener Medizinische Wochenschrift" (i.e. "Munich Medical Weekly Magazine"), which he soon managed to make the most widely circulated journal of its kind in Germany. Many of the articles dealt with subjects that were to shape national-socialist ideology, like compulsory sterilization.

Lehmann became a member of the Fatherland Party in 1917. He also became a member of the Thule Society. He established the Deutsche Volksverlag, which he handed over to Ernst Boepple.

Lehmann also published the journal Deutschlands Erneuerung (Germany's Renewal), which was edited by the Pan-German League. Lehmann's publishing house was an important connection between the German Nationalist Protection and Defiance Federation, the Marinebrigade Ehrhardt, then the Organisation Consul and the German National People's Party.

In 1923, Lehmann took part in the Beer Hall Putsch. He joined the Militant League for German Culture in 1928, and became a member of the NSDAP in 1931.

In 1934, at his 70th birthday, he received many honors, including the Eagle Shield of the German Reich.

He died on 24 March 1935 in Munich.

== Works ==
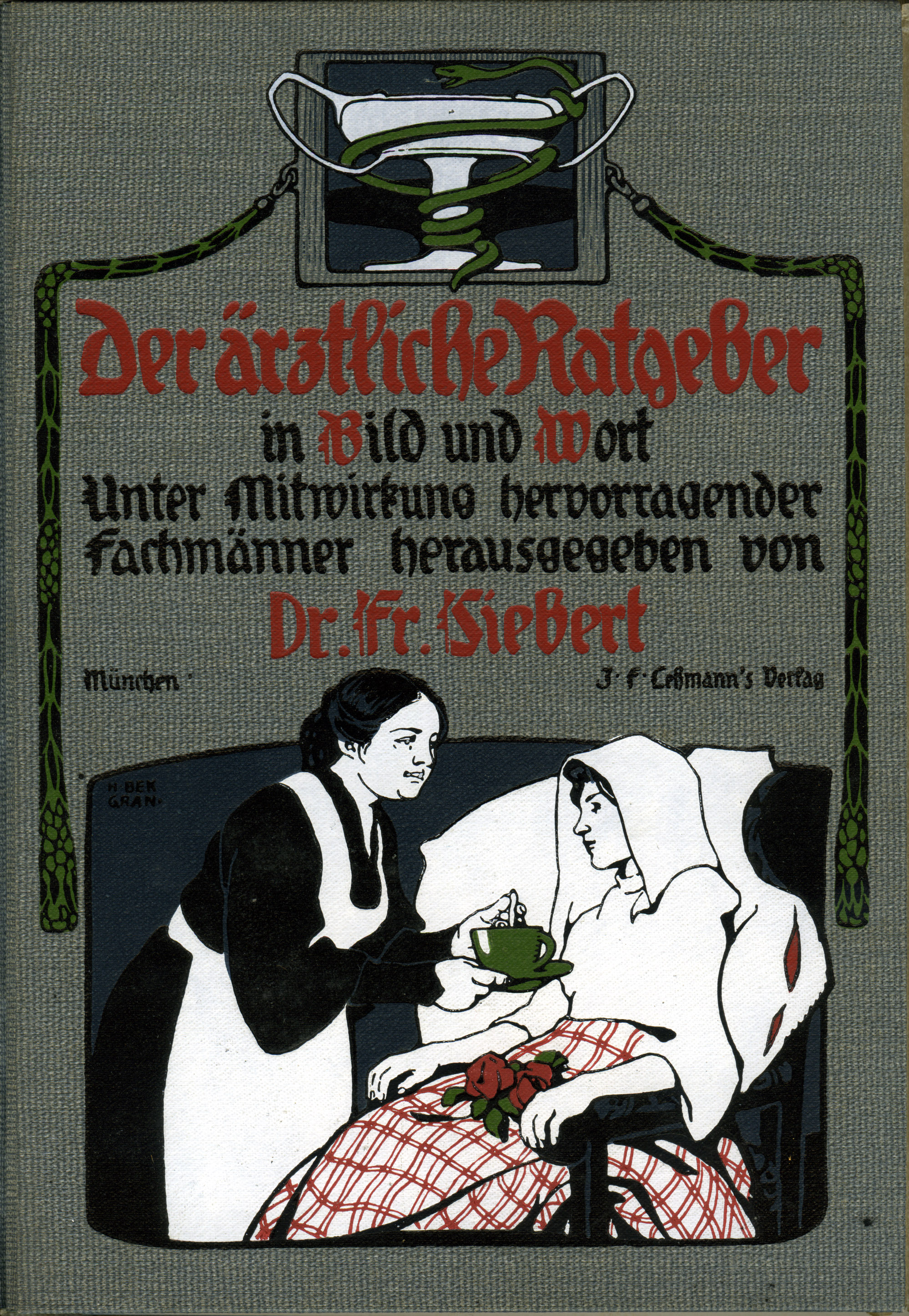
Frontcover of Der ärztliche Ratgeber in Bild und Wort. Unter Mitwirkung hervorragender Fachmänner herausgegeben von Dr. Fr. Siebert, J. F. Lehmanns Verlag, München

- Hülfsbuch bei Herstellung und Preis-Berechnung von Druckwerken, (i.e. Guide for creating printing-works and determining the price), Leop. Freund, 1890, Breslau, together with Hans Paul, 2nd extended edition
- Warum die Bücherpreise erhöht werden müssen! (Why book-prices should be higher!), Börsenverein d. Deutschen Buchhändler, 1925
- Warum wählt das nationale Deutschland im zweiten Wahlgang Adolf Hitler? (i.e. Why does the national Germany vote for Hitler at the second ballot?), J. F. Lehmanns Verl., 1932
