= Deutschvölkischer Schutz- und Trutzbund =

Nationalist and antisemitic federation in Weimar Germany

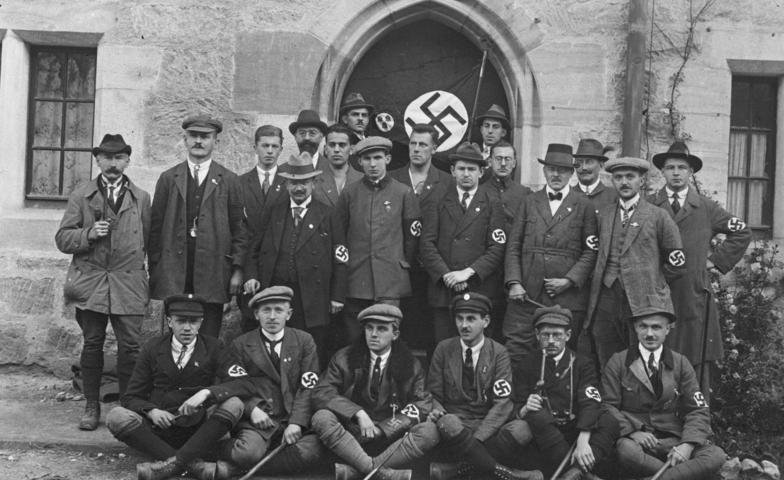
- Nazi Party attendees at the Deutschvölkischer Schutz- und Trutzbund's "German Day" at Coburg in October 1922
- Leader: Alfred Roth
- Founded: 1919; 107 years ago
- Dissolved: 1924; 102 years ago
- Headquarters: Duisburg; Hamburg
- Ideology: Antisemitism; Völkisch nationalism Authoritarianism
- Political position: Far-right
- Status: Banned
- Size: approx. 500,000 (1922 est.)

The Deutschvölkischer Schutz- und Trutzbund (English: German Nationalist Protection and Defiance Federation) was the largest and the most active antisemitic federation in Germany after the First World War. It formed a significant part of the Völkisch movement during the Weimar Republic (1918–1933), whose democratic parliamentary system it unilaterally rejected. Its publishing arm issued books that greatly influenced the opinions of Nazi Party leaders such as Heinrich Himmler. The organisation was banned in 1922 following the enactment of the Law for the Protection of the Republic and it faded away, with many of its members eventually joining the Nazi Party.

== Origin and organisation ==
The Deutschvölkischer Schutz- und Trutzbund was originally called the Deutscher Schutz- und Trutzbund when it was founded by members of the Pan-German League (Alldeutscher Verband) in February 1919 at a meeting in Bamberg for the purpose of "fighting" Judaism. Alfred Roth became its public chairman, with Konstantin von Gebsattel, appointed on 1 October 1919 by Ernst von Hertzberg Lottin, acting as its secret (geheime) or underground leader. Its advisory board included Ernst Anton Franz von Bodelschwingh, Theodor Fritsch, August Gebhard, Paul Lucius, Julius Friedrich Lehmann, Georg von Stössel and Ferdinand Werner. Its meeting place was originally in Duisburg, in Alfred Roth's house, but was later moved to Hamburg, where it joined several other similar organizations. It merged with the Reichshammerbund and about a month later with the Deutschvölkischer Bund, the organization that had succeeded the Deutschvölkische Partei.

The federation underwent a rapid growth in membership and, by the summer of 1922, it likely had between 150,000 and 180,000 members. It had a presence in every German state with over 600 local chapters organised into 20 Gaue (regions) in Germany, Austria and Danzig.

== Manifesto ==
The organisation's manifesto was Wenn ich der Kaiser wär ("If I Were the Kaiser"), which was written by Pan-German League president Heinrich Claß, in which he expressed identitarian and nationalist views. His slogan was "Germany for the Germans". Julius Friedrich Lehmann, a Munich publisher, helped promote the organisation's ideas, and in October 1918, Claß called for a coup d'etat. The organisation agitated against the Weimar Republic.

== Symbols ==
The organisation used as its symbols a blue cornflower and a swastika. According to the British author Peter Padfield its motto was "Wir sind die Herren der Welt!" ("We are the masters of the world!"). However, not a single German source can be found that confirms the motto, which in fact is a verse from the song "Der mächtigste König im Luftrevier" ("The mightiest king in the skies"). According to the German historian Ulrich Sieg, the organization's motto was Deutschland den Deutschen ("Germany for the Germans").

== Excerpt of constitution ==
Here is an excerpt from its constitution:

The Bund fights for the moral rebirth of the German people.... It considers the pernicious and destructive influence of Jewry to be the main cause of the defeat and the removal of this influence to be necessary for the political and economic recovery of Germany, and for the salvation of German culture.

== Decline and dissolution ==
Following the assassination of Foreign Minister Walther Rathenau in June 1922, the federation, some of whose members were implicated in the murder, was banned in most federal states of the republic, following the enactment of Law for the Protection of the Republic of 23 July 1922. Appeals of the bans were rejected, the federation never recovered its former strength and dissolved in 1924, with a significant number of members defecting to the Nazi Party and other antisemitic and Völkisch groups.

== Notable members ==
- Herbert Albrecht
- Karl Astel
- Erich von dem Bach-Zelewski
- Paul Bang
- Werner Best
- Arthur Böckenhauer
- Ernst Boepple
- Philipp Bouhler
- Karl Brück
- Walter Buch
- Rudolf Buttmann
- Leonardo Conti
- Heinrich Deubel
- Artur Dinter
- Oskar Dirlewanger
- Dietrich Eckart
- Hermann Willibald Fischer
- Friedrich Karl Florian
- Hermann Fobke
- Axel von Freytagh-Loringhoven
- Theodor Fritsch
- Wilhelm Grimm
- Josef Grohé
- Wilhelm Gustloff
- Leopold Gutterer
- Heinrich Haake
- Ludolf Haase
- Wilhelm Helfer
- Otto Hellmuth
- Hans Helwig
- Reinhard Heydrich
- Reinhard Höhn
- Karl Kaufmann
- Kurt Kaul
- Walter Köhler
- Georg Joel
- Manfred von Killinger
- Josef Klant
- Richard Kunze
- J. F. Lehmann
- Ernst Ludwig Leyser
- Hinrich Lohse
- Viktor Lutze
- Walter Maass
- Wilhelm Meinberg
- Eugen Munder
- Wilhelm Murr
- Martin Mutschmann
- Theodor Oberlander
- Wilhelm Ohnesorge
- Otto Rasch
- Friedrich Ringshausen
- Alfred Roth
- Bernhard Rust
- Fritz Sauckel
- Wilhelm Schepmann
- Franz Xaver Schwarz
- Franz Schwede
- Wolfram Sievers
- Jakob Sporrenberg
- Gustav Staebe
- Franz Walter Stahlecker
- Julius Streicher
- Ernst Werner Techow
- Otto Telschow
- Fritz Tittmann
- Martha Voß-Zietz
- Felix Wankel
- Karl Weinrich
- Ferdinand Werner

== See also ==
- Conservative Revolution
- Freikorps
- Organisation Consul
