= Otto Heinrich Enoch Becker =

German ophthalmologist (1828–1890)

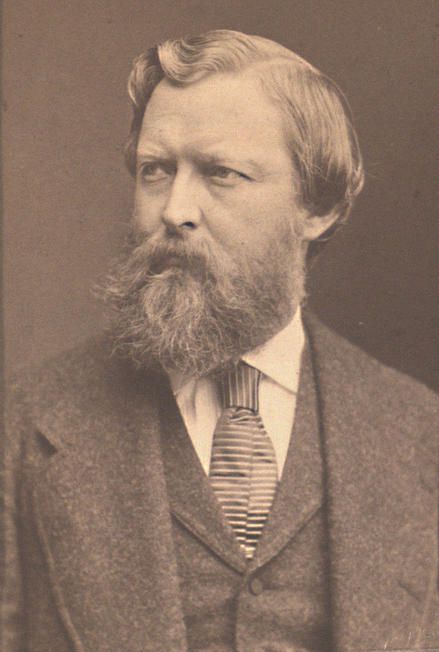
- Born: Otto Heinrich Enoch Becker; 3 May 1828; Ratzeburg, Duchy of Lauenburg
- Died: 7 February 1890 (aged 61); Heidelberg, German Empire
- Scientific career
- Fields: Ophthalmology

Otto Heinrich Enoch Becker (3 May 1828 – 7 February 1890) was a German ophthalmologist born near Ratzeburg in the Duchy of Holstein.

== Education and career ==
In 1859 he earned his medical doctorate from the University of Vienna, where he studied under Carl Ferdinand von Arlt (1812-1887). Beginning in 1867 he was a professor of ophthalmology at the University of Heidelberg.

Becker was a pioneer in ophthalmic pathology, and the author of numerous writings on the eye. His many publications include treatises on the vessels of the macula lutea, congenital total color blindness, strictures of the lacrimal canaliculi and manifestations involving the movement of blood in the retina. He also completed Arlt's autobiography, "Meine Erlebnisse", following the death of his former teacher, and in 1866, published a German edition of Franciscus Cornelis Donders' work "On the Anomalies of Accommodation and Refraction of the Eye" (London, 1864) as "Die Anomalien der Accommodation und Refraktion des Auges". In addition, he published a large number of anatomist Heinrich Müller's medical papers in a collection titled "Heinrich Müller's gesammelte und hinterlassene Schriften zur Anatomie und Physiologie des Auges" (Heinrich Müller's collected and bequeathed writings on the anatomy and physiology of the eye).

José Rizal (1861-1896), martyr and national hero of the Philippines, completed his ophthalmological studies under Professor Becker at the University Eye Clinic Heidelberg in 1886.

Herman Bendell (1843-1932), American Civil War surgeon, Superintendent of Indian Affairs Arizona Territory, and American Consul in Elsinore, Denmark, studied for a year with Professor Becker at the University of Heidelberg in the 1870s.

In 1887 Becker established the "Graefe Museum" at the University of Heidelberg in honor of oculist Albrecht von Graefe (1828-1870). In 1879 he introduced the concept "cataracta complicata" to describe lenticular changes that often appear in various ocular diseases — these are generally characterized by punctate, striate or diffuse opacities often accompanied with a polychromatic luster.

== Associated eponyms ==
- "Becker's phenomenon": Pulsation of the retinal arteries in Graves' disease.
- "Becker's test": A test for astigmatism that uses diagrams of sets of three lines radiating in different meridians.
