= Annuloaortic ectasia =

- Other names: Cystic medial necrosis of aorta
- Segments of the aorta, including the thoracic aorta, ascending aorta, aortic arch, descending thoracic aorta, abdominal aorta, suprarenal abdominal aorta, and infrarenal abdominal aorta.
- Specialty: Cardiology

Annuloaortic ectasia is characterized by pure aortic valve regurgitation and aneurysmal dilatation of the ascending aorta. Men are more likely than women to develop idiopathic annuloaortic ectasia, which usually manifests in the fourth or sixth decades of life. Additional factors that contribute to this condition include osteogenesis imperfecta, inflammatory aortic diseases, intrinsic valve disease, Loeys-Dietz syndrome, Marfan syndrome, and operated congenital heart disease.

On a gross level, there is a pear-shaped, symmetric enlargement due to proximal aortic dilation. The aortic wall dilatation at the commissural level causes the cusps to effectively shorten and prevent them from converging during systole, which results in aortic valve incompetence. The arch is typically spared from the aneurysmal process, though it may involve the entire ascending aorta. The ectatic aorta may experience dissections. Dissections of the ascending aorta are typically tiny, confined, and restricted. Aortic rupture can happen even if there is no dissection.

The term was coined by the American heart surgeon Denton Cooley in 1961.

== Signs and symptoms ==
Symptoms are often neurological or circulatory. Symptoms include dyspnea, respiratory distress, heart failure, atrial tachycardia, pain, cardiac tamponade, palpitations, and malaise. Aortic valve regurgitation is found in about 77% of all patients.

== Treatment ==
For many years, the gold standard treatment for patients with aortic valve disease and aortic root aneurysms was to replace both the aortic valve and the ascending aorta with a composite graft. This also applies to patients with different levels of AI and annuloaortic ectasia, where the aortic valve may be largely preserved without any structural abnormalities.

== See also ==
- Aortic regurgitation
- Aortic valve replacement
