= Ernst Brandes (politician) =

German lawyer, landowner and agricultural administrator

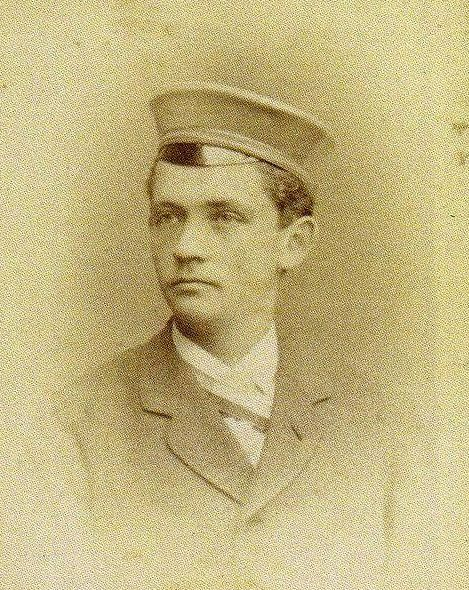
- Ernst Brandes as an active member of the Corps Lusatia Leipzig

President German Agricultural Council & Prussian Main Chamber of Agriculture
- In office 1922 – 15 July 1933
- Succeeded by: Karl Kräutle

President East Prussian Chamber of Agriculture
- In office 5 January 1914 – 15 July 1933
- Preceded by: Adolf Tortilowicz von Batocki-Friebe

Additional positions
- 1900–1933: Member of the East Prussian Landtag
- 1933–1935: Member of the Prussian State Council

Personal details
- Born: 11 March 1862 Dresden, Kingdom of Saxony, German Empire
- Died: 4 April 1935 (age 73) Insterburg, Province of East Prussia, Free State of Prussia, Nazi Germany
- Party: German National People's Party
- Education: University of Leipzig; Martin Luther University of Halle-Wittenberg; University of Göttingen
- Profession: Lawyer; Estate Manager
- Awards: Adlerschild des Deutschen Reiches

Military service
- Allegiance: German Empire
- Branch/service: Royal Prussian Army
- Years of service: 1886–1887
- Rank: Leutnant der reserves
- Unit: 7th (1st Rhenish) Hussars Regiment "King Wilhelm I"

Ernst Brandes (11 March 1862 – 4 April 1935) was a German lawyer, estate manager and politician. During the Weimar Republic he was an influential agricultural administrator at the state and national levels. After the Nazi Party came to power, he was removed from his administrative positions.

== Early life and education ==
Brandes was born in Dresden, the son of an estate owner at Gut Althof near Insterburg (today, Chernyakhovsk) in East Prussia. He attended the Gymnasium in Insterburg, veterinary school in Hanover and then studied law at the University of Leipzig and the Martin Luther University Halle-Wittenberg. He became a member of the student corps Lusatia Leipzig in 1883 and participated in academic fencing on twelve occasions. In 1886 he received his Doctor of Laws degree from the University of Göttingen. He fulfilled his military service as a one-year volunteer in the Royal Prussian Army with the 7th (1st Rhenish) Hussars Regiment "King Wilhelm I" headquartered in Bonn, and served as an officer in the reserves. After passing the Referendar state examination, he worked as an apprentice lawyer in Gumbinnen and Königsberg and at the Regierungsbezirke (governmental districts) of Trier, Saarbrücken and Hildesheim. After passing the Assessor state examination, he was appointed a government lawyer in 1893. From 1894, Brandes managed his father's estate, became known as an excellent livestock breeder and became active in political affairs as a leader of East Prussian conservatives.

== Political career ==
Brandes was elected to the Insterburg Kreistag (district council) in 1894 and to the East Prussian Provincial Landtag in 1900. In 1902 he became a member of the provincial Chamber of Agriculture, becoming its president in 1914 and retaining control until 1933. After the invasion of Russian troops at the beginning of the First World War in August 1914, he remained on his estate and, after the invaders were expelled, worked throughout the war years to restore agriculture and to organize the war food industry.

When the Weimar Republic was formed in 1919, Brandes was elected to the East Prussian Landtag as a German National People's Party deputy, serving until its abolition in October 1933. He continued to lead the East Prussian Chamber of Agriculture during the Weimar years through the hyperinflation crisis of 1922–1923 and the agricultural crisis of the late 1920s. In November 1923, Brandes became the representative of German agriculture to the board of directors of the newly established Deutsche Rentenbank. He became known beyond East Prussia as an advocate of the conservative policy of favoring higher agricultural tariffs espoused by the Grüne Front (Green Front) formed in 1929. Between 1922 and 1933 his influence extended to the state and national levels when he advanced to the presidency of both the Prussian Main Chamber of Agriculture and the German Agricultural Council.

Brandes was awarded honorary doctorates by the University of Königsberg (1919) and the University of Hohenheim (1932), which at the time was primarily an agricultural college. From 1928 to 1933, he sat in the Senate of the Kaiser Wilhelm Society and he was appointed to the Provisional Reich Economic Council in 1931. To mark his 70th birthday, the Reich government held a ceremony in Königsberg, where Reich President Paul von Hindenburg awarded him the Adlerschild des Deutschen Reiches, the highest civilian award of the Weimar Republic. Following the Nazi seizure of power, Brandes was removed from his leadership of the Prussian and German agricultural bodies in July 1933. However, Prussian Minister president Hermann Göring on 11 July appointed him to the recently reconstituted Prussian State Council, where he would serve in a purely advisory capacity until his death on 4 April 1935 at his family estate in East Prussia.

== Sources ==
- Ernst Brandes entry in the Deutsche Biographie
- Lilla, Joachim (2005). Der Preußische Staatsrat 1921–1933: Ein biographisches Handbuch. Düsseldorf: Droste Verlag. ISBN 978-3-770-05271-4.
- Zentner, Christian; Bedürftig, Friedemann, eds. (1997) [1991]. The Encyclopedia of the Third Reich. New York: Da Capo Press. ISBN 978-0-306-80793-0.
