= Harry Plate =

German tinsmith (1853–1939)

Harry Plate (18 October 1853, in Hanover – 29 April 1939, in Hanover) was a German tinsmith and long time member of the Hanover chamber of artisans.

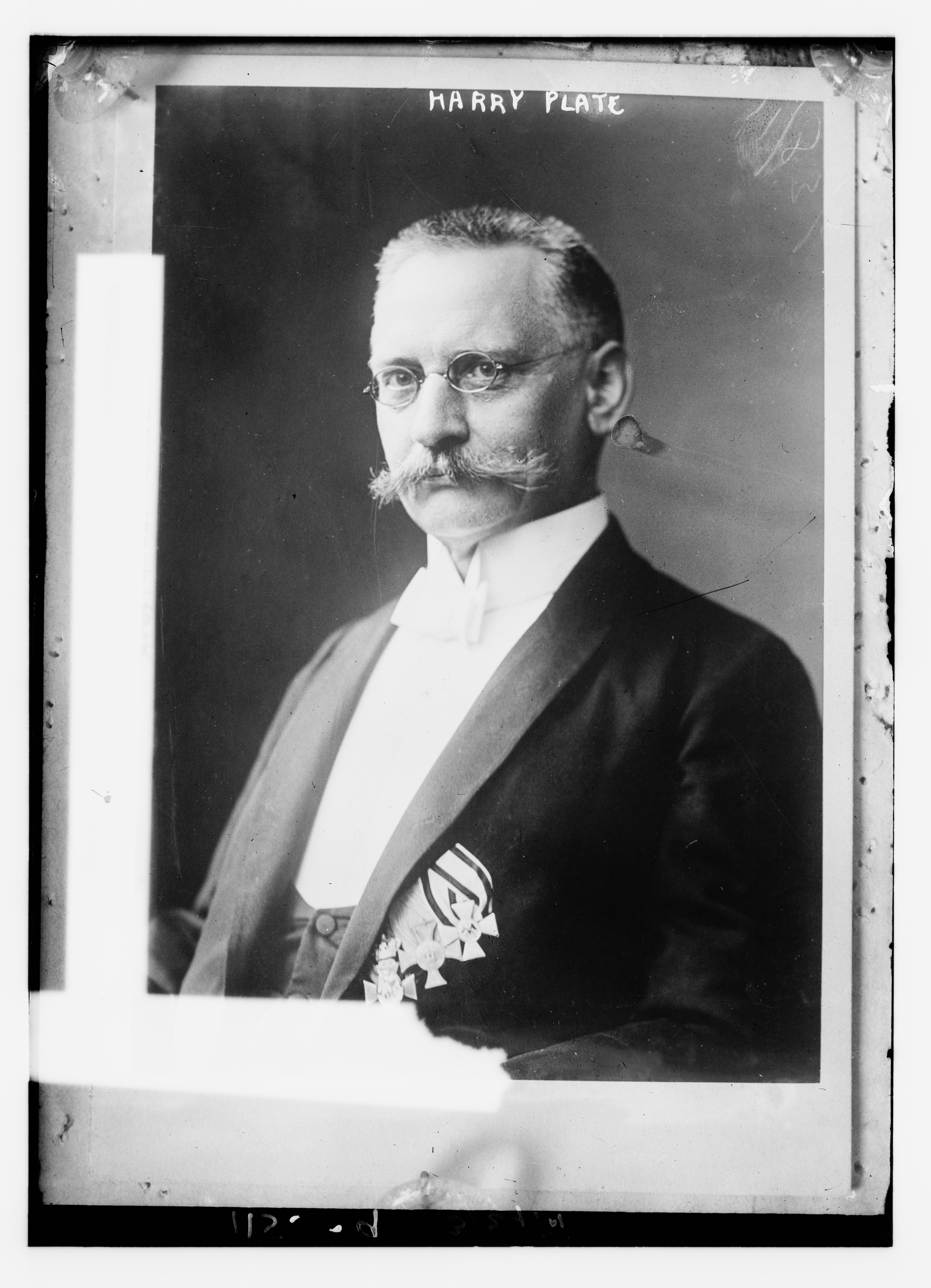

Harry Plate was a master tinsmith and member of the Hanover chamber of artisans and president of the German Artisans and Commerce Day at its foundation in 1900. On 15 December 1910 the Prussian ministry of state deliberated on representation in the Prussian House of Lords. It concluded that artisans should be represented in future, but not workers, since the unions of the latter group were mostly subversive. By a decree of the Prussian minister for Industry and Commerce on 4 January 1911, Harry Plate was made a member of the Prussian House of Lords, a position which he held until 1918. In 1911 he became a board member of the Reichsdeutscher Mittelstandsverband and in 1912 he became a board member of the Deutscher Wehrverein. From 1919 to 1924 he was member of the Vorläufiger Reichswirtschaftsrat.

In 1925, on the 25th German Artisans Day, Harry Plate was awarded the highest honour of the German Reich, the Adlerschild des Deutschen Reiches, but in the form of a plaque without a stand. Harry Plate was the only individual to be honoured with this lesser form of the award.

== Bibliography ==
- Acta Borussica Vol. 10 (1909–1918) (PDF-Datei; 2,74 MB), p. 423 (439/510)
- Waldemar R. Röhrbein, "Plate, Harry," in: Hannoversches Biographisches Lexikon / Von den Anfängen bis zur Gegenwart, Hannover: Schlüter, 2002, ISBN 3-87706-706-9, p. 285, online on Google Books.
