= Friedrich von Müller =

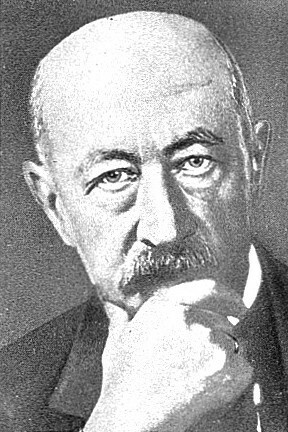
Friedrich von Müller

Friedrich von Müller (17 September 1858, Augsburg – 18 November 1941, Munich) was a German physician remembered for describing Müller's sign, and leptospirosis. He was the son of the head of the medical department in the hospital in Augsburg. He studied natural sciences and then medicine under Carl von Voit. He was awarded his doctorate in Munich in 1882, and became assistant to Carl Jakob Adolf Christian Gerhardt in Würzburg and later Berlin. He was habilitated in internal medicine in 1888 and became professor of clinical propaedeutics and laryngology in Bonn. He moved to Breslau in 1890, Marburg in 1892, and Basel in 1899, before returning to Munich in 1902. His approach to clinical teaching and how to improve medical education were widely recognised and influenced medical education in the UK and US.

He became a knight in 1907, Hofrat in 1911, and Geheimrat in 1913 of the Kingdom of Bavaria. In 1922, he became a member of the German Academy of Sciences Leopoldina (Deutsche Akademie der Naturforscher Leopoldina). From 1927 to 1934, he was president of the Deutsche Akademie, a German cultural institute. In 1927, the city of Munich made him to an honorary citizen. In 1933, he got the Adlerschild des Deutschen Reiches (Eagle Shield of the German Empire) with the dedication "DEM GROSSEN KLINIKER" (the great clinician).
