= Paul Louis Duroziez =

French physician

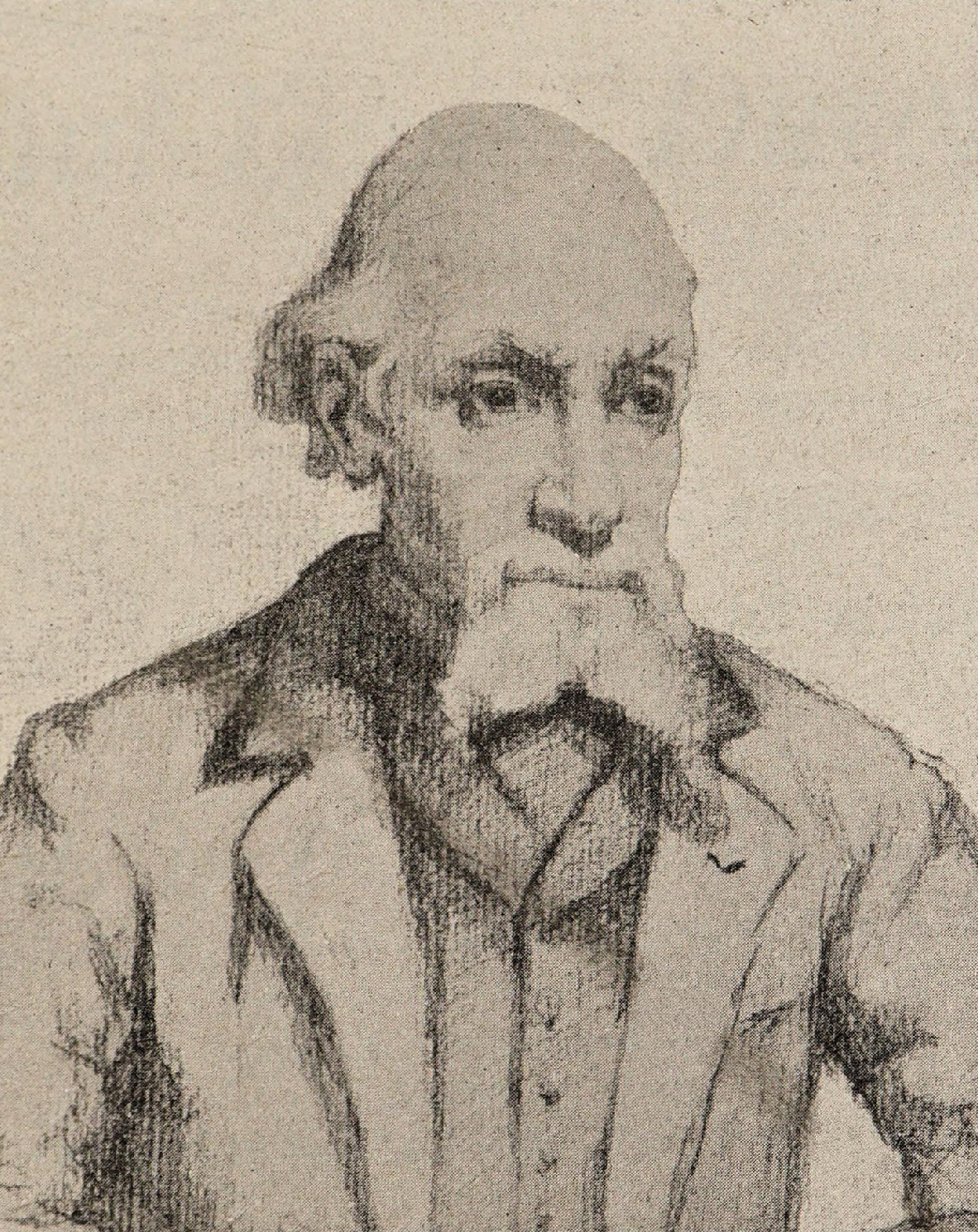
Paul Louis Duroziez

Paul Louis Duroziez (8 January 1826, Paris – 16 January 1897, Paris) was a French physician remembered for describing Duroziez's sign and Duroziez's disease. He studied medicine in Paris, graduating in 1853. He worked with Jean-Martin Charcot and later as a surgeon in the Franco-Prussian War in 1870. He worked as a general practitioner rather than in hospital, but was highly regarded by physicians for his publications on heart disease. He was elected president of the Société de Médecine in 1882 and became a Chevalier of the Légion d'honneur in 1895.
