= Josef Klant =

German Nazi Party official (1869–1927)

Gauleiter of Gau Hamburg
- In office 27 March 1925 – 4 November 1926
- Appointed by: Adolf Hitler
- Preceded by: Position created
- Succeeded by: Albert Krebs (as Ortsgruppenleiter)

Personal details
- Born: 8 December 1869 Herzogenwalde, Province of Silesia, Kingdom of Prussia, North German Confederation
- Died: 7 September 1927 (aged 57) Hamburg, Weimar Republic
- Cause of death: Stroke
- Resting place: Ohlsdorf Cemetery, Hamburg, Germany
- Party: Nazi Party
- Other political affiliations: German Socialist Party; German National People's Party; German Völkisch Freedom Party
- Occupation: Miner; Clerk; Shopkeeper

Josef Klant (8 December 1869 – 7 September 1927) was an early member of the Nazi Party, served in the Hamburg Parliament and was the first Gauleiter of Hamburg. Following his inability to quell internal conflicts in his jurisdiction, he was removed as Gauleiter after only 17 months in office and died less than a year later.

== Early life ==
Klant was born in Herzogenwalde in the Prussian Province of Silesia (today, Żubrów in Poland). After attending Volksschule, Klant worked in the mining industry from 1883 to 1886. Then he moved to Hamburg and became a clerk at Blohm+Voss, a shipbuilding company. In 1899, now a travel agent for his employer, he was granted Hamburg citizenship. In 1903, he bought a cigar business which he ran until his death. Drawn to right-wing and conservative political views, during the Weimar Republic he became a member of the German Socialist Party and, later, the German National People's Party. He was also a member of the Deutschvölkischer Schutz- und Trutzbund, the most active and most influential antisemitic federation at that time.

In July 1922, Klant joined the Nazi Party and became chairman of its local association. When the Party was banned in the wake of the Beer Hall Putsch, he remained a tireless organizer and founded several front organizations which were quickly banned as well. In 1923 and 1924, he remained active as a speaker at several mass meetings. The Hamburg association was last reorganized under the name the Blücher Group and, in February 1924, Klant was sentenced to 4 months in prison and a 500 Reichsmark fine for his continued illegal activities on its behalf. In October 1924, he was elected to the Hamburg state parliament under the auspices of the German Völkisch Freedom Party. He would remain a member of this body until his death.

== Nazi Party career ==
In March 1925, Klant re-joined the Nazi Party (membership number 1,065) after the ban on it was lifted, and he founded the Nazi Ortsgruppe (local group) in Hamburg, Germany’s second largest city. On 27 March, he was proclaimed the first Gauleiter of Gau Hamburg and was confirmed in this post by Adolf Hitler on 15 July. He maintained his headquarters in the backrooms of his cigar shop. Klant's Gau was a member of the National Socialist Working Association, a short-lived group of north and northwest German Gaue, organized and led by Gregor Strasser, which unsuccessfully sought to amend the Party program. The association was dissolved in 1926 following the Bamberg Conference.

Klant was considered to be in the moderate wing of the Party and opposed the use of force as a tactic against political opponents. He did not succeed in asserting himself against the more militant local Sturmabteilung (SA), the Nazi paramilitary group. Constant quarrels between the Hamburg SA and the Gau political leadership were the result. In addition, the Party membership remained largely lower middle class and failed to attract sizeable numbers of the working class. The membership stagnated and the leadership was factionalized. Klant was increasingly unable to control his subordinates.

In October 1926, Klant offered to resign, hoping that this would be refused thereby strengthening his position in the leadership. Instead, the Party headquarters in Munich sent Strasser, now the national propaganda leader, to Hamburg to supervise a total restructuring. On 4 November 1926, Strasser removed Klant as Gauleiter. In addition, Hamburg lost its status as a Gau and was renamed the "Independent Ortsgruppe Hamburg". Strasser oversaw the election of Albert Krebs with the title of chairman (in effect, Ortsgruppenleiter) of the new organization. Klant protested his removal by appealing to his fellow Gauleiter, but relinquished his challenge when it became clear that Strasser had the full support of Hitler. Klant took no additional active part in Party affairs, and died on 7 September 1927 after suffering a stroke. At his funeral in Ohlsdorf Cemetery, Krebs spoke on behalf of the Party.

== Sources ==
- Höffkes, Karl (1986). Hitlers Politische Generale. Die Gauleiter des Dritten Reiches: ein biographisches Nachschlagewerk (in German). Tübingen: Grabert-Verlag. ISBN 3-87847-163-7.
- Miller, Michael D.; Schulz, Andreas (2017). Gauleiter: The Regional Leaders of the Nazi Party and Their Deputies, 1925-1945. Vol. 2 (Georg Joel - Dr. Bernhard Rust). R. James Bender Publishing. ISBN 978-1-932970-32-6.
- Noakes, Jeremy; Pridham, Goeffrey, eds. (1983). Nazism 1919-1945, Volume 1: The Rise to Power 1919-1934 (1998 ed.). University of Exeter Press. ISBN 0-85989 598 X.
- Orlow, Dietrich (1969). The History of the Nazi Party: 1919-1933. University of Pittsburgh Press. ISBN 0-8229-3183-4.

== Additional reading ==
- Hans-Jürgen Döscher (2008): Kampf gegen das Judenthum. Gustav Stille 1845–1920. Antisemit im Deutschen Kaiserreich. Berlin: Metropol, ISBN 978-3-938690-90-1.
