= Duroziez's sign =

- Other names: Alvarenga-Duroziez sign
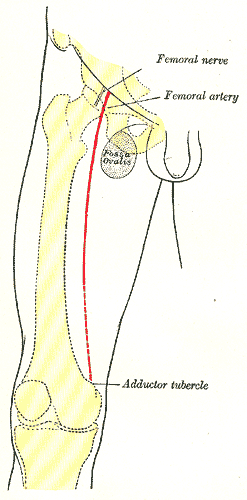
- Femoral artery
- Differential diagnosis: Aortic insufficiency

Duroziez's sign is a sign of aortic insufficiency. It consists of an audible systolic-diastolic murmur which can be heard over the femoral artery when it is compressed with the bell of a stethoscope.

It is named for French physician Paul Louis Duroziez who published its description in 1861, even though it was first described by Portuguese physician Pedro Francisco da Costa Alvarenga in 1855; for this reason it is alternatively known as the Alvarenga-Duroziez sign.
