= Albert Krebs =

German politician (1899–1974)

Chairman of Independent Ortsgruppe Hamburg
- In office 2 November 1926 – 26 February 1928
- Appointed by: Adolf Hitler
- Preceded by: Josef Klant (as Gauleiter)
- Succeeded by: Position abolished

Gauleiter of Gau Hamburg
- In office 26 February 1928 – 3 September 1928
- Appointed by: Adolf Hitler
- Preceded by: Position re-created
- Succeeded by: Hinrich Lohse (acting)

Personal details
- Born: 3 March 1899 Amorbach, German Empire
- Died: 26 June 1974 (aged 75) Hamburg, West Germany
- Party: Nazi party
- Education: Germanistics, history, national economics, and English language
- Occupation: Teacher; Journalist

Military service
- Allegiance: German Empire
- Branch/service: Imperial German Army
- Years of service: 1917–1919

Albert Krebs (3 March 1899 in Amorbach – 26 June 1974 in Hamburg) was the Nazi Gauleiter in Hamburg in the time of the Third Reich.

Krebs, a higher archive official's son, did his Abitur in 1917 after finishing school at the Gymnasium in Aschaffenburg and thereafter reported to the military as a volunteer. He was not deployed in the First World War.

Krebs was discharged in March 1919, leaving him free to begin studies in Germanistics, history, national economics, and English language in Würzburg, Tübingen, Marburg and Frankfurt am Main. Krebs had been busying himself in the youth movement even before the war. Furthermore, during his studies, he was in the Gildenschaft (a Studentenverbindung umbrella group) and in the Freikorps von Epp and Oberland in 1919. In 1922, he received his doctorate and, in the same year, he joined the Nazi party. In March 1925, Krebs was working at the Deutschnationaler Handlungsgehilfen-Verband (German National Trade Assistants' Federation; DHV) in Spandau in Berlin.

After the reestablishment of the NSDAP, Krebs rejoined it on 10 May 1926 (Membership No. 35,589). On the resignation of Hamburg Gauleiter Josef Klant on 4 November 1926, Hamburg was downgraded from the status of a Nazi Gau. Krebs then was appointed chairman (in effect, Ortsgruppenleiter) of the new "Independent Ortsgruppe Hamburg". After the Local Group was once again raised to Gau status on 26 February 1928, Krebs became Gauleiter of Gau Hamburg. After some infighting, in which Krebs did not feel he was being supported enough by the party leadership in Munich, he stepped down as Gauleiter on 3 September 1928.

From 1929 to January 1931, Krebs was editor of the weekly Hamburger Volksblatt, the first Nazi newspaper in the city. In April 1930, Krebs took over the leadership of the Hamburg Betriebszellenorganisation, the Nazi Factory Cell Organization. A further career advance made it possible for him, starting in January 1931, to work as the first editor-in-chief of the Nazi daily newspaper Hamburger Tageblatt. As a member of the left wing of the Party, he was not comfortable with the Party leadership's move to accommodate more conservative and business interests. Owing to an article published early in 1932 that was critical of Chancellor Kurt von Schleicher's cabinet, Krebs was upbraided by Adolf Hitler personally, removed as editor and expelled from the Party on 20 May 1932.

Professionally, he continued his activities as a national education and cultural consultant at the DHV until its dissolution in April 1934. Thereafter he worked as a freelancer at the German Office Workers' Union (Deutsche Angestellten-Gewerkschaft; DAG). From September 1934 to March 1938 he was the director of the Hamburg Public Library. His last position was as Senate Director of the Hamburg Cultural Administration from April 1940 to July 1945.

With the beginning of the Russian Campaign, Krebs was called up for service and assigned as special leader of the Propagandabteilung Ostland and took over cultural affairs in the cities of Riga and Tallinn. Through his acquaintance with Fritz-Dietlof von der Schulenburg, to whom he had been introduced in 1942, Krebs knew in advance about the resistance's plans to overthrow the Führer and also about the attempt on Hitler's life. After it failed on 20 July 1944, he had to go underground. After the end of World War II, in Denazification proceedings, Krebs was banned from working as a journalist and lost his pension rights. On appeal, however, that ban was overturned in proceedings in October 1949.

In his autobiographical chronicle, published in 1959, "Tendenzen und Gestalten der NSDAP" ("The NSDAP's Tendencies and Shapes"), Krebs portrayed himself as a contemporary who was at first impressed by Nazism's political ideas and goals, but who after personal experience with Hitler's dictatorial leadership style and the "incompetence in the NS Führer State" withdrew, disappointed, from political life.

== Sources ==
- The infancy of Nazism. Memoirs of Ex-Gauleiter Albert Krebs 1923–1933. Hrsg. und Übers. William Sheridan Allen. Franklin Watts, New Viewpoints, NY 1976, ISBN 0-531-05376-8.
- Albert Krebs in deutsche-biographie
- Miller, Michael D.; Schulz, Andreas (2017). Gauleiter: The Regional Leaders of the Nazi Party and Their Deputies, 1925-1945. Vol. II (Georg Joel - Dr. Bernhard Rust). R. James Bender Publishing. ISBN 978-1-932970-32-6.
