= Mayne's sign =

- Differential diagnosis: aortic regurgitation

Mayne's sign is a clinical sign that indicates that there is a drop of at least 15 mmHg (2.0 kPa) in the diastolic blood pressure on raising the arm. It occurs in patients with aortic regurgitation though shouldn't be considered a reliable finding.
