= Ernst Poensgen =

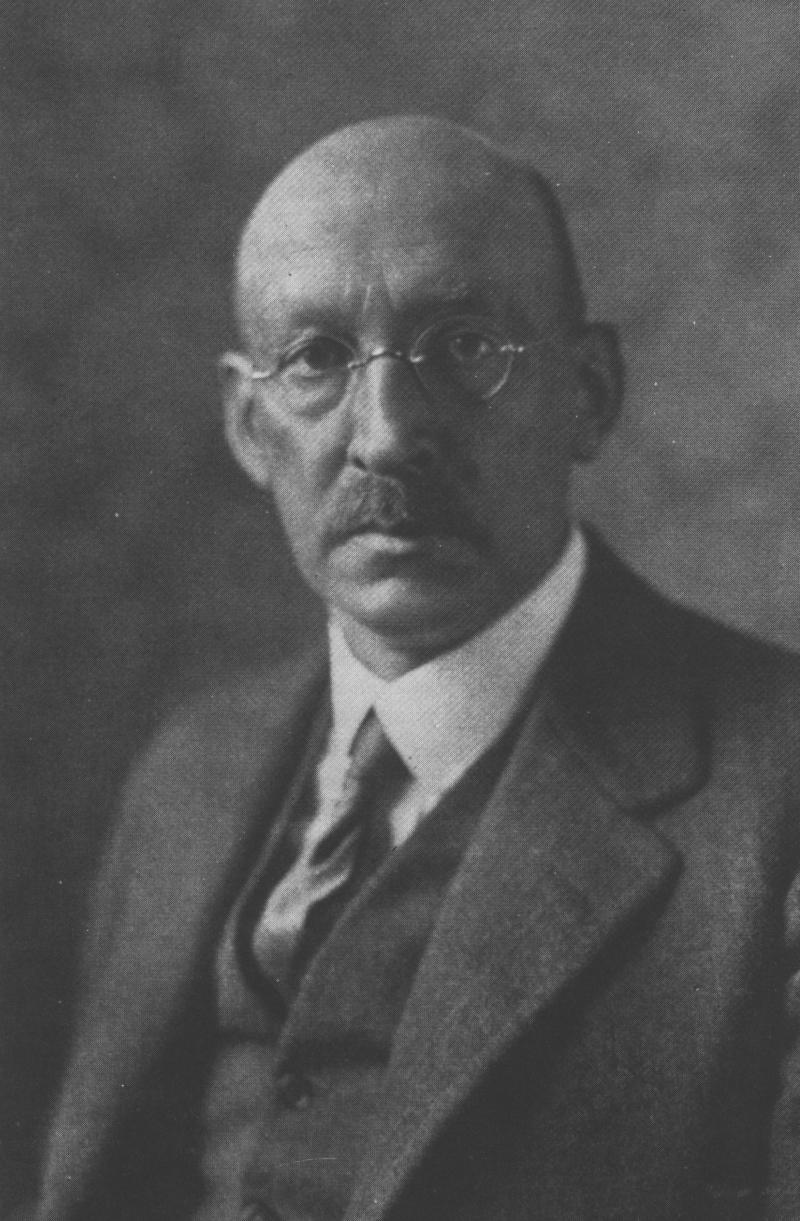
Ernst Poensgen (1926)

Carl Albert Ernst Poensgen (born 19 September 1871 in Düsseldorf; died 22 July 1949 in Bern) was a German entrepreneur and patron of the city of Düsseldorf.

== Literature ==
- Gerhard Th. Mollin: Poensgen, Ernst. In: New German Biography (NDB). Volume 20, Duncker & Humblot, Berlin 2001, ISBN 3-428-00201-6 , p. 569 f. ( Digitized version ).
- Hans Radandt: Ernst Poensgen. In: Gerhart Hass u. a. (Ed.): Biographical lexicon on German history. From the beginning until 1945. Deutscher Verlag der Wissenschaften, Berlin 1970.
- Reinhard Neebe: Big Industry, State and NSDAP 1930–1933: Paul Silverberg and the Reich Association of German Industry in the Crisis of the Weimar Republic (= critical studies on historical science . Volume 45). Vandenhoeck and Ruprecht, 1981, ISBN 3-525-35703-6 .
- Holger Menne, Michael Farrenkopf: Forced labor in the Ruhr mining industry during the Second World War. Special inventory of the sources in North Rhine-Westphalian archives. (= Publications from the German Mining Museum Bochum, No. 123; publications of the Mining Archive, No. 15). Self-published by the German Mining Museum Bochum, 2004, ISBN 3-937203-06-0 .
- James Stewart Martin: All Honorable Men. Little, Brown and Company, Boston, USA 1950.
- Ursula Salentin, Liselotte Hammerschmidt: Chronicle of the Villa Hammerschmidt and its residents. 1st edition. Bastei-Lübbe, 1991, ISBN 3-404-65087-5 .
- Alfred Sohn-Rethel: Industry and National Socialism. Notes from the> Central European Business Day <. Carl Freytag (ed.). Wagenbach, Berlin 1992.
- Klaus-Dietmar Henke: The American occupation of Germany. Oldenbourg Wissenschaftsverlag, 1996.
- Eugene Davidson: The Making of Adolf Hitler: The Birth and Rise of Nazism. University of Missouri Press, Columbia 1997.
- Paul Erker, Toni Pierenkemper: German entrepreneurs between war economy and reconstruction. Oldenbourg Wissenschaftsverlag, 1999.
- Doris Pfleiderer: Germany and the Youngplan. The role of the Reich government, Reichsbank and economy in the creation of the Young Plan. Dissertation. Faculty of History, Social and Economic Sciences at the University of Stuttgart, Historical Institute of the University of Stuttgart, 2002.
