= Aortic regurgitation =

- Other names: Aortic insufficiency
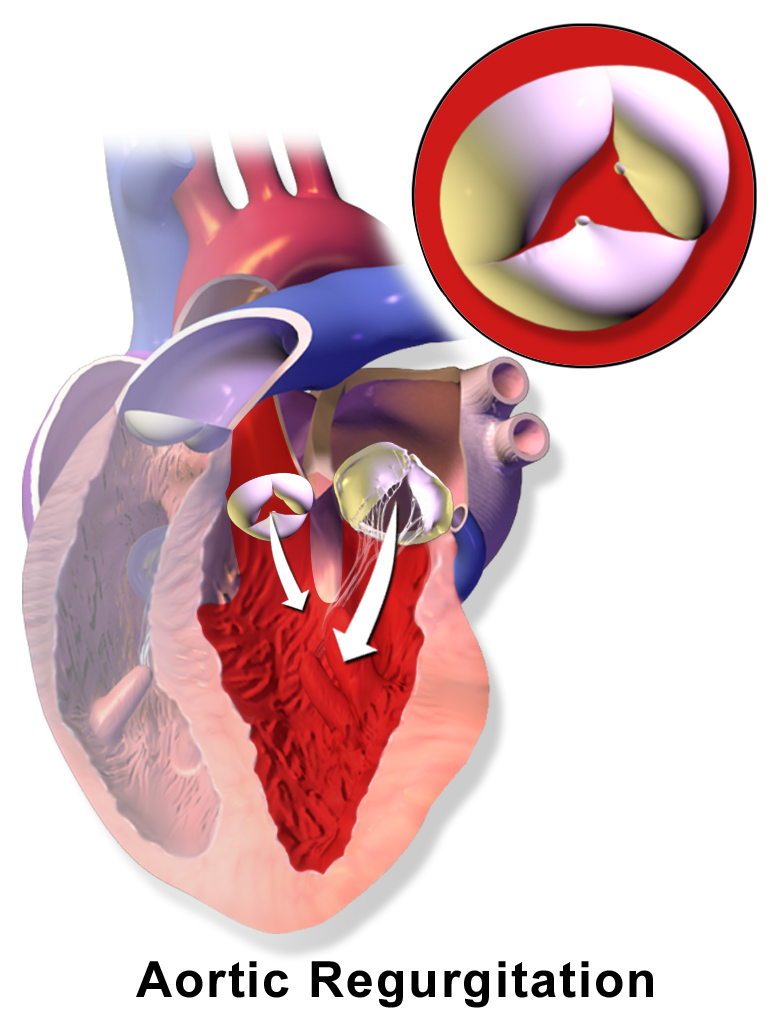
- Illustration of aortic regurgitation
- Specialty: Cardiology
- Symptoms: Dyspnea on exertion, Orthopnea
- Causes: Aortic root dilation
- Diagnostic method: Transthoracic echocardiography
- Treatment: Vasodilators(depends on the individuals condition, maybe surgery Aortic valve replacement)

Aortic regurgitation (AR), also known as aortic insufficiency (AI), is the leaking of the aortic valve of the heart that causes blood to flow in the reverse direction during ventricular diastole, from the aorta into the left ventricle. As a consequence, the cardiac muscle is forced to work harder than normal.

== Signs and symptoms ==
Symptoms of aortic regurgitation are similar to those of heart failure and include the following:

- Dyspnea on exertion
- Orthopnea
- Paroxysmal nocturnal dyspnea
- Palpitations
- Angina pectoris
- Cyanosis (in acute cases)

== Causes ==
In terms of the cause of aortic regurgitation, is often due to the aortic root dilation (annuloaortic ectasia), which is idiopathic in over 80% of cases, but otherwise may result from aging, syphilitic aortitis, osteogenesis imperfecta, aortic dissection, Behçet's disease, reactive arthritis and systemic hypertension. Aortic root dilation is the most common cause of aortic regurgitation in developed countries. Additionally, aortic regurgitation has been linked to the use of some medications, specifically medications containing fenfluramine or dexfenfluramine isomers and dopamine agonists. Other potential causes that affect the valve directly include Marfan syndrome, Ehlers–Danlos syndrome, ankylosing spondylitis, and systemic lupus erythematosus. In acute cases of aortic regurgitation, the main causes are infective endocarditis, aortic dissection or trauma.

== Pathophysiology ==
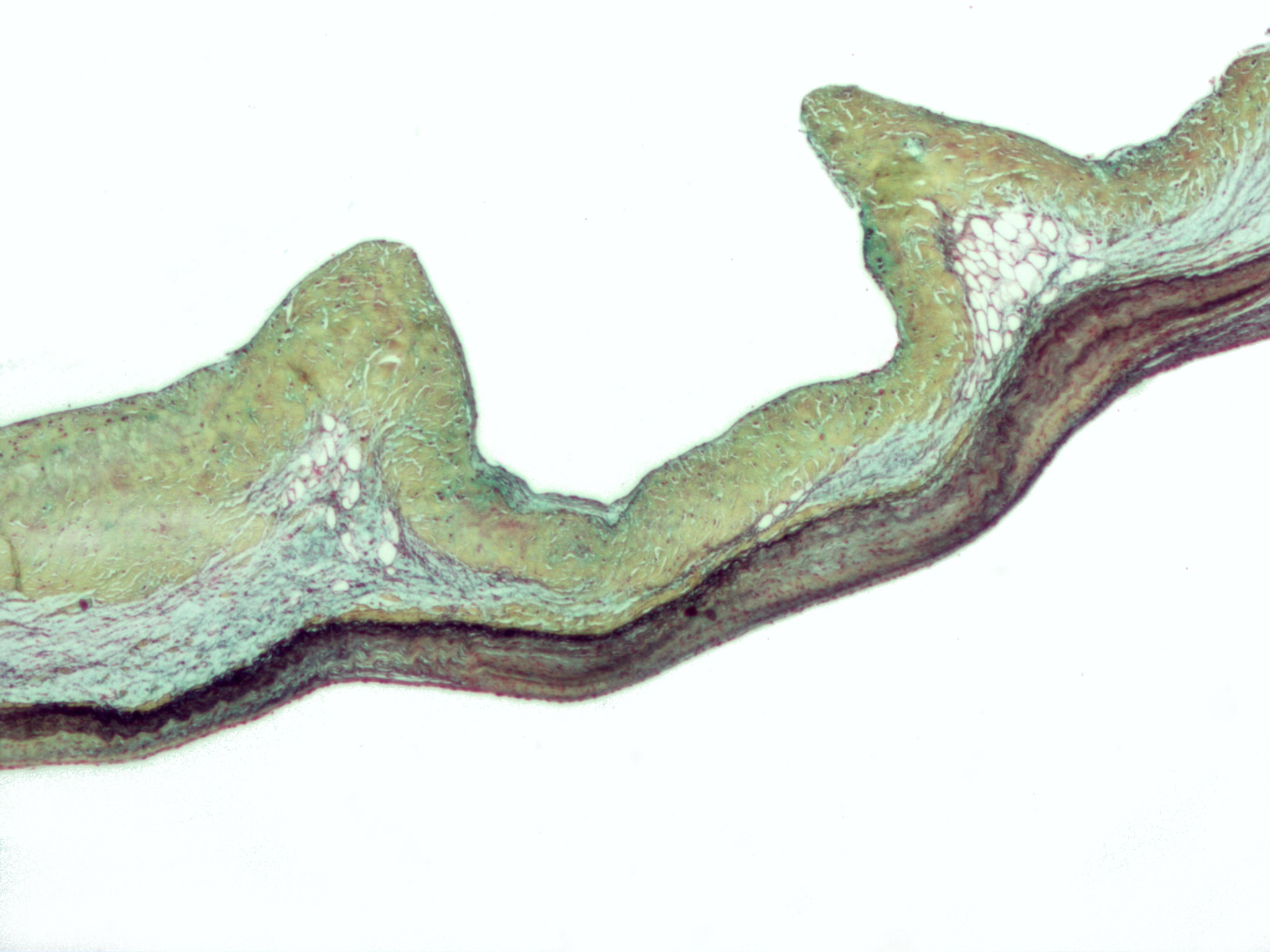
Micrograph of myxomatous degeneration – a cause of aortic regurgitation.

The mechanism of aortic regurgitation, comprises the pressure in the left ventricle falling below the pressure in the aorta, the aortic valve is not able to completely close. This causes a leaking of blood from the aorta into the left ventricle. This means that some of the blood that was already ejected from the heart is regurgitating back into the heart. The percentage of blood that regurgitates back through the aortic valve due to AR is known as the regurgitant fraction. This regurgitant flow causes a decrease in the diastolic blood pressure in the aorta, and therefore an increase in the pulse pressure. Since some of the blood that is ejected during systole regurgitates back into the left ventricle during diastole, there is decreased effective forward flow in AR.

While diastolic blood pressure is diminished and the pulse pressure widens, systolic blood pressure generally remains normal or can even be slightly elevated, this is because sympathetic nervous system and the renin-angiotensin-aldosterone axis of the kidneys compensate for the decreased cardiac output. Catecholamines will increase the heart rate and increase the strength of ventricular contraction, directly increasing cardiac output. Catecholamines will also cause peripheral vasoconstriction, which causes increased systemic vascular resistance and ensures that organs are adequately perfused. Renin, a proteolytic enzyme, cleaves angiotensinogen to angiotensin I, which is converted to angiotensin II. In the case of chronic aortic with resultant cardiac remodeling, heart failure will develop, and it is possible to see systolic pressures diminish. Aortic regurgitation causes both volume overload (elevated preload) and pressure overload (elevated afterload) of the heart.

The volume overload, due to elevated pulse pressure and the systemic effects of neuroendocrine hormones causes left ventricular hypertrophy (LVH). There is both concentric hypertrophy and eccentric hypertrophy in AI. The concentric hypertrophy is due to the increased left ventricular pressure overload associated with AI, while the eccentric hypertrophy is due to volume overload caused by the regurgitant fraction.

Physiologically, in individuals with a normally functioning aortic valve, the valve is only open when the pressure in the left ventricle is higher than the pressure in the aorta. This allows the blood to be ejected from the left ventricle into the aorta during ventricular systole. The amount of blood that is ejected by the heart is known as the stroke volume. Under normal conditions, >50% of the blood in a filled left ventricle is ejected into the aorta to be used by the body. After ventricular systole, the pressure in the left ventricle decreases as it relaxes and begins to fill up with blood from the left atrium. This relaxation of the left ventricle (early ventricular diastole) causes a fall in its pressure. When the pressure in the left ventricle falls below the pressure in the aorta, the aortic valve will close, preventing blood in the aorta from going back into the left ventricle.

== Diagnosis ==
Ultrasound showing aortic regurgitation and vegetations on the aortic valve.

In terms of the diagnosis of aortic regurgitation a common test for the evaluation of the severity is transthoracic echocardiography, which can provide two-dimensional views of the regurgitant jet, allow measurement of velocity, and estimate jet volume. The findings in severe aortic regurgitation, based on the 2012 American College of Cardiology/American Heart Association guidelines include:

- An AI color jet width > 65 % of the left ventricular outflow tract diameter
- Doppler vena contracta width > 0.6 cm
- The pressure half-time of the regurgitant jet is < 200 ms
- Early termination of the mitral inflow
- Holodiastolic flow reversal in the descending aorta.
- Regurgitant volume > 60 ml
- Regurgitant fraction > 50 %
- Estimated regurgitant orifice area > 0.3 cm^{2}
- Increased left ventricular size

Chest X-ray can assist in making the diagnosis, showing left ventricular hypertrophy and dilated aorta. ECG typically indicates left ventricular hypertrophy. Cardiac chamber catheterization assists in assessing the severity of regurgitation and any left ventricular dysfunction.

=== Physical examination ===
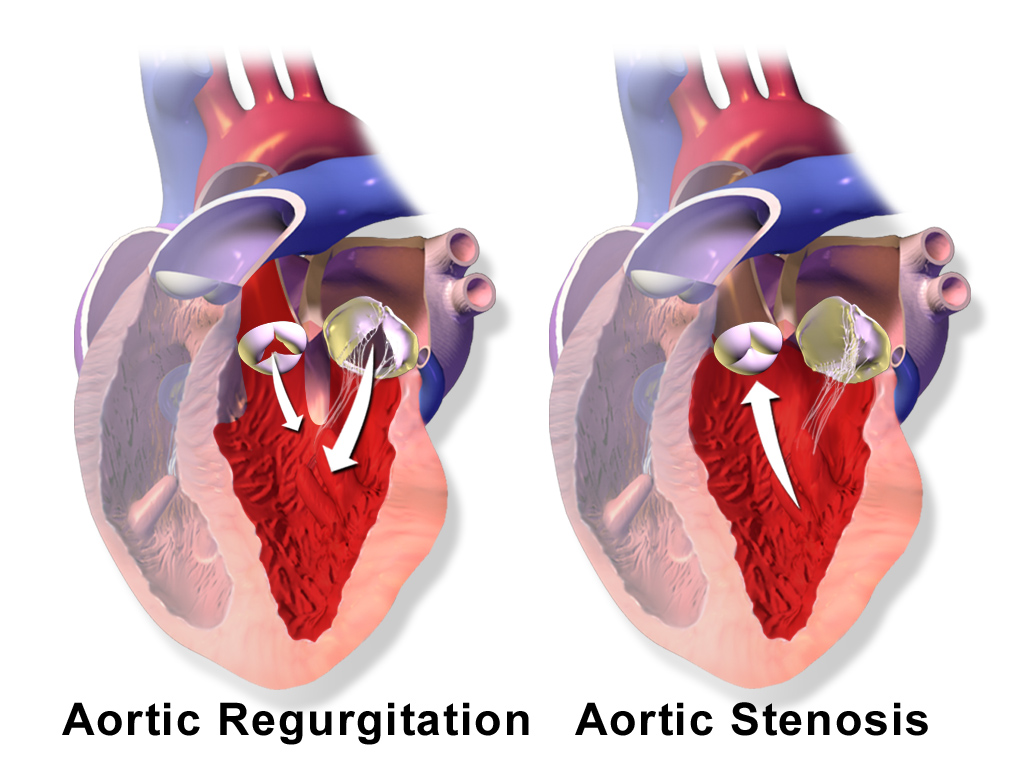
Aortic valve regurgitation vs aortic valve stenosis

Phonocardiograms from normal and abnormal heart sounds

The physical examination of an individual with aortic regurgitation involves auscultation of the heart to listen for the murmur of aortic regurgitation and the S3 heart sound (S3 gallop correlates with development of LV dysfunction). The murmur of chronic aortic regurgitation is typically described as early diastolic and decrescendo, which is best heard in the third left intercostal space and may radiate along the left sternal border.

If there is increased stroke volume of the left ventricle due to volume overload, an ejection systolic 'flow' murmur may also be present when auscultating the same aortic area. Unless there is concomitant aortic valve stenosis, the murmur should not start with an ejection click. There may also be an Austin Flint murmur, a soft mid-diastolic rumble heard at the apical area; it appears when a regurgitant jet of blood from severe aortic regurgitation partially closes the anterior mitral leaflet. Peripheral physical signs of aortic regurgitation are related to the high pulse pressure and the rapid decrease in blood pressure during diastole due to blood returning to the heart from the aorta through the incompetent aortic valve, although the usefulness of some of the eponymous signs has been questioned: Phonocardiograms detect AI by having electric voltage mimic the sounds the heart makes.Characteristics- indicative of aortic regurgitation are as follow:

- Corrigan's pulse: Rapid upstroke and collapse of pulses
- De Musset's sign: Head bob with each heartbeat
- Quincke's sign: Capillary pulsations
- Traube's sign: Systolic and diastolic sounds heard over femoral arteries
- Duroziez's sign: Systolic and diastolic bruit heard with compression of femoral artery
- Landolfi's sign
- Becker's sign
- Müller's sign
- Mayne's sign
- Rosenbach's sign
- Gerhardt's sign
- Hill's sign
- Lincoln sign
- Sherman sign

=== Classification ===
The hemodynamic sequelae of AI are dependent on the rate of onset of AI. Therefore, can be acute or chronic as follows:

Aortic regurgitation

- Acute aortic regurgitation In acute AR, as may be seen with acute perforation of the aortic valve due to endocarditis, there will be a sudden increase in the volume of blood in the left ventricle. The ventricle is unable to deal with the sudden change in volume. The filling pressure of the left ventricle will increase. This causes pressure in the left atrium to rise, and the individual will develop pulmonary edema. Severe acute aortic regurgitation is considered a medical emergency. There is a high mortality rate if the individual does not undergo immediate surgery for aortic valve replacement.
- Chronic aortic regurgitation If the individual survives the initial hemodynamic derailment that acute AR presents, the left ventricle adapts by its eccentric hypertrophy and dilatation with a subsequent compensated volume overload. The left ventricular filling pressures will revert to normal and the individual will no longer have overt heart failure. In this compensated phase, the individual may be totally asymptomatic and may have normal exercise tolerance. Eventually (typically after a latency period) the left ventricle will become decompensated, and filling pressures will increase. Some individuals enter this decompensated phase asymptomatically, treatment for AR involves aortic valve replacement prior to this decompensation phase.

== Treatment ==
Aortic regurgitation can be treated either medically or surgically, depending on the acuteness of presentation, the symptoms and signs associated with the disease process, and the degree of left ventricular dysfunction. Surgical treatment in asymptomatic patients has been recommended if the ejection fraction falls to 50% or below, in the face of progressive and severe left ventricular dilatation, or with symptoms or abnormal response to exercise testing. For both groups of patients, surgery before the development of worsening ejection fraction/LV dilatation is expected to reduce the risk of sudden death, and is associated with lower peri-operative mortality. Also, surgery is optimally performed immediately in acute cases.

=== Medical treatment ===
Losartan is a type of angiotensin II receptor antagonist.

Medical therapy of chronic aortic regurgitation that is stable and asymptomatic involves the use of vasodilators. Trials have shown a short-term benefit in the use of ACE inhibitors or angiotensin II receptor antagonists, nifedipine, and hydralazine in improving left ventricular wall stress, ejection fraction, and mass. The goal in using these pharmacologic agents is to decrease the afterload so that the left ventricle is somewhat spared. The regurgitant fraction may not change significantly, since the gradient between the aortic and left ventricular pressures is usually fairly low at the initiation of treatment. Other rather conservative medical treatments for stable and asymptomatic cases include low sodium diet, diuretics, digoxin, calcium blockers and avoiding very strenuous activity.

As of 2007, the American Heart Association no longer recommends antibiotics for endocarditis prophylaxis before certain procedures in patients with aortic regurgitation. Antibiotic prophylaxis to prevent endocarditis before gastrointestinal or genitourinary procedures is no longer recommended for any patient with valvular disease. Cardiac stress test is useful in identifying individuals that may be best suited for surgical intervention. Radionuclide angiography is recommended and useful when the systolic wall stress is calculated and combined to the results.

=== Surgery ===
A surgical treatment for AR is aortic valve replacement; this is currently an open-heart procedure. In the case of severe acute aortic regurgitation, all individuals should undergo surgery, if there are no absolute contraindications (for surgery). Individuals with bacteremia with aortic valve endocarditis should not wait for treatment with antibiotics to take effect, given the high mortality associated with the acute AI. Replacement with an aortic valve homograft should be performed if feasible.

Indications for surgery for chronic severe aortic regurgitation
Symptoms	Ejection fraction	Additional Findings
Present (NYHA II-IV)	Any	none
Absent	> 50%	Abnormal exercise test, severe LV dilatation (systolic ventricular diameter >55 mm)
Absent	<=50 %	none
Cardiac surgery for other cause (i.e.: CAD, other valvular disease, ascending aortic aneurysm)

== Prognosis ==
The risk of death in individuals with aortic regurgitation, dilated ventricle, normal ejection fraction who are asymptomatic is about 0.2 percent per year. Risk increases if the ejection fraction decreases or if the individual develops symptoms.

Individuals with chronic (severe) aortic regurgitation follow a course that once symptoms appear, surgical intervention is needed. AI is fatal in 10 to 20% of individuals who do not undergo surgery for this condition. Left ventricle dysfunction determines to an extent the outlook for severity of aortic regurgitation cases.
