= Żubrów =

- Village
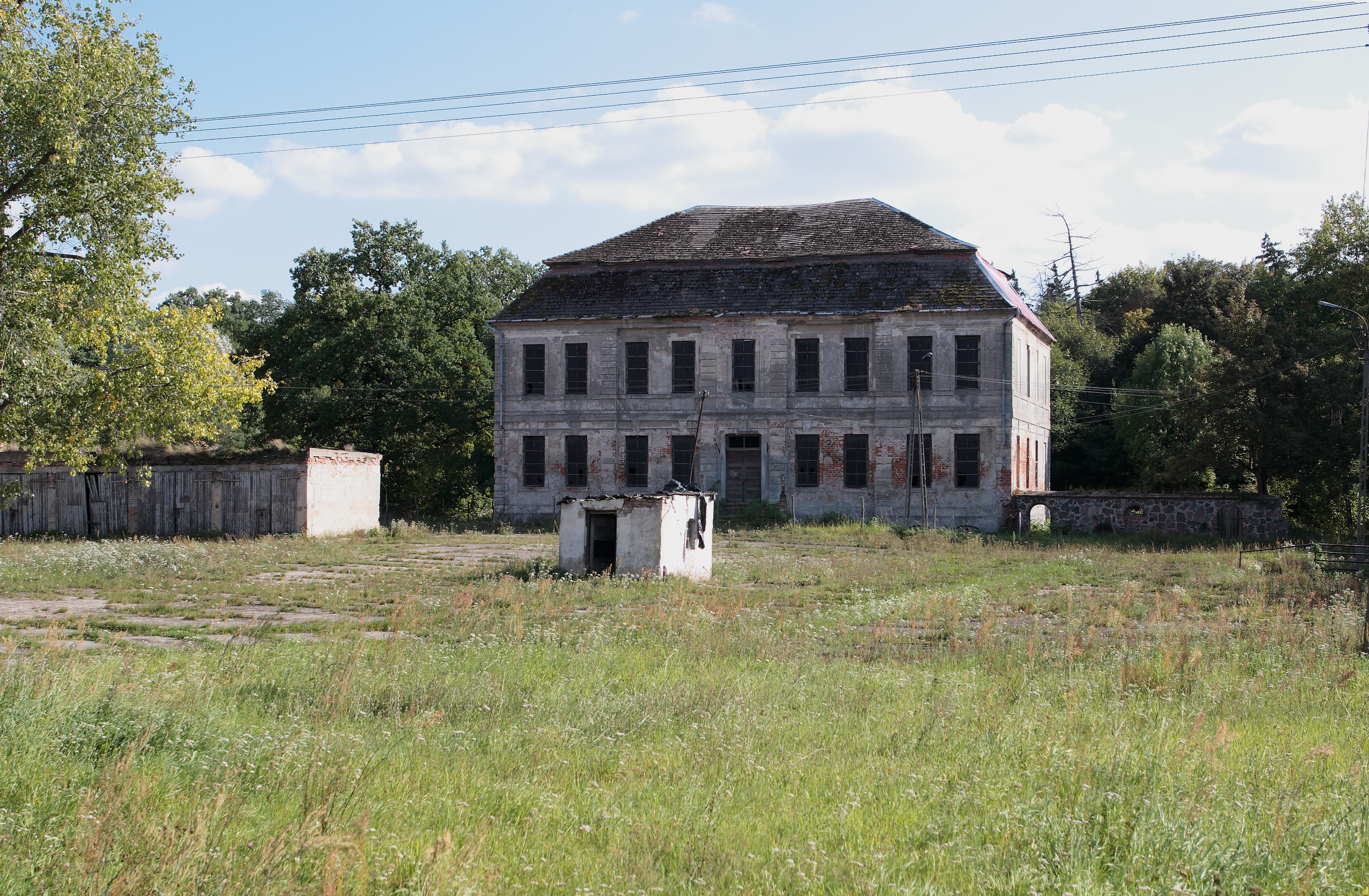
- Palace

- Location within Poland
- Coordinates: 52°29′N 15°24′E
- Country: Poland
- Voivodeship: Lubusz
- County: Sulęcin
- Gmina: Sulęcin

Żubrów [ˈʐubruf] is a village in the administrative district of Gmina Sulęcin, within Sulęcin County, Lubusz Voivodeship, in western Poland.
