= Reinhold Seeberg =

German Lutheran theologian

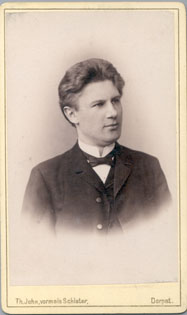
- Born: 24 March 1859
- Died: 23 October 1935 (aged 76); Ahrenshoop, Germany
- Spouse: Amanda Seeberg (m. 1886)
- Children: Erich Seeberg

Academic background
- Education: Imperial University of Dorpat

Academic work
- Discipline: Theology
- Sub-discipline: Dogmatic theology; historical theology
- School or tradition: Lutheranism
- Institutions: University of Erlangen; Friedrich Wilhelm University
- Doctoral students: Dietrich Bonhoeffer

Reinhold Seeberg (24 March 1859 – 23 October 1935) was a German Lutheran theologian. He was a professor of theology at Erlangen, where he had studied, and then in 1893 a professor of dogmatic theology at Friedrich Wilhelm University (founded as the University of Berlin in 1810).

A staunch German nationalist, Seeberg affirmed the divinely appointed role of Germany in the salvation of the world, and did not support the Weimar Republic in Germany. Seeberg was part of the movement for the modern revival of Luther and Reformation studies, including the repositioning of Martin Bucer as a mediating theologian between Lutheran and Reformed thought. His son, Erich Seeberg, became a significant theologian in his own right at the University of Berlin. His brother, Alfred Seeberg, was also a theologian.

== Scholarship and influence ==
Seeberg authored over two dozen books and many articles, covering a range of issues in historical theology, including early Christianity, Luther, the essence of Christianity, and Duns Scotus. His most famous text was the widely published and translated Textbook of the History of Doctrines. in five volumes. The latter work offered an encyclopedic understanding of the development of Christian doctrine, from the New Testament period into the 17th century, according to modern historical-critical methods. In it, Seeberg offers a more traditional assessment of the essentials of Christian teachings, in contrast to his colleague Adolph von Harnack, the elder historian of dogma at Berlin. Seeberg also emphasized the social nature of the Church, a teaching which became important to his students.

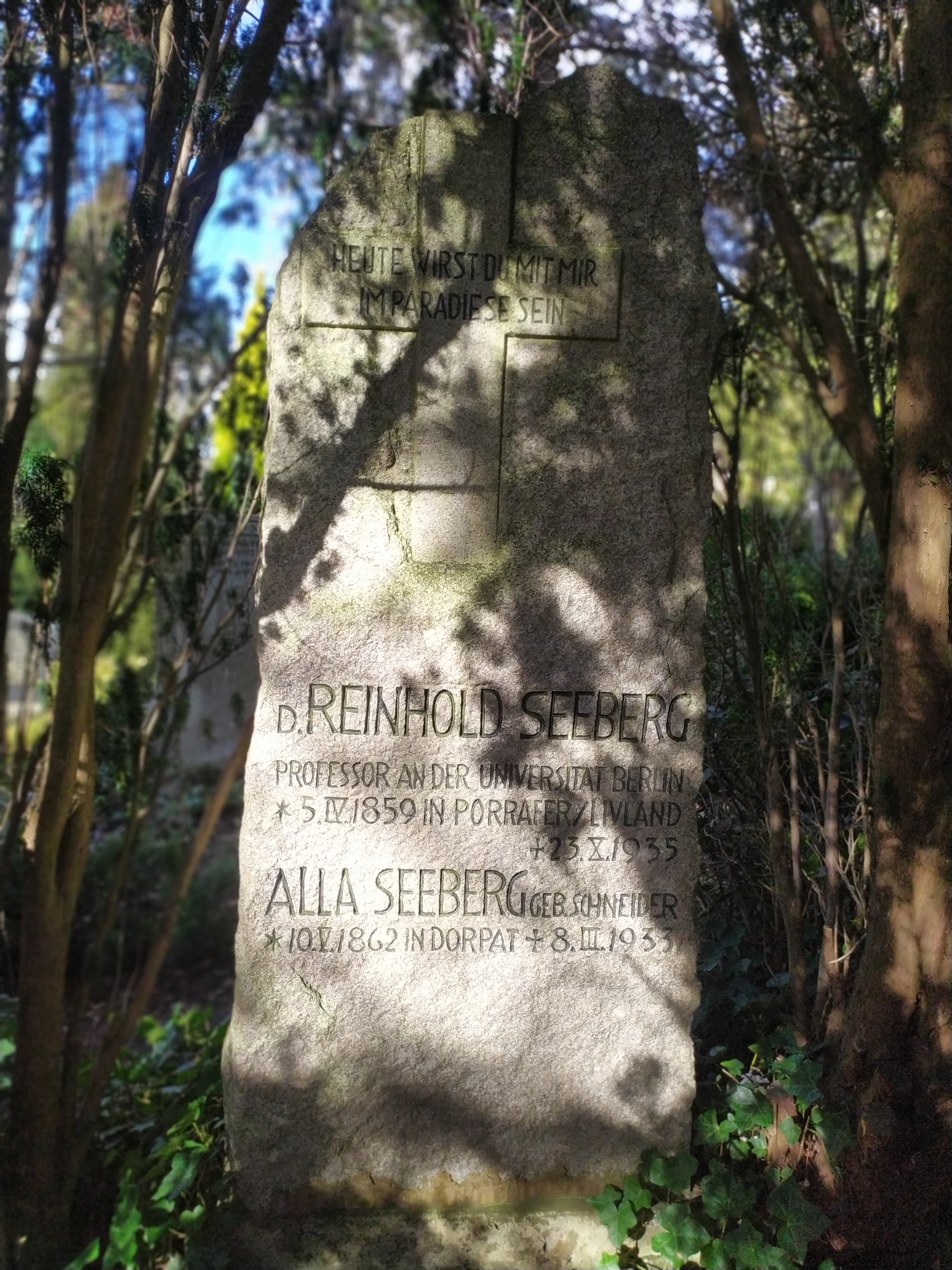
Gravestone in Ahrenshoop

Seeberg had several important students, including Werner Elert in church history and dogma, Hermann Sasse in Lutheran studies, and Dietrich Bonhoeffer in theology and ethics. Bonhoeffer adopted Seeberg's emphasis on the social nature of the Church, the epistemological and ethical dimensions of doctrines, and an anti-metaphysical emphasis in his own thought. Even when Bonhoeffer turned to a stronger Barthian view of revelation over religion, Bonhoeffer maintained a social emphasis in theology and ethics, which marked Seeberg's lasting influence.

== Other sources ==
- Friedrich Wilhelm Graf: Reinhold Seeberg, in: Profile des Luthertums. Biographien zum 20. Jahrhundert (ed. Wolf-Dieter Hauschild), Gütersloh 1998, pp. 617–676.
- Richard Cumming: Dietrich Bonhoeffer's concept of the cor curvum in se: a critique of Bonhoeffer's polemic with Reinhold Seeberg in Act and Being. In: Union Seminary Quarterly Review, Journal of Union Theological Seminary in the City of New York 62 (2010), Nr. 3–4, S. 116–133.
- Traugott Jähnichen: Seeberg, Reinhold. In: Biographisch-Bibliographisches Kirchenlexikon (BBKL). Band 9, Bautz, Herzberg 1995, ISBN 3-88309-058-1, Sp. 1307–1310.
