= Müller's sign =

Pulsation of the uvula during systole

- Differential diagnosis: aortic insufficiency

Müller's sign is the pulsation or bobbing of the uvula that occurs during systole. It can be seen in patients with severe aortic insufficiency. Müller's sign is caused by an increased stroke volume.

Müller's sign is named for Friedrich von Müller, a German physician.
