= Gau Hamburg =

Administrative division of Nazi Germany from 1933 to 1945

- Gau of Nazi Germany
- 1925–1945
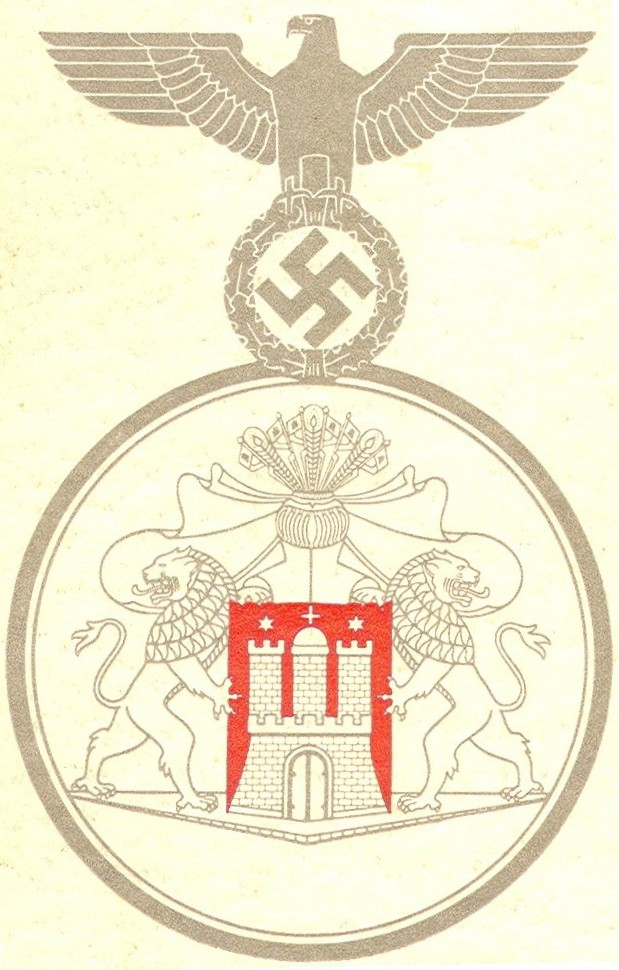
- Flag Coat of arms

- Capital: Hamburg
- Government
- Gauleiter
  - 1925–1926: Josef Klant
  - 1926–1928: Albert Krebs
  - 1928–1929: Hinrich Lohse
  - 1929–1945: Karl Kaufmann
- History
  - Establishment: 27 March 1925
  - Disestablishment: 8 May 1945
Preceded by	Succeeded by
Hamburg	Hamburg
- Today part of: Germany

The Gau Hamburg was an administrative division of Nazi Germany from 1933 to 1945 in the German city of Hamburg. Before that, from 1925 to 1933, it was the regional subdivision of the Nazi Party in that area.

== History ==
The Nazi Gau (plural Gaue) system was originally established in a party conference on 22 May 1926, in order to improve administration of the party structure. From 1933 onwards, after the Nazi seizure of power, the Gaue increasingly replaced the German states as administrative subdivisions in Germany.

At the head of each Gau stood a Gauleiter, a position which became increasingly more powerful, especially after the outbreak of the Second World War, with little interference from above. Local Gauleiters often held government positions as well as party ones and were in charge of, among other things, propaganda and surveillance and, from September 1944 onward, the Volkssturm and the defense of the Gau.

In the early years from 1925 to 1929 the position of Gauleiter in Hamburg was held by Josef Klant, Albert Krebs and Hinrich Lohse before Karl Kaufmann took over and held it from 1929 to 1945. Klant, Hamburg's original Gauleiter, held the post for only a short time, resigned and died in 1927. Lohse, who was Gauleiter of Schleswig-Holstein from 1926 to 1945, was also, from 1941 onward, in charge of the Reichskommissariat Ostland where he was responsible for the implementation of Nazi Germanization policies built on the foundations of the Generalplan Ost: the killing of almost all Jews, Romani people and Communists and the oppression of the local population were its necessary corollaries. He was sentenced to ten years in prison in 1948 but released in 1951, an extradition request by the Soviet Union having been refused, and died in 1964. Krebs, Gauleiter from 1926 to 1928, was expelled from the Nazi Party by Hitler in 1932 and published his autobiography after the war in which he was critical of Hitlers leadership style. Kaufmann, Hamburg's longest-serving Gauleiter, spent time in prison after the war but was released because of an injury. He cultivated a myth of the "good Gauleiter", claiming to have saved Hamburg from further destruction by surrendering it to the Allies in the final days of war but this was disproven. He also attempted to portray Hamburg as a liberal city in the Nazi era, contrary to the fact that he was the first Gauleiter to request and receive permission for the deportation of the Jewish population after Allied air raids on the city in September 1941. He died in Hamburg in 1969.

The Neuengamme concentration camp was located in the Gau Hamburg. Of the 106,000 prisoners that were sent to the camp 55,000 perished.
