= De Musset's sign =

- Differential diagnosis: Aorta regurgitation

De Musset's sign is a type of rhythmic bobbing of the head in synchrony with the beating of the heart, seen in severe aortic regurgitation.

This sign occurs as a result of blood from the aorta regurgitating into the left ventricle due to a defect in the aortic valve. The nodding is an indication that the systolic pulse is being felt by the individual because of the increased pulse pressure resulting from the aortic insufficiency.

The sign is named after the French poet Alfred de Musset after his brother noticed him exhibiting it.

== See also ==
- Aortic aneurysm
- Tremor
