= Pan-German League =

German nationalist organization (1891–1939)

The Pan-German League (German: Alldeutscher Verband) was a Pan-German nationalist organization which was officially founded in 1891, a year after the Zanzibar Treaty was signed. Primarily dedicated to the German question of the time, it held positions on German imperialism, antisemitism, the Polish question, and support for German minorities in other countries. The party embraced Völkism, expansionism, Pan-Germanism, militarism, nationalism, and racial ideas.

The purpose of the league was to nurture and protect the ethos of German nationality as a unifying force. By 1922, the League had grown to over 40,000 paying members. Berlin housed the central seat of the league, including its president and its executive, which was capped at a maximum of 300. Full gatherings of the league happened at the Pan-German Congress. Although numerically small, the League enjoyed a disproportionate influence on the German state through connections to the middle class, the political establishment and the media, as well as links to the 300,000 strong Agrarian League.

== Background ==
The origins of the Pan-German League lie in the growing movement for German colonial expansion, which gained traction over the course of the 1880s. In order to gain public support for the passing of the Steamboat Subsidy Act of 1885, which was a precursor to a state-funded colonial policy, chancellor Otto von Bismarck raised public outrage against British deals with both France and Portugal in dividing up Africa. Membership in pro-colonial societies, such as the Kolonialverein (Colonial Society) and the Central-Verein für Handelsgeographie (Central Society for Commercial Geography) grew rapidly. In the following year, colonist Carl Peters, who had acquired the majority of Germany's colonial holdings up to this point, returned from Africa, and, using the public awareness following the steamboat subsidy debate to initiate a congress on German overseas interests. Taking place from 13-16 September 1886, the congress ended with the establishment of the Allgemeiner Deutscher Verband zur Förderung überseeischer deutsch-nationaler Interessen (General German Society for the Furthering of German National Oversea Interests). The Society was not successful and marked by internal strife and after Peters left again for Africa, it dissolved.

== History ==
=== Foundation and early struggles (1890–1894) ===
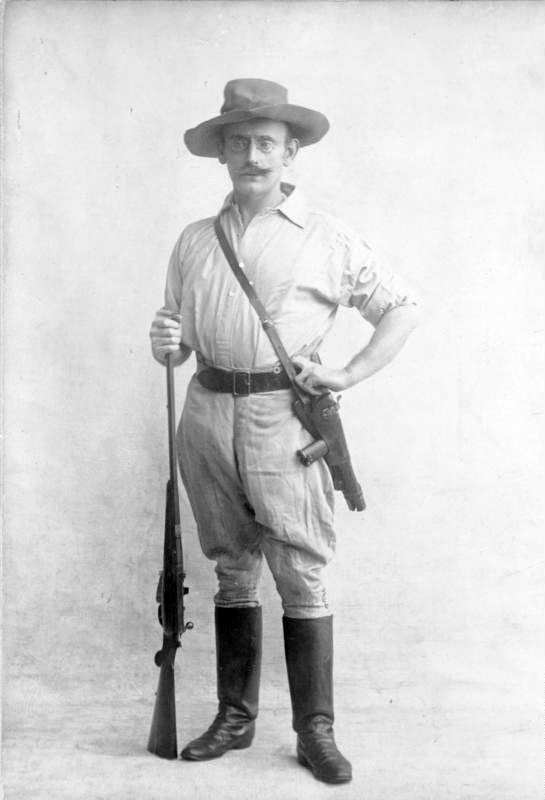
Colonialist Carl Peters was instrumental in the establishment of the Pan-German League.

On 1 July 1890, the German Empire signed the Heligoland-Zanzibar Treaty with Great Britain. The treaty was the first major sign of the new foreign policy of Emperor Wilhelm II, following the dismissal of chancellor Bismarck earlier in the year. The pro-colonial, national-conservative factions within Germany strongly opposed the treaty, as it gave away colonial possessions in Africa to the British. Peters was particularly negative, declaring that Germany had exchanged "two kingdoms, Witu and Uganda [...] for a bathtub." Shortly before the signing of the treaty, on 24 June 1890, a declaration, signed by four Germans living in Switzerland, appeared in several German newspapers, titled "Germany awake!", calling for Germans to oppose the treaty. In another letter three weeks later, the authors called for the foundation of a National League, "the purpose of which should be to give expression to what we wanted and expected of a national government in situations similar to the situation created by the Anglo-German treaty". By 1 August 1890, Alfred Hugenberg had picked up the call and declared himself temporarily in control of the management of such a league, while at the same time calling on Peters to become its leader. Peters, who had just recently returned from Africa, originally refused, not wanting to antagonise the German government, which he hoped would fund his further East African endeavours.

The first official meeting of the organisation that would become the Pan-German League took place in Frankfurt am Main on 28 September 1890, presided over by university professor John Wislicenus and attended by seven people. As a result of the meeting, Hugenberg and Wislicenus issued another call to action. After the initial political struggles over the Heligoland-Zanzibar Treaty had subsided, Peters eventually agreed to join forces, on the condition that the remnants of the earlier General German Society were included. On 25 January 1891, Peters personally invited a number of members of the Reichstag, the German federal parliament, and several other people to meet with Hugenberg and Wislicenus. As a result, the Allgemeiner Deutscher Verein, a nominal resurrection of Peters' original society, was founded on 9 April 1891 in Berlin. The League took a quotation by Frederick William, Elector of Brandenburg as its motto: Gedenke, daß Du ein Deutscher bist ("Remember that you are a German").

Peters initially took over the presidency of the League, but soon went back to Africa and resigned from his post, in order not to come into conflicts of interest between the League and the Foreign Office. Karl von der Heydt, a banker, took over the position. The early period of the League was difficult. While membership rose quickly, from around 2,000 in June 1891 to around 21,000 in May 1892, management of the League was lacking. The membership fee was set low, aimed to attract members, but the profits proved insufficient to run the operation. The League's journal, the Mitteilungen des allgemeinen deutschen Verbandes (News of the General German League) were only produced seven times between 1891 and 1893 and even those were not distributed to all members, since this required an additional fee. Expansion of the League outside of Berlin and Prussia was also scarce, partly due to improper management as well as bans on political associations in states like Saxony and Bavaria. A rise in open antisemitism in the Berlin branch affected the image of the organisation in the public eye. Additionally, von der Heydt and his general manager, along with other members of the League, attempted to form a new political party towards the end of 1892. Since the League had been formed as a body above party politics, this endeavour threatened its existence. The failed attempt to sell a "Calendar of all Germans", leading to a deficit of 6,000 marks, further weakened the League's position. By July 1894, membership had dropped to just 4,637.

A crisis meeting in Frankfurt am Main in the summer of 1893 was called by West-German branches of the League, against the declared will of the leadership, with the intention of dissolution. However, John Wislicenus again presided over the meeting and as a result, a formal meeting was arranged for 5 July 1893 in Berlin. Here, von der Heydt resigned along with many other members of the League's executive committee. Von der Heydt paid 4,000 of the 6,000 marks debt, with Peters covering the remaining 2,000 marks. The presidency of the League was taken over by Ernst Hasse, a university professor from Leipzig. Hasse, together with new general manager Adolf Lehr, put the League on a more secure financial footing. On 1 January 1894, the first issue of the new journal, the Alldeutsche Blätter, was released. At a meeting of the executive committee on 1 April 1894, a decision was made to change the name of the organisation to Alldeutscher Verein (Pan-German League). This came about as an amalgamation between the League with a society called Allgemeiner Deutscher Verein (General German Association), aimed at promoting German education, led by Albert von Levetzow, the president of the Reichstag. The term alldeutsch (pan-German) had been a suggestion by August Diederichs, a friend of Hasse's, who had set up a donation fund for the League under this name. The name change took effect from 1 July 1894.

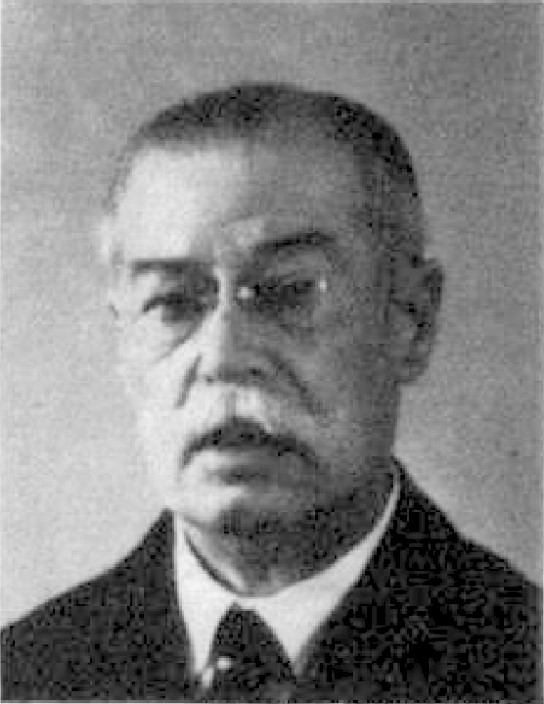
Heinrich Claß, president of the League from 1908 to 1939

The aim of the Alldeutscher Verband was to protest against government decisions which they believed could weaken Germany. A strong element of its ideology included social Darwinism. The Verband wanted to uphold German racial hygiene and were against breeding with so-called inferior races like the Jews and Slavs. Agitation against Poles was a central focus for the Pan-German League. The agitations of the Alldeutscher Verband influenced the German government and generally supported the foreign policy developed by Otto von Bismarck.

One of the prominent members of the league was the sociologist Max Weber who, at the League's congress in 1894 argued that Germanness (Deutschtum) was the highest form of civilization. Weber left the league in 1899 because he felt it did not take a radical enough stance against Polish migrant workers in Germany. Later Weber went on to become one of the most prominent critics of German expansionism and of the Kaiser's war policies. He publicly attacked the Belgian annexation policy and unrestricted submarine warfare and later supported calls for constitutional reform, democratisation and universal suffrage.

The position of Pan-German League gradually evolved into biological racism, with belief that Germans are "superior race", and Germans need protection from mixing with other races, particularly Jews. By 1912 in the publication "If I were the Kaiser," Claß called on Germans to conquer eastern territories inhabited by "inferior" Slavs, depopulate their territories and settle German colonists there. There were also calls for expulsion of Poles living in Prussia.

The Alldeutscher Verband had an enormous influence on the German government during World War I, when they opposed democratization and were in favour of unlimited submarine war. Opponents of the Verband were called cowards. Influential figures in the Alldeutscher Verband founded the Vaterlandspartei in 1917 following the request of the majority of the German parliament to begin peace negotiations with the allies.

After World War I, the Alldeutscher Verband supported General Erich Ludendorff in his accusation against democrats and socialists that they had betrayed Germany and made the Germans lose the war. According to Ludendorff and the Verband, the army should not have been held responsible for the German defeat. Ludendorff, however, had declared that the war was lost in October 1918, before the German November Revolution. That fanciful allegation was known as the "Stab-in-the-back myth" (Dolchstosslegende). Membership in the league was overwhelmingly composed of middle- and upper-class males. Most members' occupations reflected the League's emphasis on education, property ownership and service to the state.

The League was clearly close ideologically to the Nazis and anticipated many of their basic ideas, such as the demand that the individual Germans should unconditionally submit to the national whole, represented by the state and the authorities, or the idea of expansion to the east in order to gain "Living Space" (Lebensraum). Still, the League's concrete relations with the Nazis were not always smooth. In 1932, there was a moment when the Pan-German League accused the Nazis of betraying the national idea and called on their supporters to support the rival German National People's Party (DNVP). The Nazis, who came to power the next year, did not forget that incident.

After the Nazis came to power, the Pan-Germans were for a time tolerated due to their ideological closeness, but on the eve of the Second World War were finally dissolved by Reinhard Heydrich on March 13, 1939, on the grounds that their program (namely the unification of all Germans in one Greater Germany) had been fulfilled with the Austrian Anschluss and the annexation of the Sudetenlands.

== See also ==
- German entry into World War I

== Bibliography ==
- Baranowski, Shelley (2010). Nazi Empire: German Colonialism and Imperialism from Bismarck to Hitler. Cambridge University Press.
- Chickering, Roger (2021). We Men Who Feel Most German: Cultural Study of the Pan-German League, 1886-1914. Routledge. ISBN 9780367230531.
- Hartwig, Edgar (1968), "Alldeutscher Verband (ADV)", in Fricke, Dieter (ed.), Die bürgerlichen Parteien in Deutschland - Handbuch der Geschichte der bürgerlichen Parteien und anderen bürgerlichen Interessenorganisationen vom Vormärz bis zum Jahre 1945, vol. 1, Leipzig: VEB Bibliographisches Institut, pp. 1–26
- Harrison, Austin, The Pan-Germanic Doctrine. (1904) online free
- Hering, Rainer (2005). Konstruierte Nation: Der Alldeutsche Verband 1890 bis 1939 [Constructed Nation: The Pan-German League 1890 to 1939] (in German). Wallstein. ISBN 978-3892449188.
- Hering, Rainer (2014), "Academics and Radical Nationalism: The Pan-German League in Hamburg and the German Reich", in Jones, Larry Eugene (ed.), The German Right in the Weimar Republic - Studies in the History of German Conservatism, Nationalism, and Antisemitism, New York/Oxford: Berghahn Books, pp. 108–133
- Hofmeister, Björn (2014), "Realms of Leadership and Residues of Social Mobilization: The Pan-German League, 1918–33", in Jones, Larry Eugene (ed.), The German Right in the Weimar Republic - Studies in the History of German Conservatism, Nationalism, and Antisemitism, New York/Oxford: Berghahn Books, pp. 134–165
- Jackisch, Barry Andrew. 'Not a Large, but a Strong Right': The Pan-German League, Radical Nationalism, and Rightist Party Politics in Weimar Germany, 1918-1939. Bell and Howell Information and Learning Company: Ann Arbor. 2000.
- Jackisch, Barry A. (2012). The Pan-German League and Radical Nationalist Politics in Interwar Germany, 1918–39. Farnham: Ashgate Publishing. ISBN 978-1-4094-2761-2.
- Jackisch, Barry A. (2014), "Continuity and Change on the German Right: The Pan-German League and Nazism, 1918–39", in Jones, Larry Eugene (ed.), The German Right in the Weimar Republic - Studies in the History of German Conservatism, Nationalism, and Antisemitism, New York/Oxford: Berghahn Books, pp. 166–193
- Wertheimer, Mildred S. (1924). The Pan-German League 1890–1914. New York: Columbia University.
- Encyclopædia Britannica
