= Alfred Hugenberg =

German businessman and politician (1865–1951)

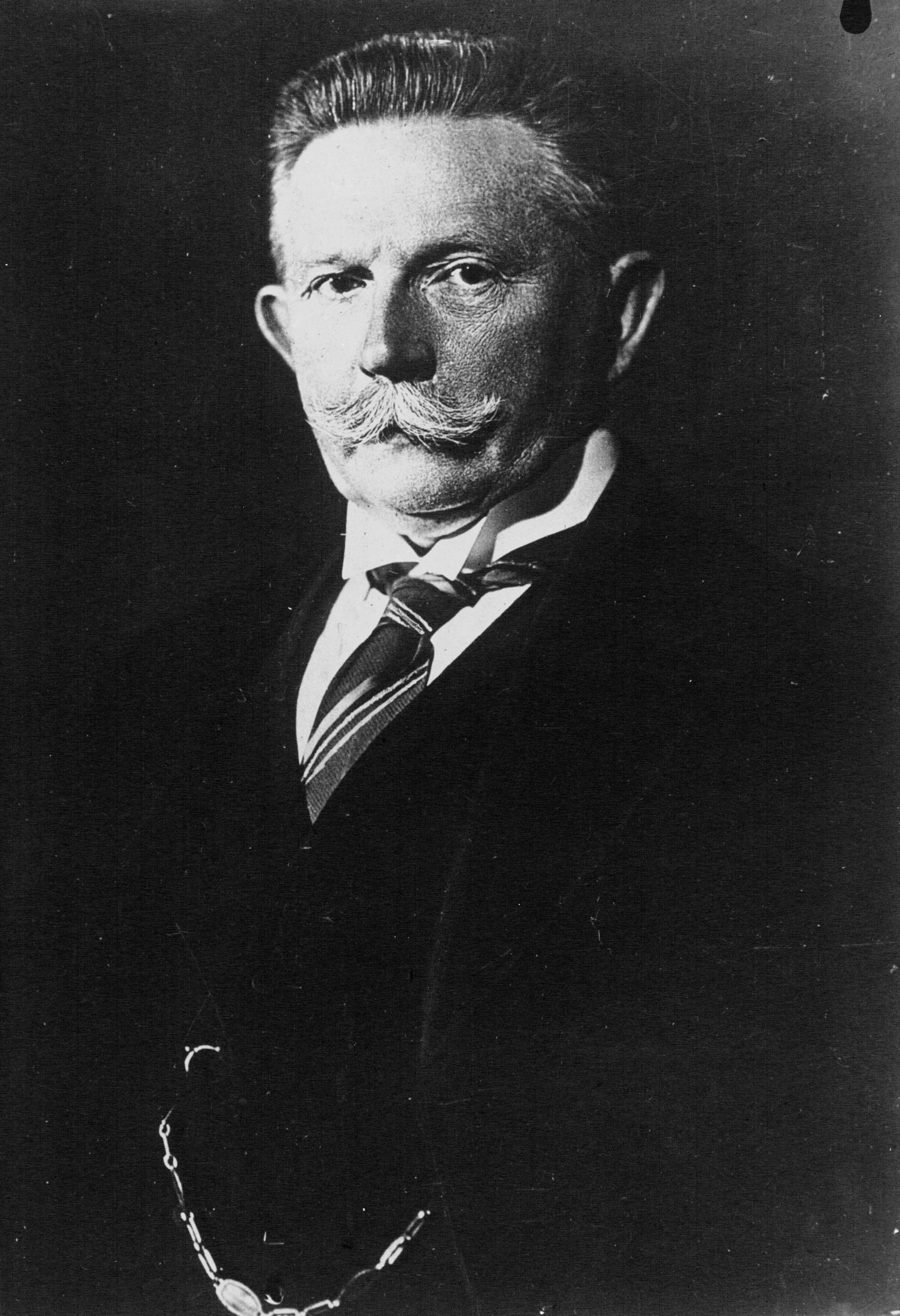
- Hugenberg in 1933

Reich Minister of Economics
- In office 30 January 1933 – 29 June 1933
- President: Paul von Hindenburg
- Chancellor: Adolf Hitler
- Preceded by: Hermann Warmbold
- Succeeded by: Kurt Schmitt

Reich Minister for Food and Agriculture
- In office 30 January 1933 – 29 June 1933
- President: Paul von Hindenburg
- Chancellor: Adolf Hitler
- Preceded by: Magnus von Braun
- Succeeded by: Richard Walther Darré

Chairman of the German National People's Party
- In office 21 October 1928 – 27 June 1933
- Preceded by: Kuno von Westarp
- Succeeded by: Party abolished

Member of the Reichstag
- In office 1920–1945
- Constituency: Westphalia North

Member of the German National Assembly
- In office 6 February 1919 – 21 May 1920

Personal details
- Born: Alfred Ernst Christian Alexander Hugenberg; 19 June 1865 Hanover, Kingdom of Hanover
- Died: 12 March 1951 (aged 85) Kükenbruch, West Germany
- Party: Independent (1933–1951)
- Other political affiliations: German National People's Party (1918–1933); German Fatherland Party (1917–1918)
- Spouse: Gertrud Adickes (m. 1900)
- Children: 4
- Education: Göttingen, Heidelberg, Berlin, Strassburg

Alfred Ernst Christian Alexander Hugenberg (19 June 1865 – 12 March 1951) was an influential German businessman and politician. An important figure in nationalist politics in Germany during the first three decades of the twentieth century, Hugenberg became the country's leading media proprietor during the 1920s. As leader of the German National People's Party, he played a part in helping Adolf Hitler become chancellor of Germany and served in his first cabinet in 1933, hoping to control Hitler and use him as his tool. The plan failed, and by the end of 1933, Hugenberg had been pushed to the sidelines. Although he continued to serve as a guest member of the Reichstag until 1945, he wielded no political influence. Following World War II, he was interned by the British in 1946 and classified as "exonerated" in 1951 after undergoing denazification.

Hugenberg's fundamental political and philosophical principles can be traced back to his youth. His university studies and early work organizing agricultural societies led him to view the independent farmer or small businessman as the ideal German. He believed in social Darwinism, despised communism, socialism and trade unions, and was, in general, skeptical of big business and finance. He thought that Germany needed an authoritarian government – ideally a monarchy – and strongly supported nationalism and imperialism in the belief that Germany could be secure only as a great power. The fall of the Hohenzollern monarchy at the end of World War I came as a tremendous shock, and from that point until the establishment of the Nazi state in 1933 he focused on bringing down the parliamentary government of the Weimar Republic.

Hugenberg earned degrees in both economics and law. In 1891, at the age of twenty-six, he co-founded the nationalist organization that later became the Pan-German League. He worked in the Prussian civil service and in private business before joining the Krupp steel works, where he was chairman of the board of directors from 1909 until 1918. His work there led to seats on other supervisory boards and trade associations. During World War I, Hugenberg was an annexationist who wanted the Empire to expand to the east through German settlements. He blamed Germany's defeat on Jews and socialists who had supposedly stabbed the German army in the back.

After the war, Hugenberg left Krupp to concentrate on politics and building up the media empire that he had started in 1916 when he bought the Scherl publishing house. That purchase was followed by the news agency Telegraphen-Union, numerous newspapers and in 1927 a controlling interest in the Universum-Film-AG (Ufa), a major film producer. Hugenberg's media outlets provided stiff and sometimes dominating competition to older liberal media companies such as Ullstein and Mosse.

As a representative of the German National People's Party (DNVP), Hugenberg was a member of the Weimar National Assembly from 1919–20 and then of the German Reichstag until 1945. For many years, he provided the majority of the DNVP's funds, and his influence dominated the right-wing press in Germany. As the most influential voice in the DNVP's pan-German bloc, he opposed the Dawes Plan, which attempted to resolve the issues surrounding Germany's reparations payments, in the belief that a return to the economic chaos of hyperinflation would bring down the Republic. Hugenberg became chairman of the DNVP after the party's substantial losses in the 1928 Reichstag elections. He obtained "dictatorial" leadership powers and tried to transform the party into a "Hugenberg movement". He also shifted emphasis to the extra-parliamentary sphere with the aim of forcing the replacement of parliamentary government by an authoritarian regime. His radicalism caused the DNVP to split, with many key industrialists leaving the party.

Hugenberg's first tentative media support of Adolf Hitler and the Nazi Party came following the failed Beer Hall Putsch in 1923. The relationship deepened in 1929 when the DNVP and Nazis joined forces in an unsuccessful bid to stop the Young Plan, a second attempt to resolve the reparations issue. The two parties were also part of the short-lived Harzburg Front of 1931 that was formed to create a united front against the government of Chancellor Heinrich Brüning. Both efforts at cooperation benefited the Nazis more than the DNVP. The Nazis gained the most from the radicalization of the middle classes, and the moderate elements in the DNVP continued to move away from the party.

By early 1933, Hugenberg realised that his attempt to ally with the Nazis had failed and that they presented a danger to the state and society. He nevertheless became Minister of Economics and of Food and Agriculture in the Hitler cabinet. He became increasingly isolated in the cabinet and failed in his attempt to become "economic dictator". He was forced out of the cabinet after five months, on the same day that the DNVP voted to disband. After that, he no longer had any political influence and, over time, also had to cede his media holdings to the Nazis.

After World War II, he was interned by the British. He died in 1951.

== Early years ==
=== Political philosophy ===
Born in Hanover to Carl Hugenberg, a royal Hanoverian official who in 1867 entered the Prussian Landtag as a member of the National Liberal Party, the young Hugenberg studied law in Göttingen, Heidelberg, and Berlin, as well as economics in Strassburg. As a child, he had a love of writing poetry, which was strongly discouraged by his father who instead raised Hugenberg to be a bureaucrat like himself. In 1891, Hugenberg was awarded a PhD at Strassburg for his dissertation Internal Colonization in Northwest Germany, in which he set out three ideas that guided his political thought for the rest of his life:

- The necessity for statist economic policies to allow German farmers to be successful;
- Despite the necessity for the state to assist farmers, the German farmer should be encouraged to act as an entrepreneur, thereby creating a class of successful farmers/small businessmen who would act as a bulwark against the appeal of the Marxist Social Democrats, whom Hugenberg viewed as a grave threat to the status quo;
- Finally, allowing German farmers to be successful required a policy of imperialism, as Hugenberg argued on social Darwinist grounds that the "power and significance of the German race" could be secured if Germany colonized other nations. Hugenberg maintained that Germany's prosperity depended upon having a great empire, and argued that, in the coming 20th century, Germany would have to battle three great rivals, namely Britain, the United States and Russia, for world supremacy.

Later in 1891, Hugenberg co-founded, along with Karl Peters, the ultra-nationalist General German League, and in 1894 its successor movement, the Pan-German League (German: Alldeutscher Verband). From 1894 to 1899, Hugenberg worked as a Prussian civil servant in Posen (modern Poznań, Poland). In 1900, he married his second cousin, Gertrud Adickes (1868–1960), with whom he had four children. Gertrude was the daughter of Franz Burchard Adickes, Mayor of Frankfurt.

The son of an upper-middle class family, Hugenberg initially resented the Junkers (landed nobility), but over time, he came to accept the idea of "feudal-industrial control of Germany", believing in an alliance of Junkers and industrialists. Alongside these beliefs, Hugenberg maintained an ardent belief in imperialism and opposition to democracy and socialism.

At the same time, Hugenberg became involved in a scheme in the Province of Posen in which the Prussian Settlement Commission bought land from Poles to settle ethnic Germans there. In 1899, Hugenberg called for "annihilation of Polish population". Hugenberg was strongly anti-Polish, and criticized the Prussian government for its "inadequate" Polish policies, favouring a more vigorous policy of Germanization.

Hugenberg initially took a role organizing agricultural societies before entering the civil service in the Prussian Ministry of Finance in 1903. Hugenberg came into conflict with his superiors, who opposed his plans to confiscate all the non-productive estates of the Junkers to settle hundreds of thousands of ethnic Germans who would become his idealised farmer-small businessmen and "Germanise" the East.

=== Chairman at Krupp Steel ===
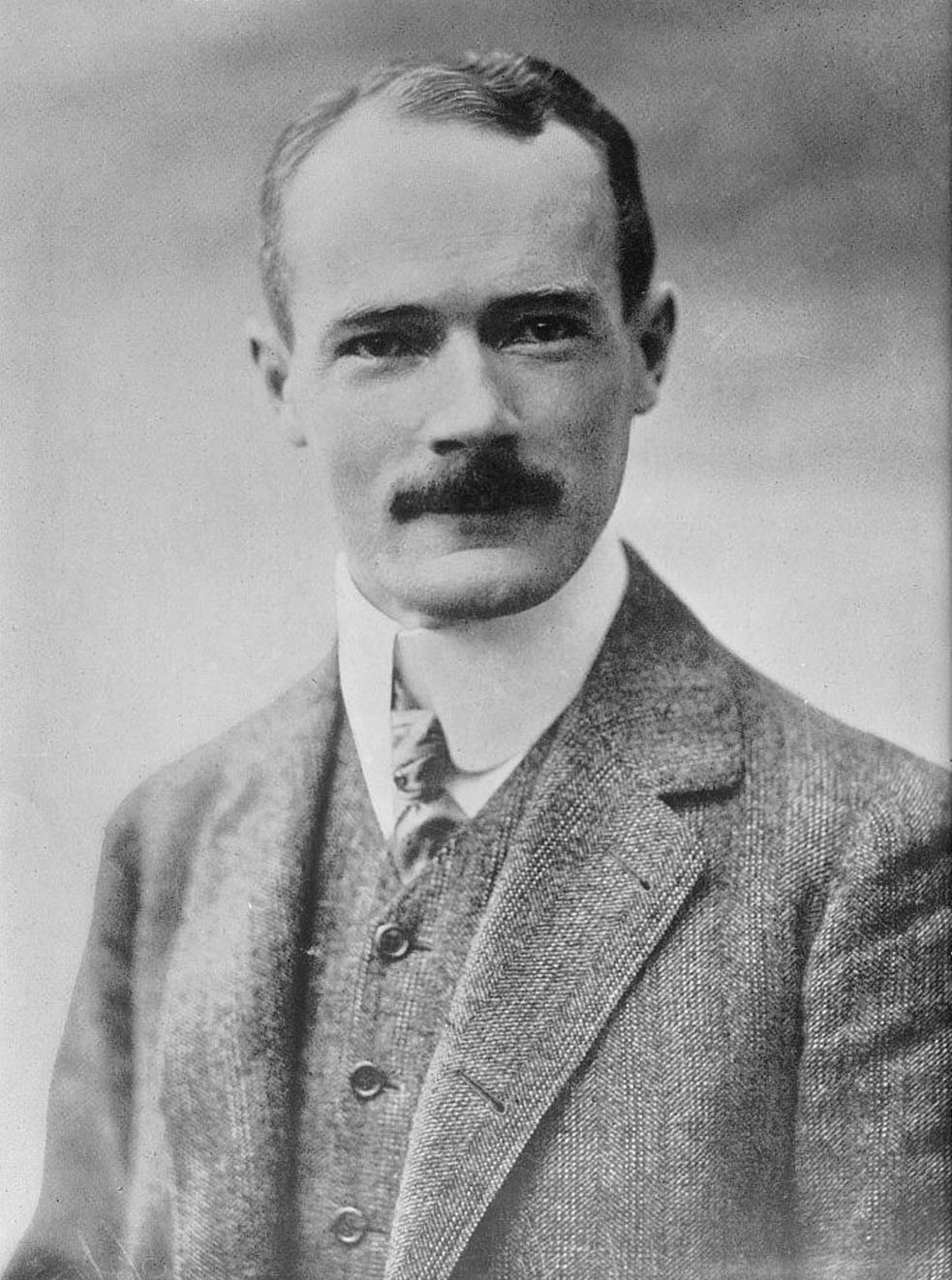
Gustav Krupp von Bohlen und Halbach in 1915

He subsequently left the public sector to pursue a career in business, and in 1909 he was appointed chairman of the supervisory board of Krupp Steel where he built up a close personal and political relationship with Baron Gustav Krupp von Bohlen und Halbach, the CEO of Krupp AG. Krupp had been "in search of a man of really superior intelligence" to run the finance department of Krupp AG and found that man in Hugenberg, with his "extraordinary" intelligence and work ethic. In 1902, Friedrich Alfred Krupp's homosexuality was revealed to the public. He killed himself or died from illness shortly after the Social Democratic newspaper Vorwärts published love letters he had written to his Italian male lovers. After Krupp's death, the entire firm of Krupp AG was left to his eldest daughter, Bertha Krupp. As Krupp AG was one of the world's largest arms manufacturers and the chief supplier of weapons to the German state, the management of Krupp AG was of some interest to the state, and Emperor Wilhelm II did not believe that a woman was capable of running a business. To solve this perceived problem, the Emperor had Bertha marry a career diplomat, Gustav von Bohlen und Halbach, who was regarded by the Emperor as a safe man to run Krupp AG. Gustav Krupp, as he was renamed by Wilhelm, knew little about running a business and so depended on his board to assist him. Hugenberg's role in the management of Krupp AG was thus considerably larger than would be indicated by his title of director of finance; in many ways, he was the man who effectively ran the Krupp corporation during his ten years at the firm between 1908 and 1918.

During his time at Krupp AG, Hugenberg was known for his "inflexibility", "stubbornness", and "self-righteousness" as he constantly fought with the two unions representing the workers, one allied with the Social Democrats (SPD) and the other with the Centre Party. Hugenberg did not approve of either union and instead sponsored a "yellow" union representing the management, making his tenure a time of endless disputes with the workers. Hugenberg favoured the idea of a Werksgemeinschaft (transl. economic community), where the Krupp family would act as the patriarchal authority to their workers, granting them higher wages and even junior shares in Krupp AG, in exchange for which the workers would be subservient and loyal to die Firma ("the Firm") as Krupp AG was always called. Very little came of his plans for a Werksgemeinschaft, and living conditions and wages for the workers at die Firma did not change very much during Hugenberg's time. Hugenberg's interest in having the workers own their own houses stemmed only from his interest in stopping demands for democracy and socialism. His strong social Darwinist views led him to argue that the problem of poverty was a genetic problem, with the poor inheriting bad genes that made them unsuccessful in life. Improving their living standards for him was only necessary to halt demands for political and social change, as opposed to a positive goal in and of itself.

At the time, Krupp AG was Europe's largest corporation and one of the largest corporations in the world, and Hugenberg's success in raising annual dividends from 8% in 1908 to 14% in 1913 won him much admiration in the world of German business. A more unwelcome appearance in the limelight occurred with the Kornwalzer affair, in which the Social Democrat Reichstag member Karl Liebknecht exposed industrial espionage by Hugenberg. The management of Krupp AG did not even try to deny the allegations of bribery and industrial espionage, with Krupp arguing in a press article that any attack on the firm of Krupp AG was an attack on the ability of the German state to wage war by the socialist-pacifist SPD, and although several junior employees of Krupp AG were convicted of corruption, Hugenberg and the rest of the Krupp board were never indicted. In 1912, Emperor Wilhelm II personally awarded Hugenberg the Order of the Red Eagle for his success at Krupp AG, saying that Germany needed more businessmen like Hugenberg. At the ceremony, Hugenberg praised the Emperor in his acceptance speech and went on to say that democracy would not improve the condition of the German working class, but only a "very much richer, very much greater and very much more powerful Germany" would solve its problems. After the Social Democrats won the largest number of seats in the Reichstag in the 1912 elections, Hugenberg first became interested in the media. He believed that centre-right and right-wing parties such as the National Liberals and the Conservatives needed more newspapers to champion their views.

== World War I ==
=== Annexationist beliefs ===
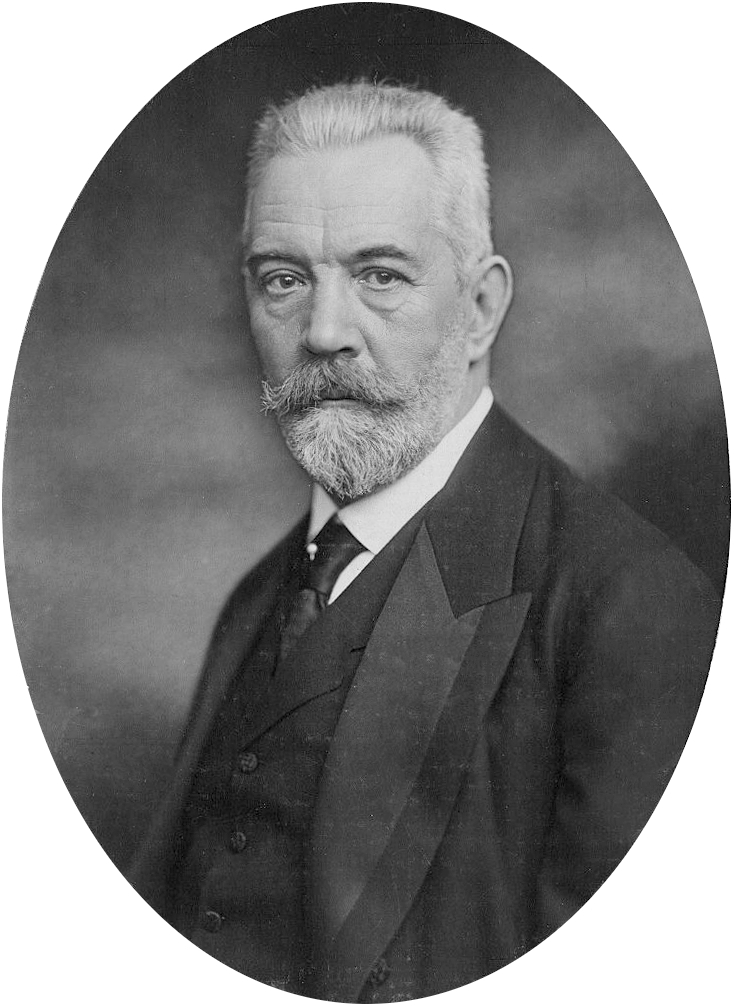
Chancellor Theobald von Bethmann-Hollweg in 1913

As well as administering Krupp's finances with considerable success, Hugenberg also set about developing personal business interests from 1916 onwards, including a controlling interest in the national newsmagazine Die Gartenlaube (The Garden Arbor). In 1914, Hugenberg welcomed the onset of the First World War and resumed his work with his close friend Heinrich Class of the Pan-German League. During the war, Hugenberg was an annexationist who wanted the war to end with Germany annexing portions of Europe, Africa and Asia to make the German Reich into the world's greatest power. In September 1914, Hugenberg and Class co-wrote a memorandum setting out the annexationist platform, which demanded that, once the war was won, Germany would annex Belgium and northern France, British sea power would end, and Russia would be reduced to the "frontiers existing at the time of Peter the Great". Beyond that, Germany was to annex all of the British, French and Belgian colonies in sub-Saharan Africa and create an "economic union" embracing Germany, France, Austria-Hungary, Italy, the Scandinavian nations and the nations of the Balkans, which would be dominated by the Reich. Finally, the Hugenberg–Class memo called for a policy of colonization in Eastern Europe, where the German state would settle thousands of German farmers in the land annexed from the Russian Empire. On 7 November 1914, Hugenberg and Class presented their memo before the Central Association of German Industrialists, the Union of Industrialists and the League of German Farmers to ask for their support, which was granted, albeit with the request that Hugenberg and Class rewrite their memo to remove some of the blunter social Darwinist language.

The chancellor, Theobald von Bethmann Hollweg, was initially an annexationist himself but refused to support the annexationists in public. Under the Constitution of 1871, the Reichstag had limited powers, one of which was the right to pass budgets. In the 1912 elections, the Social Democrats won more seats in the Reichstag than any other party. In 1914, they split into two factions, with the Independent Social Democrats opposing the war and the Majority Social Democrats supporting the war on the grounds that Russia was supposedly about to attack Germany. However, the majority of Social Democrats were opposed to the annexationists, and to secure their cooperation in passing budgets, Bethmann Hollweg refused to support the annexationists in public. Bethmann Hollweg's Septemberprogramm – drafted in September 1914 at a time when the fall of Paris was believed to be imminent, as the German armies had almost reached the French capital, and to be issued when Paris fell – was remarkably similar to the Hugenberg–Class memo.

Aside from his membership in the Pan-German League, Hugenberg had a more personal reason for being an annexationist. Together with his industrialist friends Emil Kirdorf, Hugo Stinnes and Wilhelm Beukenberg, Hugenberg in 1916–1917 founded a number of corporations to exploit the occupied parts of Belgium and northern France. These companies were favoured by the Army, which ruled occupied Belgium and France. Field Marshal Paul von Hindenburg and General Erich Ludendorff – both firm annexationists – appreciated Hugenberg's willingness to spend millions of marks to mobilise public support for their cause. In 1918, after the Treaty of Brest-Litovsk, Hugenberg founded two corporations, the Landgesellschaft Kurland m.b.h and Neuland AG, which had a combined budget of 37 million marks, to establish cooperative funds that would make loans to the hundreds of thousands of German farmers that he expected to soon be settled in Eastern Europe. After Germany's defeat in 1918 put an end to the plans to settle German farmers in the Lebensraum (biotope) of Eastern Europe, Hugenberg used the money that had been allocated to the colonization schemes in Eastern Europe to buy up newspapers.

=== Beginnings of media empire ===
Believing that Bethmann Hollweg was not one of them, Hugenberg, like the rest of the annexationists, spent the years 1914 to 1917 attacking him as essentially a traitor. In 1915, Hugenberg published a telegram to Class in the name of the united chambers of commerce of the Ruhr, demanding that Wilhelm II dismiss Bethmann Hollweg and if the emperor was unwilling, that the military should depose Bethmann Hollweg, stating that if the Reich failed to achieve the annexationist platform once the war was won, it would cause a revolution from the right that would end the monarchy. It was Hugenberg's interest in mobilizing support for the annexationists and bringing down Bethmann Hollweg that led him into the media, as Hugenberg in 1916 started to buy newspapers and publishing houses in order to create more organs for the expression of his imperialistic views. Hugenberg was secretly assisted by the state in his efforts to build a media empire, all the more so as the state distrusted the liberal newspapers owned by the Ullstein brothers and by Rudolf Mosse, all of whom were Jewish, leading the state to request that a circle of "patriotic" businessmen lend Hugenberg the necessary funds to buy up newspapers. The most important of Hugenberg's allies in lending him the money were various members of the Krupp family.

After buying the Scherl newspaper chain in July 1916, Hugenberg announced, at the first meeting of the board under his management, that he had only bought the Scherl corporation to champion annexationist and Pan-German war aims, and that any editors opposed to his expansionist views should resign immediately, before he fired them. In buying the Scherl corporation, Hugenberg acquired the Berlin newspaper Der Tag (The Day), which became the flagship paper of his media empire. Der Tag had a daily circulation of 18,000–20,000 when Hugenberg brought Scherl in 1916, and was a "quality" paper mostly read by educated middle-class people. Another Scherl newspaper was the Berliner Lokal-Anzeiger, a paper aimed at lower-middle class readership that had a daily circulation of a quarter of a million; Der Tag was the more prestigious newspaper, but the Lokal-Anzeiger was the more profitable one. Hugenberg's biographer, John Leopold, wrote: "This very visible success of the Scherl concern led to the charge that Hugenberg was a war profiteer and an unscrupulous manipulator of the postwar inflation. This was undoubtedly true. During the period from 1914 through 1924, Hugenberg had securely established the basis of his entire syndicate. His business transactions were filled with plans to buy and sell shares of different companies, the creation of new corporations as holding concerns to take various firms, contracts with confidants acting as middlemen, and ever-present schemes to avoid taxes. Hugenberg exploited the corporate law, which he knew so well, and used his own financial acumen, which had been so finely developed, to secure his empire. He knew the rules of the game and manipulated them to full advantage."

=== Post-war disillusionment ===
Hugenberg remained at Krupp until 1918, when he set out to build his own business, and during the Great Depression he was able to buy up dozens of local newspapers. Hugenberg's increasing involvement in Pan-German and annexationist causes, together with his interest in building a media empire, caused him to depart from Krupp, which he found to be a distraction from what really interested him. These newspapers became the basis of his publishing firm, Scherl House, and, after he added controlling interests in Universum Film AG (UFA), Ala-Anzeiger AG, Vera Verlag and the Telegraphen Union, he had a near-monopoly on the German media, which he used to agitate for opposition to the Weimar Republic amongst Germany's middle classes. Despite his media empire, Hugenberg detested intellectuals and avoided their company as much as possible. A workaholic, Hugenberg rarely went to the cinema or the theatre, and he spent most of his free time at either his mansion in Dahlem (the most expensive district in Berlin) or his estate at Rohbraken. His only vacations were to visit the spa at Bad Kissingen once every year to treat his obesity and to visit his friend Leo Wegener in Kreuth in Bavaria about twice every year. In the words of his biographer, Hugenberg lived "[...] the life of a stolid burgher surrounded by business associates, family and friends who reinforced his basic ideas".

For Hugenberg, the great trauma of his life was Germany's defeat in World War I, which he blamed on the November Revolution, the "stab-in-the-back" that was alleged to have defeated the Reich just when it was alleged to be on the verge of victory. Hugenberg was always convinced that Germany would recover from the defeat of 1918, all the more so as he believed the German military had not actually been defeated in 1918. In his viewpoint, because it was the "stab-in-the-back" that caused the defeat, all that was necessary was merely to remove the "traitors" from the scene to win the next world war that he expected to occur sometime in the near future. In Hugenberg's viewpoint, just as the Thirty Years' War was followed by the rise of Brandenburg/Prussia, and the crushing defeat of Prussia by Napoleon in 1806 was followed by the War of Liberation in 1813–1814, so too would the Prussian-German state rise again to emerge victorious over its enemies. Hugenberg's devotion to the "social Darwinist and Nietzschean philosophies", with their emphasis on the power of willpower that he had embraced in the late 19th century, further reinforced his commitment to doing his part in bringing about the revival of Germany.

== Nationalist leader ==
=== German National People's Party ===
Logo of the German National People's Party (DNVP)

Hugenberg was one of a number of Pan-Germans to become involved in the National Liberal Party in the run-up to the World War I. During the war, his views shifted sharply to the right. Accordingly, he switched his allegiance to the Fatherland Party and became one of its leading members, emphasizing territorial expansion and anti-Semitism as his two main political issues. In 1919 Hugenberg followed most of the Fatherland Party into the German National People's Party (Deutschnationale Volkspartei, DNVP), which he represented in the Weimar National Assembly, which wrote the 1919 Constitution of the Weimar Republic. He was elected to the Reichstag in the 1920 elections to the new body. Hugenberg defined his interests as finding a "cure for the sick and crazy climate" of the Weimar Republic, which for him was "power and the use of power". Influenced by Otto von Bismarck and Wilhelm II, Hugenberg believed in Sammlungspolitik ("the politics of rallying together") to create a broad national opposition to the Weimar Republic and to hold together the DNVP, which had strong fissiparous tendencies.

Unable to find positive goals that were capable of holding the DNVP together, let alone of creating the sort of national unity that he wanted, Hugenberg came to define his Sammlungspolitik in negative terms by seeking to find "enemies" to provide a unity in hatred. In his first speech before the Reichstag, Hugenberg called the Finance Minister, Matthias Erzberger, a "traitor" for having signed the Armistice of 1918, and claimed his policies as Finance minister were meant to bind the Reich to "international economic slavery". To create the desired rallying together, Hugenberg supported what was known at the time as Katastrophenpolitik (catastrophe politics), believing that the worse things were, the sooner the Weimar Republic would end. After speaking in 1919, Hugenberg would not give a speech again in the Reichstag until 1929, and he rarely spoke at meetings of the Reich Association of German Industry; however, his ability to donate millions of marks to his favoured causes made him an important figure within the DNVP. Hugenberg was a poor speaker and devoid of charm. Those who knew well stated he was "not a man, but a wall" owing to his extreme obstinacy, as he loathed any sort of compromise, and it was often stated he was "not an easy man" to deal with.

=== Growth of media empire ===
In 1920, Hugenberg founded a populist tabloid, the Berliner Illustrierte Nachtausgabe, which became his most profitable newspaper, having a daily circulation of 216,000 by 1929. The most important of Hugenberg's media properties were the Telegraphen-Union, which he founded in 1921 by buying and merging the Dammert Verlag GmbH, the Deutscher Handelsdienst and the Westdeutscher Handelsdienst. The Telegraphen-Union (TU) played a role in the German media analogous to Reuters's in the United Kingdom and the Associated Press in the United States, employing some 250 journalists in thirty offices around the world to report on national and international news for smaller newspapers in Germany that could not afford national and international correspondents. At the height of its influence, some 1,600 newspapers in Germany subscribed to the Telegraphen-Union, making it an effective competitor to the Telegraph Bureau, owned by the liberal and Jewish journalist Theodor Wolff. Hugenberg had founded the TU to compete with the Telegraph Bureau following complaints from German conservatives of "liberal bias" at the Wolff-owned Telegraph Bureau. Though the Telegraphen-Union was described as "non-partisan", its coverage of both national and foreign news tended to be very sympathetic towards right-wing political parties opposed to the Weimar Republic. The Hugenberg papers constantly hammered home the message that the Weimar Republic was born of the "stab-in-the-back", and its leaders were the "November criminals". Those who endorsed such views were always described as "the experts" while those opposed were "partisan politicians", creating the impression that the belief in the "stab-in-the-back" was the objective truth, while those opposed were people subjectively pursuing their own agenda. To reinforce the point, the Hugenberg papers blamed every conceivable problem in Germany on the defeat of 1918 while painting a counter-factual picture of the Empire being a utopia had the war ended in victory in 1918.

In cities such as Berlin, the Hugenberg newspapers had to compete with the liberal newspapers owned by the Ullstein and Mosse families, and the Hugenberg media empire was most influential in the small towns and rural areas of Germany, where the newspapers owned by Hugenberg were most people's main source of news. Even in areas where Hugenberg did not own the newspapers, the local newspapers were dependent upon the Hugenberg-owned Telegraphen-Union for news outside of their areas; about 600 newspapers in the rural areas and small towns of Germany exclusively reprinted articles written by TU journalists for their national and international news. During the Weimar Republic, Germany had about 3,000 newspapers, of which only 14 were owned by Hugenberg. It was via the TU that some 1,600 newspapers, mostly in rural areas and small towns, used for national and international news, that Hugenberg had influence.

Although Hugenberg was often described as representing the interests of the industrialists, John Leopold wrote: "His nationalist insistence on autarchy and his diametrical opposition to all forms of unionism represented not the attitude of most businessmen, but the ideology of the Pan-German League. No longer concerned with the profits and losses of any industry other than his media empire, Hugenberg was free to criticize the immediate demands of industrialists for practical solutions and he reverted to the simplistic solutions espoused by the Pan-Germans since the prewar era". Hugenberg's social Darwinist views remained unchanged as he argued that the "survival of the fittest" should become "the life principle of development", a stance that put him at odds with the leaders of the left wing of the DNVP such as Hans Schlange-Schöningen, Gottfried Treviranus, Walther Lambach, and Gustav Hülser, men who shared his vehement opposition to Marxism, but were opposed to his harsh social Darwinism. Amongst the DNVP Reichstag members whom Hugenberg associated with were General Wilhelm von Dommes, the emissary for the emperor in exile; Admiral Alfred von Tirpitz; Carl Gottfried Gok, a Pan-German leader; and Theodor Duesterberg of Der Stahlhelm. Hugenberg founded a thinktank, the Wirtschaftsvereiningung zur Förderung der geistigen Wiederaufbaukräfte (the Economic Association for the Promotion of Intellectual Forces of Reconstruction) to promote his ideas, while he lived a pseudo-aristocratic lifestyle at his estate at Rohbraken. In 1922, together with the industrialist Emil Kirdorf, Hugenberg created an investment fund known as Webegemeinschaft that served to subsidize groups "very effective politically, but not commercially profitable". Hugenberg was the chairman of the fund, which started out with 600,000 marks and averaged a quarter of million marks in subsidies to any group that Hugenberg and Kirdorf approved of.

=== Opposition to reparations ===
In January 1923, when Germany defaulted on its reparations to France, the French premier Raymond Poincaré ordered the occupation of the Ruhr, marking the beginning of "passive resistance" that led to hyperinflation. As a supporter of Katastrophenpolitik, Hugenberg welcomed the inflation as the beginning of the end of the Weimar Republic, arguing that the economic disaster would awaken the furor teutonicus that would lead to the "Third Reich". In an essay he wrote at the time, he stated that what Germany needed was a leader who had the charisma to "attract the masses behind him like the Pied Piper of Hamelin [...] Only a few will and can do this. We, the entire spectrum of non-socialists, can do no more than prepare the way for these few. Hopefully we will find that which we desire." In this spirit, Hugenberg declared one could "not be radical enough". It was during the crisis year of 1923 that Admiral Alfred von Tirpitz suggested that Hugenberg should pursue the chancellorship because there was no other "personality in Germany who would be so suited to bring the "expeditious" understanding necessary for the salvation of our country and so suitable for the situation". The decision by Gustav Stresemann of the German People's Party, until then considered a part of the "national opposition", to accept the chancellorship and to end the passive resistance in September 1923 was condemned by Hugenberg as a betrayal. Stresemann became a Vernunftrepublikaner ("republican by reason" – someone who was still loyal to the monarchy in his heart, but accepted the republic as the least bad alternative), and insofar as his policies aimed at economic and political stability, he became the subject of immense hatred from Hugenberg.

In November 1923, when the Nazis launched the Beer Hall Putsch in Munich, they received significant coverage in the Hugenberg newspapers for the first time. Adolf Hitler and the other Nazi leaders were portrayed as well-meaning but misguided patriots who were trying to end the Weimar Republic in the wrong way. In an editorial in the Hugenberg-owned München-Augsburger Abendzeitung newspaper, Hitler was praised as an "exceptionally popular speaker" who had "liberated" the minds of "innumerable workers from international socialism", but the putsch was condemned on the grounds that "You must gather together and not scatter! You must bind together and not tear apart!"

To end the hyperinflation of 1923, a new currency, the Reichsmark was created to replace the worthless Papiermark, reparation payments were lowered through the Dawes Plan, and a huge loan to Germany was floated in New York. The American bankers insisted that the state-owned Deutsche Reichsbahn railroad be put up as a collateral for the loan, which in turn required amending the constitution with a two-thirds majority vote in the Reichstag. As the DNVP did well in the elections of May 1924, to amend the constitution would require the votes of the DNVP Reichstag members, which split the party into two. The industrialists who supported the DNVP were in favour of the Dawes plan and threatened to cut off funding for the party forever if it voted against the Dawes Plan, while another faction still attached to Katastrophenpolitik favoured rejecting the Dawes Plan on the grounds that a return to the economic chaos of 1923 was the best way of ending the Weimar Republic. Hugenberg emerged as one of the leaders of the latter faction that wanted to reject the Dawes Plan, writing bitterly at the time that "two-thirds of the German people including those behind the German National People's Party are internally prepared to let the freedom, honor and future of their land be sold in exchange for a few pieces of silver". When the vote occurred on 27 August 1924, 49 DNVP Reichstag members voted for the Dawes Plan while 48 voted against; Hugenberg missed the vote with a doctor's note saying he was too unwell to attend the Reichstag that day.

Since the DNVP agreed to support the government of Hans Luther, Hugenberg grew more embittered, writing a series of essays in February–March 1925, later published as a book, that included such lines as "it stinks in the German Reich" and the "false leaders belong in the asylums". In the 1925 presidential election, the Hugenberg newspapers supported Paul von Hindenburg for president, despite Hugenberg's private reservations, as he believed Hindenburg as president would give the Republic more legitimacy. Hugenberg's principle fear was that the DNVP under the leadership of Kuno von Westarp was moving in a "Tory" direction, by which he meant that it was starting to become a "big tent" conservative party like the British Conservative Party that combined different interest groups and as a result was toning down its ideology in a favour of pragmatic approach to power.

=== Putsch discussions with Heinrich Class ===
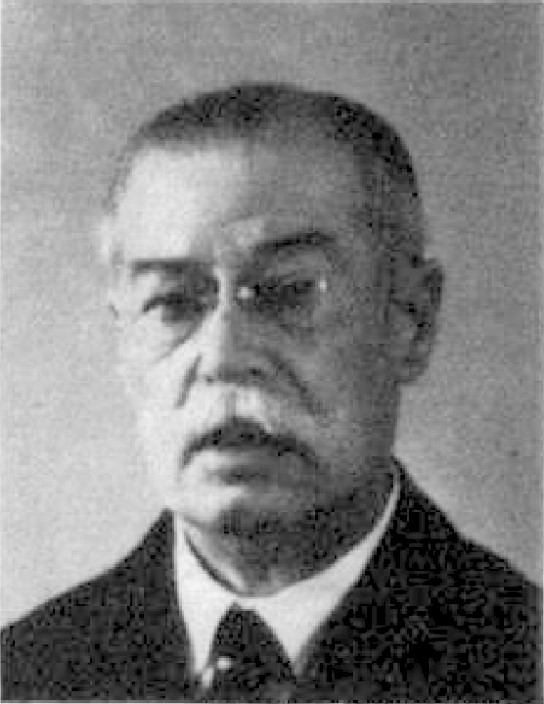
Heinrich Class, whose plans for a putsch included Hugenberg

In January 1926, Hugenberg was involved in a plan for a putsch organised by his good friend, Heinrich Class, calling for President Hindenburg to appoint as chancellor someone unacceptable for the Reichstag, which would lead to a motion of no confidence. Hindenburg would respond by dissolving the Reichstag and resigning while the election campaign was in progress; the Chancellor would become acting president, and Class planned to have him issue a declaration of martial law and become the "Reich Regent". Class planned to have Hugenberg serve as minister of finance in the new government. The Social Democrats controlled Prussia, and the Prussian police arrested those involved in Class's scheme. None of the accused was brought to trial except Class, and the judge dismissed the charges because of a lack of evidence, stating that merely talking about a putsch was not the same thing as planning a putsch. The charges brought Hugenberg much attention, and the spokesman for the Hugenberg press, Ludwig Bernhard, used the case to praise Hugenberg as a great German patriot who had used his fortune to buy up newspapers to protect the German press from the "alien" Ullstein and Mosse families. Bernhard noted that the Mosse and Ullstein families were Jewish, while Hugenberg was not.

Bernhard's pamphlet first made Hugenberg well known. It was during this period that Hugenberg's friends such as Class and Leo Wegener started to promote Hugenberg and his business empire as a sort of brand despite his manifest lack of charm, proudly adopting the label "Hugenberg press" to describe his media empire, and gave him the image of a corporate superhero leader who could save Germany. The fact that Hugenberg rarely spoke in public during this period aided their efforts, giving him an aura of mystery. As the DNVP took part in several coalitions, Hugenberg emerged as one of the leading critics within the party of the approach of the party's leader, Kuno von Westarp, charging that he was betraying the party's principles. In 1927, the Scherl press published Hugenberg's essays of 1925 as Streiflichter aus Vergangenheit und Gegenwart (Highlights from Past and Present), in which he attacked the policies associated with Westarp and implicitly challenged his competence to be the DNVP's leader. In March 1927, Hugenberg purchased UFA, Europe's largest film studio, which brought him further attention. Hugenberg presented the purchase of UFA as a political move instead of a business move. The Hugenberg newspapers loudly announced that UFA had been brought to prevent "republicans, Jews and internationalists" from making any more films at UFA.

== Leader of the DNVP ==
=== Ousting of Westarp as party chairman ===
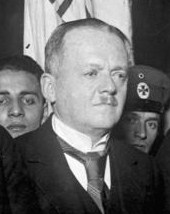
Kuno von Westarp, chairman of the DNVP before Hugenberg

The DNVP suffered heavy losses in the 1928 election, leading to the appointment of Hugenberg as sole chairman on 21 October that same year. Hugenberg moved the party in a far more radical direction than it had taken under its previous leader, Kuno Graf von Westarp. After the 1928 election, a DNVP Reichstag member, Walther Lambach, published an article in the journal Politische Wochenschrift, saying that the poor showing of the DNVP in the election was due to its monarchism. Lambach argued that the vast majority of the German people did not pine for the return of the exiled Emperor, and the party's emphasis on this point was alienating the public, which had come to accept the Republic. Lambach ended his article by writing that the DNVP needed a Volkskonservatismus (popular conservatism) that addressed the concerns of ordinary Germans and that restoring the monarchy was not one of them.

Hugenberg was the leader of the DNVP monarchist purists for whom no changes in the party's platform were acceptable, and he started to press for the DNVP to expel Lambach as a way of bringing down Westarp, who only agreed to censure Lambach for his article. At Hugenberg's instigation, the Potsdam branch of the DNVP expelled Lambach on its own in July 1928, presenting Westarp with a fait accompli, which showed the way the party's grassroots members felt about the Lambach affair. Hugenberg followed up this triumph with an article saying that the DNVP was "not a parliamentary party in the proper sense of the word, but a grand group of men – a community of opinion, not a community of interests", which in his view had caused the DNVP to degenerate from its core principles, of which Lambach's article was only the most deplorable and recent example. Hugenberg argued that the DNVP could not change its values, writing: "Only an ideological party which is led and which leads can save the soul and economy of the German people!" Using Lambach as a surrogate for his attack on Westarp, Hugenberg argued that the DNVP could not be a brei ("mishmash") of people of different values such as monarchists and republicans, and could only be led by a "strong" leader fanatically devoted to upholding the party's values, who would lead in an authoritarian style, by which he clearly meant himself. Lambach appealed against his expulsion and was allowed back into the DNVP, arguing that he himself was still a monarchist and his article was intended only to spark discussion.

However, the Lambach case had galvanised the DNVP's membership against Westarp and for Hugenberg, who knew that the DNVP would be calling a party congress later that year that would have the power to elect a new leader, and that the Lambach affair was a godsend. Using the Lambach case as his rallying cry, Hugenberg campaigned aggressively amongst the party's membership, greatly helped by the fact that the Pan-German League had taken over many of the DNVP's local branches. When the party congress opened on 20 October 1928, Westarp was on the defensive right from the start as he was forced to apologize for the DNVP's poor showing in the most recent election, and he appealed to the delegates themselves for ideas about improving the party's image, making him look like a weak leader. By contrast, Hugenberg – who, while lacking in charm and charisma – was able to present himself as a man with a definite plan to restore the party's fortunes. The fact that the members of the Pan-German League were overrepresented at the party congress further favoured Hugenberg, who was elected the DNVP's new leader on 21 October 1928. As part of his campaign against Westarp, Hugenberg stressed his success as a businessman, but at the same time, he also stressed that he was so wealthy that he was independent of big business and could follow his own line. Hugenberg gave the impression that the DNVP would not need any more donations from big business, as he was so wealthy that he would fund the DNVP entirely out of his own pocket.

=== Nationalism and the Führerprinzip ===
He hoped to use radical nationalism to restore the party's fortunes and eventually to overthrow the Weimar constitution and install an authoritarian form of government. Up to this point, right-wing politics outside of the far right were going through a process of reconciliation with the Weimar Republic, but this ended under Hugenberg, who renewed earlier DNVP calls for its immediate destruction. Under his direction, a new DNVP manifesto appeared in 1931, demonstrating the shift to the right. Amongst its demands were immediate restoration of the Hohenzollern monarchy, a reversal of the terms of the Treaty of Versailles, compulsory military conscription, repossession of the German colonial empire, a concerted effort to build up closer links with German speaking people outside Germany (especially in Austria), a dilution of the role of the Reichstag to that of a supervisory body, a newly established professional house of appointees reminiscent of Benito Mussolini's corporative state, and reduction in the perceived over-representation of Jews in German public life.

Hugenberg also sought to eliminate internal party democracy and instill a Führerprinzip within the DNVP, leading to some members breaking away to establish the Conservative People's Party (KVP) in late 1929. More were to follow in June 1930, appalled by Hugenberg's extreme opposition to the cabinet of Heinrich Brüning, a moderate whom some within the DNVP wanted to support. Despite Hugenberg's background in industry, that constituency gradually deserted the DNVP under his leadership, largely due to a general feeling amongst industrialists that Hugenberg was too inflexible, and soon the party became the main voice of agrarian interests in the Reichstag. Hugenberg's unwillingness to have the DNVP enter the Brüning cabinet greatly embittered the industrialists, who complained that the DNVP under his leadership was a perpetual opposition party, and as a result the largest contributor to the DNVP by 1931 had become Hugenberg himself, which had the effect of cementing his control.

Hugenberg had purchased the UFA studio – the largest film production company in both Germany and Europe – with the aim of making right-wing "national" films, but in this case, his concern for profits overrode his ideology. The transition from silent film to talkies had imposed significant costs on UFA, which chose to mostly produce films designed for the widest possible audience to recoup the costs of installing sound equipment. Between 1930 and 1933, only a limited number of UFA films were the type of "national" films that Hugenberg had envisioned when he brought UFA, and of the "national" films only Flötenkonzert von Sans-souci (1930), Yorck (1931), Im Geheimdienst (1931) and Morgenrot (1933) were successful at the box office. Despite his anti-Semitism, Hugenberg did not fire the many Jews who worked at UFA as directors, script-writers, actors, etc., as he did not want to lose any talent to rival studios.

== The politics of polarization ==
=== Opposition to the Young Plan and work with the Nazis ===
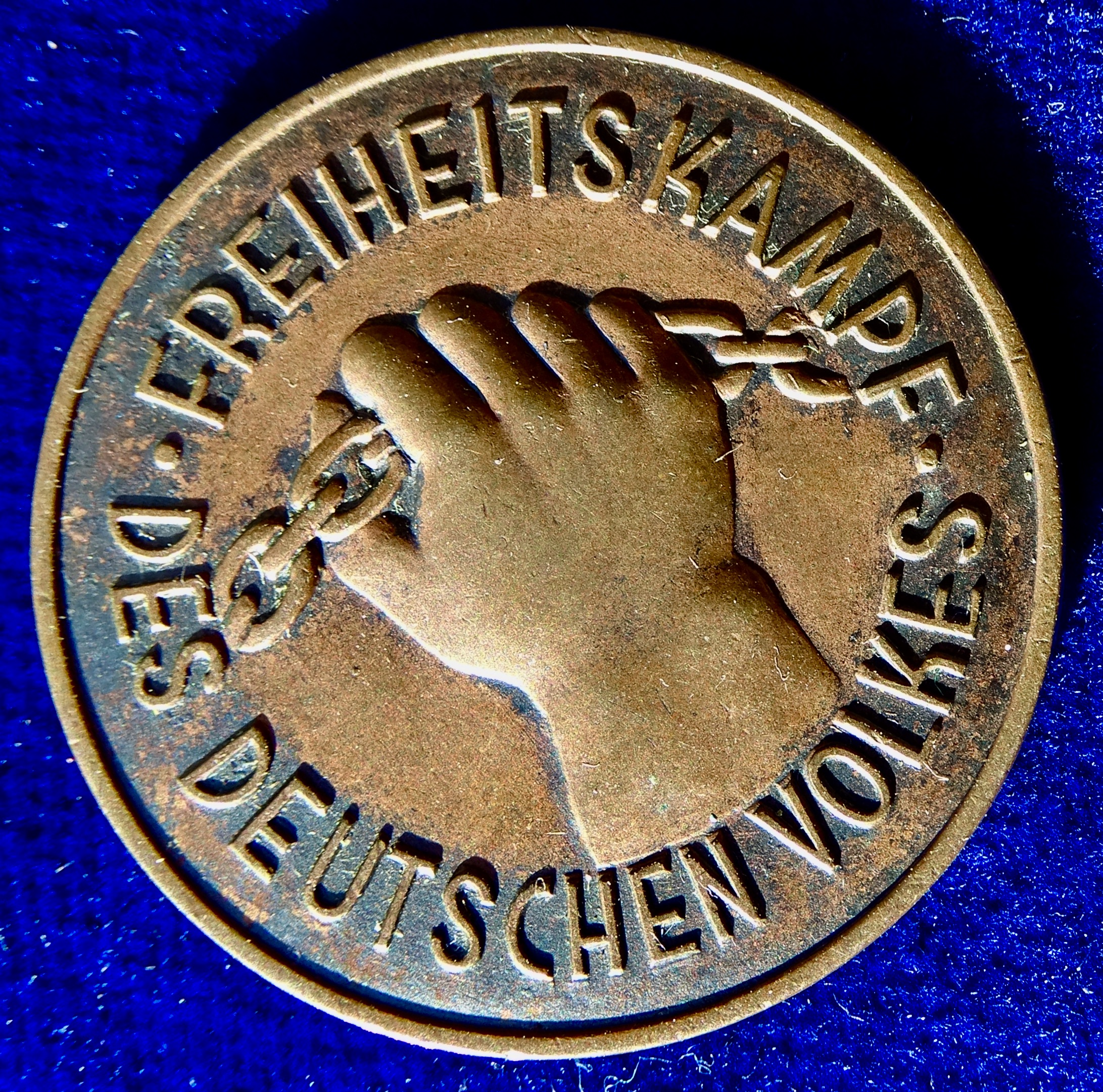
Referendum campaign medal against the Young Plan. The inscription reads "Freedom Fight of the German People".

Hugenberg had a grand strategy to bring down "the System" as enemies of the Weimar Republic always called it. Hugenberg believed in the politics of polarization under which German politics were to be divided into two blocs, the right-wing "national" bloc whose leader he envisioned as himself and the Marxist left consisting of the Social Democrats and the Communists. As part of his strategy of polarization, Hugenberg intended to seize upon wedge issues and present them in a highly inflammatory manner to create a situation where one could be either for or against the "national" bloc, which was intended to lead to the electoral decline of all centrist parties in Germany. Leopold noted that Hugenberg "debated political issues in terms of a simplistic, philosophic disjunction – a man was either for the nation or he was against it". Hugenberg wrote in 1929 in a memo outlining his planned politics of polarization that "fate is only for the weak and the sick. The strong, healthy man molds his fate and that of his nation with his own will." Hugenberg believed that the same skills that made a successful media magnate would bring down the Weimar Republic as he deliberately pursued his strategy of Sammlung (rallying together) as he called his polarizing strategy. As a part of this polarization, he planned to turn the DNVP from a party working within the Reichstag to advance its goals – which was what the DNVP had more or less become under Westarp – into a movement that would work for the destruction of "the System". Hugenberg had initially intended as his wedge issue the subject of constitutional reform, but he dropped it in the spring of 1929 as "too abstract" for most people in favour of opposing the Young Plan for reparations.

Taking advantage of a clause in the Weimar constitution that allowed a referendum to be called if enough people signed a petition demanding it, Hugenberg decided in June 1929 to collect signatures for a referendum on the Young Plan, which was intended to discredit the "grand coalition" government led by the Social Democratic chancellor Hermann Müller. Using highly emotional, visceral language, Hugenberg and his newspapers presented the Young Plan – which actually reduced reparations – in the starkest terms possible as a form of "financial slavery" for "our children's children" which would reduce living standards in Germany down to an "Asiatic" level of poverty (at the time, the term "Asiatic" poverty referred to what today would be called a Third World living standard). By pushing for a referendum on the Young Plan, Hugenberg as intended forced the Müller "grand coalition" government to defend the Young Plan while Hugenberg as an opposition leader felt free to make extravagant promises about what he would do if he was chancellor, claiming that the Reich would pay no reparations at all if he were in charge. Even at the time, it was widely recognized that Hugenberg's status as an opposition leader free from the burdens of office allowed him the luxury of not suggesting a "realistic alternative" to the Young Plan. This was especially the case as the French government had agreed that in exchange for German acceptance of the Young Plan, France would end its occupation of the Rhineland in the summer of 1930, which was five years earlier than the Treaty of Versailles had called for. At the time, Hugenberg's critics pointed out that if the Young Plan was rejected, then the French occupation of the Rhineland would continue until the summer of 1935, an aspect of Hugenberg's rejectionist strategy that he never dwelled on. Hugenberg's strategy was a negative one intended to create the "national bloc" that he envisioned meant there could be little discussion of what the "national bloc" intended to achieve, since there were too many divisions on the German right for a positive program, and instead the "national bloc" was to be united by what it was against instead of what it was for.

Hugenberg was vehemently opposed to the Young Plan, and he set up a "Reich Committee for the German People's Petition" to oppose it, featuring the likes of Franz Seldte, Heinrich Class, Theodor Duesterberg and Fritz Thyssen. On 9 July 1929, Hugenberg founded the Reich Committee on the German Initiative to campaign against the Young Plan, which the Hugenberg newspapers hailed as the most important political development. Hugenberg saw the referendum as the beginning of the counterrevolution, writing at the time that thanks to him "a front has arisen that knows only one goal: how the revolution [of 1918] can be overcome and a nation of free men can again be made from Germans". To achieve this goal, Hugenberg took 551,000 Reichsmarks from the Scherl corporation for discretionary spending and another 400,000 for "special purposes", all of which he spent on the referendum. However, he recognized that the DNVP and their elite band of allies did not have enough popular support to carry a rejection of the scheme through. As such, Hugenberg felt that he needed a nationalist with support amongst the working classes whom he could use to whip up popular sentiment against the Plan. Adolf Hitler was the only realistic candidate, and Hugenberg decided that he would use the Nazi Party leader to get his way. As a result, the Nazi Party soon became the recipients of Hugenberg's largesse, both in terms of monetary donations and of favourable coverage from the Hugenberg-owned press, which had previously largely ignored Hitler or denounced him as a socialist. Joseph Goebbels, who had a deep hatred of Hugenberg, initially spoke privately of breaking away from Hitler over the alliance, but he changed his mind when Hugenberg agreed that Goebbels should handle the propaganda for the campaign, giving the Nazi Party access to Hugenberg's media empire.

The infamous paragraph four in the proposed "Law Against the Enslavement of the German People" (more commonly known as the "Freedom Law") – as the proposed anti-Young Plan bill to be submitted in the referendum was called – stipulating that those Reichstag members who voted for the Young Plan and those civil servants who handed over reparations were to be imprisoned, was inserted by Hitler and accepted by Hugenberg, who believed it would attract voters. Paragraph four of the "Freedom Law" instead divided the DNVP. Westarp and several other DNVP Reichstag members came out in opposition, arguing that paragraph four was going too far, while the Reich Association of German Industry declared its neutrality, despite Hugenberg's efforts to have the association support him. Several industrialists such as Albert Vögler and Fritz Thyssen supported the "Freedom Law", but the majority were opposed, favouring the Young Plan since it promised economic stability; rather than risk a split, the association declared itself neutral at a meeting on 20 September 1929. On 24 September 1929, at a gigantic rally in the Berlin Sports Palace, the four leaders of the Reich Committee against the Enslavement of the German People, namely Hugenberg, Hitler, Seldte and Class, formally began the campaign for the "Law Against the Enslavement of the German People". On 30 November 1929, when the "Freedom Law" came up before the Reichstag, 14 DNVP representatives abstained from voting while 3 voted against the "Freedom Law", citing concerns about paragraph four. When Hugenberg tried to impose party discipline, 12 DNVP representatives left the party in protest over his leadership. The Hugenberg newspapers went all-out in support of the "Freedom Law", running glaring headlines in support, but when the referendum was held, only 5,538,000 Germans voted yes for the "Freedom Law", which was insufficient to for the law to pass.

=== Leadership failures ===
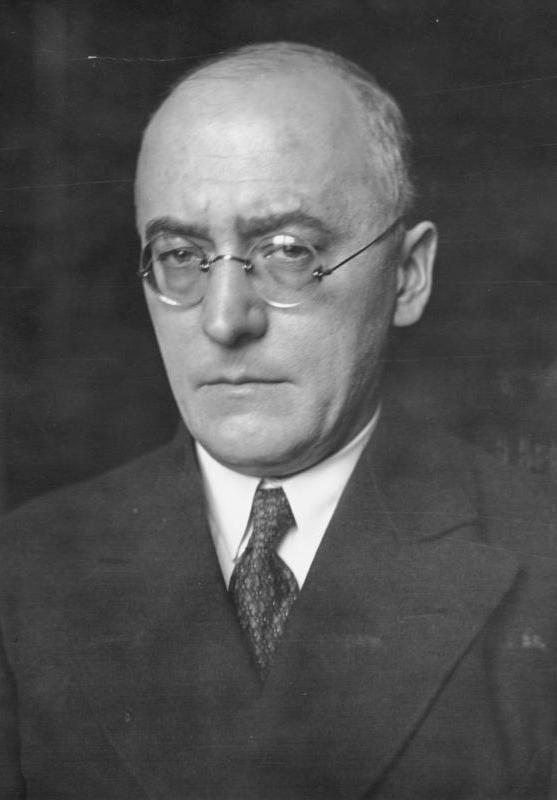
Chancellor Heinrich Brüning, who attempted unsuccessfully to have Hugenberg join his cabinet.

Hitler was able to use Hugenberg to push himself into the political mainstream, and once the Young Plan was passed by the Reichstag, Hitler promptly ended his links with Hugenberg. Leopold noted that Hugenberg's polarizing strategy to divide Germany into two blocs had, starting with the Young Plan referendum, worked successfully, but the man who benefited was not Hugenberg as intended, but rather Hitler. Hitler publicly blamed Hugenberg for the failure of the campaign, but he retained the links with big business that the committee had allowed him to cultivate, and this began a process of the business magnates deserting the DNVP for the Nazis. Hitler's handling of the affair was marred by one thing, and that was the premature announcement in the Nazi press of his repudiation of the alliance with the Strasser brothers, whose left-wing economics were incompatible with Hugenberg's arch-capitalism. On 6 January 1930, Hugenberg was summoned to meet President Paul von Hindenburg, who told him that now the Young Plan had been passed, he had no more need for Müller, and he was planning to bring in a new presidential government very soon that would be "anti-parliamentary and anti-Marxist". Hindenburg explained the intention behind the presidential government, which would be based on the "25/48/53 formula" (a reference to the articles in the constitution that made such a government possible), was to gradually end democracy, and he wanted Hugenberg to be a cabinet minister in the new government. Much to Hindenburg's vexation, Hugenberg refused to take part, maintaining that he would not be a cabinet minister in a government that paid reparations.

In an attempt to induce Hugenberg to support the new presidential government of Heinrich Brüning, a bill was introduced to increase taxes while also increasing government aid to farmers, one of the key groups that voted for the DNVP. The promise of more aid to farmers was popular in rural areas, and several DNVP representatives, led by Westarp, wanted the party to vote for the bill, which Hugenberg was opposed to on the grounds that some of the tax revenue raised would go to France in the form of reparations. On the first reading of the bill on 12 April 1930, the DNVP split with 31 representatives voting for, while 23 led by Hugenberg voted against; on the second reading on 14 April 32 DNVP representatives voted for the bill while 20 voted against. That Hugenberg was incapable of controlling his own Reichstag delegation led Hitler to openly mock him as a weak leader. When the bill was enacted under Article 48 (that is, by presidential decree), Hugenberg ordered the DNVP representatives to vote to cancel the bill on 18 July 1930; 25 DNVP representatives led by Westarp broke with party discipline to vote for the bill and left the party in protest. Bills passed under Article 48 could be cancelled by the Reichstag, but Brüning threatened to have Hindenburg use Article 53 to dissolve the Reichstag for a new election if his bill should be cancelled. As a consequence, Hindenburg dissolved the Reichstag for an election only two years into its mandate. During the 1930 election campaign, Hugenberg's shortcomings as a speaker were cruelly exposed. He came across as awkward, arrogant and above all very dull. During the campaign, the Hugenberg press largely concentrated its attacks on "Marxism", warning that the SPD was working for a revolution and wanted to increase spending on the welfare state as the first step towards "Bolshevism". The Nazis by contrast were treated relatively kindly by the Hugenberg papers with a Der Tag editorial saying there were no differences between the DNVP and the NSDAP on "culture and religion, the attitude towards Jewry and the will towards reconstruction in individual social and economic questions". The election ended with the DNVP being reduced to only 41 seats from 73 in the Reichstag, while the Nazis went up from the 12 seats they won in 1928 to 107 seats.

On 26 November 1930, Brüning met with Hugenberg to ask him to join his government, only for Hugenberg – who was still following Katastrophenpolitik – to tell him that he would rather see the "collapse which I predicted", and "I must fight you and the entire system". Despite the way that Hitler now overshadowed him, Hugenberg was convinced that Hitler still owed a debt of some sort which he would have to repay by deferring to him. On 10 February 1931, Hugenberg joined the Nazi Party in walking with the DNVP out of the Reichstag altogether as a protest against the Brüning government. By then, the two parties were in a very loose federation, known as the National Opposition.

By 1930, Hugenberg was spending about 4,600 Reichsmarks per month on the DNVP and another 7,500 RM on special expenses for the party. By 1931, when the Great Depression caused profits in the Hugenberg papers to drop by 30%, Hugenberg became insistent that the DNVP start to become financially self-sufficient instead of depending on him to subsidize the party. Though the Berlin newspapers such as Der Tag and Berliner Nachtausgabe saw circulation decline, they continued to be in the black; by contrast, the provincial newspapers such as the Süddeutsche Zeitung in Stuttgart and München Augsburger Abendzeitung in Munich were losing so much money that in 1931 Hugenberg seriously considered shutting both newspapers down. Despite the anti-Semitic and generally xenophobic line taken by his newspapers, Hugenberg had no hesitations about using the services of a German Jewish banker, Jacob Goldschmidt, to arrange a loan from a group of New York financiers in May 1931 that allowed him to keep his provincial newspapers afloat.

Although President Paul von Hindenburg disliked Hugenberg, his neighbour in East Prussia and a fellow Junker, Elard von Oldenburg-Januschau, was a DNVP member. Through Oldenburg-Januschau, Hugenberg was able to meet Hindenburg on his estate at Neudeck, where the former pressed the latter to appoint him chancellor, saying he was the only man who would "master the situation". However, Hugenberg's hubristic arrogance enraged Hindenburg, who complained that he was a Junker, a field marshal and the president, while Hugenberg treated him "like a schoolboy".

The flagship paper of Hugenberg's media empire, Der Tag, in an editorial praised the Nazi "will to sacrifice" and "courage to battle", but charged that the Nazis were too rash and too ignorant of economics to govern on their own, requiring the DNVP as a coalition partner, since the latter party was the party of "schooled, conservative, constructive, youthfully strong determination". The appeal did not work as intended, and Ludwig Klitzsch, who ran the Scherl press, warned Hugenberg that the friendly coverage of the Nazis had "...frequently exceeded the bounds of political wisdom". The fact that DNVP members did not have to pay dues, as NSDAP members did, proved to be a weakness, as the requirement to pay monthly dues inspired Nazi Party members with far more devotion to their cause than the DNVP members, who blithely assumed that Hugenberg's fortune was more than enough to handle the party's financial needs. In 1931, Hugenberg, whose fortune was not as vast as believed, was forced to cut DNVP's budget by 31% in order to keep the party solvent. Hugenberg's support for high tariffs for agriculture and his call to replace the welfare state with a program of "self-help" for the unemployed offended many in the cities.

== Harzburg Front ==
=== DNVP-Nazi cooperation ===
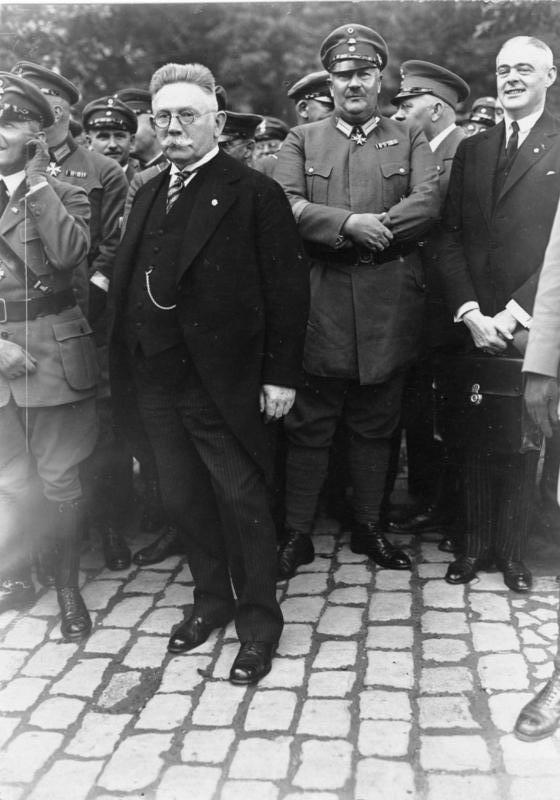
Hugenberg in Bad Harzburg, 1931, with Prince Eitel Friedrich

The collapse of the German banking system in the spring and summer of 1931 was seen by Hugenberg as an opportunity to create the nationalist Sammlung (rallying together) that he had sought with the Young Plan referendum. On 9 July 1931, Hugenberg released a joint statement with Hitler guaranteeing that the pair would cooperate for the overthrow of the Weimar "system". Hugenberg wanted to announce the creation of his front in Bad Harzburg in Braunschweig, a land (state) governed by a DNVP-NSDAP coalition, to symbolize unity on the right. Hitler was wary of the plans, leading Hugenberg to complain in private of his "megalomania, but also of uncontrollability, imprudence and lack of judgement". To show his strength before the joint rally in Bad Harzburg, Hugenberg held the DNVP's party congress in September 1931 in Stettin, which was intentionally modelled after a Nazi rally. The presence at the congress of such figures such as Prince Oskar of Prussia, Admiral Ludwig von Schröder, Field Marshal August von Mackensen and Fritz Thyssen was intended to show that Hugenberg was a militaristic monarchist whose economic policies were supported by big business. At the party congress, Hugenberg blamed the Great Depression on the Treaty of Versailles, the gold standard and a misplaced belief in "international capital". The first part of his solution to the Great Depression was a policy of autarky and protectionism. Ultimately, Hugenberg argued that the solution to the Great Depression was imperialism, as he argued that Germans were a "Volk ohne Raum" ("people without space"), which he felt was the fundamental problem with the German economy. As such, Hugenberg argued that Germany needed the return of its former colonial empire in Africa and to conquer Lebensraum ("living space") in Eastern Europe, which would provide sufficient space for the Germans to colonize and people to exploit. For the Bad Harzburg rally, Hugenberg wanted a broad front that emphasized being respectable. Amongst the people he invited to Bad Harzburg who attended the rally were Crown Prince Wilhelm, Prince Oskar, Prince Eitel Friedrich, Heinrich Class, Count Eberhard von Kalkreuth, Admiral Magnus von Levetzow, Fritz Thyssen, Admiral Adolf von Trotha, General Hans von Seeckt, General Rüdiger von der Goltz, General Karl von Einem, and Hjalmar Schacht.

=== DNVP losses and rise of the Nazis ===
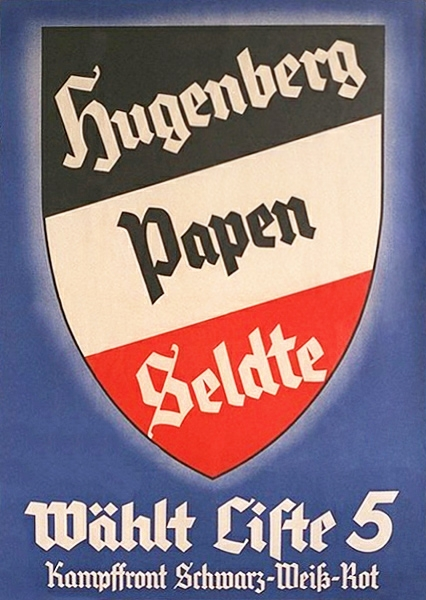
Hugenberg-Papen-Seldte campaign poster: "Vote list 5 / Battle front black-white-red"

Hugenberg and Hitler presented a united front at Bad Harzburg on 21 October 1931 as part of a wider right-wing rally, leading to suggestions that a Harzburg Front involving the two parties and the veterans' organization Der Stahlhelm had emerged. The two leaders soon clashed, and Hugenberg's refusal to endorse Hitler in the 1932 German presidential election widened the gap. Indeed, the rift between the two opened further when Hugenberg, fearing that Hitler might win the presidency, persuaded Theodor Duesterberg to run as a Junker candidate after Prince Oskar of Prussia declined to run as the DNVP candidate. Although Duesterberg was eliminated on the first vote, due largely to Nazi allegations regarding his Jewish parentage, Hitler nonetheless failed to secure the presidency. As Duesterberg won only 6.8% vote of the vote compared to Hitler's 30.1% and Hindenburg's 49.6%, he dropped out of the second round of the presidential election. In desperation, Hugenberg tried to get Crown Prince Wilhelm to run as the DNVP's candidate, only for the exiled emperor to issue a statement saying it was "absolute idiocy" for his son to run for president. More damaging, Crown Prince Wilhelm announced he would not run as the DNVP candidate, and instead endorsed Hitler for president.

Hugenberg's speeches were intensely boring, and his attempt to create a Hitler-style personality cult around himself failed. Hugenberg's mannerisms and his upper-class accent gave him the image of "[...] an arrogant, unapproachable demigod" who knew nothing of the concerns of ordinary people. Hugenberg's cunning in business had earned him the nicknames the "Cross Spider" and the "Silver Fox"; however, as DNVP leader he was widely known as "the Hamster". Hugenberg's rotund build and short stature together with his handlebar mustache, brush-cut hairstyle and the Wilhelmine way of dressing with a high collar made him resemble a hamster, giving him a nickname that he hated; more broadly, the nickname suggested that he was not being taken as seriously as he would have liked. By 1932, Baron Thilo von Wilmowsky, who was married to Barbara von Krupp, the younger sister of Bertha von Krupp and was widely regarded as the spokesman for the Krupp family, was seeking to oust Hugenberg as the DNVP leader, convinced that his utter lack of charisma and charm was leading the party to disaster. A group of Hanoverian industrialists offered 100,000 Reichsmarks to assist anyone was willing to try to depose Hugenberg. Other industrialists such as Friedrich Springorum of the Ruhr were still committed to Hugenberg, albeit only on the negative grounds that to depose Hugenberg would split the DNVP even more. The steel magnate Fritz Thyssen abandoned the DNVP for the NSDAP, issuing a statement blaming all of the problems in the Harzburg Front on Hugenberg, and claimed that Hitler was the best man to end the Weimar Republic, which was why he had joined the NSDAP. Seeing his plans unravel inspired Hugenberg to write in a letter to Leo Wegener on 15 March 1932 that he was not a leader, but a "chicken ladder", a reference to the German proverb "life is a chicken ladder – shit on from top to bottom".

In the election for the Prussian Landtag on 24 April 1932, Hugenberg campaigned for a NSDAP-DNVP coalition, stating in a speech on 21 April 1932: "We owe it to youth and to our children, to stress loudly and clearly in this campaign that we are not National Socialists and that the National Socialists alone on their own and without us are unable to solve the problems of our time." Despite his appeal, DNVP voters deserted their party for the Nazis in massive numbers, with the DNVP suffering a 56% decline in their share of the vote compared to the last Prussian election of 1928. By contrast, the Nazis went from having 8 seats in the Prussian Landtag to having 162 seats. As Prussia was the largest and most populous of Germany's states, the Prussian election was widely taken as a sign that the Nazis had replaced the DNVP as the main party of the right.

Together with the German People's Party, the DNVP was the only party in the Reichstag that supported the new government led by Franz von Papen, and though three ministers in the new cabinet were DNVP members, Hugenberg himself was excluded. General von Bredow, the right-hand man of General Kurt von Schleicher, the mastermind who created the new Papen government, wrote in a memo that Hugenberg's "appearance, his speeches, his intractability" caused most people to naturally hate him, and keeping him out of the Papen cabinet would be an advantage. As Papen was not a member of any party after he resigned from the Centre Party, Hugenberg during the first Reichstag election campaign in the summer of 1932 presented voting for the DNVP as the best way to vote for Papen. As Papen was an extremely unpopular chancellor, this strategy was a disaster, and in the Reichstag election on 31 July 1932, the DNVP suffered its worse result ever, winning only 5.9% of the vote, giving the DNVP only 36 seats in the Reichstag. By contrast, the NSDAP had its best result ever in a free election, winning 37% of the vote and 230 seats in the Reichstag. Hugenberg, despite drubbing the DNVP had suffered in the election, remained optimistic. For Hugenberg, his politics of polarization had achieved its purpose by collapsing the "middle" in German politics as he had intended. Moreover, for him, the purpose of the "national bloc" was only a means to end "the system", as he called the Weimar Republic, from below; now the presidential government headed by Papen offered the means to end the Weimar Republic from above. The possibility of an alliance between the Nazis and the Centre without the DNVP, which was openly discussed, led Hugenberg to condemn Hitler for using parliamentary methods. Leading ministers in the Papen cabinet such as Defense Minister General Kurt von Schleicher; Foreign Minister Konstantin von Neurath and Interior Minister Wilhelm von Gayl often met with Hugenberg in private to discuss policies that the DNVP might support, and Papen in a letter stated that he agreed with Hugenberg's economic policies of cutting wages and protectionism.

When the Reichstag met on 12 September 1932, Papen was defeated by the most overwhelming motion of no confidence ever in German history, with 512 Reichstag members voting for the motion while only 42 voted against. At Papen's request, Hindenburg dissolved the Reichstag for new elections rather than allowing another government to be formed, and in the ensuing election campaign, Hugenberg took a strongly anti-Nazi line, portraying Hitler as irresponsible and dangerous. Hugenberg presented him as the foremost supporter of the Papen government, and the Hugenberg newspapers launched a sustained line of attack on the Nazis as opportunists who were willing to take Hugenberg's money, but not his guidance. During the election, Hugenberg came under pressure to resign from within his party and from many of the industrialists, with Hugo Stinnes in a letter of 19 September 1932 stating: "Hugenberg is certainly right, but he cannot inspire enthusiasm and that's what it's all about."

Hugenberg's party had experienced a growth in support in the November 1932 election at the expense of the Nazis. Hugenberg once again declared his support for Papen's presidential government and advised Hindenburg: "I have not found Hitler to be very loyal to agreements; his whole manner of handling political affairs makes it very difficult to be able to entrust Hitler with political leadership. I would have very grave reservations against this." In December 1932, Hugenberg drew up plans for a presidential government to be headed by the popular mayor of Leipzig, Carl Goerdeler, in which Hugenberg was to act as "economic dictator". As part of his plans, Hugenberg drew up a list of 13 "Urgent Measures" to impose totalitarian control, with all opposition to be considered treason, censorship to be imposed, strikes made illegal, and the police to be given power to take people into "protective custody" without charges. At the same time, Hugenberg wrote Hitler a letter suggesting that the Nazis take part as cabinet ministers in this proposed government. At a secret meeting between Hugenberg and Hitler, a reconciliation of sorts was agreed upon. Hugenberg hoped to harness the Nazis for his own ends once again, and as such, he dropped his attacks on them for the campaign for the March 1933 election.

== Hitler's rise to power ==
=== Negotiations with Papen and Hitler ===
In early January 1933, Chancellor Kurt von Schleicher developed plans for an expanded coalition government, to include not only Hugenberg, but also dissident Nazi Gregor Strasser and Centre Party politician Adam Stegerwald. Although Hugenberg had designs on a return to government, his hatred of trade union activity meant that he had no intention of working with Stegerwald, the head of the Catholic Trade Union movement. When Schleicher refused to exclude Stegerwald from his plans, Hugenberg broke off negotiations.

Hugenberg's main confidant, Reinhold Quaatz, had, despite being half-Jewish, pushed for Hugenberg to follow a more völkisch path and work with the Nazi Party, and after the collapse of the Schleicher talks, this was the path he followed. In Germany at the time, there were no public opinion polls (an American invention that only crossed the Atlantic later in the 1930s), and state elections were treated as the best barometer of public opinion. In the election held on 11 January 1933 in the small and mostly rural and Protestant state of Lippe, the DNVP fared badly, losing 4,000 votes while the Nazis gained 5,000 votes compared to the last Lippe election. Although Lippe was only a small state, the election result was taken as a sign that the Nazis had regained the momentum that they had lost with the most recent Reichstag election. Moreover, after almost five years as DNVP leader, Hugenberg was deeply frustrated and angry with his failure to achieve power despite all his efforts, and he became more desperate in this regard. Knowing that many people in his party wanted to see him resign, Hugenberg felt besieged. He wrote to Wegener on 2 January 1933: "I see the difficulties growing all around...I myself am growing older and often do not know how the difficulties should be overcome." Hugenberg desired a presidential government that would carry out the "urgent measures" he had envisioned, and although he initially wanted Goerdeler appointed chancellor, he was prepared to accept either Papen or Schleicher as a substitute.

Hugenberg and Hitler met on 17 January 1933, and Hugenberg suggested that they both enter the cabinet of Kurt von Schleicher, a proposal rejected by Hitler, who would not move from his demands for the chancellorship. Hitler agreed in principle to allow Schleicher to serve under him as Defense Minister, although Hugenberg warned the Nazi leader that as long as Paul von Hindenburg was president, Hitler would never be chancellor. A further meeting between the two threatened to derail any alliance after Hugenberg rejected Hitler's demands for Nazi control over the interior ministries of Germany and Prussia, but by this time Franz von Papen had come round to the idea of Hitler as chancellor, and he worked hard to persuade the two leaders to come together.

During the negotiations between Franz von Papen and president Paul von Hindenburg, Hindenburg had insisted that Hugenberg be given the ministries of Economics and Agriculture, both at national level and in Prussia, as a condition of Hitler becoming chancellor, something of a surprise given the President's well publicized dislike of Hugenberg. Hugenberg, eager for a share of power, agreed to the plan, and continued to believe that he could use Hitler for his own ends, telling the Stahlhelm leader Theodor Duesterberg that "we'll box Hitler in". On 27 January 1933, Hugenberg met with Hitler when he was informed Papen was now supporting a cabinet with Hitler as chancellor and Papen as vice-chancellor. Hugenberg could either realize his long sought dream of being the "economic dictator" or go into the opposition; he was inclined to the former. On 29 January, Papen met Hugenberg to tell him that he could be the "economic dictator" in a Hitler cabinet, a proposal that Hugenberg's deputy Otto Schmidt-Hanover dubbed "an attractive offer". Papen's assurances that Hitler would be "boxed in" since the majority of the cabinet would not be Nazis, coupled with the chance to be "economic dictator" led Hugenberg to accept Hitler as chancellor and join the new government.

=== Member of the Hitler cabinet ===
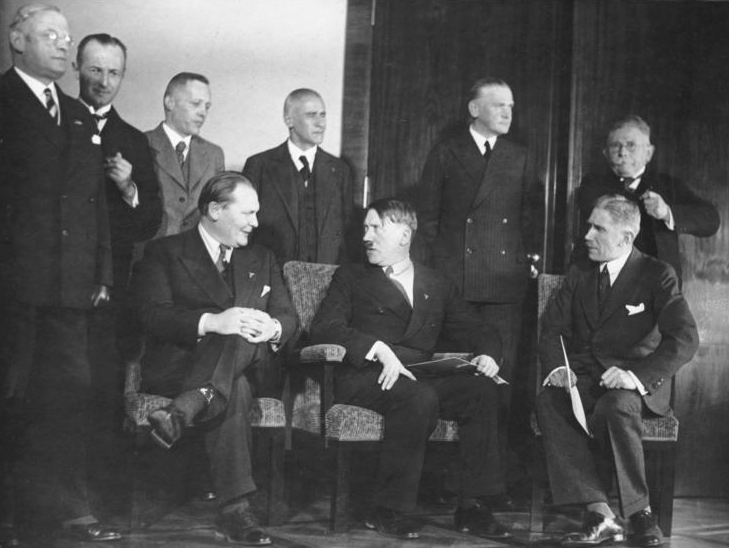
Hugenberg (standing, on the far right) in the first Hitler cabinet, 30 January 1933

Hugenberg agreed to join the Hitler government with the understanding that there would be no new Reichstag elections, and upon waiting to be sworn in by President Hindenburg, he first learned that Hitler was planning to call new elections, precipitating a lengthy shouting match with Hitler. The chief of the presidential chancellery, Otto Meißner, was forced to appear at the president's office to relay that Hindenburg had been forced to wait an extra half-hour and was threatening to call off the swearing-in ceremony. Papen mediated the dispute, stating that the matter of new elections would be considered after the new government was sworn in. Hugenberg initially rejected Hitler's plans to immediately call a fresh election, fearing the damage such a vote might inflict on his own party but, after being informed by Otto Meißner that the plan had Hindenburg's endorsement, and by Papen that Schleicher was preparing to launch a military coup, he acceded to Hitler's wishes. Hugenberg vigorously campaigned for the NSDAP–DNVP alliance, although other leading members within his party expressed fears over socialist elements and Nazi rhetoric. They appealed for a non-party dictatorship, but Hitler ignored their pleas.

Knowing of Hugenberg's strong anti-Polish tendencies, the Polish ambassador, Alfred Wysocki, reported to the Polish Foreign Minister, Jozef Beck, that the most dangerous member of the cabinet of the new government was not Hitler, but rather Hugenberg. Hugenberg, who served jointly as the Reich and Prussian ministers of economics and agriculture, and boasted of his plans to be "economic dictator", was widely seen as the dominant minister in the new government. The French ambassador André François-Poncet reported to Paris, "in the association of the three men [Hitler, Papen and Hugenberg] [...] the least dangerous, the least troublesome is certainly not M. Hugenberg". Hugenberg named Paul Bang, the economic expert of the Pan-German League, as the state secretary (the number two man) in the Economics ministry. Bang was noted for his "autarkic ideas and racist fanaticism" and proved more interested in anti-Semitic laws than in the economy. The man whom Hugenberg named as state secretary in the Agriculture ministry, Hans-Joachim von Rohr, proved more interested in his portfolio, but in common with many other people found Hugenberg a difficult man to work with.

Hugenberg made no effort to stop Hitler's ambition of becoming a dictator; he himself was authoritarian by inclination. On 2 February 1933, Hitler asked Hindenburg to dissolve the Reichstag for new elections, a request that was granted. In a statement to the press, the new government announced with no sense of irony that the elections were necessary to "end the loss of honor and freedom" in Germany, said to have started with the November revolution of 1918. Hitler wanted a new Reichstag to pass the Enabling Act, a special emergency law that would allow the chancellor to govern via decree instead of the Reichstag. In an editorial published in all his newspapers, Hugenberg defended the new government as necessary to defend the "Christian conservative way of life" against the forces of "atheism and liberalism, socialism and Marxism" and to return to the "pure state" that operated "according to the Prussian tradition". Though he could not attack his coalition ally too much, Hugenberg argued that his supporters should vote DNVP because the Nazis had "not unambiguously recognized the principles of private economy". At a rally on 11 February 1933 attended by Papen and the Stahlhelm leader Franz Seldte, Hugenberg announced the formation of the "Battle Front Black-White-Red", saying the "national movement advanced in two columns", one being the Nazis and the other being the "proper right, the Battle Front Black-White-Red, the national bourgeoise of the best tradition". Hugenberg used his control of UFA in the election, having UFA cinemas show newsreels that emphasized his role in the new government. During the election, UFA cinemas played films that were markedly nationalist.

When the Reichstag was burned down on 28 February 1933 in act of arson committed by the Dutch communist Marinus van der Lubbe who had decided to burn down the Reichstag as an act of political protest, Hugenberg agreed with Hitler's claim that the fire was part of a Communist plot. In a speech given right after the Reichstag fire, Hugenberg spoke of the need for "draconian measures" against Communists and of "exterminating the hotbeds in which Bolshevism can flourish", adding that "in these earnest times there can no longer be any half measure ...no compromise, no cowardice". Along with the other DNVP members of the cabinet, he voted for the Reichstag Fire Decree of 1933, which effectively wiped out civil liberties. The Reichstag election of 5 March 1933 was by Hugenberg's own admission a "failure" as the DNVP won only 3.1 million votes compared to the NSDAP, which won 17 million votes. Under the Reichstag Fire Decree, Hitler had banned the German Communist Party (KPD), which meant that even without the DNVP, the Nazis still had a majority in the new Reichstag. Hugenberg was quietly concerned about what Hitler might do if the Reichstag passed the Enabling Act, and tried to include some amendments intended to limit Hitler's power, only to be undercut by Hindenburg and by calls from within his own party to merge with the Nazi party. Hugenberg together with the rest of the DNVP Reichstag members voted for the Enabling Act, which Hugenberg rationalized on the grounds that the activation of the Enabling Act referred to the "present government", which Hugenberg took to mean that Hitler could not dismiss him from the cabinet. Of all members of the Reichstag, only the Social Democrats voted against the Enabling Act (the KPD having already been banned).

== Removal from politics ==
In the elections, Hugenberg's DNVP captured 52 seats in the Reichstag, although any hope that these seats could ensure influence for the party evaporated with the passing of the Enabling Act of 1933 (which the DNVP supported) soon after the vote. Nevertheless, Hugenberg was Minister of the Economy in the new government and was also appointed Minister of Agriculture in the Nazi cabinet, largely due to the support his party enjoyed amongst the north German landowners. Papen, who envisioned himself as a check on Hitler, proved to be too superficial a personality for such a role, while Hugenberg, who usually worked 14 hours a day, proved himself to be too involved in the intricacies of his portfolios to offer an effective check. Hugenberg, who refused to hire a secretary and wrote all of his lengthy memos by hand as he did not know how to use a typewriter, proved to be a stubborn and unlikable man, whom even the other conservative ministers found difficult to deal with. Hugenberg fancied himself the "economic dictator", but at cabinet meetings the other conservative ministers such as Papen, Foreign Minister Baron Konstantin von Neurath and Defense Minister General Werner von Blomberg all objected to Hugenberg's plans for an autarkic economy as unworkable and likely to isolate Germany internationally. Neurath, an experienced diplomat who had previously served as the ambassador in London and Rome, argued that the principal danger from abroad was the prospect of a "preventive war" from France. To end this prospect, Neurath argued that Germany, for the moment, needed to present itself as a more or less cooperative member of the international community, and that the economic policies advocated by Hugenberg were likely to cost Germany goodwill at a time when goodwill was much needed.

As Minister, Hugenberg declared a temporary moratorium on foreclosures, cancelled some debts and placed tariffs on some widely produced agricultural goods in order to stimulate the sector. As a move to protect dairy farming, he also placed limits on margarine production, although this move saw a rapid increase in the price of butter and margarine and made Hugenberg an unpopular figure outside of the farming community, hastening the inevitable departure of the non-Nazi from the cabinet. The DNVP for its all hostility towards liberalism, was deeply committed to the Rechtsstaat (Rule of Law) and unaccustomed to dealing with Nazi dynamism and contempt for laws, as the Nazis tended to act illegally and present a fait accompli to their DNVP allies, who meekly accepted what had been done. On 17 May 1933, Hugenberg met with Hindenburg to complain that the Nazis forced some civil servants who were DNVP members out of their jobs or alternatively forced them to join the NSDAP. Hindenburg proved to be uninterested and told Hugenberg of his belief "that the Reich Chancellor has the best intentions and with clean hands works in the interest of the Fatherland and in the spirit of justice". Hindenburg conceded that some of the Nazis were acting illegally, but told Hugenberg that he would take no action because this was a "critical time" and one must remember "what a national upsurge the new movement has brought us".

Meanwhile, in June 1933, Hitler was forced to disavow the plan Hugenberg proposed while attending the London World Economic Conference, that a program of German colonial expansion in both Africa and Eastern Europe was the best way of ending the Great Depression, which created a major storm abroad. Hugenberg argued in a speech given in London on 16 June 1933 that Germany needed the return of all its former colonies in Africa in order to "open up for a Volk ohne Raum (nation without space) areas which could provide space for the settlement of its vigorous race and construct great works of peace". Both the French and Soviet governments formally submitted notes of protest, the French government because of the demand to return the former colonies in Africa, while the Soviet government objected to the fact that the Soviet Union was the Lebensraum that Hugenberg had in mind for German colonization. In an attempt to contain the damage caused by Hugenberg, Neurath issued a statement to the British press, saying these were merely the "private" views of the Economics minister. Rather than accept the rebuke, Hugenberg chose to issue a statement claiming he was speaking on behalf of the German government, an action that made the German delegation appear to be "ridiculous", as Neurath complained at a subsequent cabinet meeting. Neurath told the cabinet that "a single member cannot simply overlook the objections of the others" and that Hugenberg "either did not understand these objections, which were naturally clothed in polite form, or he did not want to understand them". The fact that Hugenberg chose to engage in a vendetta with Neurath over the conflicting press releases issued in London instead of dropping the matter as Neurath had urged him to do made him appear very petty and spiteful and cost him whatever sympathy he might have enjoyed from the other conservative cabinet ministers. In a further blow, during his time in London, the party had disbanded both the Kampfring, the para-military wing of the DNVP and its youth wing, the Bismarck Youth. Hugenberg's fate was sealed when the Prussian State Secretary Fritz Reinhardt, ostensibly a subordinate to Hugenberg as Minister of Economy, presented a work-creation plan to the cabinet. The policy was supported by every member except Hugenberg.

An increasingly isolated figure, Hugenberg was finally forced to resign from the cabinet after a whisper campaign against him to remove him from power. He announced his formal resignation on 29 June 1933, and he was replaced by others who were loyal to the Nazi Party, Kurt Schmitt in the Economics Ministry and Richard Walther Darré in the Agriculture Ministry. A "Friendship Agreement" was signed between the Nazis and the DNVP immediately afterwards, the terms of which effectively dissolved the Nationalists, with members urged to join the Nazi Party. Indeed, the German National Front (DNF), as the DNVP had officially been called since May 1933, had officially dissolved itself on 27 June. Hugenberg signed a written agreement to dissolve the DNF, in return for which Hitler promised that civil servants who were DNF members would be recognised as "full and legally equal co-fighters" and to release those party members in jail. Hugenberg's last statement to the party's executive committee was that "we all have cause to go home and to crawl into our closets or go into the woods".

Although driven from his cabinet post, Hugenberg was, along with Papen and other former DNVP and Centre Party members, included on the Nazi list of candidates for the November 1933 election. However, his stock with the Nazis had fallen so much that in December 1933 the Telegraph Union, the news agency owned by Hugenberg, was de facto taken over by the Propaganda Ministry and merged into a new German News Office. Hugenberg was allowed to remain in the Reichstag until 1945 as one of 22 so-called "guest" members who were officially designated as non-party representatives. Given that they shared the assembly with 639 Nazi deputies, and given that the Reichstag met on an increasingly infrequent basis in any event, independents like Hugenberg had no influence.

=== Newspapers by Scherl-Verlags (bought by Hugenberg) ===
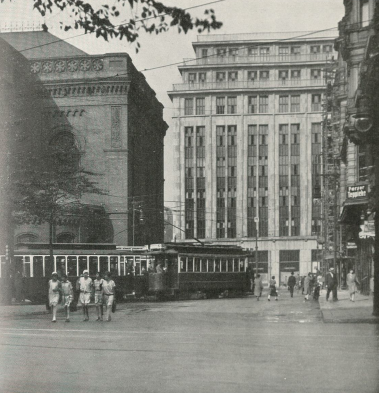
Berlin Scherlhaus, 1928

- Der Tag
- Berliner Lokal-Anzeiger
- Berliner Illustrierte Nachtausgabe
- Die Woche
- Scherl's Magazin
- Gartenlaube
- Silberspiegel
- Allgemeiner Wegweiser
- Scherls Wohnungs-Zeitung
- Filmwelt
- Denken und Raten
- Das Grundeigentum
- Der Kinematograph
- Echo
- Deutsche technische Auslandszeitschrift
- Der Adler

=== Newspapers owned or partly owned by the Hugenberg company ===
- Hannoverscher Kurier
- Schlesische Zeitung
- Lippische Tageszeitung
- Merseburger Tageblatt
- München-Augsburger Abendzeitung
- Rheinisch-Westfälische Zeitung
- Bergisch-Märkische Zeitung
- Schwäbischer Kurier
- Magdeburger Tageszeitung
- Weimarer Zeitung
- Saale Zeitung
- Mitteldeutsche Zeitung
- Eiserne Blätter
- Deutsche Zeitung
- Motorschau – Nationale Deutsche Motorfahrt-Zeitung
- Kösliner Zeitung
- Stargarder Zeitung
- Oberschlesische Tageszeitung
- Oppelner Nachrichten
- Volksbote f. d. Kreise Kreuzburg u. Rosenberg
- Rosenberger Zeitung
- Stralsunder Zeitung
- Münchner Neueste Nachrichten
- Fränkischer Kurier
- Hamburger Nachrichten
- Leipziger Neueste Nachrichten

== Later years ==
Although Hugenberg had lost the Telegraph Union early on, he retained most of his media interests until 1943, when the Eher Verlag purchased his Scherl House. Hugenberg did not let them go cheaply, however, as he negotiated a large portfolio of shares in the Rhenish-Westphalian industries in return for his cooperation. Hugenberg last saw Hitler in February 1935, when he presented a plan to replace rental housing with condominiums, which went nowhere. By 1935, Hugenberg owned only the Scherl newspapers and UFA, which gave him an annual income of 500,000 Reichsmarks. The Scherl newspapers, such as the Berliner Illustrierte Nachtausgabe and Der Adler, continued to be published under the Third Reich and sold well. The negotiations for the forced sale of the Scherl house were conducted by the Reich Economics minister, Walther Funk, who essentially told Hugenberg that he had to sell the Scherl newspapers, but that they would pay any price he asked for. Shortly after the sale in 1944, a British bombing raid wrecked the newspaper plant where the Scherl papers were published. Hugenberg's son was killed in action on the Eastern Front; characteristically, he refused to express any grief in public lest he be accused of weakness.

At the end of the war, Hugenberg was living at his estate in Rohbraken in Lippe, which ended up being in the British occupation zone. Hugenberg was arrested by British military police on 28 September 1946, and his remaining assets were frozen. Hugenberg was detained for 9 months in Staumühle by the British authority and then transferred to German authority for denazification. In 1949, a Denazification court at Detmold adjudged him a "Mitläufer" ("fellow traveller") rather than a Nazi, meaning that he was allowed to keep his property and business interests. Hugenberg spent the last years of his life denying any responsibility for the Nazi regime, continuing to insist that he had always acted correctly and that he had nothing to be ashamed of. He died in Kükenbruch (now part of Extertal) near Detmold on 12 March 1951, having only the company of a nurse, as he wished his family not to see him in his death throes.

== Bibliography ==
- Evans, Richard J. (2004). The Coming of the Third Reich. Penguin Books. ISBN 978-0143034698.
- Evans, Richard J. (2006). The Third Reich in Power. Penguin Books. ISBN 978-0143037903.
- Leopold, John A. (1977). Alfred Hugenberg: The radical nationalist campaign against the Weimar Republic. Yale University Press. ISBN 978-0300020687.
- Turner, Henry Ashby (1997). Hitler's Thirty Days to Power: January 1933. Basic Books. ISBN 978-0201328004.

Party political offices
Preceded by Kuno von Westarp	Leader of the German National People's Party; 1928 – 1933	Position abolished
Political offices
Preceded by Hermann Warmbold	Minister of Economics; 1933	Succeeded by Kurt Schmitt
Preceded by Magnus Freiherr von Braun	Minister for Food and Agriculture; 1933	Succeeded by Richard Walther Darré
