= Kurt Schmitt =

German jurist (1886–1950)

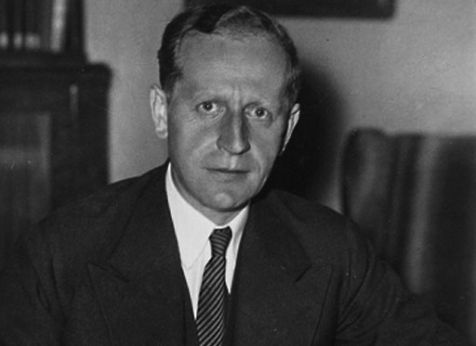
- Schmitt as director of Allianz

Reich Minister of Economics
- In office 29 June 1933 – 3 August 1934 (formally on leave until 30 January 1935)
- President: Paul von Hindenburg; Adolf Hitler (as Führer)
- Chancellor: Adolf Hitler
- Preceded by: Alfred Hugenberg
- Succeeded by: Hjalmar Schacht

Personal details
- Born: 7 October 1886 Heidelberg, Grand Duchy of Baden, German Empire
- Died: 2 November 1950 (aged 64) Heidelberg, West Germany
- Profession: Economist

Kurt Paul Schmitt (7 October 1886 – 2 November 1950) was a German jurist versed in economic matters. A supporter of the Nazis since 1930, he joined the Nazi party in 1933, and was made an SS-Brigadeführer in 1935. He was the board chairman of Allianz insurance company from 1921 to 1933 and was the Reich Economy Minister from 1933 to 1934. His antisemitic views led him to believe that the role Jews played in politics, law and the arts was excessive, and had to be drastically curtailed if not eliminated. He was the board chairman of Munich Re during World War II. After the fall of the Nazi regime, he was removed from all his positions and underwent denazification procedures, which resulted in the payment of a fine.

== Biography ==
Born in Heidelberg, jurist Kurt Schmitt graduated in 1911 in Munich with the thesis "The Ongoing Credit Report, in Particular the Credit Referencing Agreement", and then went into the service of the Allianz AG insurance company. From 1914 to 1917, he participated in World War I and was discharged having reached the rank of captain. In 1917, he became a member of the Allianz board of directors, leading the company from 1921 to 1933 as chairman of the board. During these years, he made a name for himself as one of the most gifted leaders when it came to organisation in the Weimar Republic's insurance industry.

Allianz's leadership, represented by directors Kurt Schmitt and Eduard Hilgard, led a policy of drawing nearer to the Nazis, even before they seized power. Already in October 1930, ties were forged with Hermann Göring. These contacts were realised through company dinners and by providing private financial loans. Heinrich Brüning and Franz von Papen tried without success to get Schmitt a ministerial office.

Schmitt, who was also General Director of the Stuttgart Mutual Insurance Corporation (Stuttgarter Verein-Versicherungs AG) by 1931, was included in Hjalmar Schacht's objectives in mid-1931.

On 18 December 1932, he participated in a meeting of the Circle of Friends of the Economy (Freundeskreis der Wirtschaft), or Circle of Twelve (Zwölferkreis) at the Berlin Kaiserhof, where the Nazi Party agreed to lend its support. Schmitt now had closer relations with the Nazi leadership and on 20 February 1933, he, along with Hermann Göring, took part in a meeting that Adolf Hitler had with German industrialists, at which Schmitt made an election campaign donation to the Nazis of RM 10,000. In early 1933, Schmitt joined the Nazi Party (membership no. 2,651,252). He likewise took over the posts of Vice President of the Berlin Chamber of Industry and of the Chamber of Commerce in 1933.

Meanwhile, Schmitt was convinced that the Nazis could deal with the problem of joblessness if the economy was led by people like him. Furthermore, he held Hitler to be a great statesman and believed that over time, the Führer would grow to become less radical. Moreover, he had a latent antisemitic attitude, which Gerald D. Feldmann describes as follows: "Schmitt shared the belief that Jews were overrepresented within the academic professions, and that the rôle that they played in politics, law, and the arts would have to be greatly limited, if not utterly eliminated. He believed, however, that they were entitled to a place in German economic life, and made it into a maxim of his year in office as Reich Economy Minister that there was no "Jewish question in the economy".

On 29 June 1933, Schmitt was appointed Reich Minister of Economics as well as Prussian Minister of Economics and Labour, succeeding Alfred Hugenberg, and he also took on honorary membership in the SS (member number 101,346). In August 1933, he took the function of Prussian Plenipotentiary in the Reich Government. On 11 July 1933, he was named to the recently reconstituted Prussian State Council by Prussian Minister President Hermann Göring. On 3 October he became an inaugural member of Hans Frank's Academy for German Law.

On 13 March 1934, Schmitt made known what the new arrangement would be for the industrial economy. The leader of the overall organisation of the industrial economy was to be Philipp Kessler, as leader of the Reich Federation of the Electrical Industry. When Schmitt wanted to replace the Reich Federation of German Industry with overall state control, he ran up against concentrated resistance from business leaders. Furthermore, Hjalmar Schacht undertook efforts to oust Schmitt from his ministerial office so that he could take it over himself. During a speech on 28 June 1934, Schmitt had a heart attack and collapsed. He used this opportunity to go on a long recuperative holiday. When he departed on this extended leave of absence, Schacht took over the management of Schmitt's ministries on 3 August 1934. On 30 January 1935, Hitler approved Schmitt's dismissal from ministerial office and Schacht formally became Reich and Prussian Economy Minister.

After coming back from his extended leave in 1935, Schmitt took over the chairmanship in the supervisory board of AEG AG and the Deutsche Continental Gasgesellschaft (a gas company) in Dessau. In 1937 and until 1945, he held the board chairmanship of Münchener Rückversicherung AG. He was also on Allianz AG's supervisory board until 1945. As a member of the Freundeskreis Reichsführer-SS, Heinrich Himmler promoted him to SS-Brigadeführer on 15 September 1935. Since Schmitt was functioning as AEG supervisory board chairman, they donated to Himmler between RM 12,000 and 15,000 yearly, and Münchner Rückversicherung and Continental Gasgesellschaft between RM 6,000 and 8,000.

From 1945 to 1949, Schmitt had to undergo Denazification, administered by the United States Army. He lost all his offices and was barred from practising his profession. In 1946, he was classified as a Hauptschuldiger (lit. "main culprit"). This designation was reviewed in several court proceedings and was overturned in 1949. He would now only be classified as a Mitläufer, or follower. He nevertheless still had to pay a fine and the court costs.

== Decorations ==
In 1914, Schmitt was awarded the Iron Cross 2nd class. He also received the Verwundetenabzeichen in black, an award given to wounded soldiers. Further decorations: the War Merit Cross first class without swords, the War Merit Cross 2nd class without swords. From the SS, he received the "Reichsführer-SS Sword of Honour" and the "Totenkopfring der SS" (SS Death's Head Ring).

== Literature ==
- Gerald D. Feldman, Die Allianz und die deutsche Versicherungswirtschaft 1933 bis 1945, C. H. Beck, Munich 2001
- August Heinrichsbauer, Schwerindustrie und Politik, Essen 1948
- Lilla, Joachim (2005). Der Preußische Staatsrat 1921–1933: Ein biographisches Handbuch. Düsseldorf: Droste Verlag. ISBN 978-3-770-05271-4.
- Ulrich Völklein, Geschäfte mit dem Feind, Hamburg 2002, ISBN 3-203-83700-5
