= Harzburg Front =

German far-right political alliance (1931-1933)

- Leader: Adolf Hitler; Alfred Hugenberg
- Founded: 11 October 1931; 94 years ago
- Dissolved: 1933; 93 years ago
- Ideology: Völkisch nationalism
- Political position: Far-right
- Member parties: NSDAP; DNVP; Der Stahlhelm; Agricultural League; Pan-German League
- Colors: Black White Red (German Imperial colours)

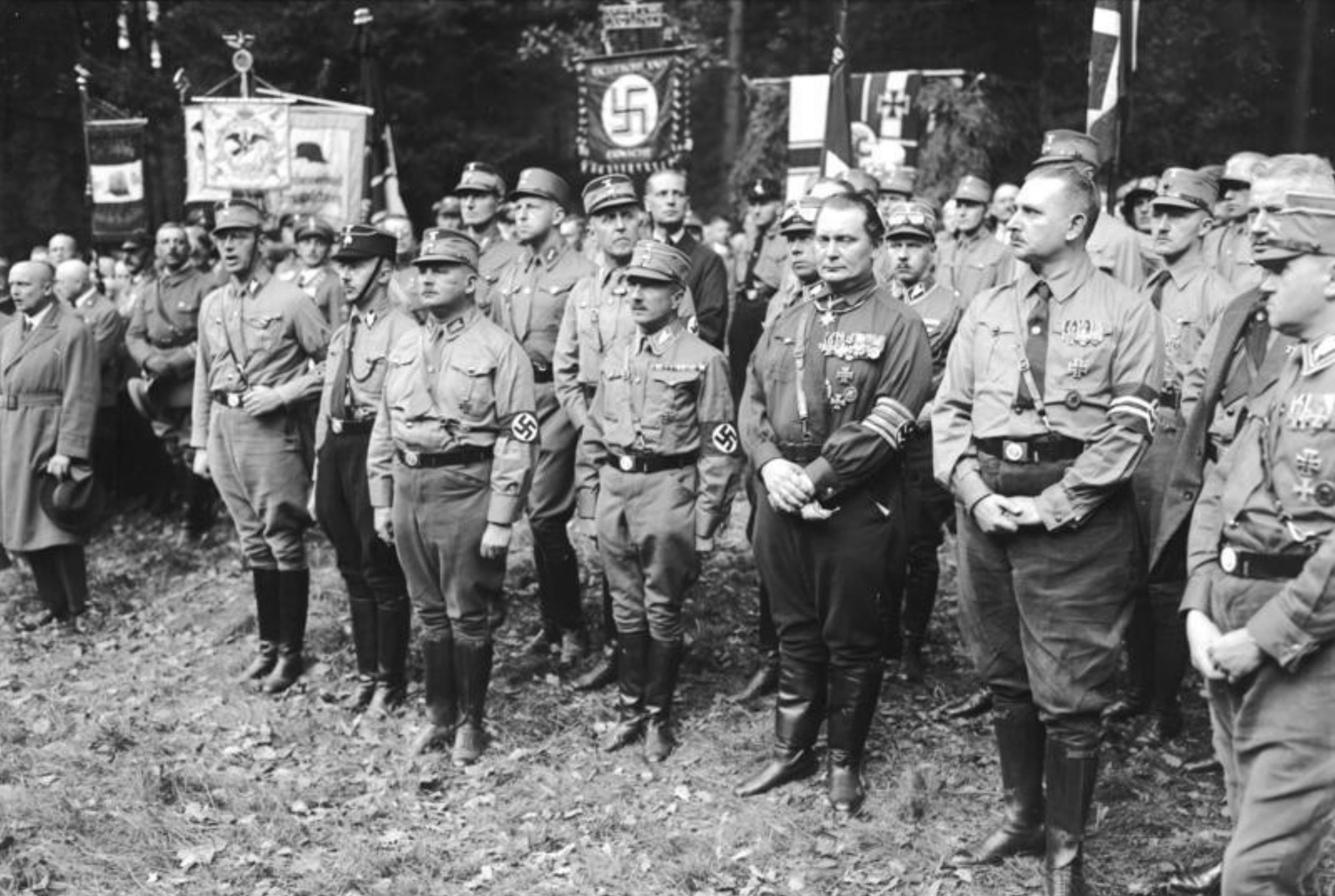
Camp service of the NSDAP delegation, in the first row SS Chief Heinrich Himmler, SA Chief Ernst Röhm and Hermann Göring

The Harzburg Front (German: Harzburger Front) was a short-lived far-right and anti-democratic political alliance in Weimar Germany, formed in 1931 as an attempt to present a unified opposition to the government of Chancellor Heinrich Brüning. It was a coalition of the national conservative German National People's Party (DNVP) under millionaire press-baron Alfred Hugenberg with Adolf Hitler's National Socialist German Workers' Party (NSDAP), the leadership of Der Stahlhelm paramilitary veterans' association, the Agricultural League and the Pan-German League organizations.

== Events ==
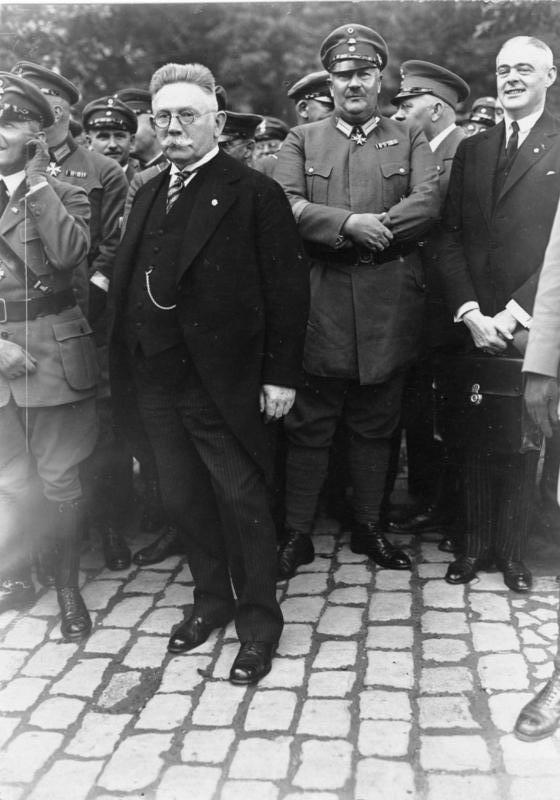
Bad Harzburg, 10 October 1931: Hugenberg (l.) and Prince Eitel Friedrich

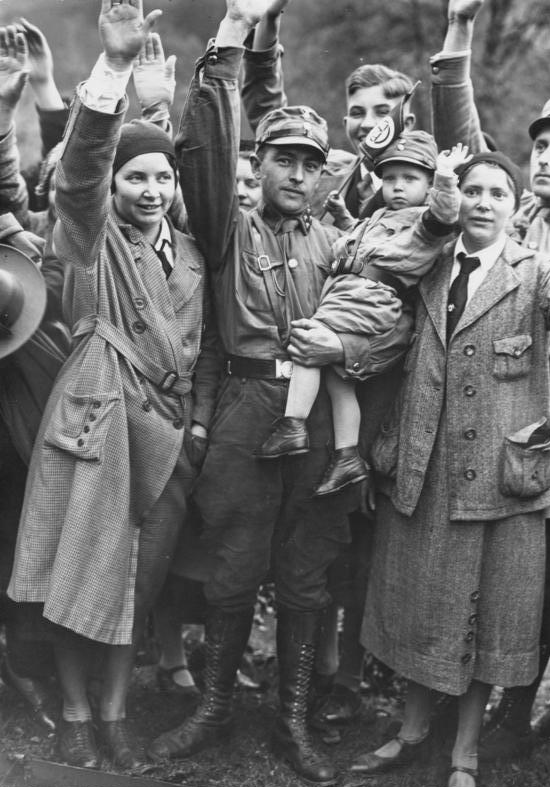
Nazi Party enthusiasts.

The Front formed on Sunday, 11 October 1931 at a convention of representatives of the varying political groupings styling themselves the "national opposition" at the spa town of Bad Harzburg in the Free State of Brunswick, where the NSDAP's Dietrich Klagges had just been elected State Minister of the Interior. By choosing the province, the organizers avoided a rigid approval procedure, conducted by the Social Democratic Prussian government, as well as possible Communist protests. Several local communists were nevertheless arrested. They were charged with sedition and compromising public security. Many Harzburg citizens appreciated the gathering (and the accompanying revenues).

The participating organisations had already undertaken the ultimately-unsuccessful joint "Liberty Law" campaign against the Young Plan on war reparations in 1929, by which Hitler had become an accepted ally of anti-democratic national conservative circles. In the course of the Great Depression, the Reich government under the Social Democratic chancellor Hermann Müller had broken up in March 1930, whereafter former Chief of the German General Staff and Reich President Field Marshal Paul von Hindenburg had promoted the succession of Centre politician Heinrich Brüning to rule by authoritarian Article 48 emergency decrees. His policies however intensified the crisis and in the election of September 1930, the NSDAP made the breakthrough with 18.2% of the vote cast (+15.7%), while the DNVP dropped to 7.0% (-7.3%). Hitler had outpaced his conservative associates, and he reluctantly assented to appear at Bad Harzburg, but he had no intention to serve as Hugenberg's assistant.

In addition to the leadership of the DNVP and NSDAP, Sturmabteilung (SA) chief Ernst Röhm, Reichsführer-SS Heinrich Himmler and Reichstag MP Hermann Göring, the meeting was attended by numerous representatives on the right of German politics including the Hohenzollern princes Eitel Friedrich of Prussia and his brother August Wilhelm (sons of the exiled Emperor Wilhelm II) and further prominent members of the Prussian aristocracy, the Stahlhelm leaders Franz Seldte and Theodor Duesterberg, former General Walther von Lüttwitz behind the Kapp Putsch and former commander of the Baltic Sea Division and Baltische Landeswehr General Rüdiger von der Goltz, former Reichswehr Chief of Staff General Hans von Seeckt (then Reichstag MP of the national liberal German People's Party), the Pan-German League chairman Heinrich Class, State Minister Klagges as well as some representatives of the business party such as steel magnate Fritz Thyssen and the Vereinigten vaterländischen Verbände Deutschlands ("United Patriotic Associations of Germany", VvVD) under von der Goltz. The non-partisan Hjalmar Schacht, as a highly respected fiscal expert who had resigned as Reichsbank president the year before in protest against the Young Plan, vehemently spoke against Brüning's economic and financial policy, which caused a great stir. However, most leaders of industry and big business who had been invited to attend were notably absent. Only Ernst Brandi attended.

Hugenberg had intended to use the Harzburg meeting as a forum to form a united opposition cabinet representing "national Germany" (the parties and the groups of the right) under his leadership and to agree upon a single candidate to represent the right at the forthcoming presidential elections scheduled for 1932. However, personal and ideological differences caused such a united opposition never to materialise. The evening before the meeting, Hitler had been personally received by President Hindenburg for the first time and in the night left for Bad Harzburg conscious that he would be the actual strong man on the right.

The NSDAP viewed the aging Hugenberg and his companions with distrust and contempt. It was determined to avoid making any commitments that would undermine the independence of its movement. Although it had entered regional coalition governments with the DNVP, and Hugenberg and Schacht would both serve in Hitler's first national cabinet, the NSDAP was already determined that it would take power on its own terms and only as leaders of any coalition that it entered. Until the final rally, Hitler evaded all joint appearances. In the end, the participants found no common ground beyond their enmity against the Brüning Cabinet and Otto Braun's Prussian government.

== Aftermath ==
A motion of no confidence against Chancellor Brüning, jointly initiated in the Reichstag on 16 October, failed. In reaction to the events in Bad Harzburg, the left-wing Reichsbanner Schwarz-Rot-Gold, the Social Democratic Party (SPD) and the Free Trade Unions forged the Iron Front alliance on 16 December 1931. Ultimately the Harzburg Front failed to produce an effective or united right-wing opposition to the Weimar Republic, mainly due to the intransigence of the NSDAP and the differences in political aims and opinions of the varying groups approached by Hugenberg. Negotiations between the NSDAP, the DNVP and Stahlhelm over a shared presidential candidate broke down in February 1932, with Hitler accusing Hugenberg of pursuing "socially reactionary policies", and eventually Hitler himself (quickly naturalized by the Free State of Brunswick) stood as the NSDAP candidate for president, while Hugenberg and his conservative allies presented Theodor Duesterberg in the first round and in the second round backed incumbent President Paul von Hindenburg.

However, when Brüning's government finally collapsed in May with Hindenburg appointing the "Cabinet of Barons" under Centre politician Franz von Papen, both sides again approached, culminating in the formation of a coalition government in the course of the Machtergreifung on 30 January 1933. In view of the federal election scheduled for March, the DNVP together with the Stahlhelm and the Agricultural League on 11 February once again formed a united Kampffront Schwarz-Weiß-Rot ("Struggle Front Black-White-Red" named after the colours of the German Empire) electoral alliance, before all right-wing organizations were dissolved by the NSDAP as part of the Gleichschaltung process.
