= August von Dönhoff =

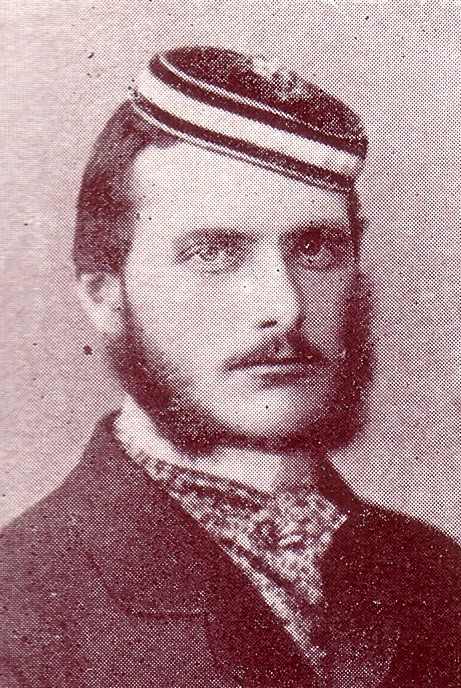
- Count Dönhoff as Bonner Preuße
- Born: 26 January 1845; Frankfurt
- Died: 9 November 1920 (aged 75)
- Occupation: Politician

August Karl Graf von Dönhoff-Friedrichstein (26 January 1845 – 9 September 1920) was a Prussian nobleman, diplomat and politician.

== Early life and ancestry ==
Born in Frankfurt, August Karl descended from the East Prussian branch of an ancient House of Dönhoff. He was the eldest son of Prussian foreign minister August Heinrich Hermann von Dönhoff and his wife, Countess Pauline von Lehndorff (1823-1889), daughter of Count Karl Friedrich Ludwig Christian von Lehndorff (1770-1854) and Countess Pauline Sophie von Schlippenbach (1805-1871).

== Biography ==
Dönhoff grew up in the family home, Friedrichstein Palace, not far from Königsberg and attended the Kneiphof Gymnasium. After the Abitur he studied law at the Rheinische Friedrich-Wilhelms-Universität Bonn. In 1865 he became a member of the Corps Borussia Bonn. As a Prussian major he took part in the Austro-Prussian War at the age of 21. From 1868 to 1870 he was an articled clerk at the Kammergericht and then served again as a major in the Franco-Prussian War. Like his father, Dönhoff also embarked on a diplomatic career and worked as secretary of legation for the Empire in Paris, Vienna, London, Saint Petersburg and Washington. In Washington he made friends with the Interior Minister Carl Schurz and accompanied him on an adventurous journey to the American West. Dönhoff laid down his diplomatic duties when, after his father's death in 1874, he took over his hereditary seat in the Prussian House of Lords. At the 1881 German federal election he moved as representative of the German Conservative Party into the Reichstag (German Empire). He was elected in the Reichstagswahllkreis Regierungsbezirk Königsberg 4. He belonged to this group until 1903, representing the interests of the East Elbian nobility and large estates. In 1906 he became a Prussian landowner. In 1917 August von Dönhoff was one of the founding members of the German Fatherland Party, which advocated a perseverance policy and a peace of victory in the First World War. Dönhoff died at the age of 75 at the Friedrichstein Palace.

== Marriage and issue ==
In 1896 Dönhoff married in Karwitz the 24 years younger Maria von Lepel (1869-1940), lady in waiting at the Court of Prussia, daughter of Wilhelm Friedrich Karl von Lepel (1829-1888) and Countess Helene von Schlippenbach (1835-1917), with whom he had eight children:

- William (d. 1897)
- Christa (1898-1924), married 1922 to Bruno Freiherr von Dellingshausen
- Heinrich Botho Eugen von Dönhoff (1899-1942), married 1938 with Dorothea Gräfin von Hatzfeldt-Wildenburg
- Yvonne Franziska Ilda (1901-1991), married in 1919 to Alexander von Kuenheim
- Dietrich Wilfried Georg Karl (1902-1991), married in 1933 to Karin ("Sissi") Countess von Lehndorff
- Christoph August Bernhard (1906-1992), married 1931 to Vera Burkart
- Maria Elisabeth Helene Freda (1908-1965), born with the Down syndrome, died in the Bethel Foundation
- Marion Dönhoff (1909-2002)
