= Heinrich Claß =

German politician (1868–1953)

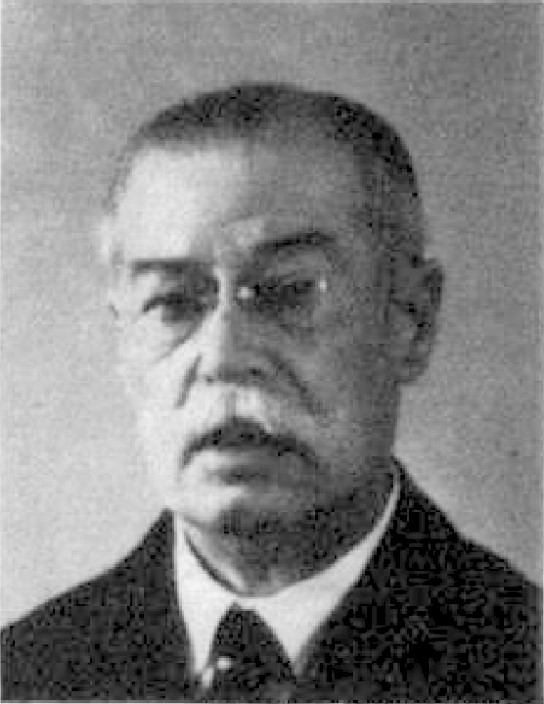
- Born: February 29, 1868; Alzey, Grand Duchy of Hesse, German Empire
- Died: April 16, 1953 (aged 85); Jena, East Germany
- Political party: Nazi Party, 1933-1939; DNVP, 1918-1933; German Fatherland Party, 1917-1918

Heinrich Claß (29 February 1868 – 16 April 1953) was a German far-right politician, Pan-Germanist, antisemite and "rabid racialist". He presided over the Pan-German League from 1908 to 1939.

== German Empire ==
Claß was born in Alzey. His father was a notary. He studied law at the University of Berlin, University of Freiburg and the University of Giessen up to 1891, when he became a legal trainee. In 1894, he settled in Mainz as a lawyer.

Despite the National Liberal politics of his upbringing, Claß became of devotee of far-right, völkist ideas. In 1894, Claß was a founding member of the nationalist and anti-semitic German Association (German: Deutschbund), which propagated "pure Germanism" by excluding ethnic minorities, particularly Jews. In 1897, he became the head of the Rhineland-Hesse branch of the Pan-German League, where he was elected to the directorate in 1901. When he became president in 1908, he changed the direction of the League to more radical positions. Claß's politics caused him to have frequent clashes with the Kaiser's government.

Claß viewed France as Germany's eternal enemy and viewed Great Britain as Germany's "treacherous cousin". This put him into sharp conflict with Theobald von Bethmann Hollweg during the Agadir Crisis in 1911, where Claß advocated a speedy war, which was to lead the German Empire to become "world power" and experience territorial expansion. Also in 1911, he was one of the founding members of the Deutscher Wehrverein (German Army Society), which tried to push for the armament of Germany. By this time he had begun promoting an anti-socialist coup, after which constitutional revisions would turn Germany into a plebiscitary dictatorship, which he believed would be the best way to prepare Germany for what he believed to be an inevitable imperialist war. Claß is commonly known for his books about far-right policy that were written under the pseudonym Daniel Frymann or Einhart, the most famous being his 1912 book Wenn ich der Kaiser wär' (If I Were the Kaiser) in which he agitates for imperialism, pan-Germanism and antisemitism.

During World War I, Claß alongside Alfred Hugenberg called for the annexation and depopulation of large western and eastern territories to be populated by German settlers, but as the war went on his unrealistic demands made him increasingly irrelevant. In 1917, he founded the German Fatherland Party with Alfred von Tirpitz and Wolfgang Kapp. Also in 1917, a group of investors led by Claß took over the Deutsche Zeitung newspaper, turning it into a völkist propaganda outlet. At the end of World War 1, he fled from the French occupied Mainz to Würzburg.

== Post-monarchy ==
After the end of World War I, Claß quickly began calling for the destruction of the Weimar republic. He supported both the Kapp Putsch, but its failure at the hands of popular resistance convinced him that any future dictatorships would need to be acceptable to the German people, with him believing that the Germans people should be eased into a dictatorship, with him later on abandoning his support of "putschism" all together.

In 1924 he was suspected in a conspiracy to murder Hans von Seeckt, in January 1926, he began plotting a coup which would see President Hindenburg dissolve the Reichstag and establish an authoritarian regency, and in May his home was searched over suspicions of another coup plot. But in all three cases, he was able to avoid punishment due to a lack of evidence. These victories allowed him to secure his leadership over the broader Pan-German movement but they took an enormous toll on his overall well-being especially after his wife died in the summer of 1927. He had been suffering from nerve and cervical vertebra paralysis since 1924 and he suffered from ever worsening bouts of poor health, with him often being absent from his duties for weeks or months at a time.

Around 1920–1921, he had begun a relationship with Hitler and the Nazi Party and supported the Beer Hall Putsch but the failure of the Beer Hall Putsch led him to focus his efforts on the DNVP. He played a major role in radicalizing the DNVP away from Westarp towards the more radical Hugenberg In 1928, despite his failed attempts to do so from 1925 to 1927. He played major roles in both the Young Plan Referendum and the Harzburg Front.

After the 1930 German Election Claß and his League found themselves increasingly torn between the ascendant Nazis and the collapsing DNVP, with Claß failing to exert significant influence on the Nazis, prevent the DNVP's electoral collapse, or establish the League as an independent force in German politics. After the July 1932 election the Nazis began attacking the ostensibly allied DNVP and Pan-German League while negotiating with the Centre Party, these moves both infuriated and confused Claß, who began attacking Hitler for having been unwilling to form a united far-right and for having previously attacked the League. However, due to their strength, Claß was unwilling to call for a break with the Nazis. As the group's decline unfolded, there was some criticism of Claß from within the League, but his decades of rule over the organization allowed him to survive these attacks. Illness prevented him from trying to prevent Hitler's appointment as Chancellor. After the rise of the Nazi Party, he served in the Reichstag as a "guest" of the party, but Hitler was suspicious of his Monarchism, ties to Hugenberg, and past criticisms of the Nazi Party. As such, Claß was increasingly sidelined, with the Pan-German League being dissolved in 1939.

After his political career ended, he lived in Berlin until his house was destroyed in an allied bombing raid. From 1943 to 1953, Claß lived with his daughter in Jena, where he died.

== Works ==
- Bilanz eines neuen Kurses. – Berlin : Alldt. Verl., 1903
- (as Einhart): Deutsche Geschichte. – Leipzig : Diederich, 1909
- (as Daniel Frymann): Wenn ich der Kaiser wär': Politische Wahrheiten und Notwendigkeiten. – Leipzig : Dieterich, 1912 (from 1925 known as Das Kaiserbuch)
- West-Marokko deutsch!. – Munich : Lehmann, 1911
- Wider den Strom : vom Werden und Wachsen der nationalen Opposition im alten Reich. – Leipzig : Köhler, 1932
- Zum deutschen Kriegsziel. Eine Flugschrift. – Munich : Lehmann, 1917
