= German Fatherland Party =

Far-right political party in the German Empire

German Fatherland Party Deutsche Vaterlandspartei
- Abbreviation: DVLP
- Chairman: Alfred von Tirpitz
- Deputy Chairman: Wolfgang Kapp
- Founded: 2 September 1917; (Note: Or possibly 3 September, according to historians Jeffery Verhey and Hans-Ulrich Wehler.); Königsberg, East Prussia
- Dissolved: 10 December 1918
- Merged into: DNVP (de facto)
- Headquarters: Berlin W9, Schellingstr. 1 SK (Main Office)
- Newspaper: Mitteilungen der Deutschen Vaterlandspartei
- Think tank: Alldeutscher Verband
- Membership: 1,250,000 (July 1918 est.)
- Ideology: Conservatism (German); Expansionist nationalism; German militarism
- Political position: Far-right
- Colours: Black White Red

The German Fatherland Party (German: Deutsche Vaterlandspartei, abbreviated as DVLP) was a short-lived far-right political party active in the German Empire during the last phase of World War I. It rejected the Reichstag Peace Resolution of July 1917, which called for a negotiated peace without annexations. The Fatherland Party is considered the first attempt at reconciliation and cooperation between the traditional right, characteristic of the Wilhelmine Period, and militant nationalists of the extreme right who would become popular during the interwar period.

== History ==
=== Foundation ===
Backed by the Pan-German League, the German Fatherland Party was founded by Heinrich Claß, August von Dönhoff, Alfred von Tirpitz and Wolfgang Kapp on 2 September 1917. On 9 September, the DVLP made its existence public in newspaper advertisements. The established bourgeois parties reacted inconsistently to the founding of the Fatherland Party. Many conservative parties expressly welcomed them. The board of the National Liberal Party offered to cooperate with the Fatherland Party and left party members the option to join it. The left-liberal Progressive People's Party, which lost a noticeable number of members to the DVLP, expressly refused to work with it. The Catholic Centre Party (Zentrum) told party members on 12 October 1917 not to assist the DVLP.

=== Dissolution ===
The November Revolution effectively ended the existence of the DVLP. Until 28 November, the board met again and agreed to stop all "public activities." Furthermore, the members were asked to agitate for the early convocation of a national assembly, to ensure that the "national forces" were gathered together, and, for the time being, to support the Council of the People's Deputies in "maintaining order." Finally, on 10 December 1918, the Reich Committee of the DVLP, which only about 20 people visited, decided to dissolve the party. On this occasion, a three-member liquidation committee was established, which initiated the transfer of the party's assets to the German National People's Party (DNVP) and became finalized on 1 February 1919.

=== Subsequent influence ===
During World War I, Anton Drexler joined the German Fatherland Party. After the war, he would go on to form a similar organization, the German Workers' Party, which later became the National Socialist German Workers' Party, better known as the Nazi Party, that came to national power in January 1933 under Adolf Hitler. German scholar Dirk Stegmann concluded that the Fatherland Party was pre- or proto-fascist because of Drexler's involvement. It should be considered that many historians challenge this position. In 1997, scholar Heinz Hagenlücke argued that "the party was explicitly founded as a party and not a movement, members reflected the typical picture of high Wilhelmine society in contrast to the lower class organizations of the Weimar Republic, which sociologically reached the lower-middle class, soldiers, and the youth."

== Ideology ==
=== Political positions ===
The Fatherland Party represented pan-German, national liberal, conservative, nationalist, populist, antisemitic and völkisch political circles, united in their opposition against the Reichstag Peace Resolution of July 1917. It played a vital role in the emergence of the stab-in-the-back myth and the defamation of certain politicians as the November Criminals.

The Fatherland Party was decidedly monarchist and supportive of the war efforts of German Emperor Wilhelm II.

Militarism played an essential role in the party. In March–April 1915, Admiral Alfred von Tirpitz stated that the only thing that was keeping Germany from winning the war was the poor leadership of the Chancellor and the Emperor. His solution was a plan in which Bethmann-Hollweg would be sacked, and the office of Chancellor abolished; the Kaiser would "temporarily" abdicate; and Generalfeldmarschall Hindenburg be given the new office of "Dictator of the Reich," concentrating all political and military power into his hands to win the war. These positions continued to receive support from the Fatherland Party. Internally, there were calls for a coup d'etat against the German government, led by Hindenburg and Ludendorff, even against the Emperor if necessary.

Though the Tirpitz plan was not implemented, the very fact it was mooted showed the extent of military dissatisfaction with the existing leadership and the strength of the "state within the state" in that Tirpitz was not punished despite having essentially called for deposing the Emperor. In August 1916, Germany became a de facto military dictatorship under the duumvirate of Generalfeldmarschall Hindenburg and Generalquartiermeister Ludendorff, who ruled Germany until 1918. During the rule of the "silent dictatorship" of Hindenburg and Ludendorff, the German government advocated a set of imperialist war aims calling for the annexation of most of Europe and Africa that in many ways were a prototype for the war aims of the Second World War.

=== Foreign policy objectives ===
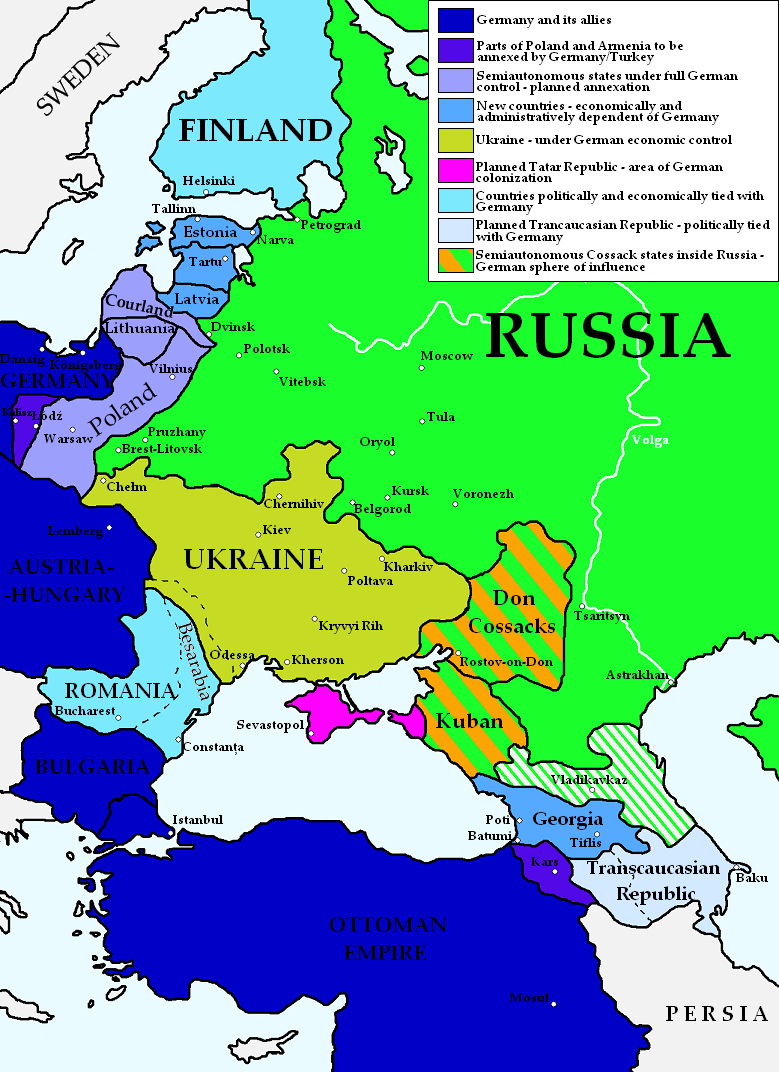
Alleged map of German plans for a new political order in Central and Eastern Europe

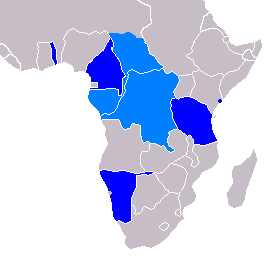
Possible outcome of a German victory in Africa with German pre-WW1 possessions in dark blue and gains in medium blue

The official purpose for the existence of the Fatherland Party was to end the war victoriously and secure a "German peace." On 24 September 1917, Tirpitz had demanded a "correct solution to the Belgian question," a "safeguarding of the open sea lanes," "physical compensation" and a "place in the sun" secured for Germany. In the months that followed, the following ideas gradually emerged:

- Annexation of Luxembourg, Belgium, Briey and the Longwy ore basins
- The Netherlands should be brought into a closer relationship to Germany while avoiding any appearance of coercion (up to annexation)
- Buffer states created in territory carved out of the western Russian Empire, such as Poland and the Baltic states, which would remain under German sovereignty
- The German colonial empire was to be expanded. The German possessions in Africa would be enlarged to create a contiguous German colony across central Africa
- "Freedom of the seas" – in the sense that the German fleet must be able to safeguard "German interests" worldwide
- France must pay a war indemnity of 10 billion German Marks, with further payments to cover veterans' funds and to pay off all of Germany's existing national debt
- France will partially disarm by demolishing its northern forts

The war aims of the DVLP were concerted at every possible opportunity in "countless meetings (...) and a flood of declarations, appeals, writings, demands and telegrams to the Kaiser, the government, the Reichstag, the Supreme Army Command and to the public" became known and popularized. Above all, this should create the impression of a "primitive popular movement."

=== Domestic neutrality ===
In the first few months of its existence, the DVLP repeatedly emphasized its "national" character and its alleged domestic political neutrality. The call to members and supporters, which was still little veiled in the "Great Appeal," to stand up against a Prussian electoral reform, the parliamentarization of Reich policy, and the government's commitment to the DVLP line were deleted on 24 September 1917, without comment. The party promised not to put up its own candidates for Reichstag elections, and the "internal dispute" should rest until the war's end. However, this demonstration of disinterest was merely a tactical tool that arose from the DVLP's political concept. The main domestic political goal of the party leadership was clearly to force a dissolution of the Reichstag by employing extra-parliamentary pressure. This was justified with a populist and pseudo-democratic argument that parliament no longer portrayed the "will of the people."

== Organization ==
=== Leadership ===
The party's leaders were Wolfgang Kapp – who would later play a key role in the failed coup in 1920 known as the Kapp Putsch – and Admiral Alfred von Tirpitz, a naval minister and post-war party leader. Walter Nicolai, head of the military secret service, was also supportive. Media baron Alfred Hugenberg was also a prominent member and Duke John Albert of Mecklenburg was made "Honorary Chairman". The party included many leading industrialists, large landowners, and business association officials, including Georg Wilhelm von Siemens, Carl Duisberg, Ernst von Borsig, Hugo Stinnes, Emil Kirdorf and Hermann Röchling, but also humanities scholars such as Eduard Meyer.

The Fatherland Party held two congresses (on 24 September 1917 and 19 April 1918 in Berlin). The statute did not provide a delegation procedure, and every party member could participate in the party congresses, which were purely forums for acclamation. The Select Committee called a party congress. In addition, there was a Reich Committee composed of the Executive Board, the Select Committee, and 50 individuals to be determined by the party congress, but only met three times. In addition to Tirpitz, Johann Albrecht and Kapp, the DVLP board of directors was made up of the following people: Gottfried Traub, August Rumpf, Heinrich Beythien, Carl Pfeiffer, Lambert Brockmann, Wilhelm von Siemens, Dietrich Schäfer, Franz von Reichenau, Ernst Schweckendieck, Otto Hoffmann, Ulrich von Hassell and Stephan von Nieber. The party executive of the DVLP had a powerful, almost independent position – it could not be changed from within the party and chose new members if necessary. Decisions were made in small groups; according to the statute, the committee had a quorum when two (from April 1918 three) members were present. The Select Committee, abolished in April 1918, later included the eight people appointed in September 1917.

=== Source of funding ===
The party's political influence peaked in the summer of 1918 when it had around 1,250,000 members. Close ties existed between the Fatherland Party and the Supreme Army Command (Oberste Heeresleitung) with the military providing the party's main source of funding and featuring statements from the party in the military's official publication Militär-Wochenblatt. Many former officers joined the DVLP; those on active duty were not permitted to participate in any political party. The party was officially dissolved during the German Revolution on 10 December 1918. Most of its members later joined the German National People's Party (DNVP), the major national-conservative party in Germany during the Weimar Republic. Before the rise of the Nazi Party, it was the major conservative and nationalist party in Weimar Germany.

Head of the noticeably large head office of the party with its last nine departments and up to 137 employees were (one after the other) Kapp's close confidants Georg Wilhelm Schiele, Franz Ferdinand Eiffe, and Konrad Scherer. Huge sums of money were incurred for the maintenance and activities of the DVLP party apparatus, which were completely unusual for other contemporary parties. In addition, the party gave the bulk of its literature and other propaganda material completely free of charge. This effort could not possibly be covered only by membership fees and occasional donations. In the spring of 1918 alone, the sum of the initially uncovered expenses averaged 142,000 marks per month.

In addition to the support from the Pan-German League, the Fatherland Party also received additional support from a number of nationalist organizations and pressure groups. Among them were the German Eastern Marches Society, German Navy League, German Colonial Society, German Anti-Semitic Organization and the Defence League. These organizations became collectively known as the nationale Verbände.

=== Party infrastructure ===
The DVLP had its central main management based in Berlin and was divided into state, district, and local associations at the middle and lower levels. The Berlin headquarters of the DVLP employed almost 150 members at the end of 1917. According to the statutes, the state, district, and local associations were set up as required. The local associations could only communicate with the party executive through the state associations. District associations were only to be interposed when needed; they had no members and only served the regional associations as administrative bodies. In July 1918, 32 state associations, 237 district associations, and 2,536 local associations across Germany.

=== Membership ===
According to its own information, the DVLP had 450,000 members in March 1918, 1,250,000 in July, and 800,000 in September. However, these numbers are considered highly exaggerated. At least, very likely, but more than half of the members belonged to "patriotic" clubs and associations affiliated with the Fatherland Party. It is also known that several higher officials – including Prussian government presidents – forced the staff of the departments and authorities they headed to join the party. The party tried harder to attract workers, especially after the January strike. A guideline for party speakers had previously stated that the worker "must gain the understanding that he is serving himself by joining our party; because our party especially serves the welfare of the workers by advocating a peace that secures our economic future." As early as January 1918, the party officially claimed to have over 290,000 "registered workers" in its ranks.
