= Sammlungspolitik =

Policy of Kaiser Wilhelm II

Sammlungspolitik was the term for a domestic policy of Kaiser Wilhelm II during his rule in Germany. It means bringing together policy and its promoters aimed to unite the political parties and groups in favour of Weltpolitik (policy involving navy and colonial expansion) and also diminishing the Sozialdemokratische Partei Deutschlands (SPD), which other parties pretended to take seriously as a revolutionary socialist party. Most parties supported Weltpolitik but in 1909 the navy budget became controversial. Instead of choosing to tax the rich, the government chose to increase sales tax (increasing the price of goods), which led to its sudden loss of support from parties like the Deutsche Zentrumspartei and the Liberals. In 1912 election, the SPD gained 112 seats, making it the largest party in the Reichstag.

== Structuralist ==
The Structuralist school of thought, led by Hans-Ulrich Wehler (who described Weltpolitik as the "manipulation process"), argued that Germany was not really controlled by the Kaiser but by the influence of four main groups in Germany, the Junkers (landowners), the army, industrialists and right wing pressure groups.

== Junkers ==
Junker influence had an institutional base in the Agrarian League (est. 1893). The Prussian electoral system favoured them and allowed them to control the government of Prussia. As Prussia was the largest state in the Empire, more Prussians were elected into the Bundesrat and these were mainly Junker. The Prussian Junkers held 17 seats in the Bundesrat and 14 votes were needed for a veto. This gave them power in the Bundesrat. They used this power to block reforms that did not benefit them and to protect the interests of agriculture.

== Army ==
The Army League of 1912 was created to advance the interests of the army and the part of the economy dependent on it. They exploited this to get 'favours' and as the Kaiser was head of the army a position he took very seriously and was obsessed by them, he filled the court with generals. It has been suggested by historians that during 1914 the army leaders had more influence than the Chancellor. The army used its influence to apply pressure on the Reichstag to pass the army bills of 1912 to 1913.

== Industrialists ==
The Pan German League of 1891 tried to gain support for Wilhelm's Weltpolitik as a means of securing markets for Germany's manufactures and sources of raw materials. Their fear of socialism bound them to Weltpolitik as they hoped that the appeal to German nationalism would divert support from Socialism.

== Right-Wing Pressure Groups ==
The Kaiser had a strong right-wing viewpoint due to his obsession with the army, which these groups could exploit to get their own views across.
