= Alfred Wysocki =

Polish lawyer and diplomat

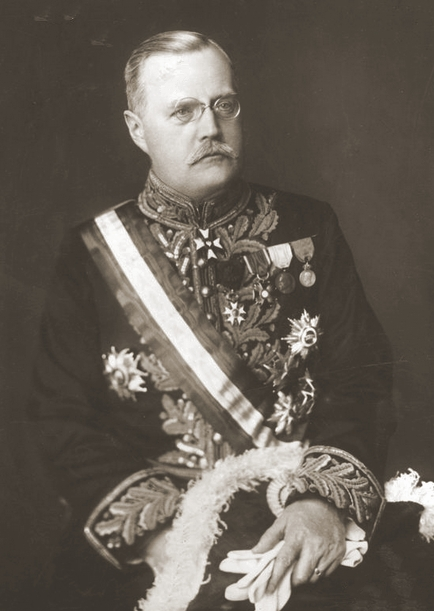
Alfred Wysocki

Alfred Wysocki (26 August 1873 - 3 September 1959) – was a Polish lawyer and diplomat. He was ambassador of Poland to Sweden (1924-1928), Germany (1931-1933) and Rome (1933-1938). In the years 1938-1939 he was a senator.

== Life ==
In the late nineteenth and early twentieth century he was a journalist of Gazeta Lwowska and also a member of the Young Polish Bohemian in Lwów.

In 1919-1920 he was Polish deputation councilor and chargé d'affaires in Prague, then in Berlin. In 1922-1923 he was general inspector of a Polish consular office in Paris.

From 1928 to 1931 he was Deputy Minister of Foreign Affairs. He was a Polish senator in 1938-1939. He stayed in Warsaw during the German occupation of Poland in the Second World War.

He was awarded the Grand Cross of the Order of Christ (1931). On November 10, 1938 Wysocki was awarded the great sash of the Order of Polonia Restituta for "outstanding achievements in government service."
