= Schlesische Zeitung =

Newspaper in Prussia and the German Reich

The Schlesische Zeitung (Silesian Newspaper) was a newspaper in Prussia and the German Reich. It was founded in 1742 and ceased publication in 1945.

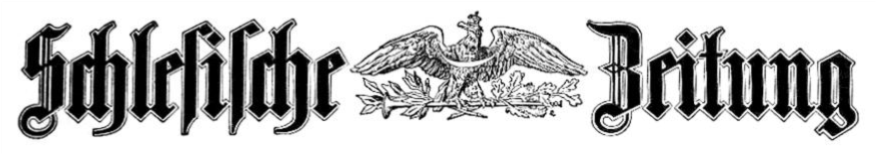
Schlesische Zeitung

It was founded in 1742 by the Breslau publisher and bookseller Johann Jacob Korn (1702–1756). Korn was granted the newspaper concession by Frederick II of Prussia after Prussia seized power in Silesia. The paper and the publishing house were continued by his son Wilhelm Gottlieb Korn (1739–1806). On 3 January 1742, Korn published a new newspaper under the title Schlesischer Nouvellen-Couriter.

In 1848 the paper's title was changed to Schlesische Zeitung. Korn's publishing house has continued in Germany under the name Bergstadtverlag Wilhelm Gottlieb Korn. It is now based in Görlitz and has produced the Schlesien Heute (Silesia Today) magazine since 1998.
