= Shell Chemicals =

Petrochemicals division of Shell plc

- Company type: Division
- Industry: Petrochemical
- Headquarters: Houston, United States
- Parent: Shell plc
- Website: shell.com/chemicals

Shell Chemicals is the petrochemicals arm of Shell plc. The name "Shell Chemicals" refers to the nearly seventy companies engaged in chemicals businesses for Shell, which together make up one of the largest petrochemical producers in the world. The company has a wide range of products that include acetone, aromatics, ethylene oxide, ethylene glycols, alkenes, nonene, phenol, polyethylene, polyols, and solvents.

== History ==
Shell companies first entered the chemicals industry in 1929, via a partnership with Koninklijke Nederlandsche Hoogovens en Staalfabrieken in the Netherlands called NV Mekog, which manufactured ammonia from coke-oven gas produced at the steelworks in IJmuiden. Meanwhile, in the United States, the Shell Chemical Company (founded 1929) began the world's first production of ammonia from natural gas in California in 1931. It also started production of chemical solvents from refinery gases in California during the early 1930s, while in 1942, it pioneered the production of butadiene, a key raw material for synthetic rubbers. In 1941, production of Teepol liquid detergent began at Stanlow in the UK, the first manufacture of a petroleum-based organic chemical in Europe. Throughout the years as Shell Chemicals business grows inline with the Oil and Gas segment, many plants were set up globally. The Teepol brand is now manufactured in different counterparts globally. Among them are Teepol Products UK based at Orpington in Greater London and Teepol Malaysia based at Klang in Malaysia. From there it is sold worldwide. In the decades that have followed, Shell Chemicals companies have been significant players in the growth of the global petrochemicals sector and have developed some of its key manufacturing processes.

== Portfolio of businesses ==
The Shell Chemicals portfolio is focused on six product businesses and two international joint ventures. It includes the operation a number of large-scale plants that produce high volume products. The companies included in Shell Chemicals employ around 8,500 people worldwide.

== Key manufacturing locations ==
Shell Chemicals companies source product from manufacturing facilities around the world. Some of these facilities are operated by Shell Chemicals companies, some by other businesses within the Shell Group and others by joint ventures in which Shell holds varying levels of investment. Currently, Shell Chemicals companies' main manufacturing locations for petrochemical building blocks are:

- Moerdijk/Pernis, The Netherlands
- Stanlow, UK
- Deer Park, USA
- Geismar, USA
- Mobile, USA
- Norco, USA
- Scotford, Canada
- Jurong Island/Pulau Bukom, Singapore
- Klang, Malaysia (Note: joint venture between Shell Chemicals and Tabung Haji Sdn Bhd.)
