= Hoesch =

Hoesch may refer to

- Hoesch AG, a former German manufacturer with steel and benzol-oil plants
- Leopold Hoesch(1820–1899), founder of the 1871 Hoesch AG iron and steel plant in Dortmund
- Leopold von Hoesch (1881–1936), a career German diplomat
- Leopold Hoesch (*1969), is a German film producer
