= Gunawan =

Gunawan is a common Indonesian surname from Sanskrit (meaning virtuous), its also a localized version of some Chinese surnames such as Guo (郭) and Wu (吳) and it may refer to:

People

- Indra Gunawan (disambiguation)
- Henricus Pidyarto Gunawan, Indonesian Roman Catholic bishop
- Raden Goenawan, Indonesian Prosecutor General 1959–62
- Rudy Gunawan, Chinese Indonesian badminton player
- Tony Gunawan, Indonesian-born badminton player of Chinese descent

Other

- Gunawan Steel Group, Indonesian steel company group

== See also ==
- Gunavantha, a 2007 Indian film
- Gunavanthudu, a 1975 Indian film by Adurthi Subba Rao
