= Estel (disambiguation) =

Estel may refer to:

People

- Estel Wood "Ed" Kelley, founder of Steak 'n Shake restaurant chain
- Estel Tessmer, football and basketball player
- Estel Crabtree, baseball player

Other

- Estel (middle earth name), a name in J.R.R. Tolkien's Middle-earth fantasy universe
- Star in Catalan
- Estel, Dutch-German steel company
