= Hannie Bruinsma-Kleijwegt =

Dutch politician (1936–2021)

Mayor of Zaanstad
- In office 28 February 1992 – 1996
- Preceded by: Hans Ouwerkerk
- Succeeded by: Theo Quené

Personal details
- Born: 14 July 1936 Nij Beets, Netherlands
- Died: 21 February 2021 (aged 84) Drachten, Netherlands
- Party: Pacifist Socialist Party (until 1968); Labour Party (after 1968)

Johanna "Hannie" Bruinsma-Kleijwegt (14 July 1936 – 21 February 2021) was a Dutch politician. She was a member of the municipal council for Dongeradeel and the Provincial Council of Friesland. Between 1992 and 1996, she was the mayor of Zaanstad. She was a member of the Labour Party.

== Early life ==
Bruinsma-Kleijwegt was born on 14 July 1936 in Nij Beets. Her father was a teacher and a co-founder of the Labour Party (PvdA) in Friesland and her uncle, Cors Kleijwegt, was one of the national co-founders of the party. She had two younger siblings: Dineke van As-Kleijwegt, who later became mayor of Assen, and Corstiaan Kleijwegt, who later became mayor of Sliedrecht and Hellevoetsluis. She studied chemistry after high school and began working in laboratories for Mekog in IJmuiden and Caltex in Pernis. She married Jasper Bruinsma, a general practitioner, and the couple moved to Ee.

== Political career ==
Bruinsma-Kleijwegt initially joined the Pacifist Socialist Party. She switched parties to the PvdA in 1968 as a result of the influence of Joop den Uyl. She was initially elected to the municipal council for Dongeradeel as a member of the PvdA in 1970 and later became a member of the Provincial Council of Friesland. She was a member of the executive between 1981 and 1991 with responsibility for public health and social work and transport and public works. She was the first female deputy in Friesland.

She was appointed mayor of Zaanstad on 28 February 1992 to succeed Hans Ouwerkerk. She struggled with the administrative culture in the town, which revolved around six aldermen. She had conflicts with the city clerk and the police chief; a comment about the latter led to a vote of no confidence which she narrowly won. She ultimately resigned from the position in 1996.

She died in Drachten on 21 February 2021 at the age of 84.
