= Leopold Hoesch =

Leopold Hoesch may refer to:

- Leopold Hoesch (film producer) (born 1969), German film producer
- Leopold Hoesch (entrepreneur), German entrepreneur

== See also ==
- Leopold von Hoesch (1881–1936), German diplomat
