= Tengelmann =

Tengelmann may refer to:

- Tengelmann Group, a holding company based in Mülheim an der Ruhr, Germany
- Ernst Tengelmann (1870 - 1954), German entrepreneur
