= Hannie =

Hannie is a feminine given name. Notable people with the surname include:

== People ==
- Hannie Bal, Dutch painter
- Hannie Bloemhof (born 1936), Dutch sprinter
- Hannie Bruinsma-Kleijwegt, Dutch politician
- Hannie van Leeuwen, Dutch politician
- Hannie Lips, Dutch broadcaster
- Hannie Mein, Dutch ceramist
- Hannie Rayson, Australian playwright and newspaper columnist
- Hannie Rouweler, Dutch poet
- Hannie Schaft, Dutch resistance fighter
- Hannie Singer-Dekker, Dutch politician
- Hannie Termeulen (1929–2001), Dutch swimmer

== Fictional characters ==
- Hannie Caulder, eponymous protagonist of the 1971 British Western film Hannie Caulder
