= Friedrich Springorum =

German entrepreneur and engineer

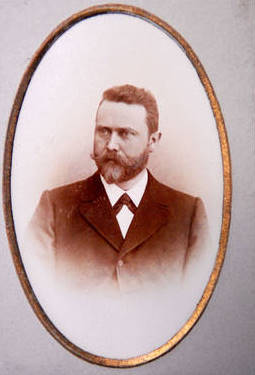
Friedrich Springorum

Friedrich Springorum (1 April 1858 in Schwelm – 16 May 1938 in Dortmund) was a German engineer and entrepreneur.

== Biography ==
From 1908 to 1921, Friedrich Springorum became general director and sole board member of Hoesch AG. Springorum was also a co-founder of the Society of Friends and Sponsors of RWTH Aachen e. V. (ProRWTH), which has been awarding the Springorum commemorative coin since 1925.

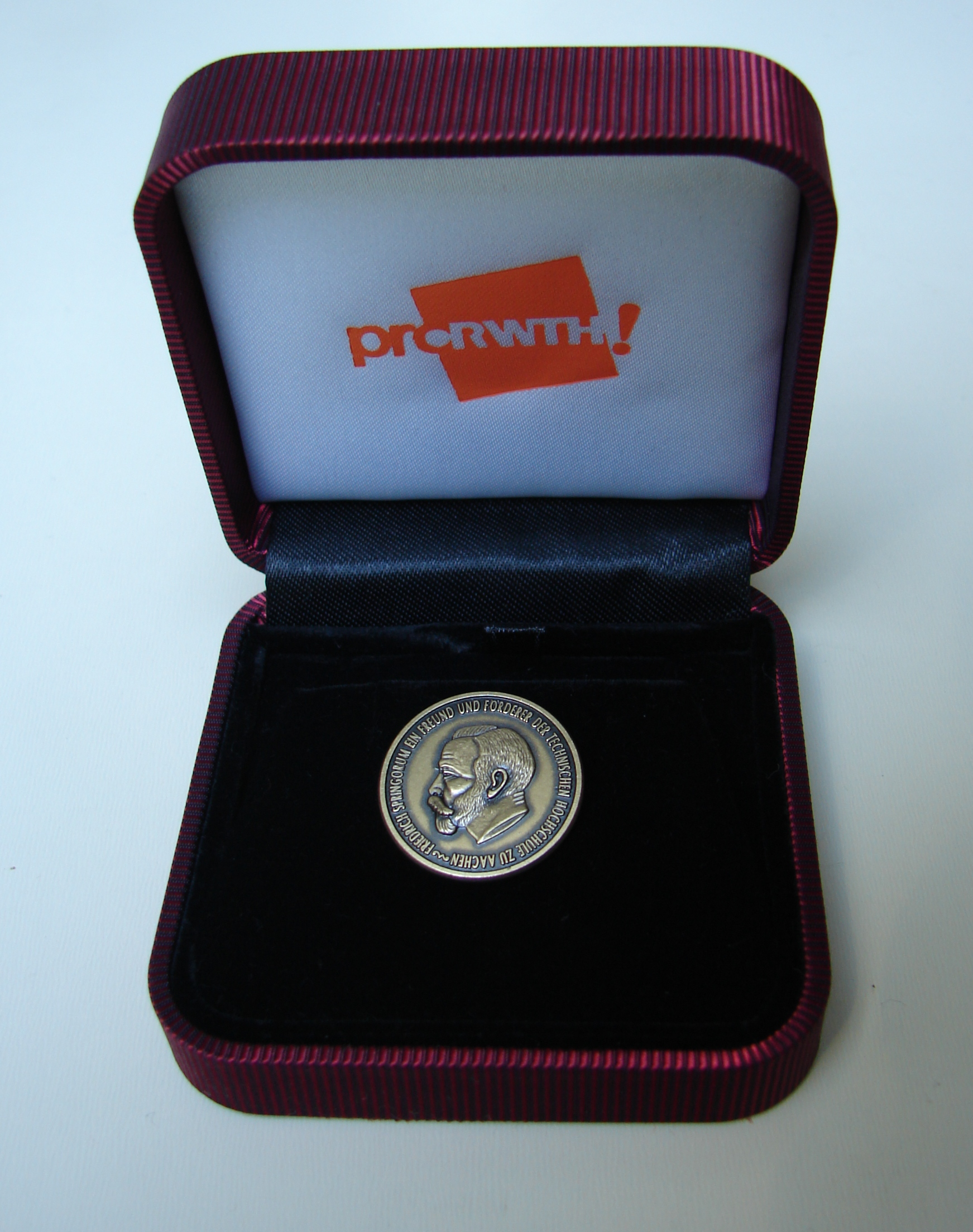
Springorum commemorative coin

On 24 October 1920, Springorum was awarded honorary citizenship by the RWTH Aachen. He was also awarded the title of a council of commerce and received an honorary doctorate from the TH Breslau and University of Leeds. Springorum was also politically active and was a member of the city council of Dortmund. Springorum was married. His sons were Fritz Springorum (1886-1942) and Otto Springorum (1890-1955).

== Publications ==
- Springorum, Friedrich. In: Robert Volz: Reich Handbook of German Society. The handbook of personalities in words and pictures. Volume 2: L-Z. Deutscher Wirtschaftsverlag, Berlin 1931, DNB 453960294, pp. 1814-1815.
- Walter Bertram: Friedrich Springorum (1858-1938). In: Rheinisch-Westfälische *Wirtschaftsbiographien, Volume V. Aschendorff, Münster 1953, pp. 122–146.
- Karl-Peter Ellerbrock: Springorum, Friedrich. In: New German Biography (NDB). Volume 24, Duncker & Humblot, Berlin 2010, ISBN 978-3-428-11205-0, p. 763 f. (Digitized).

== See also ==
- Hoesch AG
