= Hoogovensmuseum =

Coordinates: 52°28′19″N 4°37′25″E

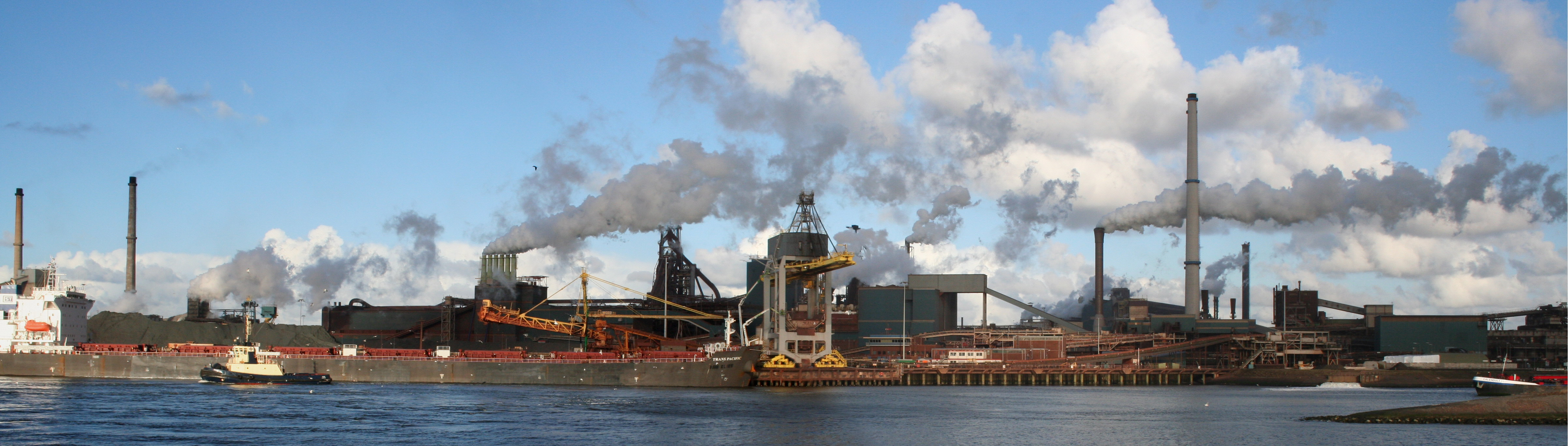
The factory of the former Koninklijke Hoogovens, today part of Tata Steel Netherlands

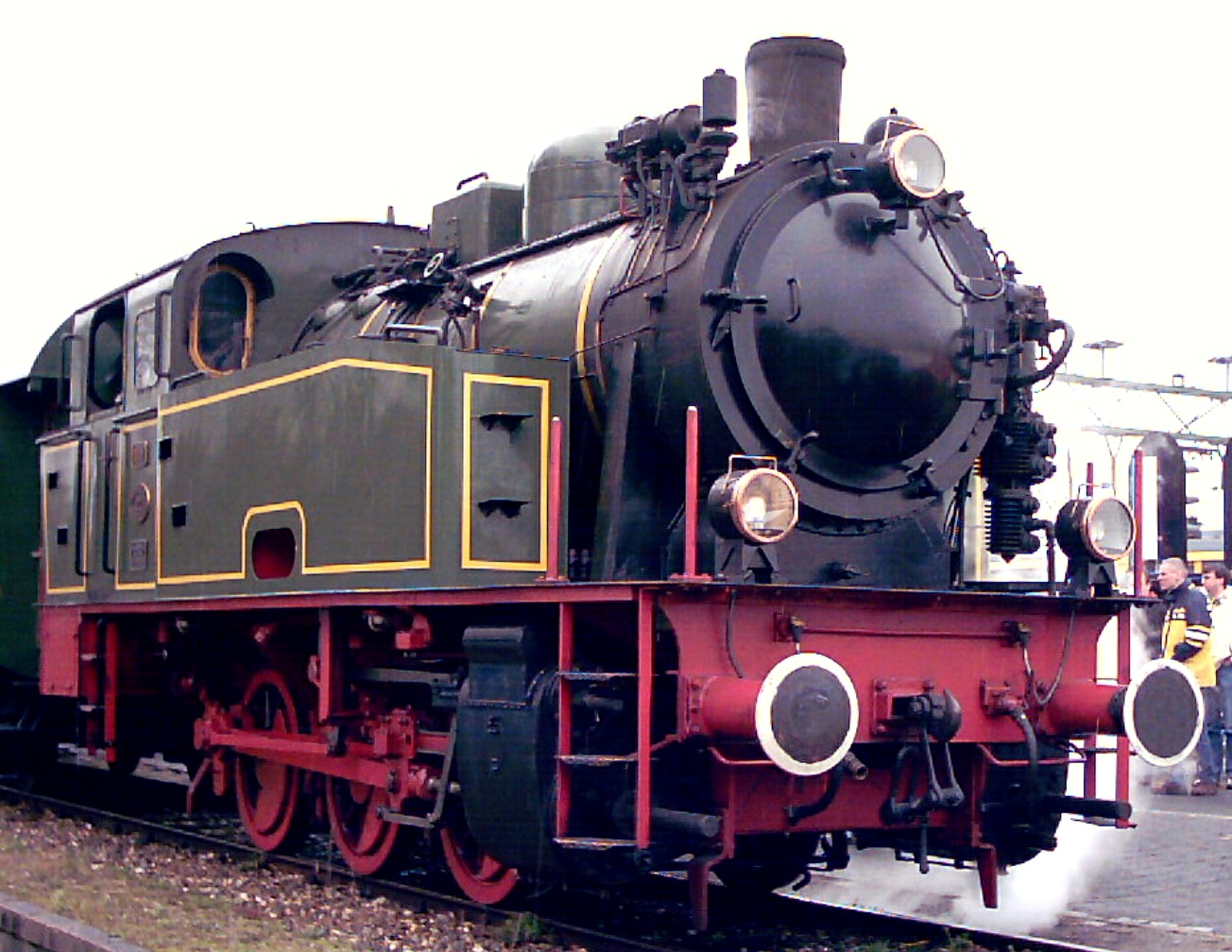
Corus Steam train

The Hoogovensmuseum is a museum located on the northern side of the North Sea Canal sluice gates at IJmuiden, in the former "buizengieterij" (pipe making factory) of Koninklijke Hoogovens, now Tata Steel IJmuiden, on the Buizenweg in Velsen-Noord. It overlooks the binnenkanaal where water was pumped up to use for cooling. The former cooling bath house has been converted to an exhibition space.

== History ==
The museum was opened in 2009 by the Stichting Industrieel Erfgoed Hoogovens (SIEHO) in order to preserve the industrial heritage of this historic steel producing site. The museum is sponsored by the current owner, Tata Steel.

The museum is open Tuesdays and Thursdays from 10:00 to 16:00. It is also open whenever the Corus Steam train is running. Admission is 5 euros (children under 16 free). Group tours can be booked on request. Parking is available in front of the museum, but it is also listed on the "Holland Route", a bicycling tour of Industrial monuments in the greater Amsterdam area.
