= Velsen-Noord =

- Village
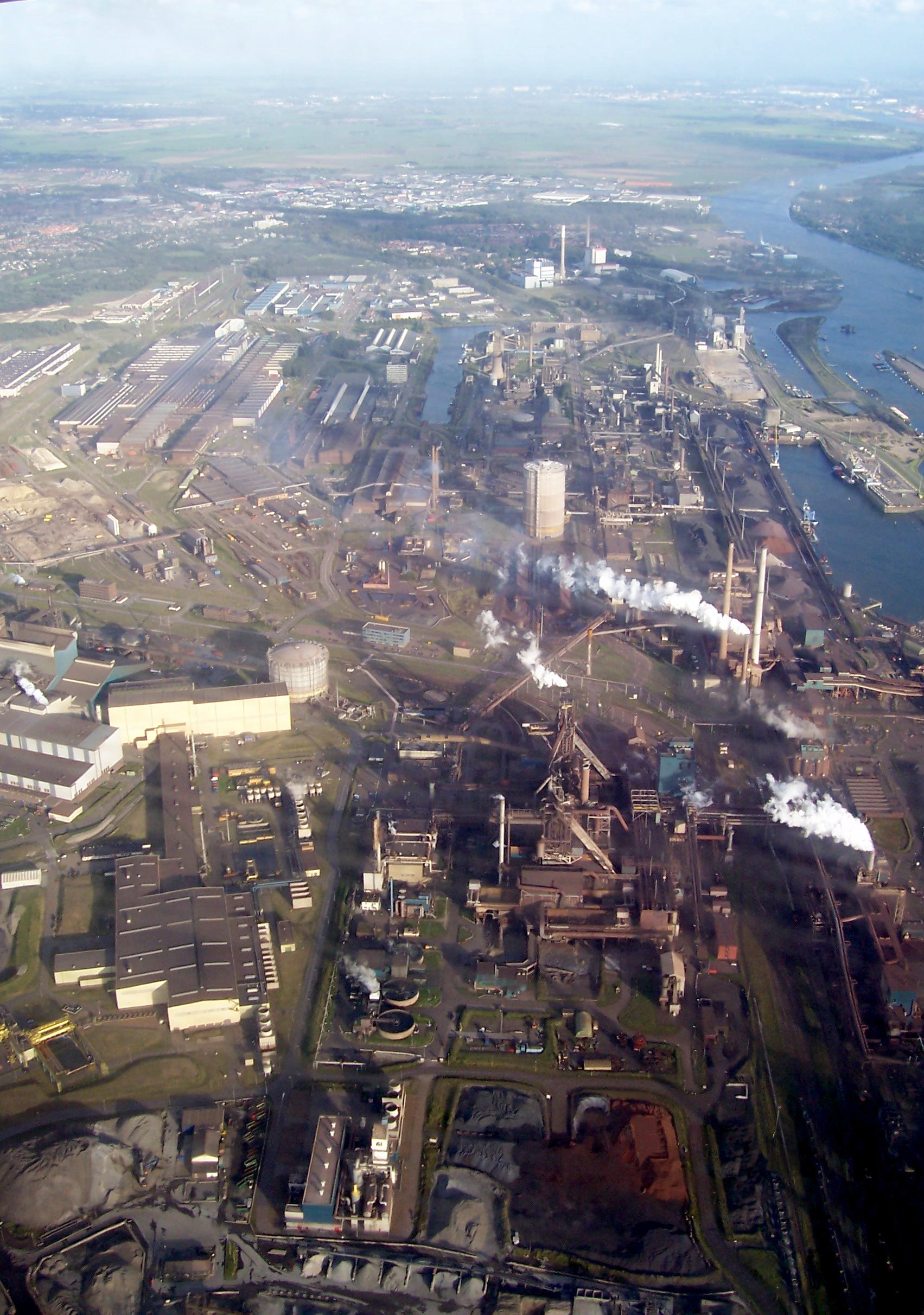
- Steel works

- Location in the Netherlands Location in the province of North Holland in the Netherlands
- Coordinates: 52°28′20″N 4°38′39″E
- Country: Netherlands
- Province: North Holland
- Municipality: Velsen

Area
  - Total: 9.51 km^{2} (3.67 sq mi)
- Elevation: 1.1 m (3.6 ft)

Population (2021)
  - Total: 5,280
  - Density: 555/km^{2} (1,440/sq mi)
- Time zone: UTC+1 (CET)
  - Summer (DST): UTC+2 (CEST)
- Postal code: 1951
- Dialing code: 0251

Velsen-Noord (Dutch pronunciation: [ˌvɛlzə ˈnoːrt]) is a village in the Dutch province of North Holland. It is a part of the municipality of Velsen, and lies about 10 km north of Haarlem.

From 1865 on, when the construction on the North Sea Canal began, the town of Velsen, which originated in Roman times, was split in two parts. The northern part was known as Wijkeroog. Circa 1920, when municipality Beverwijk was planning to annex its surrounding villages, Velsen renamed Wijkeroog to Velsen-Noord (and Velsen itself to Velsen-Zuid) to indicate clearly that it was part of the municipality.

In 1918, the steel producer Koninklijke Hoogovens was established in Velsen-Noord along the North Sea Canal. Its blast furnaces have defined the landscape of this town since then. The Hoogovensmuseum was opened in 2009 by the Stichting Industrieel Erfgoed Hoogovens (SIEHO) in order to preserve the industrial heritage of this historic steel producing site.
