= Hans Louis Ferdinand von Löwenstein zu Löwenstein =

German politician

- Born: 9 January 1874; Hanover, German Empire
- Died: 14 February 1959; Zürich, Switzerland
- Education: University of Marburg; Clausthal University of Technology
- Occupation(s): miner, politician
- Spouse: Freda von Arnim-Suckow
- Children: 2
- Parent(s): Otto von Loewenstein zu Loewenstein; Emma von Dehn-Rothfelser

Hans Louis Ferdinand von Löwenstein zu Löwenstein (9 January 1874 – 14 February 1959) was a German mining official, politician and Reichstag deputy.

== Biography ==
Löwenstein was born on 9 January 1874 to Otto von Loewenstein zu Loewenstein and Emma von Dehn-Rothfelser in Hanover.

The son of an officer, he attended schools in Gießen and Marburg before studying mining science at the University of Marburg and the Clausthal University of Technology. He went to work as a referendary in 1897 before becoming an assessor in 1901, eventually becoming an important figure in the running of mines around Dortmund and ultimately nationally.

In 1908 he married Freda von Arnim-Suckow, a daughter of the military officer Theodor von Arnim-Suckow.

In 1919 Löwenstein joined the right-wing Wirtschaftsvereinigung zur Förderung der geistigen Wiederaufbaukräfte, a group that was absorbed into the German National People's Party (DNVP). He also participated in the Harzburg Front in 1931. In 1931 he joined Gesellschaft zum Studium des Faschismus, a group that linked conservatism in Germany with the Nazi Party. He also attended the Secret Meeting of 20 February 1933 when up to 25 figures from industry met Adolf Hitler to discuss financing the Nazis' election campaign.

The Law Against the Formation of Parties of July 1933 banned all political parties except the Nazi Party. At the November 1933 election, Löwenstein was elected to the Reichstag from electoral constituency 23, Düsseldorf West, as a "guest" of the Nazi Party. He was reelected at the March 1936 election and retained his seat until the 1938 election when he retired.

Löwenstein died in Zürich in 1959.

== Bibliography ==
- Erwin Dickhoff: Essener Köpfe - wer war was?. Verlag Richard Bracht, Essen 1985 – ISBN 3-87034-037-1
- Erich Stockhorst: 5000 Köpfe – Wer war was im Dritten Reich. Arndt, Kiel 2000, ISBN 3-88741-116-1.
