= Fritz Springorum =

German businessman and politician (1886–1942)

Chairman, Supervisory Board Hoesch AG (Also General Director since 1925)
- In office 1937–1939

Chairman, Association of German Steel Manufacturers
- In office 1936–1939

Reichstag Deputy
- In office 12 November 1933 – 16 April 1942

City Councilor, Dortmund
- In office 1924–1942

Personal details
- Born: Friedrich Springorum; 6 June 1886 Ruhrort, Rhine Province, Kingdom of Prussia, German Empire
- Died: 16 April 1942 (aged 55) Duisburg, Nazi Germany
- Party: German National People's Party
- Other political affiliations: Nazi Party
- Education: Doctor of Engineering
- Alma mater: RWTH Aachen University; Humboldt University of Berlin
- Occupation: Engineer; Business executive

Fritz Springorum (6 June 1886 – 16 April 1942) was a German engineer, business executive and politician. He worked for over two decades in leading positions at Hoesch AG, a large steel and mining conglomerate, and rose to become the chairman of its supervisory board. He was politically active in the Weimar Republic as a member of the conservative German National People's Party. Though he initially was not a supporter Adolf Hitler, after the Nazi seizure of power, he served as a deputy in the Reichstag from 1933 until his death, and joined the Nazi Party in 1937.

== Early life and education ==
Springorum was born in Ruhrort, a borough of Duisburg, the son of Friedrich Springorum, the general director of Hoesch AG, a German steel and mining conglomerate in Dortmund. He obtained his Abitur from the Stadtgymnasium Dortmund and then studied metallurgy at the RWTH Aachen University. In 1904, he became a member of the Academic Association Montania, later the Corps Montania Aachen, whose professional association he headed from 1920 to 1933. He completed his studies and earned an engineering degree in 1908. He also spent some time studying in Great Britain and Belgium. He next worked as an operations assistant in 1909 at Deutsch-Luxemburgische Bergwerks- und Hütten-AG, a large mining concern in Differdange. He then studied economics and public finance at the Humboldt University of Berlin and became a Doctor of Engineering in 1910.

== Leading industrialist ==
Springorum worked as an engineer at United States Steel in New York from 1910 to 1911. From 1911 to 1915, he was the chief engineer and head of the steelworks of Gelsenkirchener Bergwerks-AG near Esch-sur-Alzette in Luxembourg. From 1915, he worked at Hoesch AG in Dortmund, initially as plant manager, from 1917 as steelworks director, in 1925 as general director in succession to his father, from 1932 as general director and chairman of the Vorstand (management board), and from 1937 as chairman of the supervisory board. Springorum also served from as the chairman of the Langnam-Verein, an association for the support of common economic interests in the Rhineland and Westphalia and of the northwestern regional group of the Association of German Steel Manufacturers (VDEh). He was also the treasurer of the Ruhrlade, an association of the twelve most influential industrialists in the Ruhr.

== Political activity in the Weimar Republic ==
During the Weimar Republic, Springorum was a member of the nationalist, conservative and anti-republican German National People's Party (DNVP). From 1924 to 1930, he was an elected city councilor in Dortmund. Supporting private sector capitalism during the difficult economic crisis of the early 1930s, he helped raise contributions of 1.5 million Reichsmark annually to support the conservative bourgeois parties. In the autumn of 1932, Adolf Hitler's Nazi Party was having difficulty raising funds for the upcoming electoral campaign. Big businessmen and financiers, increasingly concerned about the growing radicalism of the Nazis, were lining up behind the government of Chancellor Franz von Papen. Joseph Goebbels, the Nazi propaganda chief, lamented the Nazis' financial difficulties in his diary entry of 15 October 1932: "Money is extraordinarily hard to obtain. All the gentlemen of 'Property and Education' are standing by the government". Together with over 330 other industrialists and bankers, Springorum signed an appeal entitled "With Paul von Hindenburg for the people and the Reich!" on the eve of the 6 November 1932 parliamentary election. It endorsed a vote for the DNVP, supported Papen's cabinet and thus clearly opposed the Nazis.

The election was a mixed result for Hitler, with the Nazis remaining the largest party in the Reichstag, though losing some seats. Wilhelm Keppler, Hitler's economic advisor, arranged for twenty pro-Nazi businessmen to submit a petition to President Hindenburg on 19 November urging that he appoint Hitler as chancellor. Other than Fritz Thyssen, a steel magnate and a long-time Nazi sympathizer, most were middle-ranking businessmen and landowners. Other large key industrialists, including Springorum, still withheld their support and preferred to see a continuation of the Papen government.

== Nazi Party supporter ==
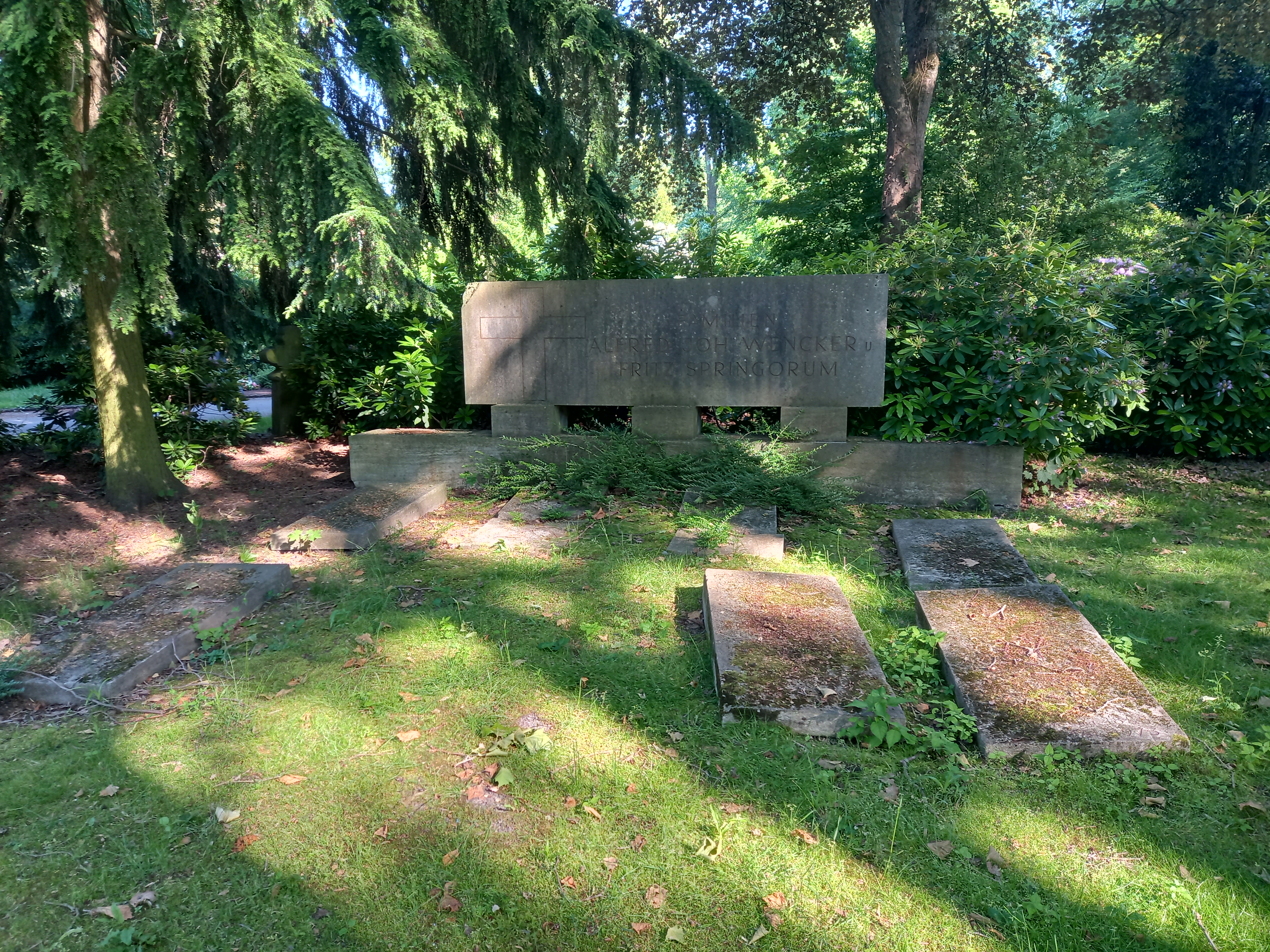
The grave of Fritz Springorum and his wife Clara at the Südwestfriedhof in Dortmund

However, after Adolf Hitler was appointed as chancellor on 30 January 1933, Springorum moved closer to the Nazi government. Three weeks later, he took part in the meeting of 25 leading industrialists with Hitler and supported the Nazi campaign for the parliamentary election of 5 March 1933 with a personal donation of 36,000 Reichsmark. When the Nazis deposed the managing director of the Langnam-Verein in April 1933 as part of their Gleichschaltung campaign, Springorum voluntarily left his position as chairman and the association soon was dissolved.

Springorum was appointed as a member of Hans Frank's Academy for German Law, and also was appointed as a Ratsherr (municipal council member) in Dortmund from 1933 onward. He was elected as a deputy of the Reichstag at the next parliamentary election on 12 November 1933 from electoral constituency 17 (Westphalia North). Since the DNVP had dissolved itself in June 1933, he was admitted as a "guest" of the Nazi parliamentary faction. Springorum was formally admitted to the Nazi Party on 1 May 1937 (membership number 4,569,841) and he remained a member of the Nazi parliamentary faction until his death.

Springorum succeeded Albert Vögler as the national chairman of the Association of German Steel Manufacturers (VDEh) in 1936, but resigned due to illness in 1939. He was also a member of the supervisory board of the Rhenish-Westphalian Coal Syndicate and the advisory board of the Trustee of Labour for the Economic Area of Westphalia. Springorum died in Duisburg in April 1942.

== Sources ==
- Information about Fritz Springorum in the Reichstag database
- Karl-Peter Ellerbrock (2010): Springorum, Fritz in the Deutsche Biographie
- Kershaw, Ian (2008). Hitler: A Biography. W.W. Norton & Co. ISBN 978-0-393-33761-7.
- Lilla, Joachim; Doring, Martin; Schulz, Andreas (2004). Statisten in Uniform: Die Mitglieder des Reichstags 1933–1945. Ein biographisches Handbuch. Unter Einbeziehung der völkischen und nationalsozialistischen Reichstagsabgeordneten ab Mai 1924. Düsseldorf: Droste. ISBN 978-3-770-05254-7.
- Shirer, William L. (1960). The Rise and Fall of the Third Reich. New York: Simon & Schuster. LCCN 60-6729.
- Stockhorst, Erich (1985). 5000 Köpfe: Wer War Was im 3. Reich. Arndt. ISBN 978-3-887-41116-9.
- Turner, Henry Ashby Jr. (1985). German Big Business and the Rise of Hitler. Oxford University Press. ISBN 978-0-195-03492-9.
