= Ludwig Grauert =

German lawyer, businessman and Nazi official (1891–1964)

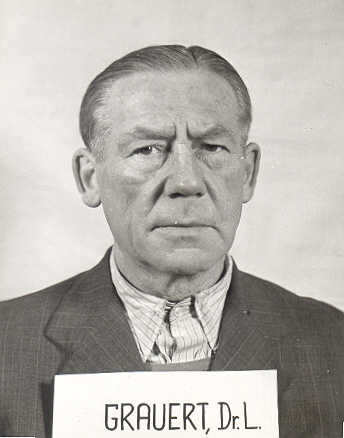
- Grauert as a witness during the Nuremberg Trials (1946)

State Secretary Prussian and Reich Ministry of the Interior
- In office 1 November 1934 – 30 June 1936
- Preceded by: Position created

State Secretary Prussian Ministry of the Interior
- In office 11 April 1933 – 1 November 1934
- Preceded by: Erich Klausener
- Succeeded by: Position abolished

Personal details
- Born: 9 January 1891 Münster, Province of Westphalia, Kingdom of Prussia, German Empire
- Died: 4 June 1964 (aged 73) Cologne, North Rhine Westphalia, West Germany
- Party: Nazi Party
- Other political affiliations: Conservative People's Party
- Education: University of Münster; Ludwig-Maximilians-Universität München
- Profession: Lawyer

Military service
- Allegiance: German Empire; Nazi Germany
- Branch/service: Imperial German Army; Luftwaffe
- Years of service: 1914–1918; 1939–1945
- Rank: Leutnant; Oberst
- Unit: 4th (Westphalian) Cuirassiers "von Driesen"; 15th Reserve Infantry Regiment
- Commands: Luftwaffe Flak Regiment 123
- Battles/wars: World War I World War II
- Awards: Iron Cross, 1st and 2nd class Clasp to the Iron Cross, 2nd class War Merit Cross, 1st and 2nd class with Swords; Wound Badge, in silver

Ludwig Clemens August Grauert (9 January 1891 – 4 June 1964) was a German lawyer and business executive who served as a police official and as the state secretary in the Prussian and Reich Ministry of the Interior in Nazi Germany. He played a key role in purging the police of Nazi opponents, and in drafting the Reichstag Fire Decree. He resigned under pressure in 1936 and returned to executive positions in the private sector. Grauert also was an SS-Brigadeführer. As an Oberst in the Luftwaffe during the Second World War, he was the commander of an anti-aircraft regiment.

== Early life ==
Grauert was born in Münster, attended Volksschule and the Realgymnasium there and attained his Abitur. He next studied law at the University of Münster and the Ludwig-Maximilians-Universität München. He passed his Referendar examination in October 1913, and began employment as a law clerk at the Hamm Higher Regional Court. On the outbreak of the First World War, he entered the Imperial German Army in August 1914 and served on the front lines until March 1918, first with the 4th (Westphalian) Cuirassiers "von Driesen" and then, from August 1916, as a Leutnant with a machine gun company in the 15th Reserve Infantry Regiment. From March 1918 until the end of the war in November, he trained as a pilot. Wounded four times, he received the Iron Cross 1st and 2nd class and the Wound Badge in silver. Returning to civilian life after the war, he passed his Assessor exam in January 1921 and became a court assessor at the public prosecutor's offices in Münster and Bochum until 1923.

Between 1923 and 1928, Grauert worked as the head of the property protection department of the Employers' Association of the lower Ruhr smelting works in Duisburg. In the years from 1928 to 1933, he was an executive board member and business manager of the Employers' Association of the northwestern group of German iron and steel industrialists in Düsseldorf. He unsuccessfully stood for election to the Reichstag for the Conservative People's Party in the 1930 German federal election. Grauert was one of the approximately two-dozen industrialists who attended the Secret Meeting of 20 February 1933 with Adolf Hitler that raised over 2,000,000 Reichsmarks for the Nazi's upcoming Reichstag election campaign.

== Nazi Party career ==
On 7 February 1933, Hermann Göring, then the Prussian Reichskommissar for Interior, appointed Grauert as head of the Prussian police department in the Prussian Ministry of the Interior as the successor to Erich Klausener. In this capacity, Grauert played a key role in purging the police of opponents of the Nazis in the months that followed and, on 22 February, he was promoted to ministerial director.

On the night of the Reichstag fire of 27–28 February 1933, the Prussian police began rounding up dozens of Communist opponents of the regime. The next morning, at a meeting at the Prussian Interior Ministry, Grauert proposed the passing of an emergency decree against arson and acts of terrorism to provide legal cover for the mass arrests and to deal with further acts of violence. This proposal was expanded by Reich Interior Minister Wilhelm Frick to apply to all of Germany by giving the Reich government the right to intervene in any German state that did not maintain order. Thus, Grauert's draft formed the basis for the Reichstag Fire Decree, which suspended many of the fundamental rights of the Weimar Republic, thereby eliminating the rule of law and establishing the basis of the Nazi dictatorship.

On 11 April 1933, Göring became the Prussian minister president and promoted Grauert to state secretary in the Prussian Interior Ministry, while the office of ministerial director passed to Kurt Daluege. On 1 May 1933, Grauert joined the Nazi Party (membership number 3,262,849) and he joined the Schutzstaffel (SS) on 2 June 1933 (SS number 118,475) with the rank of SS-Oberführer. On 22 June 1933, as state secretary, Grauert issued the orders for the establishment of the Börgermoor concentration camp where hundreds of the regime's opponents were incarcerated. On 11 July 1933, Göring appointed Grauert to the recently reconstituted Prussian State Council. On 2 October 1933, he became a founding member of Hans Frank's Academy for German Law and he was made chairman of its Committee on Police Law. When the Prussian Interior Ministry was merged with the Reich Interior Ministry under Frick on 1 November 1934, Grauert remained a state secretary in the combined ministry. On 20 April 1935, he was promoted to SS-Brigadeführer.

== Removal from office ==
However, on 17 June 1936, authority over all German police passed from the Interior Ministry to the SS under Reichsführer-SS Heinrich Himmler, and Grauert lost his considerable power base. Also, for some time, he had been critical of the Party's attacks on the civil service, advocating for a professional elite corps. Opposition from party leaders led to the Supreme Party Court opening an investigation against him. To forestall a proceeding that could result in a prison term, Grauert resigned from his post as state secretary, effective 30 June 1936. Göring, however, retained his loyal protégé as an appointed member of the Prussian State Council.

== Return to the private sector and Luftwaffe war service ==
After leaving the civil service, Grauert returned to industry in the energy sector, becoming a member of the board of directors of the Deutsche Continental Gasgesellschaft in Dessau. He also became the chairman of the board of trustees for general and internal administration of the Berlin Administrative Academy. Grauert underwent military training in a Luftwaffe flak artillery unit and was the commander of an anti-aircraft regiment deployed in Denmark from November 1942 until August 1944, with the rank of Oberst of reserves.

== Post-war life ==
Grauert appeared as a defense witness for the SS at the Nuremberg trials in 1946, and testified that any criminal actions committed during the early days of the regime were due to the chaotic state of the country at that time. Few details are known of his subsequent life, and he died in Cologne in June 1964.

== Sources ==
- Evans, Richard J. (2005). The Coming of the Third Reich. New York: Penguin Books. ISBN 978-0-143-03469-8.
- Klee, Ernst (2007). Das Personenlexikon zum Dritten Reich. Wer war was vor und nach 1945. Frankfurt-am-Main: Fischer-Taschenbuch-Verlag. ISBN 978-3-596-16048-8.
- Lilla, Joachim (2005). Der Preußische Staatsrat 1921–1933: Ein biographisches Handbuch. Düsseldorf: Droste Verlag. ISBN 978-3-770-05271-4.
- McKale, Donald M. (1974). The Nazi Party Courts: Hitler's Management of Conflict in His Movement, 1921–1945. University Press of Kansas. ISBN 0-7006-0122-8.
- Schiffer Publishing Ltd., ed. (2000). SS Officers List: SS-Standartenführer to SS-Oberstgruppenführer (As of 30 January 1942). Schiffer Military History Publishing. ISBN 0-7643-1061-5.
