= Estel =

Dutch-German steel company

- Industry: Steel
- Predecessor: IJmuiden steelworks, Hoesch Dortmund steelworks
- Founded: 1972
- Defunct: 1982
- Successor: IJmuiden steelworks, Hoesch Dortmund steelworks
- Headquarters: Nijmegen, Netherlands
- Number of locations: IJmuiden, Dortmund
- Products: Iron, Raw steel, finished steel, manufactured steel

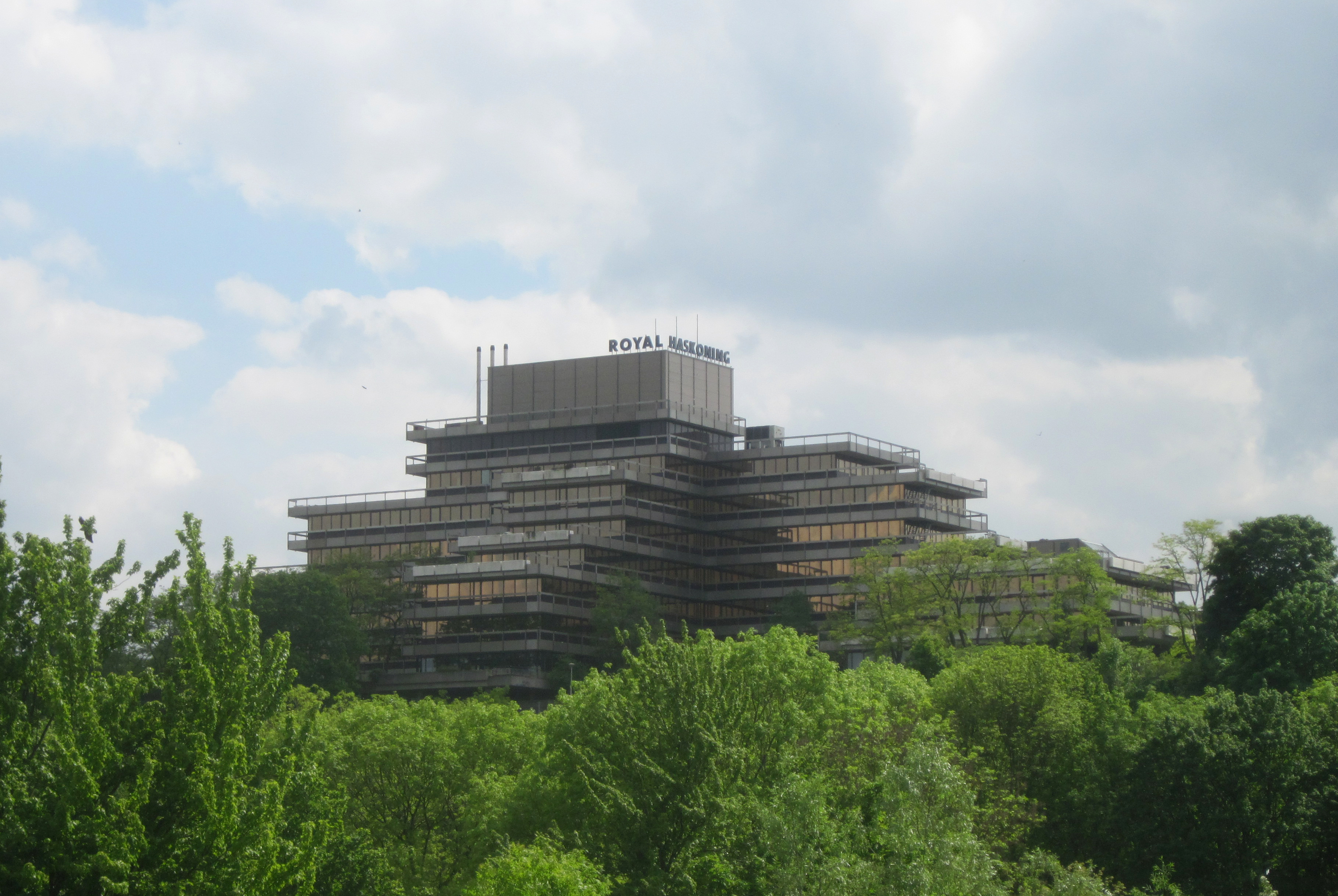
Office building of Royal HaskoningDHV

Estel (also styled as ESTEL) was a steel company formed by the merging of Koninklijke Hoogovens IJmuiden steel plant and Hoesch's main steel plant in Dortmund. The company existed from 1972 to 1982 until de-merged.

== History ==
In 1966 the board of Koninklijke Hoogovens voted in favour of merging their IJmuiden steelworks with the Dortmund plant of German steelmaker Hoesch; Hoesch would benefit from the IJmuiden steelwork's port, and Koninklijke Hoogovens' 43% shareholding in the Dortmund-Hörder Hüttenunion (DHHU) was converted into a 15% shareholding in Hoesch with Hoesch acquiring DHUU. (Note: Koninkijke Hoogoven had a share in Phoenix AG für Bergbau und Hüttenbetrieb of Dortmund which had been merged into Vereinigte Stahlwerke; following the breakup of that concern in 1953 Hoogoven's share was converted into a holding of the Dortmund based Dortmund-Hörder Hüttenunion.) The two firms made agreements on division of work between the plants – IJmuiden was to concentrate on pig iron, crude steel, and semi-manufactured products, whilst Hoesch's Dortmund plant was to produce finished steels and manufactured products. The two entities were merged in 1972, forming Estel NV, headquarter in Nijmegen.

In the mid-1970s the Steel crisis caused overcapacity in steel production throughout Europe; Estel needed to invest to improve production quality and efficiency to compensate for loss of production volume, and to cut production costs; additionally Hoesch's branch of Estel was making losses, and required support; as such it sought investment from both the German and Netherlands government; however the Dutch government was only willing to invest if the German state also supported the venture, whilst the German state wished any restructuring and investment to be done in collaboration with Krupp (also loss making) which was not acceptable to Dutch banks. As a result, in 1982 the 50:50 partnership of Estel was dissolved, with Hoesch taking 61% of its liabilities.
