= Secret Meeting of 20 February 1933 =

Campaign fund raising conference between Hitler and German industrialists

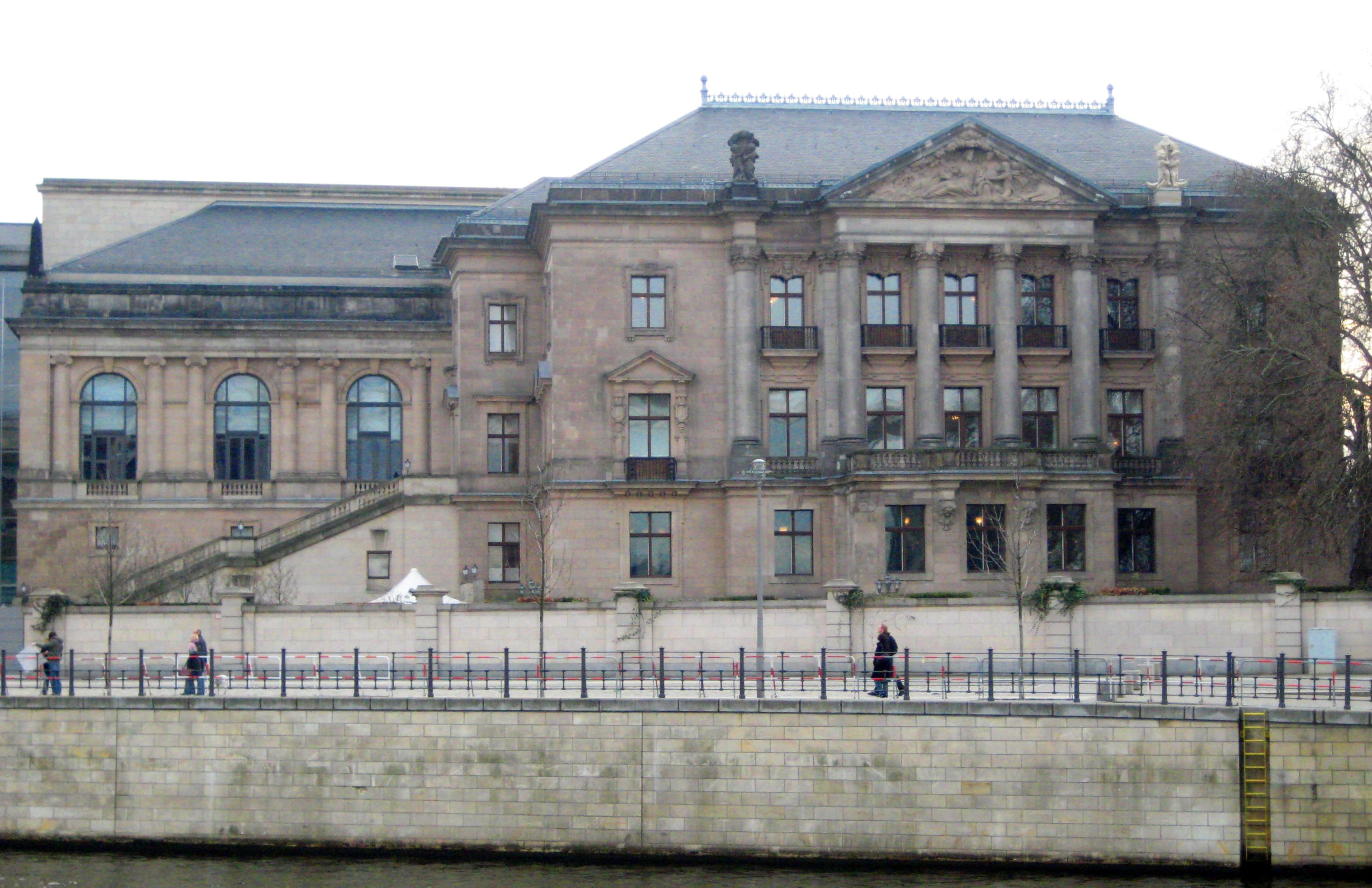
The Reichstagspräsidentenpalais (Reichstag Presidential Palace), the building in which the meeting took place

The Secret Meeting of 20 February 1933 (German: Geheimtreffen vom 20. Februar 1933) was a secret meeting held by Adolf Hitler and 25 industrialists at the official residence of the President of the Reichstag Hermann Göring in Berlin. Its purpose was to raise funds for the election campaign of the Nazi Party.

The German elections were to be held on 5 March 1933. The Nazi Party wanted to achieve two-thirds majority to pass the Enabling Act and desired to raise three million Reichsmark to fund the campaign. According to records, 2,071,000 Reichsmarks (equivalent to €9,600,103 in 2021) were contributed at the meeting, although Goebbels also claimed that a full 3 million were received. Together with the Industrial petition, it is used as evidence to support the idea that big business played a central role in the rise of the Nazi Party.

== Participants ==
The meeting was attended by the following business representatives:

1. Ernst Brandi, chairman of Bergbauverein
2. Karl Büren, director general of Braunkohlen- und Brikettindustrie AG, board member of Deutschen Arbeitgeberverbände
3. August Diehn, board member of Wintershall AG
4. Ludwig Grauert
5. Guenther Heubel, director general of C. TH. Heye Braunkohlenwerke AG, board member of Deutschen Arbeitgeberverbände
6. Gustav Krupp von Bohlen und Halbach
7. Hans Louis Ferdinand von Löwenstein zu Löwenstein, executive member of Bergbauverein
8. Fritz von Opel, board member of Adam Opel AG
9. Günther Quandt, major industrialist, later appointed Leader of the Armament Economy (Wehrwirtschaftsführer)
10. Wolfgang Reuter, director general of Demag, chairman of Vereins Deutscher Maschinenbau-Anstalten, presidential member of Reichsverbands der Deutschen Industrie
11. August Rosterg, director general of Wintershall AG
12. Hjalmar Schacht
13. Georg von Schnitzler, board member of IG Farben
14. Eduard Schulte, director general of Giesches Erben, Zink und Bergbaubetrieb
15. Fritz Springorum, Hoesch AG
16. Hugo Stinnes Jr., board member of Reichsverband der Deutschen Industrie, member of the Supervisory board of Rhenish-Westphalian Coal Syndicate
17. Ernst Tengelmann, CEO of Gelsenkirchener Bergwerks AG
18. Albert Vögler, CEO of Vereinigte Stahlwerke
19. Ludwig von Winterfeld, board member of Siemens & Halske and Siemens-Schuckertwerke
20. Wolf-Dietrich von Witzleben, head of the office of Carl Friedrich von Siemens

According to historian Gerald D. Feldman also present were:

- Kurt Schmitt, board member of Allianz
- August von Finck, served on numerous boards and committees.

Georg von Schnitzler said in his 10 November 1945 statement before the Office of US Chief of Counsel for Prosecution of Axis Criminality that Paul Stein, chairman of Gewerkschaft Auguste Victoria, a mine owned by IG Farben, and member of the German People's Party was also present at the reunion. Also the steel baron Friedrich Flick was definitely there, and the notes that survive of Hitler's speech come from his file and were included in the prosecution against him at the Nuremberg Tribunals

== Sequence of events ==
First Hermann Göring gave a short speech in which he emphasized the importance of the current election campaign. Then Hitler appeared and gave a ninety-minute speech. He praised the concept of private property and argued that the Nazi Party would be the nation's only salvation against the communist threat. The basis of the Nazi Party is the national idea and the concern over the nation's defense capabilities. Life is a continuous struggle and only the fittest could survive. Concurrently, only a militarily fit nation could thrive economically.

In his speech, Hitler declared democracy culpable for the rise of communism. The following are translated excerpts of what remains of his speech:

Private enterprise cannot be maintained in the age of democracy;[…]

We are today facing the following situation. The Weimar Government imposed upon us a certain constitutional order by which they put us on a democratic basis. By that we were, however, not provided with an able governmental authority. On the contrary, for the same reasons for which I criticized democracy before, it was inevitable that communism, in ever greater measure, penetrated the minds of the German people.[…]

Two fronts have thus taken shape which put to us the choice: either Marxism in its purest form, or the other side.

Then Hitler declared that he needed complete control of the state to crush communism:

We must first gain complete power if we want to crush the other side completely.[...] In Prussia, we must still gain another 10 seats, and in the Reich proper, another 33. That is not impossible if we exert all our strength. Then, only, begins the second action against communism.

Hitler concluded by saying that it would be "the last election” and if he did not win, he would stay in power “by other means… with other weapons.” After Hitler's speech, Krupp expressed thanks to the participants and put special emphasis on the commitment to private property and to the nation's defense capabilities. Hitler then left the meeting. Göring gave a short speech in which he pointed out the emptiness of the Nazi Party's campaign war chest and asked the gentlemen present to help remedy this shortage. Göring also pointed out that the next election would "surely be the last one for the next ten years", which should ease the “financial sacrifices” being asked of the industry. Then Göring left and Hjalmar Schacht took the floor. Schacht requested three million Reichsmark. The money was made out to Nationale Treuhand, Dr. Hjalmar Schacht and deposited in the Bank of Delbrück Schickler & Co. A statement from the IG Farben Trial indicated a total of 2,071,000 Reichsmark had been paid. The money then went to Rudolf Hess who transferred it to Franz Eher Nachfolger.

== Subsequent events ==
Joseph Goebbels who had written the previous day of the meeting in his diary, describing the depressed mood at his Berlin headquarters because of the lack of funds, wrote the next the day of the meeting:

Göring brings the joyful news that three million is available for the election. Great thing! I immediately alert the whole propaganda department. And one hour later, the machines rattle. Now we will turn on an election campaign . . . Today the work is fun. The money is there.

Subsequent circumstances were favorable for the NSDAP, so that they were able to make significant gains in the Reichstag elections on March 5, 1933. However surprising to many observers they failed to achieve an absolute majority. The actual conclusion of this development, which was centrally supported by the meeting and the resulting payments, was when Chancellor Hitler seized power with the Enabling Act of March 23, 1933, which authorized his government to enact laws without the approval of the Reichstag. In a letter from Krupp to Hitler dated March 24, 1933, the Reich Association of German Industry welcomed the election result with the words:

The elections have laid the basis for a stable foundation of government, removing the disruptions resulting from the constant political vacillations of the past, which have severely crippled economic initiative.

and explained:

The Reich Association of German Industry - as the economic and political representative - will do everything to help the Reich government in its difficult work.

== Contributions ==
The total contributions made to the Nazi Party totalled 2,071,000 Reichsmark. Below the sum is broken down by transaction.

Transactions involving the account of Nationale Treuhand, Dr. Hjalmar Schacht at the Bank of Delbrück Schickler & Co.
Date	Depositor	Sum
23 February	Bergbauverein	200,000 Reichsmark
24 February	Karl Hermann	150,000 Reichsmark
24 February	Automobil-Ausstellung, Berlin	100,000 Reichsmark
25 February	Dir. A. Steinke	200,000 Reichsmark
25 February	Demag	50,000 Reichsmark
27 February	Telefunken	35,000 Reichsmark
27 February	Osram	40,000 Reichsmark
28 February	IG Farben	400,000 Reichsmark
1 March	Hjalmar Schacht	125,000 Reichsmark
3 March	Dir. Karl Lange, Engineering industry	50,000 Reichsmark
3 March	Bergbauverein	100,000 Reichsmark
3 March	Karl Hermann, Berlin Dessauer Str.	150,000 Reichsmark
3 March	AEG	60,000 Reichsmark
March 7	Fritz Springorum	36,000 Reichsmark
March 7	Accumulatorenfabrik AG, Berlin (Owner: Günther Quandt)	25,000 Reichsmark
13 March	Bergbauverein	300,000 Reichsmark
Final Balance		2,071,000 Reichsmark

According to researchers, including Kurt Pätzold, this meeting provides further evidence of the financing of the Nazi Party by big business. On the other hand, Historian Henry Ashby Turner pointed out that the contributions were not entirely voluntary, designating that meeting as a "milestone: the first important material contribution of organizations of the big business to the Nazistic cause".

British historian Adam Tooze writes, however:

The meeting of 20 February and its aftermath are the most notorious instances of the willingness of German big business to assist Hitler in establishing his dictatorial regime. The evidence cannot be dodged.

== In fiction ==
The Order of the Day is a novel by the French writer Éric Vuillard dealing with this event.

== See also ==
- The Industrial petition
- Circle of Friends of the Economy
- List of companies involved in the Holocaust
