= Mekog =

Fertiliser factory in Netherlands

Coordinates: 52.475809°N 4.614658°E

Maatschappij tot Exploitatie van Kooksovengas (Mekog)
- Industry: Chemical
- Founded: 1928
- Defunct: 2010
- Fate: closed, part of plant shipped to Pernis
- Headquarters: nr. IJmuiden, Netherlands
- Products: Ammonia, Nitrogen fertilizers

Mekog (Maatschappij tot Exploitatie van Kooksovengas, English coke oven gas exploitation company) was a chemical company founded 1928, that manufactured fertilizer using hydrogen from coke oven gas as a feedstock. The company's facilities were located on the site of the Koninklijke Nederlandsche Hoogovens en Staalfabrieken steelworks near IJmuiden in the Netherlands.

== History ==
During the 1920s, the company Koninklijke Nederlandsche Hoogovens en Staalfabrieken (KNHS) constructed a steelworks on the north bank of North Sea Canal near IJmuiden; the steel production process produced a number of auxiliary by-products including a variety of carbon and hydrogen based compounds from the production of coke from coal. Mekog was established in 1928 as a joint venture between KNHS and Bataafse Petroleum Maatschappij to use the hydrogen content of the coke oven gas to manufacture ammonia to make nitrogen based fertilizers. Production began in September 1929. The plant was located in the southeast corner of the IJmuiden site.

As initially built the process involved firstly washing the coke oven gas (~50% hydrogen, 25% methane, 15% nitrogen, 6% Carbon monoxide, 2% Carbon dioxide as main components) to remove benzene, tar and related compounds. The gas was then compressed (15atm) and washed again to remove CO_{2}, followed by refrigeration to -200 °C which liquified the gas mixture with the exception of the hydrogen, which could then be separated and purified for the ammonia process. Syntheses of ammonia was carried out at 450 °C at 80 atm using an iron cyanide catalyst (the Mont Cenis Process) – the ammonia was washed out and the unreacted recirculated into the reaction. The ammonia produced was reacted with dilute sulphuric acid to return Ammonium sulphate as the product; initially 200 ton per day was produced. At nitric acid plant opened in 1930, and a phosphoric acid plant briefly operated in the 1930s, but was uneconomic. In 1939, calcium ammonium nitrate production was started.

In 1949/50, and in 1955, the plant's capacity was expanded resulting in a primary ammonia capacity of over 93000 tons by 1955; the 1955 development introduced the use of petroleum as a

In 1961, the company merged with Albatros Superfosfaatfabrieken to create Verenigde Kunstmestfabrieken Mekog-Albatros (VKF); this firm created a joint venture with BASF: Ammoniak Unie, which established an ammonia plant in Pernis, Netherlands. VKF merged with the fertilizer division of DSM in 1972, creating Unie van Kunstmest Fabrieken (UKF) which was part owned by KNHS, Koninklijke Nederlandse Zoutindustrie (KNZ), Shell and DSM, KHNS and KNZ left the venture in 1973 leaving the company three quarters owned by DSM. UKF became a full DSM subsidiary in 1979, including Mekog under the group 'DSM Agro BV'.

By 1967, the plant was producing 564000 tonnes of fertilizer (ammonia content 145000 tonnes) and employed a peak of 1160 people; discovery of a large gas resources at Groningen, the Netherlands (Groningen gas field)) altered the 'energy balance' in the Netherlands – and production was done using natural gas instead of coke oven gas.

In 2008, DSM Agro and the Dutch government reached an agreement to end potentially dangerous rail transportation of Ammonia between IJmuiden and Geleen; as a result the former 'Mekog' plant was no longer viable. DSM was to closed its IJmuiden plant on 1 January 2010, and would receive compensation (approximately €48 million) from the Dutch government; a nitric acid plant at IJmuiden was to be relocated to Geleen. Approximately 120 people were made redundant as a direct result of the closure.

The nitric acid plant was moved to Geleen during the first half of 2010, to be operated by the agrochemicals division of Orascom Construction Industries, which had acquired DSM agro in June 2010. The relocated plant is part of the OCI Agro unit of the Nitrogen division of OCI.
