= Indra Gunawan =

Indra Gunawan may refer to:

- Indra Gunawan (footballer), Indonesian footballer
- Indra Gunawan (swimmer), Indonesian swimmer
- Indra Gunawan (badminton), Indonesian badminton player and coach
