= Gunawan Steel Group =

Indonesian steel company

Gunawan Group
- Type: Private
- Industry: Steel
- Founded: 1989
- Defunct: 1998
- Number of locations: Indonesia, Malaysia
- Subsidiaries: Gunawan Dian Steel Pipe (GDSP); Gunawan Iron Steel (GIS); Gunawan Dianjaya Steel (GDS)
- Website: www.gunawansteel.com

The Gunawan Steel Group was an Indonesian steel group founded 1989, which owned several Steel works in Southeast Asia. The group's companies were taken over by the Indonesian Bank Restructuring Agency (Badan Penyehatan perbankan Nasional, BPPN) in 1998 following financial problems as a result of the 1997 Asian financial crisis.

As of 2012 the subsidiary Gunawan Dianjaya Steel remains in business, the plate mill of Gunawan Iron and Steel was acquired by Lion Group and operates as Lion Plant Mill Sdn Bhd,

== History and description ==
The group consisted of three steel industry companies; Gunawan Dian Steel Pipe (GDSP) based in Surabaya, Indonesia; Gunawan Iron and Steel (GIS) based in Kuala Terengganu, Malaysia and Gunawan Dianjaya Steel (GDS) (Surabaya, Indonesia).

GDSP produced electric resistance welded steel pipe and had a capacity of 300,000 tonnes per year (2008 figure). GDS had a production capacity of 400,000 tonnes of plate per year.

GIS's steel plant was created in the late 1990s through the re-assembly of equipment acquired from steel works in Europe; a $760 million development plan included equipment acquired from the closed Ravenscraig steelworks in Scotland, Blast furnace capacity was acquired from Koninklijke Hoogovens by dismantling and shipping a disused blast furnace, a LD-converter was acquired from Voest Alpine. The company had a capacity of 250,000 tonnes of plate per year; the Terengganu state had a 30% stake in the company.

After the 1997 Asian financial crisis the groups companies had debts of 1.45 trillion Indonesian rupiah and were taken over by the Indonesian Bank Restructuring Agency (Badan Penyehatan perbankan Nasional, BPPN). The assets of GIS and GDSP were later acquired by Bina Kreasi Primaniagatama at a much lower value than their capital worth. In 2004 it was alleged that the sale of the groups steel companies was corrupt and had cost the (Indonesian) state 1.2 Trillion - it was claimed that the companies that reacquired the assets were part of the Gunawan group - a transaction that violated governmental asset sale regulations.

The GIS plate mill became part of the Lion Group and production was restarted in 2003.

Gunawan Dianjaya Steel (GDS) was owned by the Gunawan family in 2008, and launched an IPO in 2009, raising $16.8million for 12.2% of the company.
