= Ernst Tengelmann =

German entrepreneur

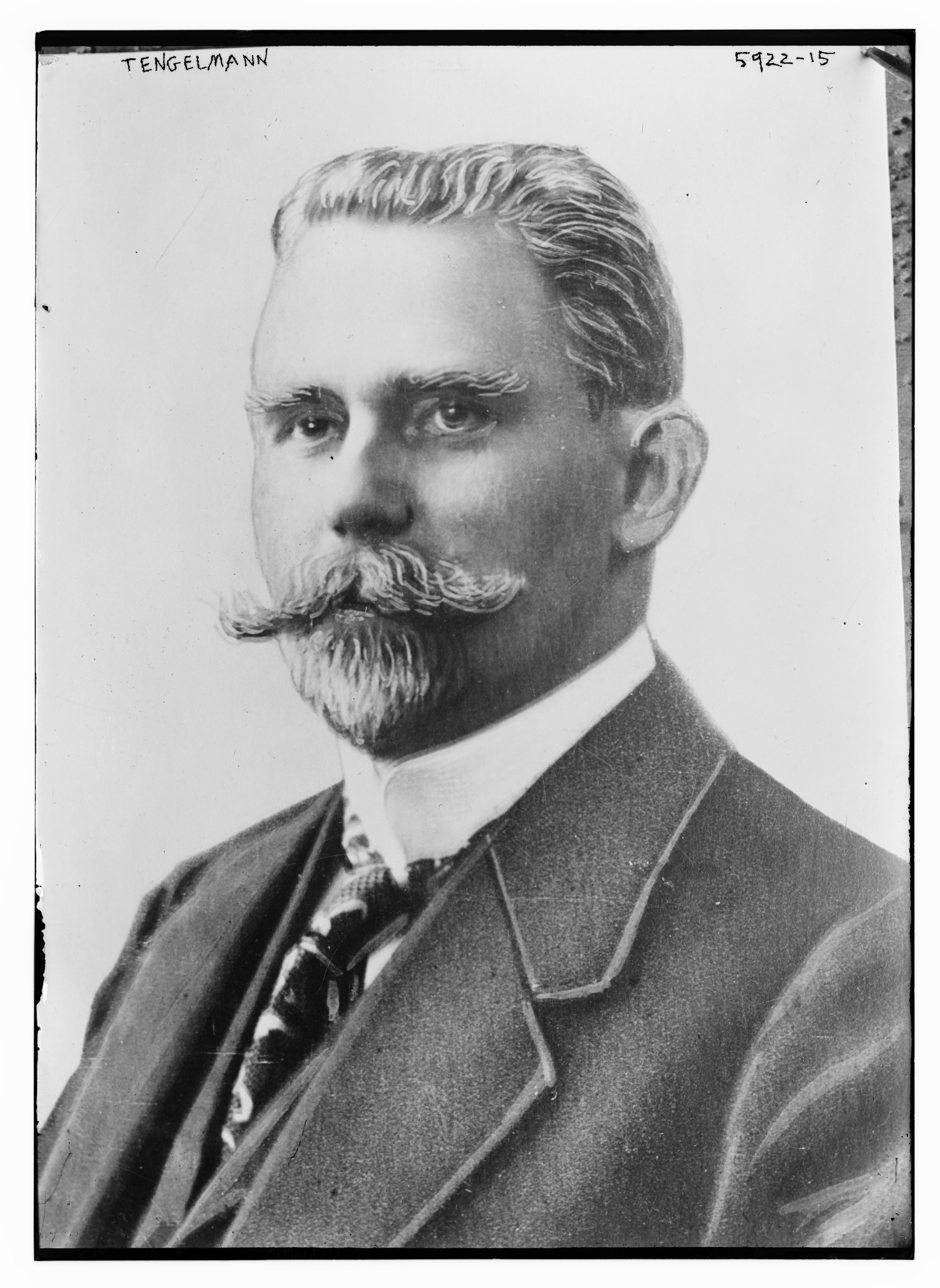
Ernst Tengelmann photo

Ernst Tengelmann (14 January 1870 – 30 March 1954) was a German entrepreneur. From 1912 he was Director-General of the Essener Steinkohlenbergwerke AG and CEO of Gelsenkirchener Bergwerks-AG. In addition to Carl Hold and Gustav Knepper he was one of the most influential mining figures in 1930s Ruhr Valley.

In the 1920s Tengelmann was an active member of the German People's Party, but in 1930 he joined the Nazi party and participated in the Secret Meeting of 20 February 1933 where he gave the party considerable financial support. His sons, Walter and Wilhelm also worked actively for the Nazi party.
