= Iron cyanide =

Iron cyanide may refer to:

- Iron(I) cyanide, FeCN
- Iron(II) cyanide, Fe(CN)_{2}
- Ferrocyanide, [Fe(CN)_{6}]^{4−}
- Ferricyanide, [Fe(CN)_{6}]^{3−}
