= Leopold Hoesch (entrepreneur) =

German entrepreneur

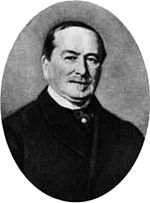
Leopold Hoesch

Leopold Hoesch (born 13 January 1820 in Düren, died 21 April 1899 in Düren) was a German entrepreneur. In 1871 he founded the Eisen-und Stahlwerk Hoesch AG, later the Westfalenhütte in Dortmund, Westphalia.

== Biography ==
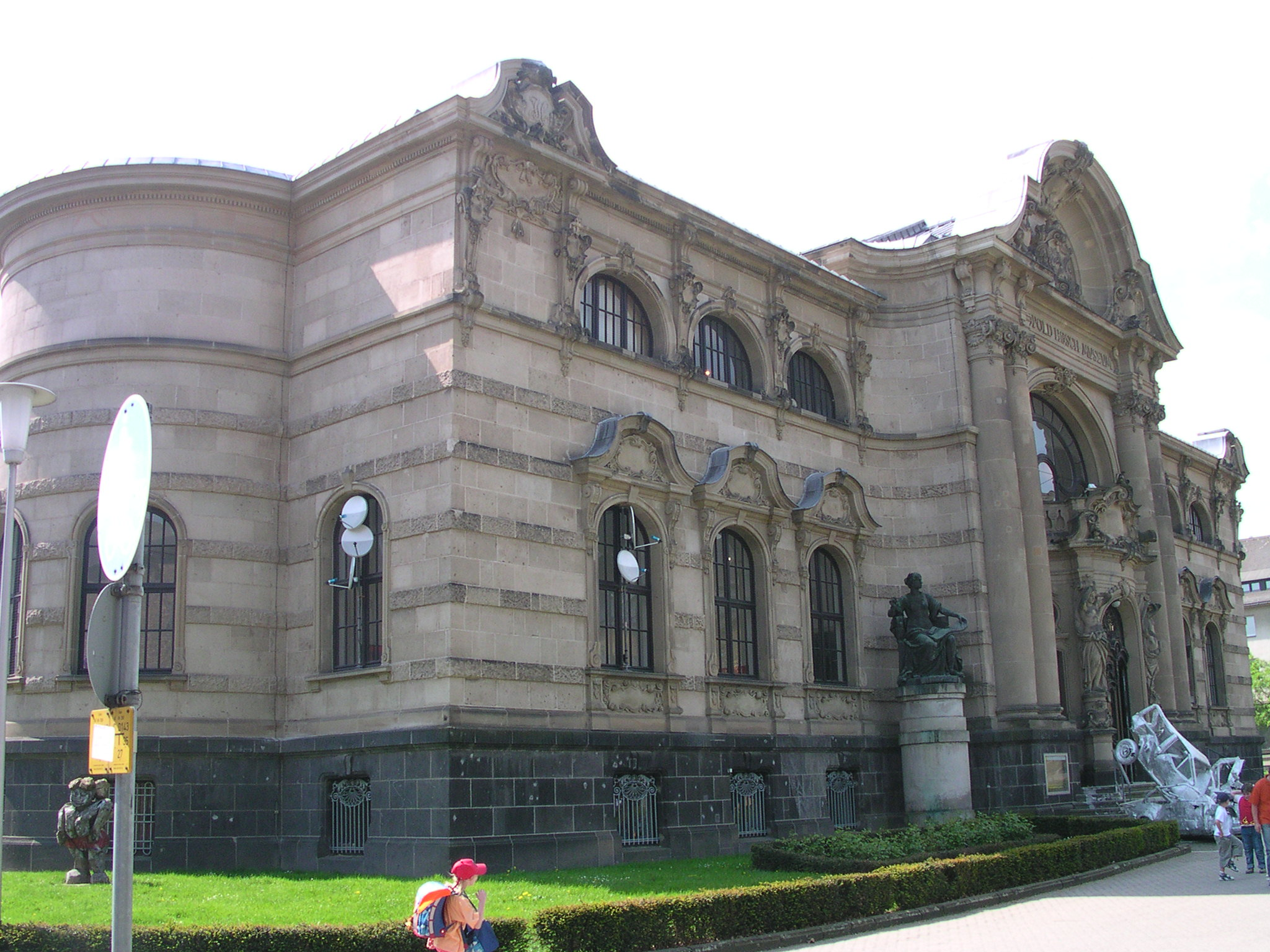
Leopold Hoesch Museum in Düren

In 1846, Hoesch's father expanded the family business, founding a rolling mill in Eschweiler and acquiring ten additional mine fields. On October 1, 1846, the company "Gebrüder Eberhard and Wilhelm Hoesch" (named after Leopold's father and uncle) went on to operate under the name "Eberhard Hoesch & Söhne."

After the death of his uncle Eberhard on 21 April 1852, Leopold became the new head of the company.

During the 1860s, Hoesch moved the company's headquarters to the Ruhr area in order to benefit from low freight costs and the proximity to the coal mines.

Together with his sons Wilhelm (1845-1923) and Albert (1847-1898), as well as with the sons of his uncle Eberhard, Viktor and Eberhard Hoesch, on 1 September 1871 he founded the "Eisen- und Stahlwerk Hoesch" in Dortmund. The company was initially an OHG and was transformed into a public limited company two years later, the shares of which remained family-owned and which has since been operating under the name "Hoesch AG". The new company set up its own company health insurance fund, and later a death benefit fund.
