= Hoesch AG =

German steel and mining company

Hoesch

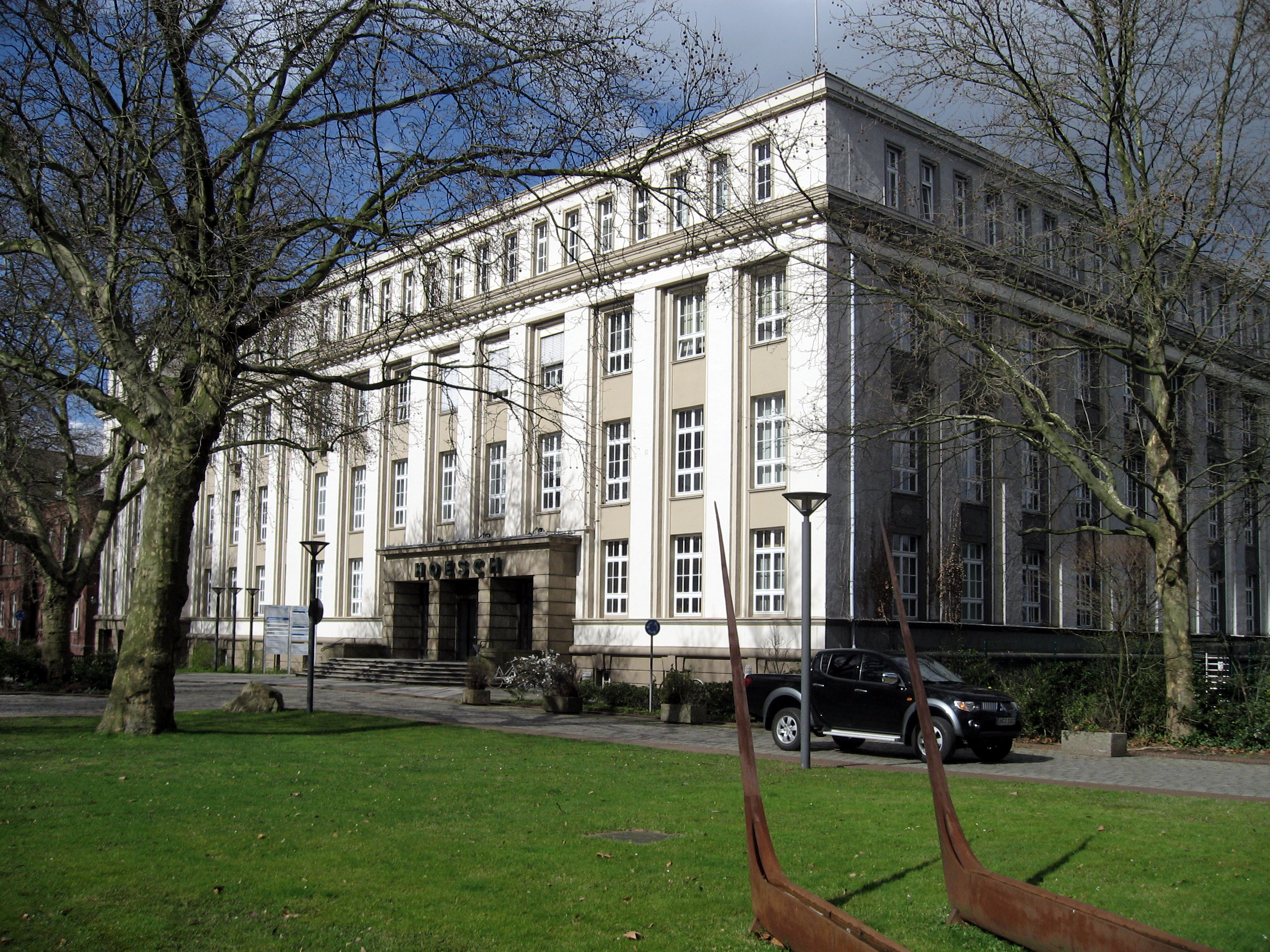
- Hoesch's headquarters in Dortmund, Germany
- Native name: Hoesch AG
- Type: Private
- Industry: Conglomerate, steel manufacturing, Mining
- Predecessor: Baroper Walzwerk; Dortmund-Hörder Hüttenverein; Friedrichshütte; Köln-Neuessener Bergwerksverein
- Founded: 1871; 155 years ago in Dortmund, German Empire
- Founder: Leopold Hoesch
- Defunct: 1992
- Successor: ThyssenKrupp
- Revenue: DM 2,358 billion
- Owner: Hoesch family
- Number of employees: 48,600+ (1965)

Hoesch (/hɜːrʃ/; German: Hoesch AG; formerly also Eberhard Hoesch & Sons and Hoesch-Werke) was a German steel and mining conglomerate headquartered in Dortmund and several subsidiaries across the Ruhr region and Siegen. Founded in 1871, by Leopold Hoesch, it employed over 30,000 people by 1938 and was among the largest companies in Nazi Germany.

In 1972, the prominent steel producer merged with the Dutch Hoogovens steel company to form Estel. Hoesch was formerly the largest employer in Dortmund. In 1982, the merger with Dutch company Estel was stopped by Detlev Karsten Rohwedder, and Hoesch became again an independent company. In 1991, German competitor Krupp (presently ThyssenKrupp) bought Hoesch and the merger was completed by 1992.

== History ==
The Hoesch family had long been established in the Eifel region with various metalworking companies prior to the founding of the Dortmund company, operating factories in Monschau, Lendersdorf near Düren (since 1819), and Eschweiler (since 1847).

In 1871, Leopold Hoesch, along with his sons Wilhelm (1845–1923) and Albert Hoesch (1847–1898), as well as his cousins Viktor (1824–1888) and Eberhard Hoesch (1827–1907), founded a new iron and steelworks in Dortmund, in the then-province of Westphalia, to capitalize on the location advantages of the emerging Ruhr region (rich coal deposits, railway for ore transportation).

During the 1890s, Hoesch also took-over parts of the manufacturing of the former Hüsing & Co in Warstein, the foundry part was merged with Siepmann. The new company survived the founder's crisis and in 1899 acquired the Westfalia coal mine with its associated Kaiserstuhl coke plant. During the Weimar Republic, Hoesch was one of the few heavy industry companies not integrated into the United Steel Works. In 1930, Hoesch merged with the Cologne-New-Essen Mining Association and in 1966 acquired the Dortmund-Hörder Hüttenunion.

Following the National Socialist takeover in 1933, Hoesch served as an armaments conglomerate, producing tank hulls for Panther and Tiger II types, tank ammunition, gun barrels, and armor plates. During World War II, the company extensively utilized forced labor, with over a third of the workers at the Hoesch steelworks being forced laborers by December 1944.

As a subsidiary, the Hoesch-Benzin GmbH was established in 1936 for the production of synthetic fuels using the Fischer-Tropsch process. The gasoline plant commenced operation in 1939. During the air raids on the Ruhr region, the facilities were nearly completely destroyed — the remaining portion was intended to continue production after World War II under the name Dortmunder Paraffinwerke GmbH but fell victim to the demilitarization orders of the Western Allies.

In 1965, the Hoesch Group generated a revenue of 2.358 billion Deutsche Marks and employed 48,600 workers. At that time, one-fifth of the gainfully employed population in Dortmund worked for "Karl Hoesch." This term was a fondly meant token of respect among Hoesch employees and serves as a pars pro toto, particularly for anything related to the Hoesch company. That time the company was very profitably run by board members Willy Ochel and Gerhard Elkmann who established a successful sales organization.

The September Strike, a successful wildcat strike, began on 2 September 1969.

Amidst the peak of the steel crisis, Hoesch merged in 1972, on the initiative of Fritz Harders, with the Dutch Koninklijke Hoogovens to form the Estel Group. However, the collaboration was terminated in 1982 at the behest of then Hoesch CEO Detlev Rohwedder, who was convinced that the corporate cultures were incompatible and that the Dutch steel managers were disadvantaging the interests of the Dortmund business units. Rohwedder was awarded "Manager of the Year" in 1983 for the successful restructuring of the Hoesch Group.

In 1991, as part of a hostile takeover, the Hoesch AG was acquired by the then Krupp Group. The economically profitable Hoesch AG was bought through a so-called leveraged buyout by the heavily indebted Krupp AG at the time. This hostile takeover thus became the first leveraged buyout of a German stock corporation in the history of the Federal Republic of Germany.

== Nazi involvement ==
Fritz Springorum represented Hoesch AG at the Secret Meeting of 20 February 1933, at which prominent industrialists met with Adolf Hitler to finance the Nazi Party. After the Nazis came to power in 1933, Hoesch served as an armaments company producing Panther and Tiger II tank casings, tank ammunition, gun barrels and armor plate. During World War II, the company made extensive use of forced laborers. In December 1944, over one-third of the workers at Hüttenwerk Hoesch were forced laborers.

The steelworks were targeted by the RAF on 23 May 1943. Bomber command launched a major attack on the industrial complex as part of the Battle of the Ruhr. Of the 826 aircraft which left England 38 aircraft were lost but the pathfinders marked their targets well resulting in a successful strike.
