= Tata Steel Netherlands =

Former Dutch steel company

Coordinates: 52.47839°N 4.59212°E

1918–1996 Koninklijke Nederlandse Hoogovens en Staalfabrieken 1996–1999 Koninklijke Hoogovens
- Type: Naamloze vennootschap
- Founded: 1918; 108 years ago
- Defunct: 1999
- Successor: Corus IJmuiden (1999–2007); Tata Steel Europe IJmuiden (2007-2021); Tata Steel Netherlands IJmuiden (2021–)
- Headquarters: IJmuiden, Netherlands
- Website: https://www.tatasteelnederland.com/

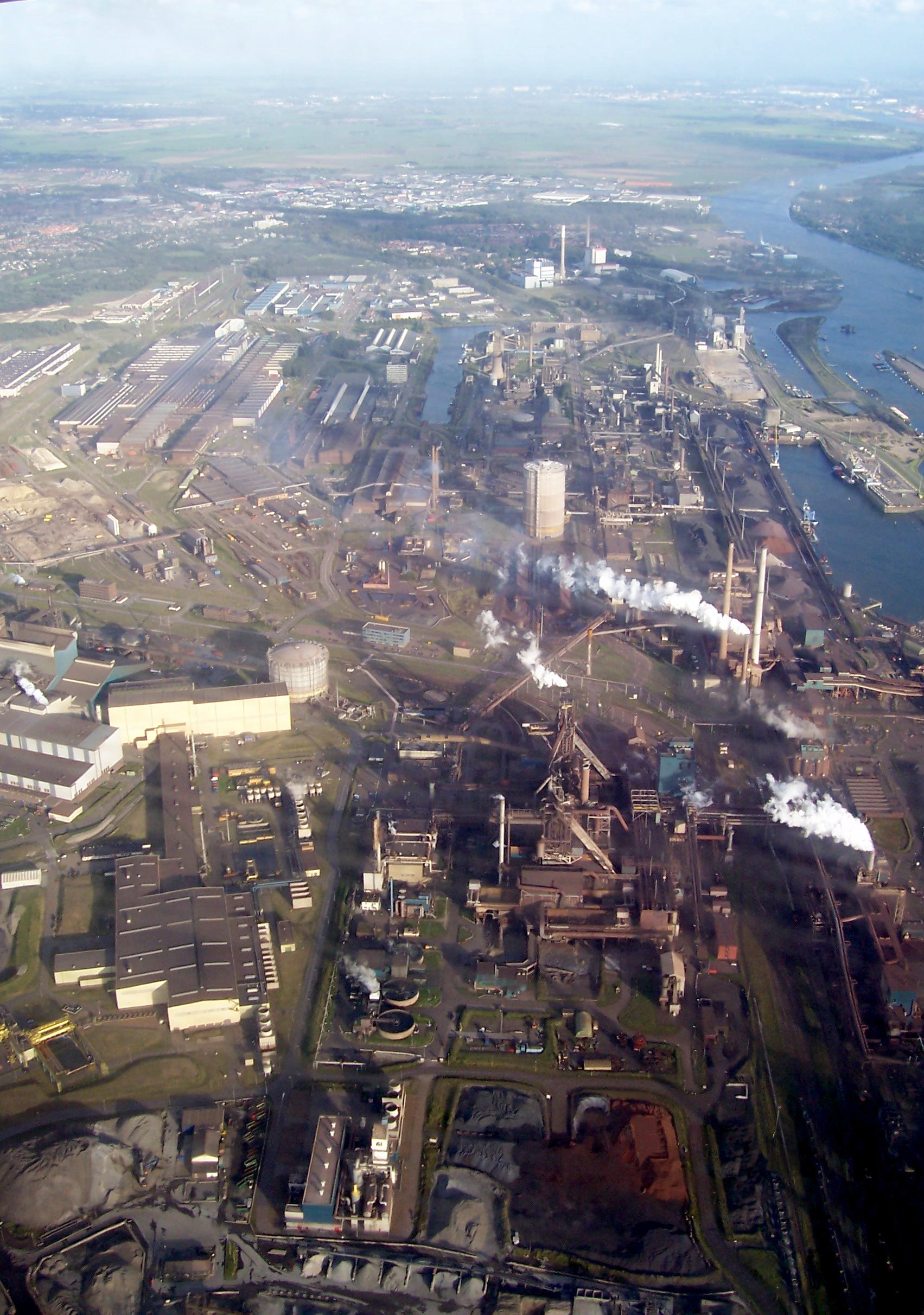
IJmuiden blast furnaces

Koninklijke Hoogovens, known as Koninklijke Nederlandse Hoogovens en Staalfabrieken (KNHS) until 1996, or informally Hoogovens, (Note: Koninklijke Nederlandsche Hoogovens en Staalfabrieken N.V. : English Royal Dutch Blast Furnaces and Steelworks Public Limited; Koninklijke Hoogovens : English: Royal Blast Furnaces; "Hoogoven" (plural "hoogovens") is Dutch for blast furnace) is a Dutch steel producer founded in 1918. Since 2010, the plant has been known as Tata Steel IJmuiden.

The steelworks is based in IJmuiden, the Netherlands. It was built between 1920 and 1940, first producing iron, later steel, with hot and cold rolling producing flat products. In the 1960s the company diversified into aluminium production.

The company merged its IJmuiden steel plant with German steel company Hoesch from 1972 forming the joint venture Estel and separated in 1982. In 1999, the company merged with the larger British Steel plc to create the Corus Group steel company. The aluminium production assets were sold off during the Corus period. In 2007, Corus Group was purchased by India-based Tata Steel and was renamed Tata Steel Europe in 2010.

In 2021, the company was split into a British (Tata Steel UK) and a Dutch (Tata Steel Netherlands) branch: these fall directly under the Indian parent company Tata Steel and Tata Steel Europe ceased to exist.

== History ==
=== IJmuiden steelworks ===
==== 1914–1945 ====
In 1914 H.J.E. Wenckebach and J.C Ankersmit began planning the construction of a steelworks in the Netherlands. In 1916 Ankersmit departed for the United States leaving Wenckebach to continue the work. On 19 April 1917 Wenckebach presented his plans which included the establishment of three blast furnaces, a coking plant, and plants for using the by-products of the process (coking gas and slag). In May 1917 a Comité voor oprichting van een hoogovenstaal- en walswerk in Nederland (Committee for establishing blast furnaces and steel rolling mill in the Netherlands) was set up, with the aim of creating steel works and rolling mills. The plan received support from the large industrial concerns and capitalists of the Netherlands, including Stork, Shell, Steenkolen Handels-Vereeniging (SHV), Philips; Hendrikus Colijn, Frits Fentener van Vlissingen, and J. Muysken. Additionally, the Dutch state and the city of Amsterdam contributed 7.5 million and 5 million of the 30 million Dutch guilders required to fund the project.

On 20 September 1918 the company Koninklijke Nederlandsche Hoogovens en Staalfabrieken N.V. (KNHS) was created in The Hague. Wenckenbach was the Director, Geldolph Adriaan Kessler the secretary, and A.H. Ingen Housz the company's assignee.

One of the motivations for the creation of a steelworks was to end the country's reliance on imported steel. Since the country's resources of coal and iron ore were limited, a site suitable for import and export by sea was chosen, and IJmuiden was chosen over sites at Rotterdam and Moerdijk due to better ground conditions. The site was on the north bank of the North Sea Canal, outside its sea locks, and two harbours were built - the inner harbour opened in 1920, and the outer harbour in 1923.

By 1924 the first blast furnace, casting hall, coke plant, and an electricity generating plant powered by waste gases from the coke ovens and blast furnaces were ready, and the second of two blast furnaces, begun in 1919, became operational in 1926. Both blast furnaces were constructed to a design by American company Freyn, Brassert & Co. The coking plant continued to be expanded throughout the 1920s and 30s, and after World War II. Coal tar, a by-product from coking, was used by the chemical works Cindu (Chemische Industrie Uithoorn), and cleaned coke oven gas was used in the site's power plant and in nearby municipalities. (Note: In 2010 Cindu Chemicals BV was sold to Koppers Holding Inc. (Koppers).) A brickworks (NV Phoenix Maatschappij voor Vervaardiging van Hoogovensteen), was built to use slag from the blast furnace to make building products, but the enterprise ceased in 1927. A third blast furnace started operation in 1930.

In 1928 the KNHS and Royal Dutch Shell set up a joint venture Mekog which was to manufacturer fertiliser using chemicals derived from coke oven gas. A second subsidiary was founded in 1930, an on-site cement factory established as a joint venture between KNHS and the Dutch concrete company Eerste Nederlandse Cement Industrie (ENCI): it was named Cementfabriek IJmuiden (CEMIJ) and manufactured cement using granulated furnace slag as an additive.

During the 1930s the plant was further developed, turning from raw iron production to steel production using open hearth furnaces; again Freyr, Brassert & Co. was chosen to supply the plant's design. A pipe foundry was opened in 1936, and in 1938 construction of a steel conversion plant using the Siemens-Martin (open hearth) process was begun. The first 60-ton capacity open hearth furnace opened 19 March 1939, additional furnaces were added during the 1940s and early 1950s, and the capacity of the furnaces increased - by 1956 the plant had six furnaces, each of 190-ton capacity. Construction of the plant's first rolling mill (Walserij West) began in the late 1930s. During the World War II occupation the mill was confiscated and shipped to Watenstedt (Salzgitter), Germany where it was installed in the Reichswerke Hermann Göring steel plant. After the war, the mill was returned to the Netherlands and remained in operation until decommissioned in 1992.

The Van Leer company established a steel rolling mill (Walsbedrijven NV) at the IJmuiden site in the late 1930s; a plate mill began production in 1938, followed by a strip and profile mill in 1939. As built it was outdated, using second-hand equipment. The mill was built to supply the Van Leer company's own steel needs and not as an independent commercial concern. In 1941, under the Nazi occupation during World War II, Van Leer's Jewish owner Bernard van Leer was forced to flee the country, and the mill was acquired by KNHS and integrated into the rest of the IJmuiden site: it became known as Walserij Oost, remaining in use until 1953, and being replaced by the mills of Breedband NV.

During World War II the company was affected by the German occupation: in 1941 Vereinigte Stahlwerke had acquired 40% of the company from the shareholdings of the state and city of Amsterdam. The directors of the company Housz and Holtrop went into hiding in 1943. The mouth of the North Sea canal at IJmuiden was used as a base for the Kriegsmarine, and the steelworks itself was a strategic target for attack, and bombings and lack of raw materials brought production to a halt.

==== 1945–1999 ====
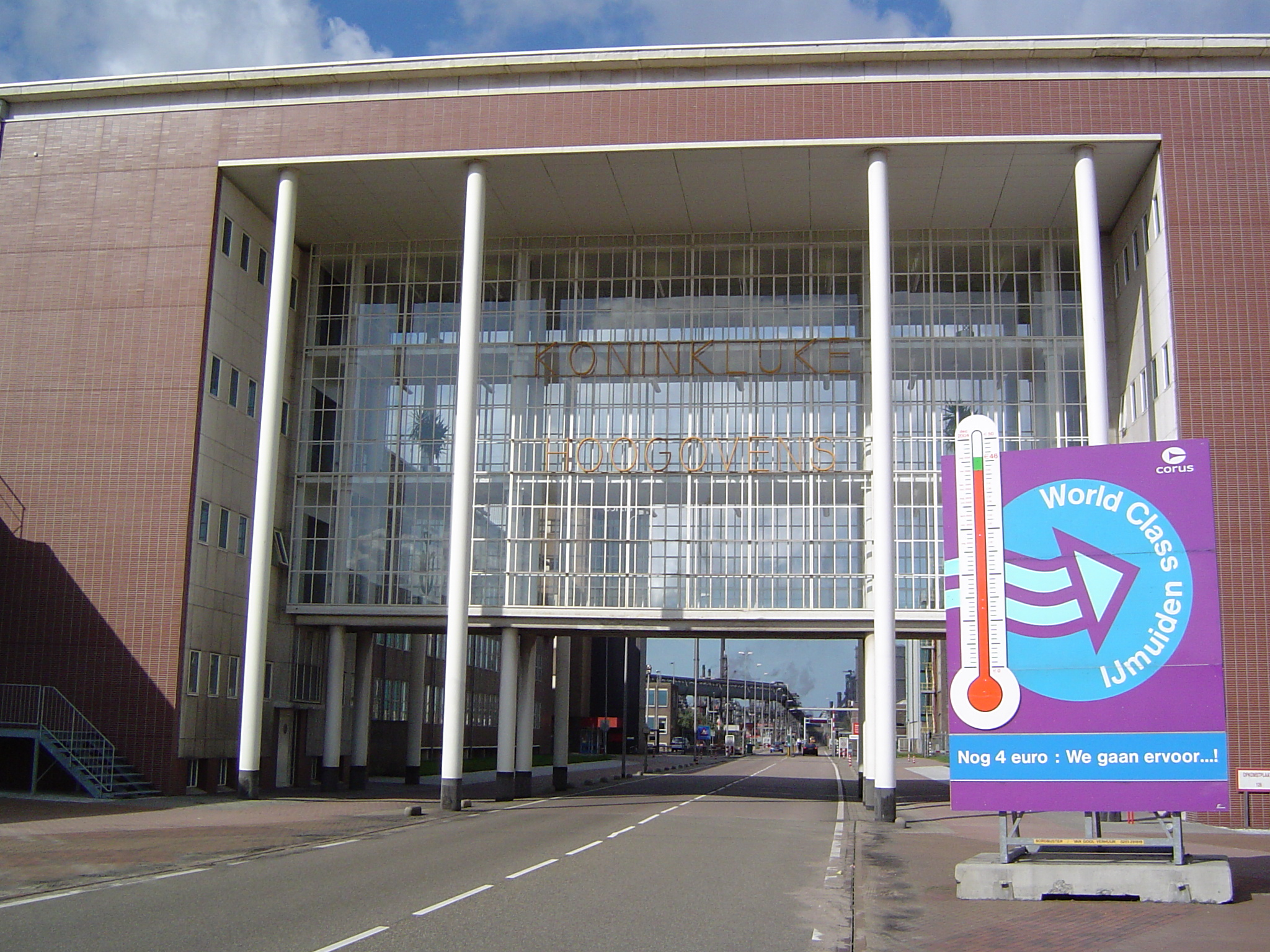
Koninklijke Hoogovens headquarters in Velsen by WM Dudok

After the end of World War II reconstruction of the Netherlands began, and as part of this process investments were made in the steelworks. A separate company, Breedband NV, was established on 19 June 1950, receiving funding from both the state and the United States, under the Marshall Plan. The project introduced hot and cold rolling mills for thin plate, of 60 and 75 thousand tonnes per year capacity respectively, and a galvanising line. All three installations were operating by the end of 1953. During the same period architect Willem Marinus Dudok was commissioned to design a head office for the company in Velsen, which was completed 1953. The Breedband project moved Hoogoven's emphasis into flat rather than long products, which continued in later decades.

During the 1950s and 1960 the facilities were extended; the plants first oxy-steel converted was put into operation in 1958, a second cold rolling line was added in 1961, electrolytic galvanising machines were added in 1958, 1962, and 1967, and hot rolling capacity had increased to 1.6 million tonnes per year by 1965. On 4 May 1965 KNHS took over the company Breedband NV. Also in the post-war period an automated casting machine was installed in 1948, two new blast furnaces activated in 1958 and 1961, and a mill for steel rod and wire production was commissioned in 1964. The sixth blast furnace began operation in 1967, and a second oxy-steel plant in 1968. In 1969 a block mill capable of handling 45-tonne blocks, and another hot strip mill with a capacity of over 3.5 million tonnes a year were opened.

Labour relations at the plant were usually good; during the first two decades of the enterprise's existence the organisational structure was relatively simple, with limited hierarchies, and there were limited attempts at a benevolent social policy by the plant's management. Psychological testing of potential workers was gradually introduced, first for skilled workers, and after World War II for unskilled workers. Vocational training was slowly introduced after 1938. In the post-war period foreign workers from Italy, Spain, Turkey, Yugoslavia and Morocco began to be employed at the plant, and in the 1960s the practice of housing foreign workers in floating hotels was begun. Post-war there was no major industrial action until 1973, when 2,300 workers went on strike at the IJmuiden plant. During the Steel crisis there were no strikes, despite significant lay-offs.

In 1972 the first two blast furnaces were decommissioned. In the same year (1972) the IJmuiden steelworks (Hoogovens IJmuiden BV) (Note: KNHS formed its interests in the steelworks that were to be merged into the company Hoogovens IJmuiden BV, source: History Steel Company (2007), "Estel is founded, 7 July 1972") were formed into a 50:50 joint venture named Estel with Hoesch of Germany as the other partner, (Note: In the late 1960s Hoogovens and Hoesch had planned to build a second Dutch steel plant in Rotterdam. The proposal was blocked by the Rotterdam council, having received opposition from the public and green groups.) which merged its Dortmund steel plant into the concern. IJmuiden, with good access to seaborn raw materials, was to act primarily as a raw steel supplier to the plant in Germany, which was closer to a large market for finished steel products. The steel crisis of the 1970s prevented any positive expansion and the company was disbanded in 1982 when funding arrangements for the loss-making Dortmund plant could not be agreed.

After the demerger from Hoesch the company required restructuring and investment: the company was producing too much raw steel with not enough semi-finished product manufacturing capacity. This led to the installation of a continuous casting, hot rolling, and steel coating lines of the next decade. The Dutch state supported the process with a loan of 570 million guilders. The workforce was reduced by 3,000 (14%) over 4 years from 1982, with the company becoming profitable again in 1984. The subsidiary Demka was also closed.

The company's first continuous caster was put into operation in May 1980. In 1990 a production line for producing paint coated steel rolls was started. The third blast furnace was decommissioned in 1991.

In the late 1990s two blast furnaces were purchased by the Indonesian steel group Gunawan Steel Group and dismantled and shipped to its development in Malaysia, Gunawan Iron and Steel. The dismantling work was carried out by a Chinese contractor which was found to be paying its 120 Chinese workers less than the Dutch minimum wage, with poor safety conditions, with 14 accidents resulting in 2 fatalities due to falls from height. The Chinese contractor was fined for breaches of safety practice, and made to improve working conditions, as well as retrospectively paying its workers 15,000 guilders.

In 1996 the company changed its official name to Koninklijke Hoogovens. A new continuous caster was installed between 1998 and 2000.

In 1998 a joint subsidiary with Sidmar, named Galtec, was established at Sidmar's plant near Ghent, producing galvanised steel.

In 1998 Hoogovens employed around 23,000 people, and produced approximately 8 million tonnes of steel (and 450,000 tonnes of aluminium) per year, with sales of over $10 billion. The company's main products were rolled steel, including tinplate (thin gauge steel), coated steels, and aluminium extrusions. Production was distributed 20% in the Dutch market, 60% in the rest of Europe and 20% to the rest of the world.

==== 1999–2007: Corus group ownership ====
In June 1999 British Steel plc and Hoogovens announced that they intended to merge, which would make the combined company—provisionally named BSKH—the world's third-largest steel producer with an aggregate worldwide turnover of approximately €15.127 billion. Upon completion, Hoogovens shareholders would own 38.3% of the new company.

Because of the size of the two companies, and the extent of their competition within the European Economic Community, the merger required the approval of the Commission of the European Communities; this was granted in mid-July of the same year, and on 6 October 1999 the merger was completed. The new name for the joint company, Corus, had been announced the month before.

Because British Steel had been the significantly larger of the two companies in both workforce and market capitalisation, some observers characterised the merger as being more akin to a takeover of Hoogovens by British Steel. Analysts noted that expanding its market share in Europe by means of the merger would help insulate British Steel against the strength of the sterling relative to the euro, which had been harming British Steel's exports.

In 2000 a hot dip galvanising line Galtec 2, with a capacity of 400,000 tonnes per year of zinc coated coil began operation; it was the second to be produced as part of a joint venture with Sidmar. A joint venture (42.5%) Galstar LP with Weirton Steel for another galvanising line built in the late 1990s in Jeffersonville, Indiana, USA entered bankruptcy in 2001 having been closed due to poor demand after only 4 months in production. (Note: Later renamed GalvPro, the joint venture became bankrupt in 2001, The plant was acquired by Steel Dynamics in 2003.)

Plans for the construction of an (€223 million) additional hot dip galvanising line and cold rolling mill were made in 2005, for an expected completion in 2008.

==== 2007–present: Tata Steel ownership ====
In 2007 Tata Steel acquired Corus and subsequently renamed it Tata Steel Europe in 2010.

In 2008 due to lack of demand the Corus steel group cut production by 20%; in IJmuiden one blast furnace was taken out of production.

During the Great Recession, the downturn led to significant job losses – 800 persons in 2009, and a further 1000 jobs were lost by 2014. In the 2014/2015 financial year the IJmuiden site made a profit of c. €340 million, resulting a 9.19% bonus to the workforce, then numbering c. 8000 to 9000 persons.

In 2021, Tata Steel Europe ceased to exists after it was split into a British and a Dutch branch. Tata Steel Netherlands (TSN) and Tata Steel UK fall directly under the Indian parent company Tata Steel. The plant itself is still named Tata Steel IJmuiden.

=== Aluminium production ===
In 1964 a joint venture with Hoogovens as major (50%) partner established an aluminium company Aldel in the north east of the Netherlands; the enterprise was backed by the state which guaranteed a long term supply of energy a low price: a large natural gas discovery had been made in the region. Mining company Billiton was the other partner in the venture, along with technical support from Alusuisse. (Note: Hoogovens acquired Billiton's share in the joint venture in 1977.)

In 1970 the company acquired a shareholding in Sidal (Belgium), and in 1987 Kaiser Aluminium's European business was acquired; the acquisition made KNHS a major aluminium producer: by 1996 it had an aluminium smelting capacity of well over 10 million tonnes per annum.

==== Corus period ====
Divisions in the board of Corus arose in 2002 when the company announced it was to sell its profitable aluminium business to Pechiney for over £500 million; Corus's British division was making a loss at this time and the sale was seen by Dutch interests as being used to prop up the loss-making British interests with no backward investment in the European mainland side of the business. The board of Corus Netherlands vetoed the sale.

In 2006 Corus's aluminium rolling and extrusion facilities were sold to Aleris. In 2009 smelters in Delfzijl (Netherlands) and Voerde (Germany) were sold to Briand Investments B.V., an associate of Klesch, a large commodity trader. This ended the businesses' association with aluminium, leaving it primarily as a steel producer.

=== Subsidiaries and joint ventures ===
Demka, an earlier Dutch steel producer became a KNHS subsidiary in 1964, the company was shut down in 1984.

Mekog and CEMIJ were established at the IJmuiden site in 1928 and 1930, manufacturing fertiliser, and cement respectively, using steel production by products. CEMIJ was sold off in 1989. A shareholding in coal tar distillation plant Cindu (Chemische Industrie Uithoorn), then named Teerbedrijf Uithoorn, was acquired in 1927; the plant used tar produced as a by-product of coke production. In 2010 Cindu Chemicals BV was sold to Koppers Holding Inc. (Koppers).

The welded tubes factory in Zwijndrecht was acquired at the end of 1995 from Van Leeuwen Buizen (see also Van Leeuwen Pipe and Tube Group). In 2011 a €3million investment was made into the factory improving facilities for manufacturing tube steel for car chassis construction.

In 1983 the company, Sidmar and Phenix Works reached agreement on a joint venture SEGAL (Société Européenne de Galvanisation) at Ivoz-Ramet, Liège, Belgium which would produce hot dip galvanized steel for the car industry. The shares of the company were wholly owned by Corus by 2004.

Metal plating company Hille and Muller became a wholly owned subsidiary in 1997, after acquiring a 50% share acquired in 1988.

A 50% share in Belgian steelmaker Usine Gustave Boël (UGB) in La Louvière was acquired in 1997 (as a joint venture HB Holding,), with option to buy the remaining shares. The UGB subsidiary Fabrique de Fer de Maubeuge (FFM) was also acquired, and renamed 'Myriad'. Governmental financing for rescue investment in UGB La Louvière could not be agreed and the plant was sold to Duferco in 1999.

The company also participated in north sea gas exploration and extraction company Nordwinning Group (1960s), its interests were sold off in 1988.

== Heritage ==
SIEHO (Stichting Industrieel Erfgoed Hoogovens, English: Hoogovens industrial heritage foundation) is dedicated to the history of the plant, and runs the Hoogovens Museum which is an affiliate of the European Route of Industrial Heritage. Corus Stoom IJmuiden (Steam Corus IJmuiden) operates steam trains on the rail network of the CIJmuiden and has workshop facilities on site.

== See also ==
- HIsarna steelmaking process, primary steel production process invented at Hoogovens
- Tata Steel Chess Tournament, formerly the Hoogovens chess tournament, started 1938
