= IJmuiden =

- Town
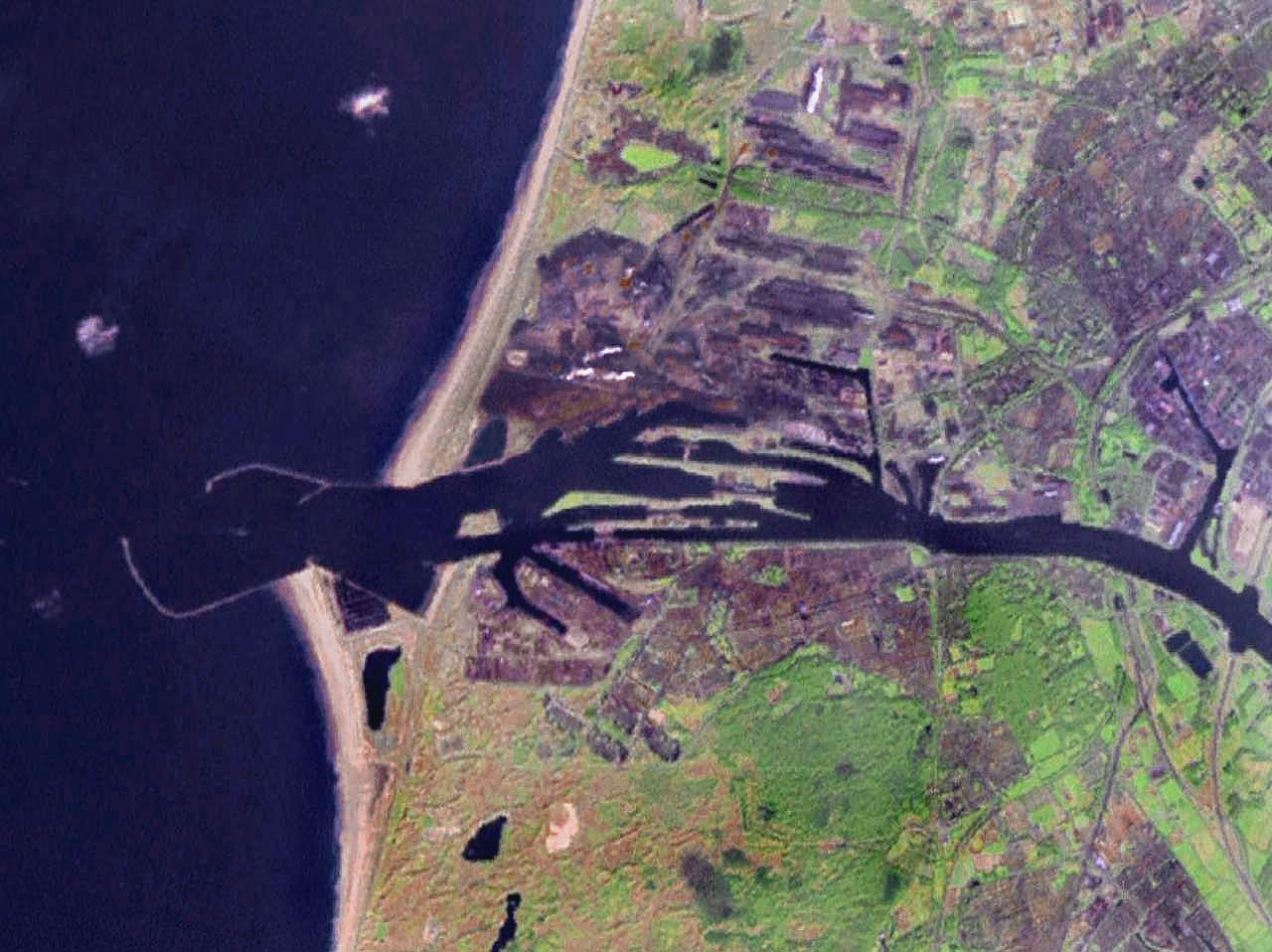
- Satellite photo of IJmuiden and Velsen area

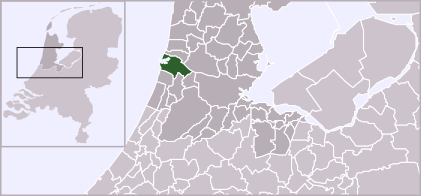
- Within North Holland; and the Netherlands (inset, left)

- IJmuiden in the municipality of Velsen
- Coordinates: 52°27′31″N 4°37′10″E
- Country: Netherlands
- Province: North Holland
- Municipality: Velsen

Area
  - Total: 12.91 km^{2} (4.98 sq mi)
- Elevation: 1.9 m (6.2 ft)

Population (2023)
  - Total: 32,360
  - Density: 2,507/km^{2} (6,492/sq mi)
- Time zone: UTC+1 (CET)
  - Summer (DST): UTC+2 (CEST)
- Postal code: 1970-1976
- Dialing code: 0255

IJmuiden (Dutch pronunciation: [ɛiˈmœydə(n)]; sometimes Ÿmuiden) is a port town in the Dutch province of North Holland. It is the main town in the municipality of Velsen which lies mainly to the south-east. Including its large sea locks, it straddles the mouth of the North Sea Canal to Amsterdam. To the south it abuts a large reserve of plant-covered dunes, the Zuid-Kennemerland National Park. The town is on the south bank; the north bank is otherwise a steel plant and Velsen-Noord.

It is 10 kilometres (6 mi) north northwest of Haarlem which is 18 kilometres (11 mi) due west of Amsterdam.

The port is a deepwater port suited to fully laden Panamax ships, and the fourth port of the Netherlands.

The internal capitalization within IJmuiden as IJ is a digraph in modern Dutch with an exceptional spelling convention. Also, in some typefaces, IJ is recognised as a ligature and is placed in one typed or handwritten space.

== History ==
In the Roman era, the district was already inhabited, and archaeological finds at the impoldered lake of Wijkermeer indicate there was a North Sea port of some regional importance built at Velsen. Present day IJmuiden includes four harbors: the vissershaven (Ship's code IJM), a fishing dock (visafslag), the haringhaven, the IJmondhaven and the Seaport Marina IJmuiden, a harbour for pleasure craft. IJmuiden became the largest fishing port of the Netherlands after the island of Urk became closed in by the Afsluitdijk. The town suffered heavy damage and demolition during World War II, because of its maritime importance.

=== IJ-mouth ===
Before IJmuiden was built, the area was known as Breesaap, a desolate plain where a handful of farming families strove to make a living.

Plans to connect Amsterdam with a canal to the North Sea, with its mouth in this area, had been drawn up already since 1626, but were only set into motion in the 19th century, when in 1851 the whole area was sold to the entrepreneurs Adrianus Bik and Jan Arnold. Ground was broken on 8 April 1865.

IJmuiden is the newest city in North Holland. It was founded on 1 November 1876, when the North Sea Canal was officially opened by William III of the Netherlands, shortcutting Amsterdam's harbours' passage to the sea. He dubbed the town IJmuiden after passing the locks from the North Sea into the canal. After his ship, the paddle steamer Stad Breda built by the Stoomvaart Maatschappij Zeeland, passed, the first ship from Amsterdam, the SS Rembrandt built by the Royal Netherlands Steamship Company (KNSM), passed the other way. The workers who dug the canal later settled there; they found work after the canal was finished in the fishing industry, but many also suffered extreme poverty.

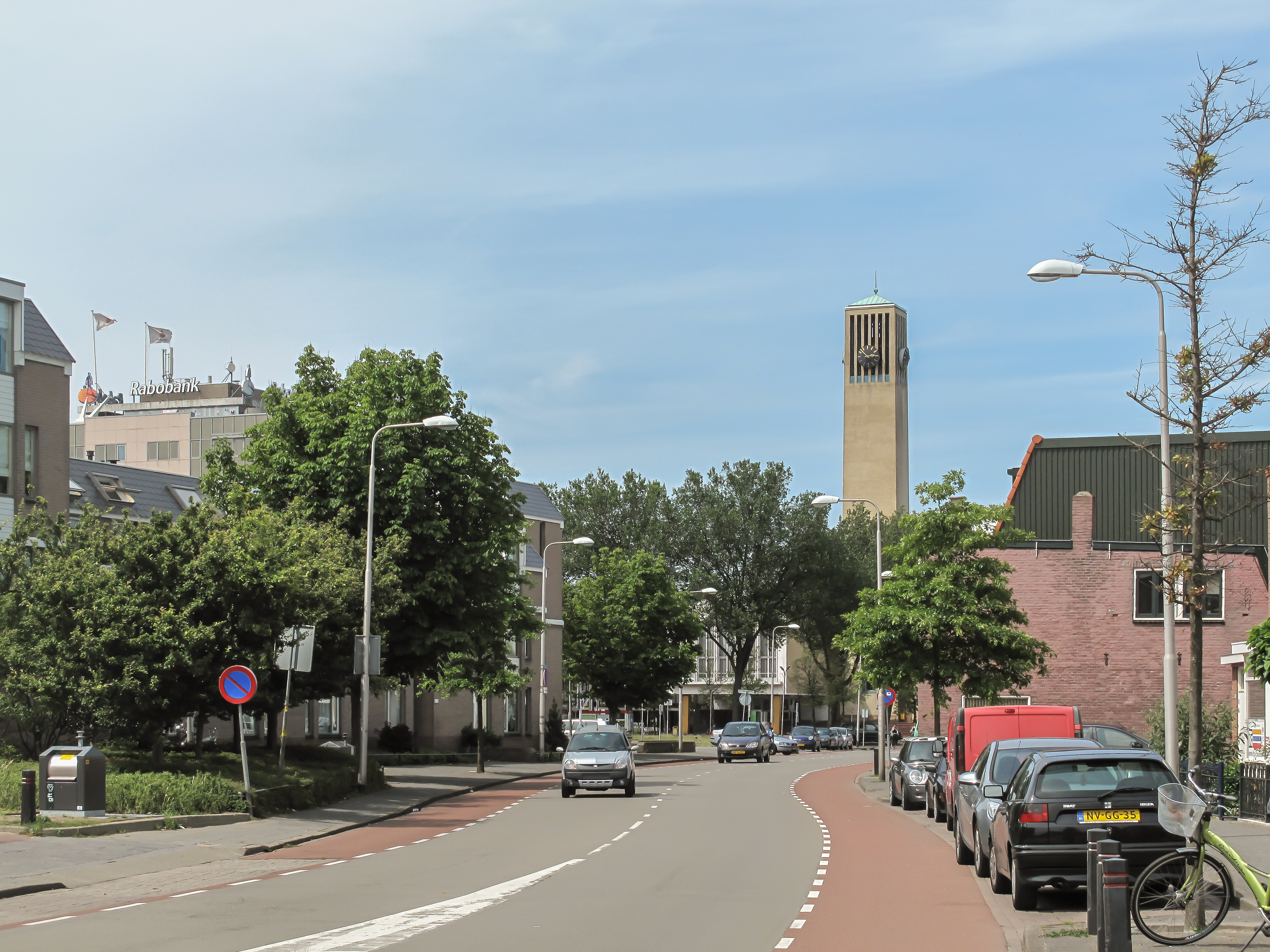
IJmuiden, view to a street (town hall at the background)

The IJmuiden name literally means "mouth of the IJ", which is a hint to the importance the town has for the Amsterdam harbour. The name first appeared, as IJ-muiden, in lines written in 1848 by the professor and journalist (and, later, a liberal finance minister in the Van Lynden van Sandenburg Cabinet) Simon Vissering. The present IJmuiden form was eventually adopted in 1876, as the North Sea Canal was being completed in this section.

In 1890 it had about 1,500 inhabitants, but boomed when the Koninklijke Nederlandse Hoogovens steelworks settled in IJmuiden in 1918. At that time shipping was at a low, because during World War I minesweepers laid mines nearby. The entry to the canal needed constant dredging due to the littoral drift in both directions on an open, sandy coast: due to winds blowing alternately from opposite quarters, sand accumulates in the sheltered angles outside the harbour between each converging breakwater and the shore.

=== Second World War ===
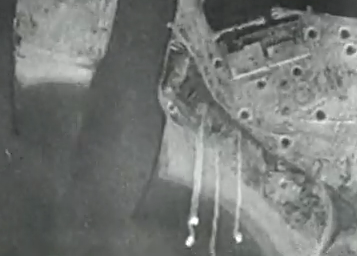
Still taken from a United States Army film, shot during the bombing of the German bunker Schnellbootbunker BY (SBB2), February 1945.

After the German invasion of the Netherlands on 10 May 1940, the Dutch Royal family left the country from IJmuiden in the late evening of 12 May. Some were on board the British destroyer HMS Codrington, while Queen Wilhelmina left on board HMS Hereward. The quays at IJmuiden were crowded at that time with people desperate to be transported across the channel, sometimes at great expense. During the Nazi German occupation, the canal was out of operation and the Germans destroyed most of IJmuiden to create what they called Festung IJmuiden (literally "fortress", a heavily defended zone, from which the civilian population had been removed.

IJmuiden became the site of two separate fortified pens constructed by the German navy (Kriegsmarine) to house their schnellboote (fast torpedo boats, known to the Allies as E-boats) and Biber midget submarines. The older structure, codename Schnellbootbunker AY (SBB1), was protected by a 10-foot (3.0 m) thick concrete roof. The newer one, codename Schnellbootbunker BY (SBB2), had 10–12 feet (3.0–3.7 m) of concrete, with a further 2–4-foot (0.6–1.2 m) layer separated by an air–gap. (Note: Only SBB2 has remained until today (52°27′36.72″N 4°34′39.08″E).)

The E-boats laid up in the shelters during the day, safe from air attack, and put to sea under cover of night to attack Allied shipping. The pens were priority targets after D-day as the torpedo boats they protected were a great threat to the supply lines serving Allied forces. They were subjected to repeated air attack. This included four attacks by No. 9 Squadron and No. 617 Squadron of the Royal Air Force. These saw 53 five-ton, Tallboy earthquake bombs dropped. There were also two attacks in 1945 by the American air force with rocket-powered Disney bombs, specialist weapons designed to penetrate fortified, concrete bunkers that could resist conventional bombs. IJmuiden was liberated by the Allies on 4 May 1945.

The story of IJmuiden during the war is told in the Bunker Museum IJmuiden (in Dutch). The city is also mentioned in The Diary of Anne Frank.

== North Holland's gate to the North Sea ==
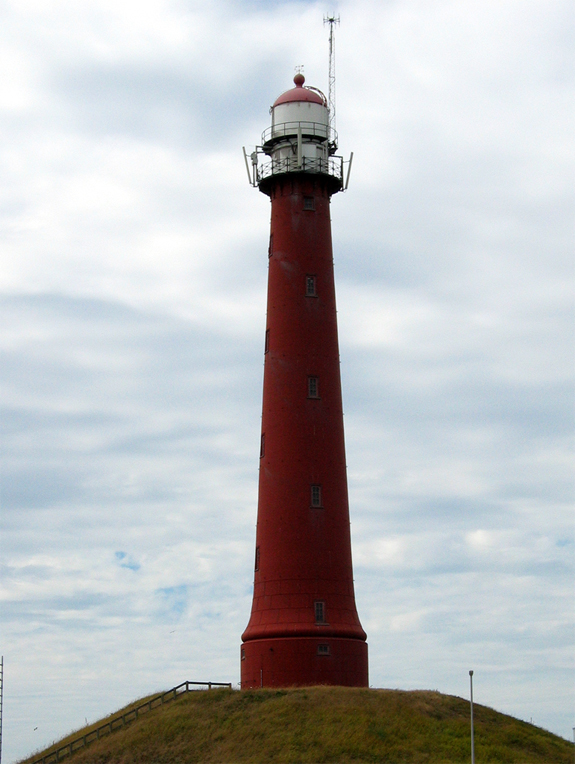
IJmuiden's Rear Range lighthouse

After the war, the town was rebuilt according to a plan by the architect Willem Marinus Dudok. The statistical area IJmuiden, which includes the surrounding countryside, has a population of 30,466. The headquarters of the KNRM, Royal Netherlands Sea Rescue Institution is against the canal. The harbour coastline remains a measuring point for the northern extremes of the equidistantly set UK-Netherlands sea boundary. The law discounts the projection of Europoort, the natural end of which, Hook of Holland (Hoek van Holland), forms a southern measurement point.

The North Sea Canal connects the North Sea with the IJ Bay in Amsterdam, and the importance of this ship canal has been recognized with the introduction of the "Holland Route" along the canal by the European Route of Industrial Heritage (ERIH). The places to see on this route are the Hoogovensmuseum, the system of sluice gates at the mouth of the canal, and the Zee- en Havenmuseum in IJmuiden. IJmuiden is home to two of the world's most powerful water pumps capable of pumping 60,000 litres (13,000 imp gal; 16,000 US gal) per second.

Besides the Velsen Municipality Hall (Raadhuis van de gemeente Velsen), designed by the architect Willem Dudok as a centerpiece to his plan for a new IJmuiden, important sights in IJmuiden are the North Sea locks. The latter are among the largest in the world and one set is able to close off a shipping lane 50 metres (160 ft) wide and 12 metres (39 ft) deep. There are plans to enlarge or build a new set to facilitate passage for even larger vessels.

DFDS Seaways operate a route between Amsterdam and Newcastle (Port of Tyne) via IJmuiden. A new roll-on/roll-off ferry route between IJmuiden and Great Yarmouth in the United Kingdom was considered. Any plans in that direction appear to have been abandoned by the relevant authorities.

The North Sea Race is a yacht race which takes place annually. The event covers a distance of 210 nautical miles (390 km; 240 mi) and starts in Scarborough, North Yorkshire, in England and finishes in IJmuiden.

== Gallery ==
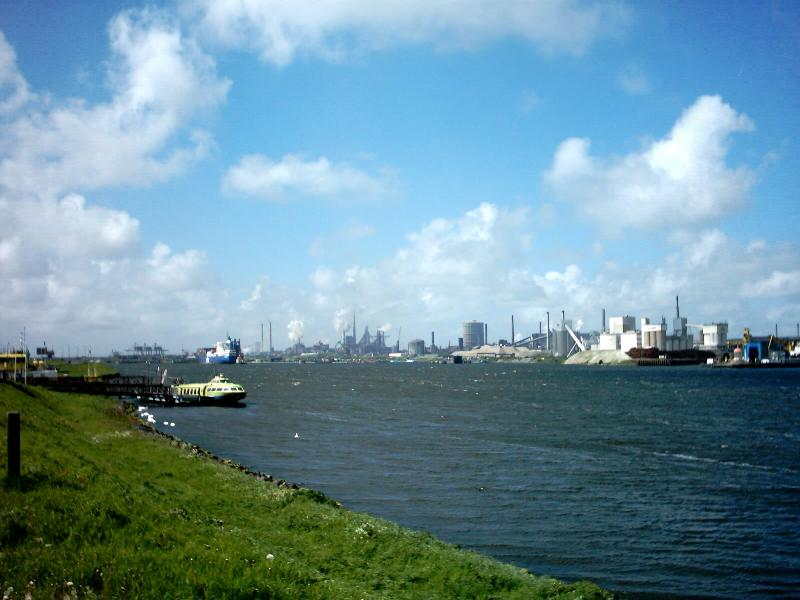
North Sea Canal's wide mouth

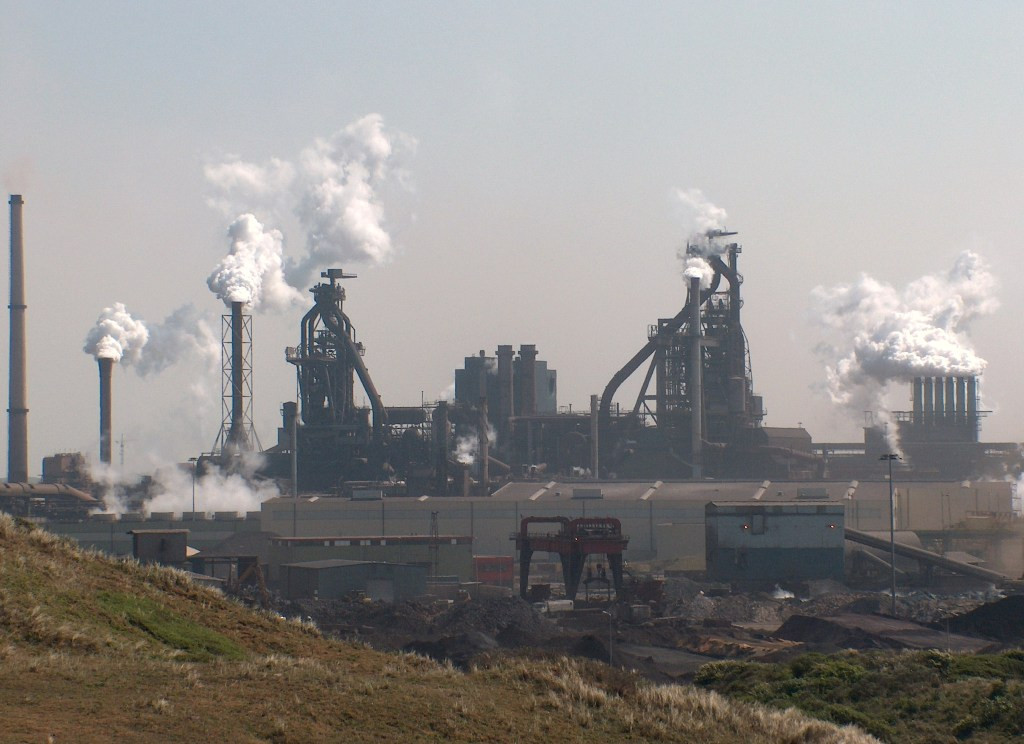
IJmuiden steelworks is a key actor for the IJ

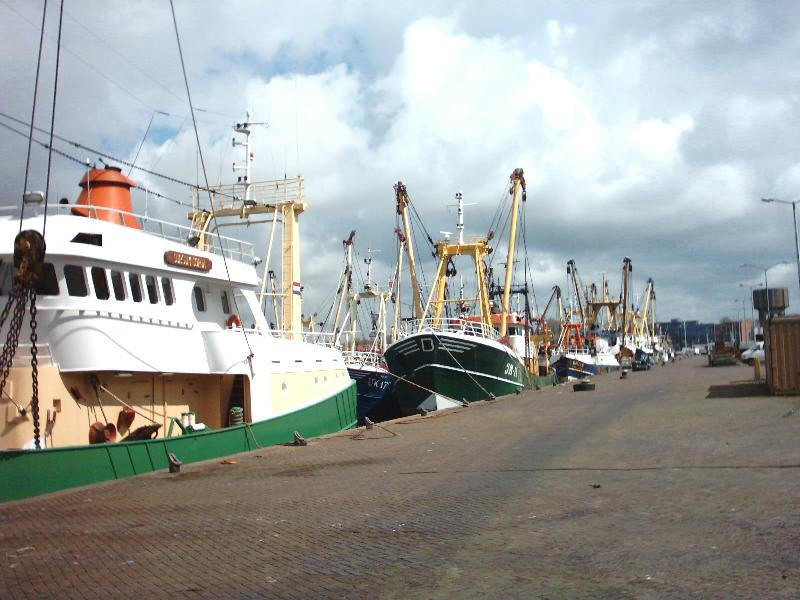
Fishing boats at quay in IJmuiden

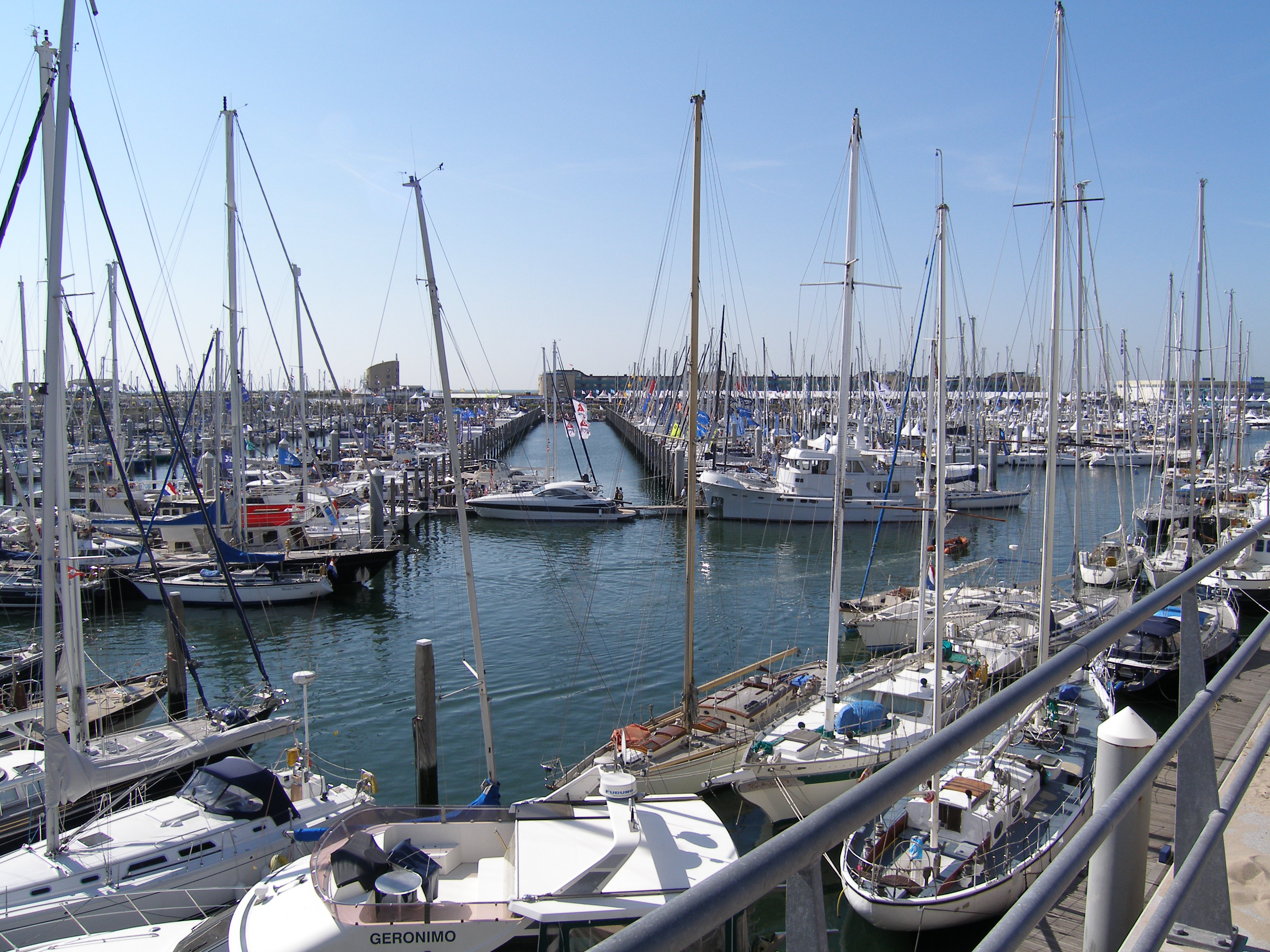
IJmuiden's marina

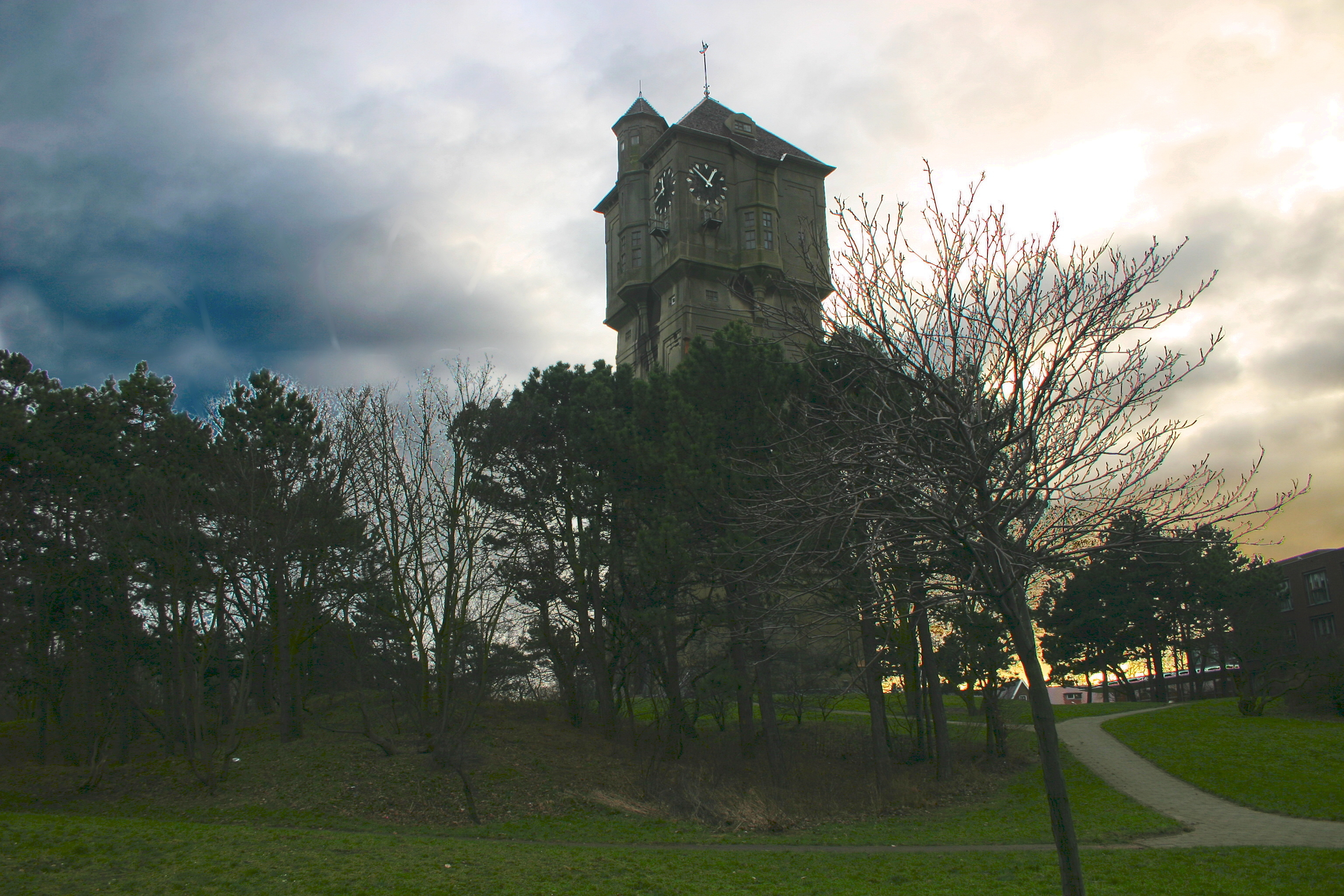
Old water tower

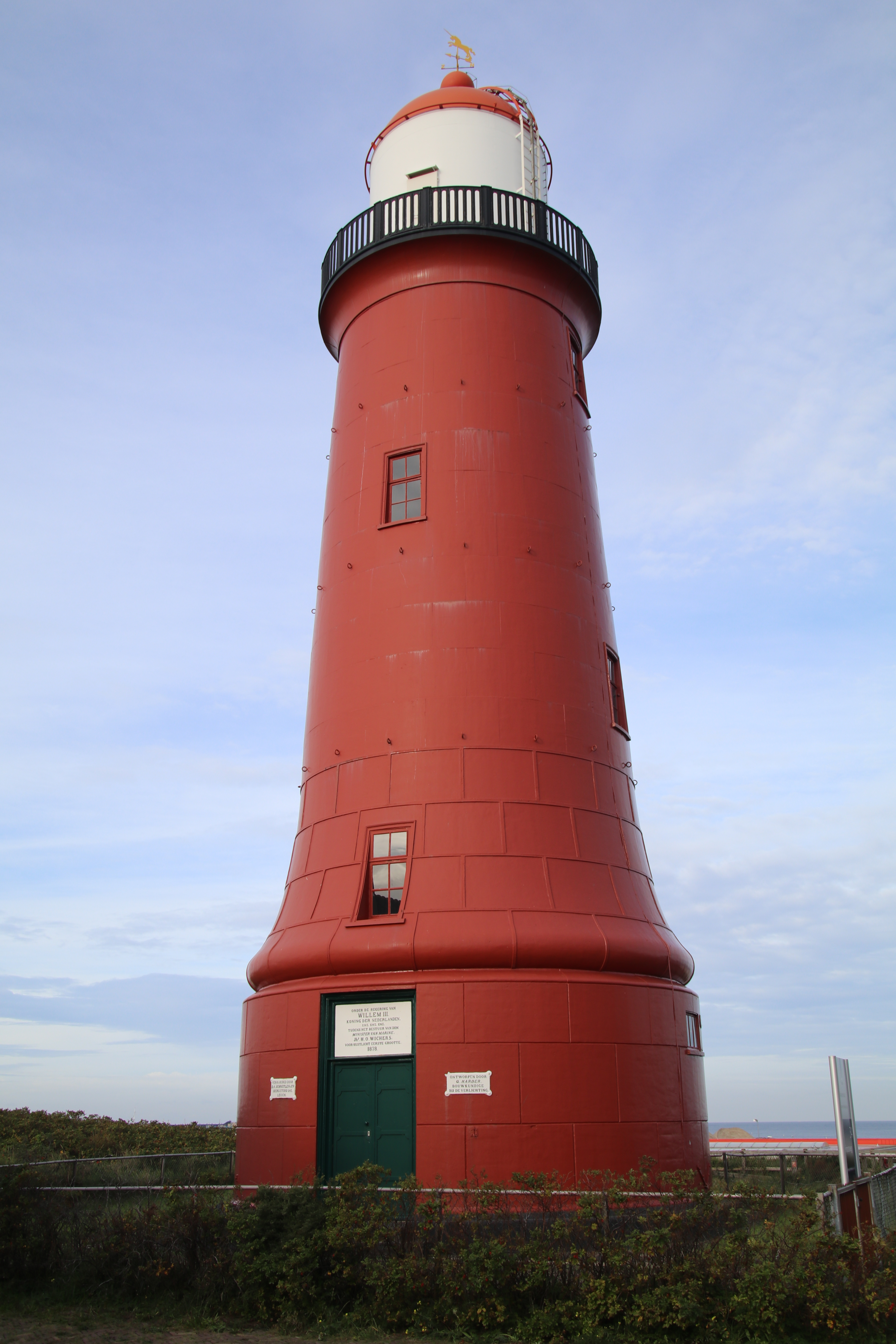
Low lighthouse of IJmuiden
