= Herbert von Bismarck (1884–1955) =

- Born: Herbert Otto Rudolf von Bismarck; 29 August 1884; Stettin, German Empire
- Died: 30 March 1955 (aged 70)
- Occupations: Prussian government legal officer Land owner-farmer Politician; Member of the Prussian state Landtag (parliament); Member of the Reichstag (national parliament); Secretary of State at the Prussian Interior Ministry; Spokesman for the Pommersche Landsmannschaft
- Political party: DNVP
- Spouse: Maria von Kleist-Retzow (1893–1979)
- Children: 8
- Parents: Philipp von Bismarck (1844–1894) (father); Hedwig von Harnier (1858–1945) (mother)

Herbert Otto Rudolf von Bismarck (29 August 1884 – 30 March 1955) was a German lawyer and politician. In 1930 he switched to national politics, serving between 1930 and 1933 as a Member of the Reichstag in Berlin. He represented the conservative-nationalist German National People's Party (DNVP). During a couple of months at the start of 1933 he served very briefly as secretary of state at the Prussian Interior Ministry before being placed in "temporary retirement". After the war he returned to public life between 1948 and 1952 as the first spokesman for the new Pommersche Landsmannschaft, an association created to represent the interests of those who had been expelled from their homes in Pomerania (most of which had now become part of Poland).

The Herbert von Bismarck described here was a great nephew to Chancellor Otto von Bismarck, the architect of German unification. Sources not infrequently conflate or confuse Herbert von Bismarck (1884–1955) with his first cousin once removed, Herbert von Bismarck (1849–1904).

== Life ==
=== Provenance and early years ===
Bismarck was born at Stettin, a sea port which at that time was the administrative capital of the Prussian province of Pomerania. He was born into the Protestant Bismarck family, and thereby from a prominent branch of the aristocracy. His father, Philipp von Bismarck (1844–1894) was a Prussian landowner who also served at various times as an army officer, and then, during the final five years of his life, as a member of the Prussian state parliament. His grandfather, Bernhard von Bismarck (1810–1893, had been the eldest brother of Chancellor Otto von Bismarck. Little is known of his mother, born Hedwig von Harnier (1858–1945), who also came from a traditionalist land-owning family, and who was his father's second wife. Herbert von Bismarck was the youngest of his father's three recorded sons. He was just 10 when his father died. A few years later, in 1899, Herbert was formally adopted as a foster child of the redoubtable and recently widowed Countess Ruth von Kleist-Retzow, in whose family apartment in Stettin he and his brother Gottfried were by now living, together with the Countess and her own children.

He attended the König-Wilhelm-Gymnasium (secondary school) in Stettin, passing his school completion exams in 1903. He was described as a studious and intelligent student with an exceptional talent for sport. Between 1903 and 1906, he attended the Ludwig-Maximilians-Universität München, the University of Lausanne, and the Friedrich Wilhelm University of Berlin. He studied various aspects of Jurisprudence including Medical jurisprudence. There is also a reference to his having studied the History of Diplomacy. He then returned home to Pomerania where, according to one source, he obtained a doctorate in Contract Law from the University of Greifswald. In 1906, having passed the necessary Prussian state law exams (Level I), he embarked on a two-year period as a "Gerichtsreferendar" (trainee lawyer). He then served between 1908 and 1912, first in Stettin and then in Pyritz, as a "Regierungsreferendar", a trainee for senior government service, also passing a further set of state law exams (Level II) in 1912. In 1912, he was posted to Silesia, far to the south, accepting a position as a "Regierungsassessor" (judicial assistant) for the Frankenstein district administration, in the hill country south of Breslau. It was also in 1912 that on 16 February Herbert von Bismarck married Maria von Kleist-Retzow (1893–1959), a daughter of his former foster mother.

=== Government service ===
Von Bismarck's career in the Prussian government justice service was interrupted by the outbreak, in July 1914, of the First World War, in which he served as a soldier in the field between August 1914 and May 1918. By the time he was withdrawn from active service he had reached the rank of Oberleutnant in the Military Reserve. Between May 1918 and November 1918, he was assigned to Spa where the emperor had installed himself with his top military commanders in order to be closer to the critical fighting on the western front, the situation on the eastern front having been ""satisfactorily resolved". Von Bismarck's role was as an assistant to the chancellor's representative at the Main Headquarters.

Between December 1918 and March 1931, von Bismarck worked in a senior regional administrative position as "Landrat" for the Regenwalde Rural District in Pomerania. He pursued a parallel career in agriculture, managing the family estates on the edge of Lasbeck, a village in the same district. During 1930/31, as national politics became more polarised, von Bismarck became increasingly involved in party politics, as an activist member of the National People's Party ("Deutschnationale Volkspartei" / DNVP). His growing political involvement required temporary resignation from his post as "Landrat" in 1931 under Prussian legal provisions in place at the time. During 1931, he also faced a lawsuit lodged by the Prussian state government, seeking to have his removal from public office made permanent. This was because he campaigned in that year's referendum for the dissolution of the Prussian state parliament. The referendum campaign had been launched on the initiative of the "Stahlhelm" army veterans' association which was a pro-monarchist and - many thought - anti-democratic organisation. It was sometimes characterised as a para-military wing of the DNVP for young people. In lending the lustre of the "Bismarck" name to the campaign initiated by the traditionalist army veterans, von Bismarck was also lining up alongside the Communist Party and the National Socialist Party, both of which were shunned through this period by the various centrist parties, most of which were uncompromising in their democratic commitment.

=== Reichstag member ===
In 1930, Herbert von Bismarck secured election to the Reichstag in Berlin. Representing Voting District 6 (Pomerania) he sat as a DNVP member. Across Germany the party had lost out badly in the 1930 election, as economically stressed voters attracted by extremist right-wing populism switched their party allegiance to the rising star of Adolf Hitler's National Socialists, but in Pomerania and East Prussia the DNVP narrowly remained the party with the largest proportion of votes cast, with 24.8% of the total. Von Bismarck was re-elected in July 1932 and again in November 1932.

=== Bismarckbund ===
As a DNVP Reichstag member, von Bismarck's conservative-traditionalist approach was not in question. He appears to have made little significant impact as a member of it, and indeed the Reichstag itself had been left deadlocked after 1930, and became increasingly side-lined. Together Communists and the National Socialists had sufficient votes to block parliamentary business, but neither would have contemplated any coalition or other co-operation with Social Democrats or Conservative centrists. To the extent that government was able to function at all, it did so through "emergency decrees". Von Bismarck's more significant political activism during the early 1930s was also undertaken without reference to the Reichstag. In December 1931 he was elected chairman of what increasingly came to be known as the "Bismarckbund" ("Bismarck Association"). The organisation's founder and former chairman, Hermann Otto Sieveking, had died suddenly in September 1931. The Bismarckbund's official name was "Bismarckjugend", and it operated as the youth wing of the DNVP. Sieveking had been a "hands-on" chairman, and shortly after von Bismarck took on the Bismarckbund chairmanship the DNVP party leader, Alfred Hugenberg also arranged for him to be elected DNVP "Reichsjugendführer". This had the effect of drawing the party and the Bismarckbund even more closely together. Some have characterised the development as a simple merger between the DNVP and its (already closely aligned) youth wing. For von Bismarck personally, one effect was that he automatically became a member of the DNVP's party executive, simply by virtue of his chairmanship of the Bismarckbund. The Bismarckbund under von Bismarck's leadership acquired a distinctly "völkisch" (populist-nationalist romanticist-nostalgic) world view which will have appealed not just to the young people, but also to many older DNVP supporters. The other significant change under Bismarck's leadership was that the Bismarckbund became a purely combat-focused organisation, in possible anticipation of a time when restrictions on the size of the German army imposed at Versailles in 1919 might be relaxed (or simply set aside). Even under Sieveking's leadership, the Bismarckbund had incorporated powerful para-military elements which might have been considered slightly odd in the youth wing of a political party operating under a democratic constitution; but changes under von Bismarck made these aspects strikingly more explicit.

Given that Bismarck was clearly no Communist, Socialist, nor even any sort of a political centrist, and in view of his leadership record of militarising the Bismarckbund, there might have been those, at the time, who hoped that the organisation might be permitted to endure. In the event, it was dissolved following a government determination dated 21 June 1933. There was only room for one youth organisation in Hitler's Germany, and that was to be the "Hitlerjugend", under the leadership of Reichsjugendführer Baldur von Schirach.

=== Twelve years of Hitler ===
In January 1933, through a combination of cunning and determination, the Hitler government took power, ending long months of political paralysis. They arrived in government with a clear agenda, and now lost little time in transforming Germany into a one-party dictatorship. Von Bismarck seems never to have been a party member, but he had on a number of occasions expressed his sympathy with the aspirations of the Hitlerites, and on 1 February 1933 he took up an appointment as secretary of state at the Prussian Interior Ministry. The appointment had been agreed during the eight week chancellorship of Kurt von Schleicher which came to an end, formally, on 28 January 1933. It might have marked the start of a more prominent political position in the new Germany than he had ever achieved under the old German democracy. That was not how matters turned out, however. Throughout his life, von Bismarck had stood for old-fashioned conservative nationalism: his political instincts were far to the right of what would have been seen, before 1933, as the political mainstream. However, the Prussian statist traditions to which he adhered also implied an unquestioning constitutional understanding of politics. That led to conflict with the newly installed acting Reichsstatthalter and Prussian Minister President Hermann Göring who, like other members of Hitler's inner circle, took a flagrantly "a la carte" approach to the rule of law. National Socialist leaders repeatedly acted in contravention of the constitution, and Secretary of State von Bismarck repeatedly raised objections when he came across instances of this. Herbert requested Göring to put an end to the use of such methods. Von Bismarck tried to gain support from those whom he took to be like-minded traditional constitutionalists, such as Vice-Chancellor von Papen, DNVP leader Alfred Hugenberg and Defence Minister Werner von Blomberg, but beyond drawing the attention of the new party establishment to his unfashionable belief in constitutional adherence, his canvassing achieved nothing. Secretary of State von Bismarck was placed in "temporary retirement" on 10 April 1933.

Von Bismarck still did not immediately abandon his public service ambitions. In 1934 he attempted to take over as local government president for the Köslin district in succession to Curt Cronau. Cronau had decided to retire "on grounds of old age", having reached the age of 64. Bismarck's application failed, however, following an intervention from the influential Pomeranian Agricultural League and in the light of the exceptionally tense relationship which he had by now developed with party officials. He now returned to the family lands at Lasbeck and concentrated on managing the farm estates.

The outbreak of war in September 1939 drew von Bismarck back to military service. He served as a major in the army reserve.

During the summer of 1939 Luitgarde von Bismarck (1914–2000), the eldest of the three daughters of Herbert and Maria von Bismarck, married Fabian von Schlabrendorff (1907–1980), another member of the minor land-owning aristocracy and, like his father-in-law, a trained lawyer who found himself serving as an army officer when war came. Herbert von Bismarck and Fabian von Schlabrendorff were already on friendly terms. During von Bismarck's ten weeks as Secretary of State at the Prussian Interior Ministry during 1933, von Schlabrendorff had been employed as his assistant. In addition to links of friendship and family, von Bismarck and von Schlabrendorff were jointly engaged in anti-government resistance, although few details have surfaced. A pivotal moment in the resistance narrative was the 20 July plot to assassinate Hitler which only narrowly failed. Von Schlabrendorff was a member of the group that planned and executed the plot, and probably only survived the aftermath because of an American bomb that landed on the court room in which he was due to stand trial on 21 December 1944. Von Schlabrendorff as in side room awaiting his turn at the time. After the trial he was extensively debriefed by U.S. Intelligence on matters involving senior German army personnel, and a certain amount concerning his own resistance involvement subsequently emerged. As far as von Bismarck is concerned, it is known that he was summarily dismissed from army service on 15 August 1944, three and a half weeks after the failed assassination attempt: from this, commentators infer that the German security services knew or strongly suspected that von Bismarck was somehow associated with the plotters. However, he was not caught up in the mass-arrests that followed overnight on 22/23 August 1944, nor subsequently, indicating a reluctance on the part of the authorities to confront the Bismarck legacy and/or an absence of hard evidence against him.

=== Later years ===
After World War II, Herbert von Bismarck and his family fled to the west in the context of the ethnic cleansings of 1944/46. Stettin and the surrounding region were resettled by Polish refugees from formerly Eastern Polish territories that had now been incorporated into the Soviet Union. The Bismarck family was expelled from their farm estates during 1945 and ended up in Wiesbaden, close to the administrative heart of the American occupation zone and part of what became, in 1949, the Federal Republic of Germany. He involved himself in organisations dedicated to supporting German "homeland expellees" from the east. Bismarck was a co-founder of the Pommersche Landsmannschaft, an association that focused on refugees from Pomerania. He was formally elected as the organisation's official spokesman on 30/31 July 1949, although informally he had by that time already been filling the role for a number of months. He resigned the position on health ground in June 1952.
