= Reinhold Quaatz =

Germany politician

Reinhold Quaatz (born 8 May 1876 in Berlin – died 15 August 1953 in West Berlin) was a German conservative politician who was active during the Weimar Republic. Although associated with right-wing and völkisch tendencies, Quaatz was of half-Jewish ancestry.

Quaatz, a member of the Reichstag, was first elected in 1920 for the German People's Party (DVP) before he switched to the German National People's Party (DNVP). He retained his seat until the establishment of the Nazi regime. He had been a member of the Nationalliberale Vereinigung, a landowners' group that was affiliated with the DVP and also included the likes of Johann Becker, Moritz Klönne, Albert Vögler and Alfred Gildemeister, but he then clashed with the leadership and switched to the DNVP in early 1924. As a result, Quaatz ran on the DNVP ticket from the May 1924 election onward.

As a DNVP member, Quaatz was personally close to party leader Alfred Hugenberg. The media baron frequently confided in his friend, as has been demonstrated by Quaatz's diaries, published in 1989.

Despite his mother being Jewish, Quaatz endorsed antisemitic policies as a DNVP politician and even encouraged Hugenburg to work closely with Adolf Hitler for fear of both socialism and the political Catholicism of the Centre Party.

Away from politics, he was an industrialist and financier and in early 1933, he was appointed to the board of the Dresdner Bank. He was removed from that position in February 1936, as the Nazi laws barred the Mischling from such positions.

He was briefly crossexamined by the Gestapo in the aftermath of the 20 July plot on Hitler's life in 1944, but generally, his high-level contacts meant that he endured little state attention.

He was a founder member of the Christian Democratic Union in Berlin after the war.
