= Oskar Hergt =

German politician (1869–1967)

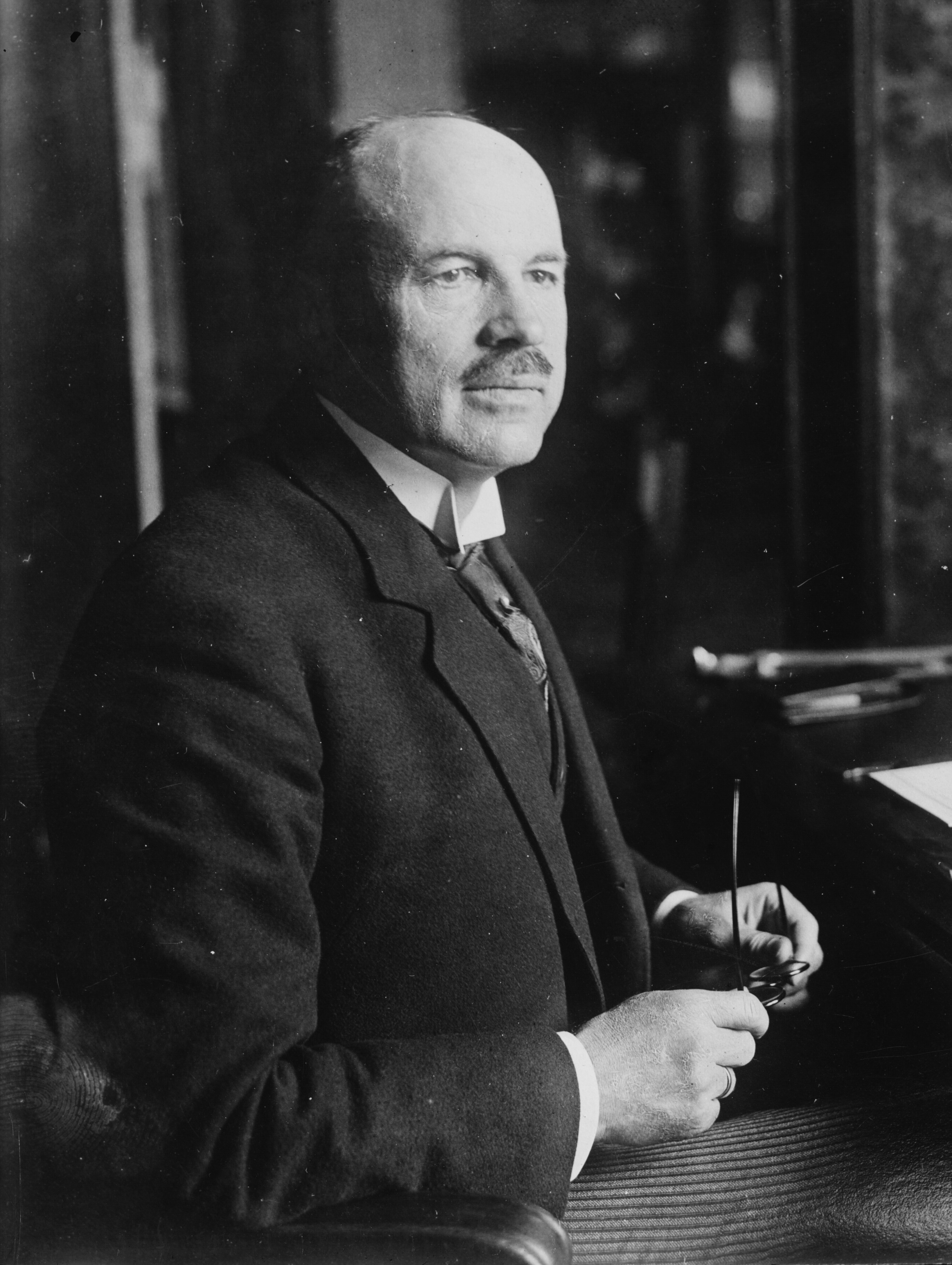
- Hergt in 1924

Vice-Chancellor of Germany
- In office 28 January 1927 – 28 June 1928
- Chancellor: Wilhelm Marx
- Preceded by: Karl Jarres (1924)
- Succeeded by: Hermann Dietrich (1930)

Reich Minister of Justice
- In office 28 January 1927 – 28 June 1928
- Chancellor: Wilhelm Marx
- Preceded by: Johannes Bell
- Succeeded by: Erich Koch-Weser

Chairman of the German National People's Party
- In office 19 December 1918 – 23 October 1924
- Preceded by: Office established
- Succeeded by: Johann Friedrich Winckler

Member of the Reichstag
- In office 24 June 1920 – 14 July 1933
- Constituency: Hesse-Nassau (1932–1933); Liegnitz (1920–1932)

Personal details
- Born: 22 October 1869 Naumburg, Province of Saxony, Kingdom of Prussia
- Died: 9 May 1967 (aged 97) Göttingen, Lower Saxony, West Germany
- Party: DNVP (1918–1933)
- Other political affiliations: Independent (affiliated with the FKP) (1902–1918)
- Occupation: Lawyer

Oskar Gustav Rudolf Hergt (22 October 1869 in Naumburg – 9 May 1967 in Göttingen) was a German lawyer and nationalist politician, who served simultaneously as the minister of Justice and vice-chancellor from 28 January 1927 to 12 June 1928. Hergt attended the prestigious Domgymnasium Naumburg before studying law at the University of Würzburg, the Ludwig-Maximilians-Universität München, and the Friedrich Wilhelm University of Berlin. He worked as a Gerichtsassessor in Saxony, and as a judge in Liebenwerda. Hergt held various senior offices at the Prussian Ministry of Finance from 1904 to 1914.

Previously a member of the Free Conservative Party (FKP), which was dissolved after the First World War, Hergt was a founding member of the right-wing monarchist German National People's Party (DNVP) and the party's first chairman from 1918 to 1924 and leader of its parliamentary group from 1920 to 1924. First elected to the Reichstag in 1920, he was seen as one of the more moderate members of the party. His support for the Dawes Plan in 1924 was seen as a betrayal of the party's line and led to his replacement with the more hardline conservative Kuno von Westarp.

As vice-chancellor in the Fourth Marx cabinet, Hergt was the most senior DNVP politician in Wilhelm Marx's coalition government, but after losing the DNVP's leadership election in October 1928 to Alfred Hugenberg, he became an increasingly minor figure in the radicalised DNVP. After the rise of the Nazi Party, Hergt retired from politics.
