= German National People's Party =

Political party in Germany (1918–1933)

German National People's Party Deutschnationale Volkspartei
- Other name: Württemberg Citizens' Party (Note: (Party name in Württemberg)); Deutsche Nationale Front (Note: (from 5 May – 27 June 1933))
- Abbreviation: DNVP
- Founded: December 1918; 107 years ago
- Dissolved: 27 June 1933; 93 years ago
- Merger of: Several parties: DkP; FKP (Note: The far-right wing of the Free Conservative Party and the National Liberals joined the German National People's Party.); DVLP; DvP; CSP; NLP
- Succeeded by: None (Note: While there were no official successors to the DNVP, several parties were created by former DNVP members sympathetic to monarchist and national-conservative positions. Examples include the German Right Party (Deutsche Rechtspartei), the regionalist German Party, and a short-lived DNVP formed in 1962. This DNVP would merge with the Deutsche Reichspartei, a successor of the former two, in 1964 to form the National Democratic Party of Germany.)
- Student wing: German National Student Union (DNSt)
- Youth wing: Bismarckjugend
- Paramilitary wing: Kampfstaffeln (from 1931)
- Media group: Hugenberg Group
- Membership: approx. 950,000 (1923 est.)
- Ideology: Authoritarian conservatism; National conservatism; Monarchism (German); Völkisch nationalism; Corporate statism; Proto-fascism
- Political position: Right-wing to far-right (Note: In the 1920s, when it took part to centre-right coalition governments, the DNVP was considered a mainstream right-wing party. By the 1930s, the party returned to many of its more reactionary views of its early years and moved rightward, and is thus also classified as far-right.)
- Religion: Protestantism
- Political alliance: Young Plan referendum; Harzburg Front (1931)
- Electoral alliance: Kampffront Schwarz-Weiß-Rot
- Colours: Black White Red; Blue (customary)

Party flag

The German National People's Party (German: Deutschnationale Volkspartei, DNVP) was a national-conservative and monarchist political party in Germany during the Weimar Republic. Before the rise of the Nazi Party, it was the major nationalist party in Weimar Germany. It was an alliance of conservative, nationalist, monarchist, völkisch, and antisemitic elements supported by the Pan-German League. Ideologically, the party was described as subscribing to authoritarian conservatism, German nationalism, and monarchism. Until 1931, the party also advocated for national liberal and protectionist economic policies, embracing corporatist economic policies from 1931 onwards. Some members like the populist media mogul Alfred Hugenberg embraced economic nationalism and statism. It held anti-communist, anti-Catholic, and antisemitic views. On the left–right political spectrum, it belonged on the right wing. Specifically, it is classified as far-right in its early years and then again in the late 1920s when it moved back rightward. It has also been described as proto-fascist.

It was formed in late 1918 after Germany's defeat in World War I and the German Revolution of 1918–1919 that toppled the German Empire and the monarchy. It combined the bulk of the German Conservative Party, Free Conservative Party, and German Fatherland Party, with right-wing elements of the National Liberal Party. The party strongly rejected the republican Weimar Constitution of 1919 and the Treaty of Versailles, which it viewed as a national disgrace, signed by traitors. The party instead aimed at a restoration of monarchy, a repeal of the dictated peace treaty and reacquisition of all lost territories and colonies.

During the mid-1920s, the DNVP maintained a more moderate profile, accepting republican institutions in practice while still calling for a return to monarchy in its manifesto, and participating in centre-right coalition governments on federal and state levels. It broadened its voting base—winning as much as 20.5% in the December 1924 German federal election—and supported the election of Paul von Hindenburg as President of Germany (Reichspräsident) in 1925. Under the leadership of Alfred Hugenberg in 1928, the party moved to the far-right and reclaimed its reactionary nationalist and anti-republican rhetoric and changed its strategy to mass mobilization, plebiscites, and support of authoritarian rule by the president instead of working through parliamentary means. At the same time, it lost many votes to Adolf Hitler's rising Nazi Party. Several prominent Nazis began their careers in the DNVP.

After 1929, the DNVP co-operated with the Nazis, joining forces in the Harzburg Front of 1931, forming coalition governments in some states and finally supporting Hitler's appointment as Chancellor of Germany (Reichskanzler) in January 1933. Initially, the DNVP had a number of ministers in Hitler's government, but the party quickly lost influence and eventually dissolved itself in June 1933, giving way to the Nazis' single-party dictatorship with the majority of its former members joining the Nazi Party. The Nazis allowed the remaining former DNVP members in the Reichstag, the civil service, and the police to continue with their jobs and left the rest of the party membership generally in peace. During the Second World War, several prominent former DNVP members, such as Carl Friedrich Goerdeler, were involved in the German resistance to Nazism and took part in the 20 July plot to assassinate Hitler in 1944.

== History ==
=== National Opposition, 1918–1924 ===
The party was formed in December 1918 by a merger of the German Conservative Party and the Free Conservative Party of the old monarchic German Empire. It was joined soon afterward by the most right-wing section of the former National Liberal Party, and most supporters of the dissolved radically nationalist German Fatherland Party, the antisemitic Christian Social Party and German Völkisch Party. Thus, the party united most of the formerly fragmented conservative spectrum of the Empire. The process that led to the DNVP began on 22 November 1918 when an ad appeared in a number of Berlin newspapers calling for a new right-wing party for "which we suggest the name of German National People's Party". The founding of the DNVP was a response to the November Revolution of 1918 and the sense of extreme crisis it had engendered amongst the German right, where there were widespread fears that society was on the verge of destruction. As a result of the crisis atmosphere of late 1918, a very wide assortment of different parties came together to form the DNVP. This proved to be as much weakness as a strength as the DNVP had strong fissiparous tendencies throughout its existence, which was the product of the various different streams of conservatism that found themselves flowing uneasily together in one party. There was much disagreement about who was to lead the new party, and Oskar Hergt was chosen as leader on 19 December 1918 very much as the compromise candidate, being a little-known civil servant who was thereforth acceptable to all the factions. British historian Ian Kershaw wrote that ever since the late 19th century there had been tension on the German right between traditional conservatives and the more radical populist völkisch elements, saying: "Even the German National People's Party, itself with many fascistic characteristics, could only uneasily accommodate the new strength of the populist forces on the radical Right".

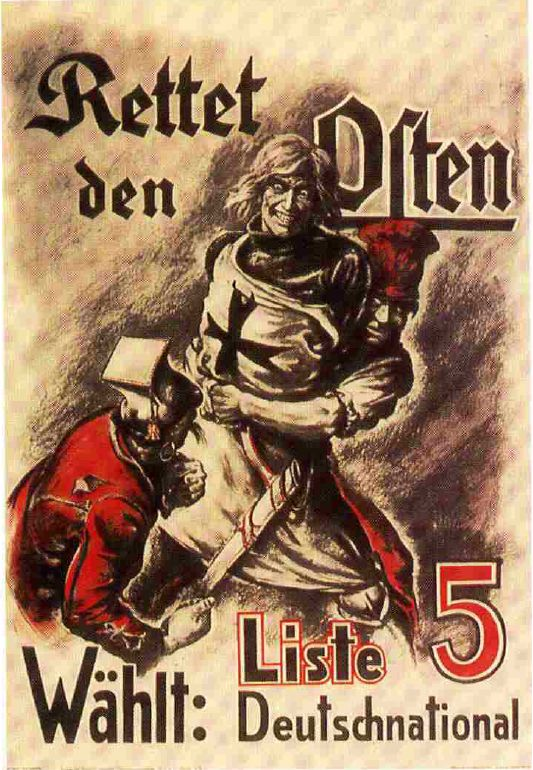
A DNVP poster from 1920 showing a Teutonic knight being attacked by Poles and socialists as the caption reads "Save the East"

At the founding convention in December 1918, Siegfried von Kardorff gave the keynote speech, in which he stated "Our new party, in which friendly right-wing parties have united, has no past and rejects any responsibility for the past. We have a present, and God willing, a good future", to which the delegates shouted "But without the Jews!" The task of writing out a common platform acceptable to all fell to a committee headed by Ulrich von Hassell. Reflecting a strong antisemitic orientation, right from the start Jews were banned from joining the DNVP. In the elections on 19 January 1919 for the National Assembly that was to write the new constitution, the DNVP produced a pamphlet entitled "The Jews—Germany's vampires!"

Generally hostile towards the republican Weimar constitution, the DNVP spent most of the inter-war period in opposition. Of the 19 cabinets between 1919 and 1932, the DNVP took part in only two governments and their total period in office over this 13-year period was 27 months. The party was largely supported by landowners, especially from the agricultural, conservative and Protestant Prussian east (East Elbia), and wealthy industrialists, moreover by monarchist academics, pastors, high-ranking government officials, farmers, craftsmen, small traders, nationalist white-collar and blue-collar workers. Because most of the Protestant aristocracy, high civil servants, the Lutheran clergy, the Bildungsbürgertum (the upper middle class), university professors, and Gymnasium (high schools for these destined to go to university) teachers supported the DNVP until 1930, the party had a cultural influence on German life far beyond what its share of the vote would suggest. Because so many university professors and Gymnasium teachers supported the DNVP, everyone who went to university in Germany under the Weimar republic was exposed in some way to Deutsch-National influence. More women than men voted for the DNVP, and despite the party's traditionalist values, women were very active in the DNVP. The women in the DNVP came mostly from the evangelical Protestant church leagues, associations representing housewives who had become politically active during World War I and women who been active in groups like the Pan-German League, the Colonial League and the Navy League. The women in the DNVP tended to be most concerned with wiping out "trash and dirt" which was their term for pornography and prostitution, and was seen as especially threatening to women. The Israeli historian Yehuda Bauer called the DNVP "the party of the traditional, often radical anti-Semitic elites." The writer Kurt Tucholsky wrote in 1924 that "Even in Jewish circles (of which a portion would still vote German-National today, were the party not so stupid to trade in anti-Semitism) and even in merchant circles, this way of thinking prevails." Extremely nationalistic and reactionary and originally favouring restoration of the Hohenzollern monarchy, it later supported the creation of an authoritarian state as a substitute. Its supporters came from dedicated nationalists, the aristocracy, parts of the middle class and big business. The DNVP had little appeal to Catholics and almost its entire support came from Protestant areas.

The Lutheran character of the party was stressed early on, with DNVP making direct appeals to Lutheran voters. Party campaigners also made anti-Catholic appeals—a DNVP political leaftlet in Berlin read: "No Romish intrigues are going to rob us of our heritage of the Reformation. Protestant spirit must remain strong in our Fatherland." The Anti-Catholic character of the DNVP is traced back to the tradition of Kulturkampf, under which Otto von Bismarck "associated the meaning of being German with Protestantism". Catholicism was portrayed as un-German and associated with foreign and "papist" influence. As such, DNVP focused solely on Protestant voters while marginalising and attacking Roman Catholics—Richard Steigmann-Gall remarks that in Weimar Germany, "the narrative of national identity in Germany was written in a distinctly Protestant language". The DNVP opposed establishing relations with the Vatican and rejected the Prussian Concordat of 1929, arguing that Germany should not make formal agreements with the Catholic Church. The party refused to court Catholic voters, and Alfred Hugenberg rejected ideas to establish local Catholic committees of the DNVP, even when advised that this may damage the electoral appeal of the party. According to historian Larry Eugene Jones, the DNVP expressed "deeply ingrained anti-Catholic sentiments", and party officials went as far as proclaiming that DNVP was "bound to Protestant structures" and "did not stand for Catholic interests." German Catholics overwhelmingly refused to participate in the 1929 German referendum, displaying their disapproval of Hugenberg and his party. The Catholic clergy was critical of the German Right and was hostile towards the DNVP; the party was openly denounced and attacked by members of the Catholic clergy, such as the Archbishop of Breslau Adolf Bertram or Bishop of Trier Franz Rudolf Bornewasser. German Catholics were also prohibited from joining right-wing paramilitary organizations such as the Young German Order and DNVP-affiliated Stahlhelm, and Catholic bishops barred Catholics and clergymen from sitting in the DNVP parliamentary delegations.

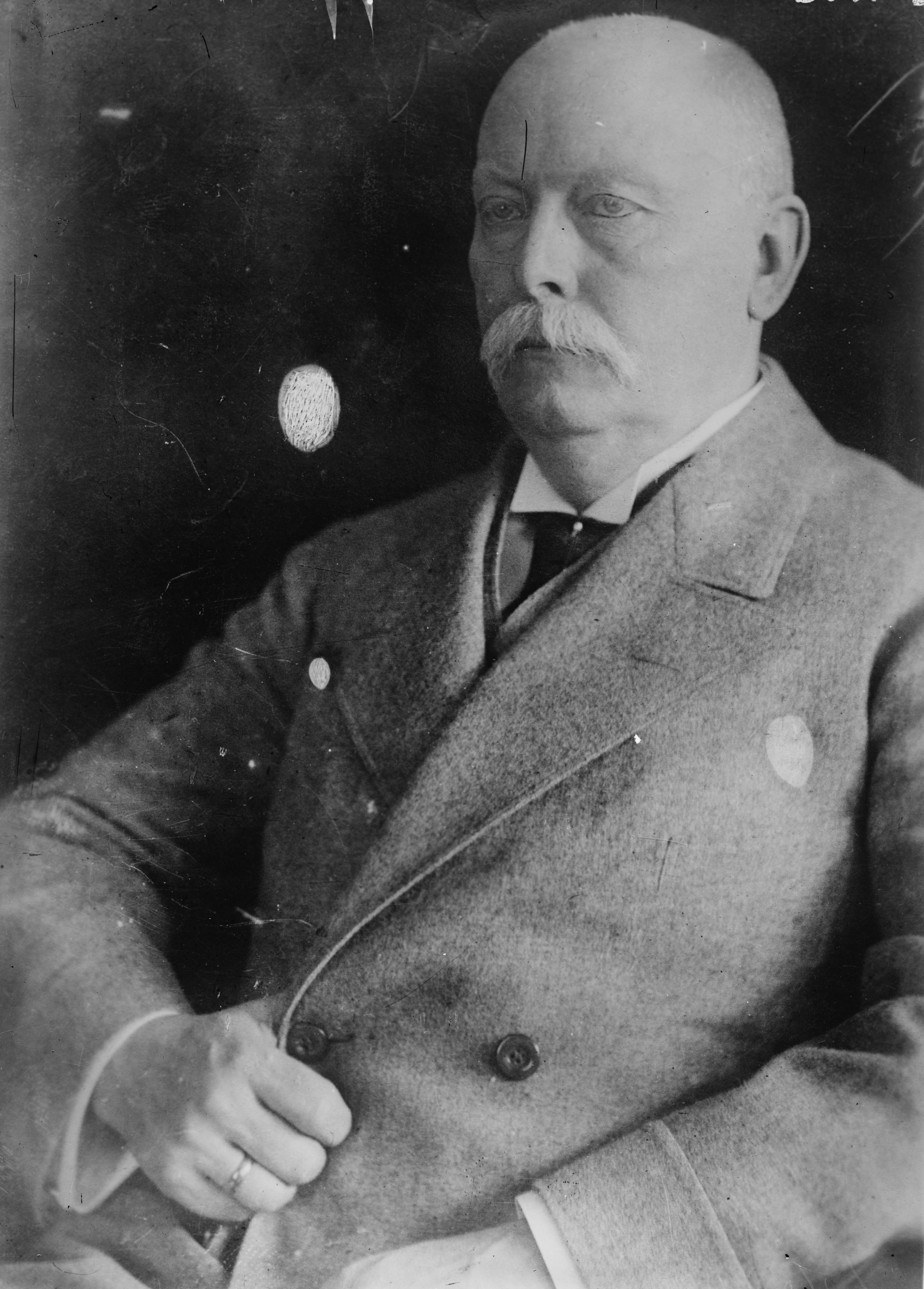
Clemens von Delbrück served as the DNVP's chief spokesman during the National Assembly that wrote the constitution of 1919.

When the National Assembly convened to write the new constitution for Germany on 6 February 1919, the DNVP's chief contribution to the debates was a lengthy defence of the former Emperor Wilhelm II by Clemens von Delbrück, and a series of long speeches by other DNVP deputies defending Germany's actions in the July Crisis of 1914, the ideology of Pan-Germanism and the decision to adopt unrestricted submarine warfare in 1917. None of these had anything to do with the task at hand, namely to write a new constitution. The DNVP made no contribution to the drafting of the new constitution. In June 1919, the Reichstag had to ratify the Treaty of Versailles in the face of a warning from the Allies that World War I would resume if it was not ratified. The DNVP made certain that the other parties in the Reichstag were going to vote for the treaty, and then voted against it. The DNVP was secure in the knowledge that its vote would not cause the resumption of the war while the odium of Versailles would be borne by the other parties. Afterwards, the DNVP started a racist campaign against the presence of Senegalese and Vietnamese troops serving in the French army of occupation in the Rhineland (the so-called "Black Horror on the Rhine"), claiming that African and Asian men were genetically programmed to rape white women with DNVP politician Käthe Schirmacher stating in a speech: "The lust of white, yellow and black Frenchmen for German women leads to daily violence!" Schirmacher wrote in her diary in 1919 that: "The only thing uniting us with Poland is our common hatred of Juda".

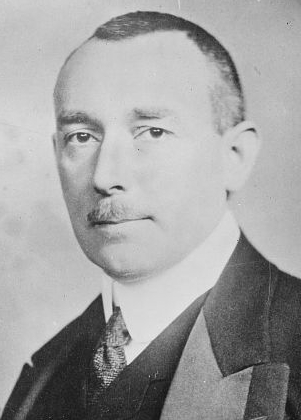
Karl Helfferich, leader of the DNVP's Reichstag delegation 1919–1924, was well known for his abusive and abrasive style of politics which led to Chancellor Joseph Wirth to accuse him in 1922 on the floor of the Reichstag of moral responsibility for the assassination of Walther Rathenau.

It favoured a monarchist platform and was strongly opposed to the Weimar Republic in domestic affairs and Treaty of Versailles in foreign affairs. Typical of the party's views about Weimar was a 1919 pamphlet by Karl Helfferich entitled "Erzberger Must Go!", which was in equal terms violently anti-democratic, anti-Catholic and anti-Semitic. The target of the pamphlet was Matthias Erzberger of the Zentrum, whom Hellferich called "the puppet of the Jews", and called openly for his assassination to avenge his "crimes" such as signing the armistice ending World War I. Helfferich wrote that Erzberger's career was "a sordid mixing of political activity with his own pecuniary advantage... at the crucial moment of the war, acting for his Habsburg-Bourbon patrons, he cowardly attacked German policy from the rear with his July action, and thereby destroyed in the German people the belief in and therefore the will to victory" [By "July action" Helfereich was referring to the Reichstag Peace Resolution of July 1917, which Erzberger played a major role in writing]. Helfferich especially hated Erzberger for making a speech in July 1919 that blamed him for the bad shape of German budget, with Erzberger noting during the war Helfferich had decided not to raise taxes, and instead ran up colossal debts which he planned to pay off by imposing reparations on the Allies once Germany won the war. Erzberger sued Helfferich for libel over his statement that Erzberger was "dishonestly combining political activity with his own financial interests". Amid much media attention the libel trial ended on 12 March 1920 with the judge ruling that some of Helfferich's statements were true while fining Helfferich a nominal sum for technical libel for the statements that he declared that Helfferich lacked sufficient evidence to back up with. The German historian Eberhard Kolb wrote none of Helfferich's claims were true, and that the outcome of the libel case was due to a conservative judge who disliked democracy. The judge's bias could be seen in that the judge went out of his way in his ruling to praise Helfferich for his "patriotic motives" in attacking Erzberger.

In the run-up to the Kapp Putsch of March 1920, the DNVP leaders were informed by Wolfgang Kapp in February 1920 that a putsch to overthrow the government would soon occur, and asked for their support. Kapp received an equivocal answer, but the party's leaders did not inform the government a putsch was being planned. During the Kapp Putsch of March 1920, the DNVP took an ambiguous stance, reflecting a strong sympathy for the aims of the putsch without coming entirely in support out of the fear that the putsch might fail. One of the DNVP leaders, Gottfried Traub served as "Minister of Church and Cultural Affairs" in Kapp's provisional government while Paul Bang of the Pan-German League was going to serve in the provisional government, though he backed out later on 13 March 1920 on the grounds that the putsch was "hopeless". Within the party's leadership, Count Kuno von Westarp was in favour of supporting the putsch while Oskar Hergt was opposed. After the putsch failed, the DNVP issued a statement that condemned the government far more harshly for resorting to the "lawless" method of a general strike to defeat the putsch than it did the putsch itself, which was portrayed as an understandable, if extreme response to the existence of the republic.

The outcome of the Erzberger-Helfferich libel trial encouraged the DNVP to engage in a campaign of vituperative and vitriolic attacks on leaders of the Weimar Coalition who supported the republic, usually accompanied with calls for the assassination of the "traitors", which was to be DNVP's main contribution to politics for next several years. The DNVP was well known for outrageous, often childish antics such as mailing a dead dog to the French Ambassador to protest against paying reparations to France and for launching a campaign of mailing parcels containing human excrement to Social Democratic leaders. The campaign against the "Black Horror on the Rhine" occupied much of the DNVP's time in the early 1920s. Kolb wrote that the DNVP played a major role in the "brutalization of politics" in the Weimar Republic with its relentless denigration of its enemies as "traitors" together with its insistence that murder was a perfectly acceptable procedure for dealing with one's political opponents, who the DNVP claimed did not deserve to live.

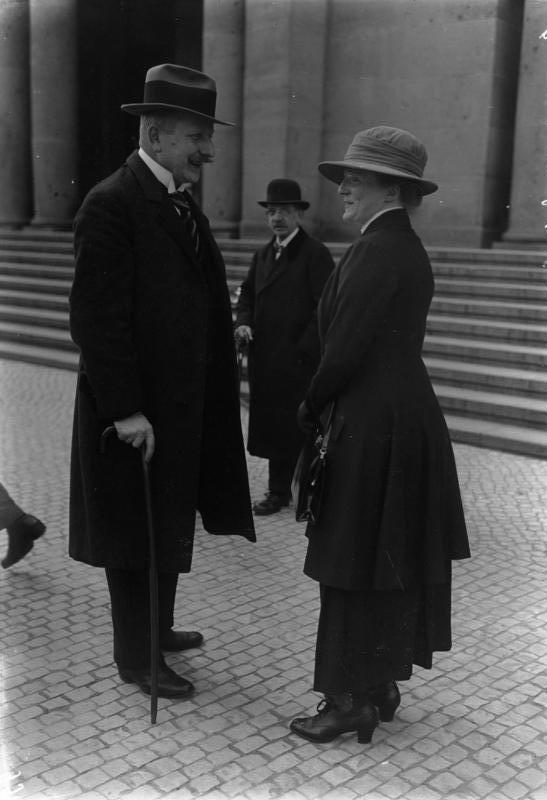
Reinhold Wulle (left) was one of the leaders of the DNVP's völkisch wing in the early 1920s who walked out of the party in 1922.

The climax of the campaign against the leaders of the Weimar Coalition occurred in February 1922 when Walther Rathenau became Foreign Minister, which led the DNVP to launch an especially vicious antisemitic campaign against Rathenau claiming that "German honour" had been sullied by the appointment of "the international Jew" Rathenau as Foreign Minister, which could only be avenged with Rathenau's assassination. In an article by Wilhelm Henning, it was claimed Rathenau was somehow involved with the assassination of Count Wilhelm von Mirbach, the German ambassador to the Soviet Union in 1918, and that the fact that Rathenau did not mention Mirbach's assassination during his visit to the Soviet Union in April 1922 being presented as proof that Rathenau had a hand in Mirbach's death. When Rathenau was assassinated on 24 June 1922, the Zentrum Chancellor Joseph Wirth angrily turned towards the DNVP's Reichstag delegation and with his finger pointing clearly at Helfferich, shouted "The enemy is on the right! Here are those who drip poison into the wounds of the German people!". Wirth, who was shaken by the murder of his friend Rathenau, pushed through the Reichstag the Law for the Protection of the Republic on 21 July 1922. It increased the penalties for conspiring to political assassination and allowed the government to ban organizations that attempted to undermine the constitutionally established republican form of government. Only the DNVP, the Communists and the Bavarian People's Party (BVP) voted against the law, with every other party voting for it. Wirth would have liked to use the new law to ban the DNVP, but was unable to do so because no links could be established between the DNVP and the Organisation Consul terrorist group. Faced with a possible ban for encouraging terrorism after the Rathenau assassination and a public backlash over its initially jubilant reaction to Rathenau's murder, the party started to crack down on its extreme völkisch wing, who had been the most vociferous in calling for Rathenau's blood. To stop a total break with its völkisch wing, in September 1922 a "völkisch study group" under Wilhelm Kube was set up. Despite Kube's best efforts to work out a compromise, the leading völkisch activists' Wilhelm Henning, Reinhold Wulle and Albrecht von Graefe all resigned from the party in October 1922 when the party's leader Oskar Hergt supported by Otto Hoetzsch and Count Kuno von Westarp made it clear that they wanted no more calls for assassinations, which had caused a major public relations problem. Henning, Wulle and Graefe founded the German Völkisch Freedom Party in December 1922.

In September 1923, the DVP Chancellor Gustav Stresemann announced the end of "passive resistance" to the occupation of the Ruhr (Ruhrkampf) under the grounds that hyperinflation had destroyed the economy and the Ruhrkampf must end in order to save Germany. As a result, the DNVP found itself joining forces with the Communist Party of Germany (KPD) in denouncing the end of the Ruhrkampf as treason and as a cowardly surrender to "a half-sated irreconcilable France". The DNVP announced that if they were in charge that they would continue the Ruhrkampf regardless of the economic costs and misery.

=== Dawes Plan vote: a change in direction ===
At a party conference in early April 1924, the DNVP had come out clearly against the proposed restructuring of Germany's reparations payments known as the Dawes Plan, which the DNVP denounced as the "second Versailles". Part of the restructuring was an 800 million Reichsmark loan provided primarily by a consortium of Wall Street banks led by the House of Morgan that would help stabilize the currency after the hyper-inflation of 1923 that had all but destroyed the economy. Helfferich, the DNVP's leading economic expert, had published two detailed critiques in Die Kreuzzeitung that purported to prove that the Dawes Plan existed only to "enslave" Germany by allowing the Allies to take control of and exploit the German economy forever. The spring 1924 campaign was largely led and organized by charismatic, media savvy Admiral Alfred von Tirpitz who was presented as the "savior" type figure, able to rally together the entire nation to both win the election and then restore Germany back as a great power. The ineffectual Hergt had chosen to stay on the sidelines in order to improve his party's chances. Unusually for a DNVP politician, Tirpitz based his campaign in Munich as part of an effort to win Catholic support. In the Reichstag election of 4 May 1924, the DNVP posted its best showing yet, winning 19% of the vote.

A major problem for the DNVP throughout its entire existence was the tension caused between its tendency towards a policy of total opposition to the Weimar Republic and pressure from many of its supporters for the DNVP to participate in the government. Since the DNVP was unlikely to win the majority of the seats in the Reichstag on account of the proportional representation system, as a party committed to total opposition to the republic it doomed itself to being an opposition party forever. Many of the DNVP's supporters made it clear by 1924 that they were unhappy about supporting a party whose role was purely negative in opposing everything that the government did while refusing to take part in any of the coalition governments. The British historian Sir John Wheeler-Bennett wrote "At no time during the Weimar Republic did they make a single constructive contribution to the government of the country". At the same time, there was another equally influential fraction within the DNVP who took it for granted that it was only a matter of time before the republic disintegrated, and that the best thing to do was to maintain the current course of total opposition to the republic, secure in knowing that all of the blame for the current problems would rest with the parties of the Weimar coalition who were willing to assume the burdens of office.

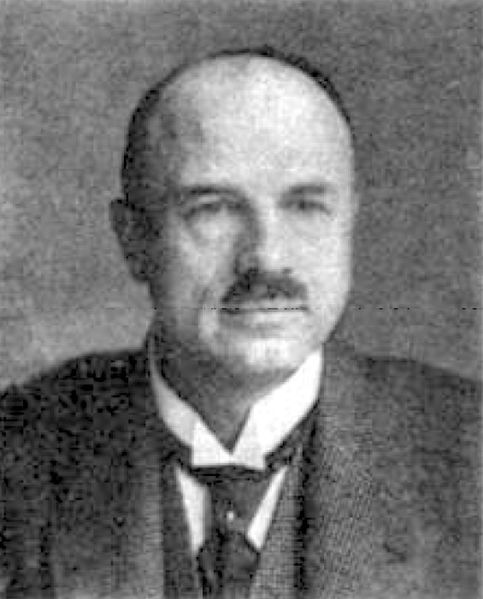
Oskar Hergt, the DNVP's first leader from 1918 to 1924 whose Dawes Plan vote of 1924 proved to be the end of his leadership

In the summer of 1924, these tensions came out in the open with a vigorous display of party in-fighting over the question of whether the DNVP's MdRs (German MdR: Mitglied des Reichstags—Member of the Reichstag) should vote for the Dawes Plan or not. Initially, the DNVP had promised to vote against the Dawes Plan when it came up for ratification in the Reichstag on the grounds that Germany should not have to pay any reparations at all, resulting in many of the economic lobbying groups that donated to the party such as the Landbund, the Reich Association of German Industry (RDI) and the Chamber of Industry and Commerce threatening to cease donating to the party forever if its MdRs voted against the Dawes Plan. The Dawes Plan was a crucial element in the international attempt to stabilise the German economy after hyper-inflation had destroyed the German economy in 1923, and the economic lobbying groups that supported the DNVP were appalled at the party's intention to reject the Dawes Plan, and thereby risk a return to the economic chaos of 1923. As the parties of the Weimar coalition did not have a two-thirds majority in the Reichstag, it was clear that the DNVP would have to vote for the Dawes Plan to have it ratified. The American banks had demanded as one of the conditions of the loan that the Reich government put up the state-owned Deutsche Reichsbahn railroad as collateral, but the 1919 constitution stated the Reichsbahn could not be used as collateral. Thus to receive the Dawes Plan loan required the Reich government to amend the constitution to put up the Reichsbahn as collateral, which required a two-thirds majority in the Reichstag.

At first, the DNVP tried to avoid an internal split caused by the up-coming Dawes Plan vote by insisting upon several conditions in exchange for voting for the Dawes Plan such as the appointment of Admiral Alfred von Tirpitz as Chancellor, firing Stresemann as the foreign minister and the removal of Otto Braun as Prussian minister-president together with the rest of the Social Democrats from the Prussian government. The British historian Edgar Feuchtwanger commented that the demand that the Anglophobic Admiral von Tirpitz be appointed Chancellor at a time when the British government was applying heavy pressure on France to reduce reparations on Germany showed that DNVP had a stunning "lack of realism". The Chancellor Wilhelm Marx rejected all of the DNVP conditions and informed the party that they either vote for or against the Dawes Plan, thereby settling off a bitter factional battle within the DNVP. In addition, Stresemann—who had privately bristled at Admiral Tirpitz's charges that he was conducting a foreign policy of Ohnmachtspolitik (policy of powerlessness) before the Allies—asked the German embassies in London, Paris, and Washington to inquire of their respective host governments what would be their reaction to Tirpitz becoming Chancellor. The very negative international response that the prospect of Tirpitz as the Chancellor generated was then leaked by Stresemann to various Reichstag deputies as a way of showing how absurd the DNVP was in demanding that Tirpitz being appointed Chancellor, and how isolated Germany would be with Tirpitz as the leader. In an editorial, the New York World wrote "To any German who wishes his country to enjoy the benefit of an international loan, it must be sufficiently obvious that the mere mention of the bearded hero of the submarine offensive is madness pure and simple" while The Daily Telegraph of London wrote in a leader (editorial) that the prospect of Tirpitz becoming Chancellor was "a masterpiece of folly". The French government issued a statement saying Tirpitz as Chancellor would be the end of any effort to improve Franco-German relations while the American and Belgian ambassadors both issued warnings to the German government that Tirpitz as Chancellor would be a source of tension in their relations with Germany. The British Ambassador Lord D'Abernon warned that "If the Germans want to find a closed front hostile to them they cannot do anything better but to make Tirpitz Chancellor of the Reich". The clash between Stresemann and Tirpitz over the Dawes Plan marked the beginning of a long feud that was to continue until Stresemann's death in 1929. Right from the moment that Admiral Tirpitz was elected to the Reichstag in May 1924, he emerged as Stresemann's most "tenacious adversary" in the Reichstag and presented himself as the unabashed champion of German power politics, a man unafraid, indeed proud to state his belief that Germany should be the world's greatest power.

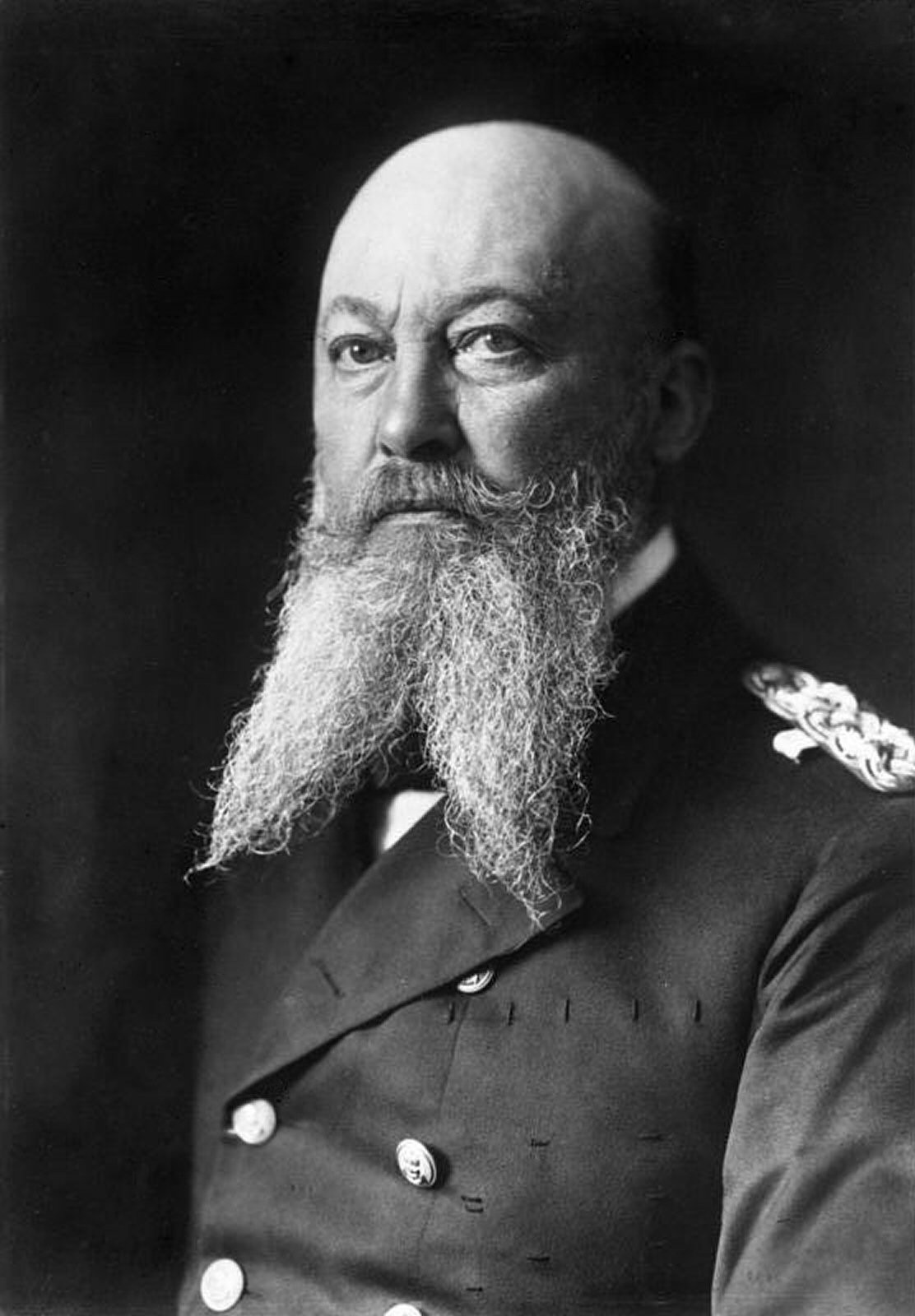
In 1924, the DNVP made a major push to have Admiral Alfred von Tirpitz as Chancellor, sparking widespread international condemnation.

Finally, President Friedrich Ebert applied more pressure by warning the DNVP that if the Dawes Plan were rejected, he would dissolve the Reichstag for early elections, and the party would then face the wrath of angry voters. After much internal fighting between the pro- and anti-Dawes Plan factions, in order to prevent the party from splitting in two, it was announced that the vote on the Dawes Plan would be a free vote with no party discipline and accordingly DNVP MdRs would vote on the Dawes Plan as they saw fit. The vote on the Dawes Plan on 29 August 1924 was described as "one of the most dramatically moving votes ever experienced by the German Reichstag, since the final result remained uncertain until the very last minute". About half of the DNVP MdRs voted for the Dawes Plan while the other half voted against. The final vote was 49 DNVP MdRs for acceptance vs. 48 MdRs against. The support of the pro-Dawes Plan DNVP MdRs was just enough to get the Dawes Plan ratified by the Reichstag. The passage of the Dawes Plan produced much turmoil in the Reichstag with considerable cheering and jeering. One of the anti-Dawes Plan DNVP deputies, Alfred Hugenberg was so enraged by the passage of the Dawes Plan that he screamed on the floor of the Reichstag that those DNVP MdRs who voted for the Dawes Plan should be expelled from the party. The National Socialist MP General Erich Ludendorff shouted at the pro-Dawes Plan DNVP MdRs that "This is a shame for Germany! Ten years ago I won the battle of Tannenberg. Today you have made a Tannenberg victory possible for the Jews!".

The Dawes Plan vote brought to the surface the conflict between the party's pragmatic wing most closely associated with industrial interests and farmers from the western part of Germany who were prepared to work inside the system within certain limits if only to safeguard their own interests versus those who were mostly closely associated with the rural areas of East Elbia, especially the Junkers (landed nobility) and the Pan-German League who wanted to destroy democracy with no thought to the consequences. The in-fighting over the Dawes Plan together with the related bad feelings within the DNVP's Reichstag delegation led to Oskar Hergt being ousted later in 1924 as the party's leader and his replacement with the interim leader of Johann Friedrich Winckler who in turn was replaced by Count Kuno von Westarp. In the bitter aftermath of the Dawes Plan vote, the influential Land associations of Pomerania, East Prussia and Schleswig-Holstein all passed resolutions attacking Hergt for his "betrayal" of the party's principles by allowing a free vote on the "second Versailles" of the Dawes Plan, instead of imposing party discipline to force the entire caucus to vote against the bail-out. A month later in September 1924 the general Land association passed a resolution calling on Hergt to resign within a month if he could not form a government; as he failed to do this forced him to resign in October 1924.

=== Mid-1920s: a tack towards the centre ===
In the December 1924 federal election, constituencies with a DNVP plurality coloured in light blue show the party had its strongholds in the northeastern provinces, especially Pomerania.

Initially, the change of leadership made little difference. In its platform for the Reichstag election of 7 December 1924, the party declared the following:

″Our party remains as it was: monarchist and völkisch, Christian and social. Our goals remain the same as our name: German and national. Our colours remain black, white and red: our resolution is firmer than ever: to create a Germany free of Jewish control and French domination, free from parliamentary intrigue and the populist rule of big capital".

Those parties that had voted against the Dawes Plan lost seats while that had voted for the Dawes Plan gained seats, which as half the DNVP caucus had voted for the Plan while the other half had voted against meant the DNVP made only very modest gains in the second 1924 election. The outcome of the second 1924 election together with the appointment of the nonpartisan Hans Luther as Chancellor in early 1925 allowed Count von Westarp to persuade the DNVP to join Luther's government. While it sought the ultimate demise of Weimar Republic, it participated in its politics and ruling government for a time in the mid-1920s to keep Social Democrats out of power. Before its alliance with Nazis, the party sought support of the national liberal German People's Party.

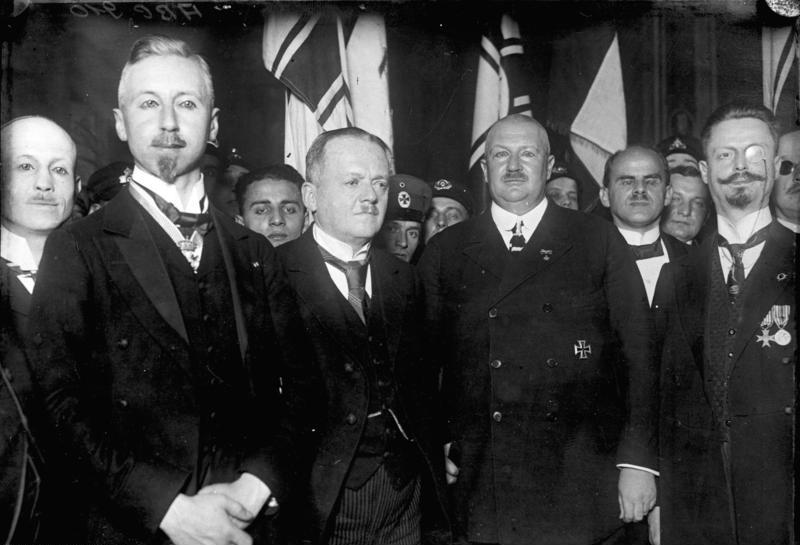
Kuno von Westarp (second from the left) together with Hohenzollern princes at the DNVP convention, 1924

Between 1925 and 1928, the party slightly moderated its tone and actively cooperated in successive governments. In the presidential election of 1925, the DNVP supported Karl Jarres for president, who was defeated in the first round by Zentrum's Wilhelm Marx, who however failed to gain a majority. Fearing that Marx would win the second round (something made the more likely by the fact that the SPD's Otto Braun had dropped out to endorse Marx), Admiral Tirpitz made a dramatic visit to the home of the retired Field Marshal Paul von Hindenburg to ask him to run for the second round in order to "save" Germany by gaining the presidency for the right. Tirpitz persuaded Hindenburg to run, and though Hindenburg won the election as a non-party candidate, the DNVP strongly supported the Field Marshal. General Otto von Feldmann of the DNVP worked very closely with Hindenburg during the 1925 election as Hindenburg's "political agent". Despite the move to the center at the level of high politics, at the grass-roots of the party the opposite direction prevailed. Starting in 1924, the DNVP's newsletter for women (which was written entirely by female volunteers) started to vehemently insist that German women only marry a "Nordic man" and raise their children to be racists. From the mid-1920s onwards, the women party activists started to draft plans calling for the end of all "Jewish cultural influence" in Germany, banning Jews from working as teachers and writers, making eugenics into state policy with a new class of bureaucrats to be called "racial guardians" to be created in order to assess a couple's "racial worth" before allowing them to marry or not, and breaking German citizenship into two grades of those allowed to marry and those who would not.

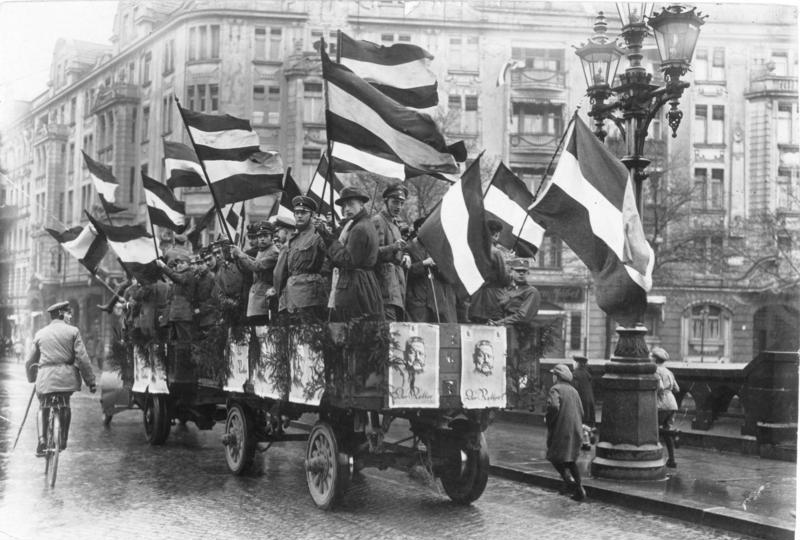
The DNVP campaigns for Paul von Hindenburg in the 1925 election

In 1926, under its leader Count von Westarp the DNVP took office by joining the coalition government led by Chancellor Wilhelm Marx with the stated aim of pulling German politics towards the right. After the "betrayal" of the Dawes Plan vote, the fraction of the DNVP mostly closely associated with the Pan-German League had started a major effort to take over the party's grass-roots to prevent another "betrayal", a slow, but steady process that would ultimately prove the undoing of Count von Westarp. During its time in the government, the DNVP made a major push for higher tariffs on agricultural products from abroad, which pleased the party's powerful rural wing, but came to grief over the Locarno Treaties. By serving in a government that signed Locarno, which recognized Alsace-Lorraine as part of France and voluntarily agreed to accept the demilitarized status of the Rhineland, many party activists charged that Westarp had committed another "betrayal" by serving in a government that accepted the "robbery" of what was claimed to be German land. A result of this anger was that even through the DNVP ministers had served in the Cabinet that had signed Locarno, the party's MdRs voted against ratifying Locarno in the Reichstag, and the DNVP walked out of the government in protest at Locarno. Another problem for the DNVP was the 1926 referendum, in which the Communists proposed to confiscate without compensation all of the property belonging to the former Imperial and royal families of Germany and give it to small farmers, homeless people and those living on war pensions. The DNVP leadership was totally against the idea of expropriating the property of royalty, but many of its voters, especially small farmers, were not and voted yes on 20 June 1926, a development that strongly suggested that many DNVP voters were starting to feel that the party leadership was not representing them effectively.

Westarp's efforts to include the DNVP within the government tied himself and the party in many knots since he had to engage in compromises with his coalition partners that offended much of the party's grass-roots, especially the more hardline fraction that disapproved of participation in the government while all the time insisting that he was staying faithful to the party's original platform of relentless opposition to the republic, which made him look both insincere and unprincipled. This was particularly the case because Westarp continued to maintain that he was a monarchist utterly committed to restoring the House of Hohenzollern while his party was participating in a republican government. An especially difficult case for Westarp came in 1927 when it became time to renew the Law for the Protection of the Republic, a law passed in 1922 in the aftermath of Rathenau's assassination, and which was clearly aimed at the DNVP for its incitement of murder at the time. Section V of the law had implicitly banned the former Emperor Wilhelm II from returning to Germany, an aspect of the law that greatly offended the DNVP at the time. By 1927, many of the DNVP's supporters, especially the Junkers had concluded the restoration of the monarchy was not possible, and so successfully pressured Westarp into voting for a renewal of the law rather than see the DNVP walk out of the government and thereby lose a chance for higher tariffs on agricultural imports. Westarp attempted to justify his support of the law he had once opposed by arguing that it was really aimed at the Communists while at the same time claiming the DNVP was opposed in principle to the Law for the Protection of the Republic.

A further problem for the DNVP was the rise of rural rage in the late 1920s. By 1927, though Germany itself was overall very prosperous, a steep economic decline had begun in rural areas, which was only to greatly worsen with the coming of the Great Depression in 1929. By late 1927, it was clear that the increases in agrarian tariffs that the DNVP ministers had forced through had made no impact on the continuing economic decline in the countryside, and as result a mood of palpable anger and resentment had set in the countryside of northern Germany with many DNVP voters damning their own party. The political repercussion of rural rage was the rise of a number of small parties representing rural voters in northern Germany such as the Agricultural League, German Farmers' Party and the Christian-National Peasants' and Farmers' Party, which all took away traditional DNVP voters, a development that contributed significantly to DNVP's poor showing in the 1928 elections. Finally, Admiral Tirpitz who had done so much for the DNVP's good showing in elections in 1924, had often come into conflict with Westarp over his policy of half-hearted participation in the government, and chose not to run in 1928, claiming very publicly that the DNVP needed more aggressive leaders than Westarp. The man Tirpitz chose to continue his work of winning Bavaria for the DNVP, General Paul von Lettow-Vorbeck did not have the same mass appeal and in 1928, the DNVP won only half the vote in Bavaria that it managed to do in December 1924.

=== Hugenberg and the national bloc: the Young Plan referendum ===
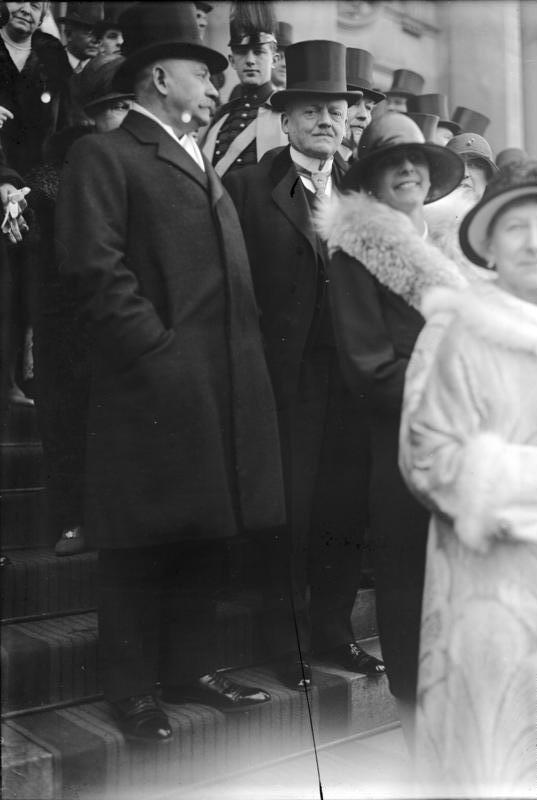
In October 1928, Westarp was deposed as the DNVP's leader.

The disastrous showing at the polls in the Reichstag election of 20 May 1928 (the party's share of votes fell from 21% in 1924 to 14% in 1928) led to a new outbreak of party in-fighting. The immediate cause of the in-fighting was an article published in July 1928 entitled "Monarchism" (Monarchismus) by Walther Lambach, a board member of the German National Association of Commercial Employees (DHV). In his article, Lambach stated that the restoration of the monarchy was no longer possible and that for almost all Germans under the age of thirty the DNVP's incessant talk of bringing back the monarchy was irrelevant at best and downright offputting at worse. Lambach wrote that for conservative Germans President Hindenburg had long since replaced the former Kaiser as the object of their affections and that the DNVP's poor showing in the May elections was a result of the party running on a platform of restoring the monarchy, a goal that most Germans were simply not interested in. Lambach's article with its call for the DNVP to transform itself into a party of conservative republicans set off a storm, with the party's core monarchist supporters successfully pressuring Westarp to expel Lambach. Led by Alfred Hugenberg, the enraged monarchists then turned their sights on Westarp himself, claiming he was a weak leader who let republican elements into the party. Hugenberg was helped by the fact that only 15% of DNVP voters were party members, and the local party offices were dominated by members of the local aristocracy, retired civil servants from the Wilhelmine era and professional lobbyists, making the membership of the DVNP far more right-wing than its voters. The American historian John Leopold noted that the local offices "...tended to accept hard-line propaganda literally, but the interest groups which filled the party's coffers insisted on coalition and compromise. Parliamentary leaders schooled in rationalizing varied principles followed the dictates of lobbyists in the Reichstag, but then reverted to an ideological approach when on the stump...Radicals exploited the divergence of principle and practice. Had party leaders instructed their electorate in the realities of politics, the DVNP might have evolved into the dynamic conservative party that some Reichstag delegates belateldly envisioned."

In October 1928, Hugenberg, leader of the party's hardliner wing, became chairman. Hugenberg returned the party to a course of fundamental opposition against the Republic with a greater emphasis on nationalism and reluctant co-operation with the Nazi Party. Hugenberg was utterly devoid of personal charisma or charm, but he was a successful industrialist and media magnate, a fabulously wealthy man whose talents at devising business strategies which had made him a millionaire many times over were felt to be equally applicable to the arena of politics.

Hugenberg was elected leader largely through the support of the faction associated with the Pan-German League who had been steadily taking over the party's grass-roots ever since the Dawes Plan vote of 1924, and who wanted a return to the politics of the early 1920s. Hugenberg and Heinrich Class, the League's leader had been friends since the 1890s, and Hugenberg was a founding member of the League. Reflecting this background, Hugenberg proved himself to be a consistent champion of German imperialism, and one of the major themes of his time as leader was the call for Germany to resume overseas expansion and to regain the lost colonies in Africa. The other theme that he first set out in an article in the autumn of 1928 entitled "Party Bloc or Mush" (Block oder Brei) was that the DNVP should transform from a broad but heterogeneous and divided party of notables (in Hugenberg's words "mush") into a coherent and clear-cut force with a hierarchical leadership (Führerprinzip) and mass appeal, stressing plebiscitary action rather than parliamentarianism. Hugenberg declared that what was needed a "bloc" of like-minded people that would be solid as stone in upholding its values. About Hugenberg, British historian Edgar Feuchtwanger wrote:

Hugenberg was an abrasive, stubborn, difficult personality, opinionated and confrontational. His emergence into a central position in right-wing politics had a very divisive effect which in the end benefited only Hitler. Many on the right, from Hindenburg downwards, including members of the Ruhrlade, the inner cabinet of the western coal and steel industry, found him increasingly wrong-headed and impossible to work with. When Hugenberg began to attract the political limelight his characteristic slogan was "solid or mash" (Block oder Brei). Those who wanted a broad conservative party able to influence republican politics were the mash, his prescription was dynamic force through principled confrontation.

In July 1929, Hugenberg decided that the best way of regaining popularity was to use the section of the Weimar constitution that allowed upon collecting a certain number of signatures a referendum to be held, in this case on the Young Plan. Hugenberg successfully collected enough signatures to initiate a referendum on his Freedom Law which called for cancelling the Young Plan together with all reparations. The fact that the Young Plan reduced reparations and committed the Allies to exiting the Rhineland in June 1930 (which was five years earlier than what Versailles had called for) was irrelevant to Hugenberg. He argued that a properly patriotic government would not pay any reparations at all and would force the Allies to leave the Rhineland at once. As such, Hugenberg drafted "A Bill against the Enslavement of the German People" which declared acceptance of the Young Plan to be high treason under the grounds that Germany should not have to pay any reparations, and that those ministers who signed the Young Plan on behalf of the Reich government and those who voted for the Young Plan in the Reichstag should be prosecuted for high treason. Hugenberg made much of the fact that Young Plan was not scheduled to end until 1988, which he portrayed in stark terms as forcing generations of Germans to live under a crushing burden of reparations for the next sixty years (Hugenberg did not mention the fact that the Young Plan was not scheduled to end until 1988 because the plan had greatly reduced annual reparation payments, which was why the payments had been spread out over sixty years).

In pushing for the referendum on the Young Plan, Hugenberg was quite consciously seeking to polarize German politics into two extremes, namely the "national" camp opposed to the Young Plan and everyone else, believing that such a polarization would work for his own benefit. Hugenberg saw compromise and negotiation as so much weakness that led to DNVP's poor showing in the elections of May 1928 and believed that the best chances for the DNVP to come to power was by creating a political climate where no compromise and negotiation was possible by seeking to divide Germany into two diametrically opposed blocs with no middle ground in between. Hugenberg did not actually expect to win the referendum on the Young Plan, but rather the referendum was intended to be in the modern parlance a wedge issue that would polarize politics and create a situation where one would either be for or against the "national" camp. The American historian John Leopold wrote that "Hugenberg debated political issues in terms of a simplistic, philosophic disjunction—a man was either for the nation or he was against it". This was especially the case because the "Grand Coalition" government of the Social Democratic Chancellor Hermann Müller was composed of the left-wing SPD, the right of center Catholic Zentrum, the liberal DDP and the moderate conservative DVP—in short all of the parties that Hugenberg was seeking to destroy by forcing them to defend the Young Plan, and therefore making it seem they were in favor of paying reparations and the Treaty of Versailles. In fact, the parties of the "Grand Coalition" were in favor of a gradualist, step-by-step approach of doing away with Versailles by negotiation instead of the confrontational Katastrophenpolitik (catastrophe politics) of the early 1920s that led to the disastrous Ruhrkampf and hyper-inflation of 1923, a nuance that did not interest Hugenberg in the slightest. Hugenberg for his part regarded Katastrophenpolitik as a good idea that was unfortunately abandoned, and made it clear that he wanted a return to Katastrophenpolitik.

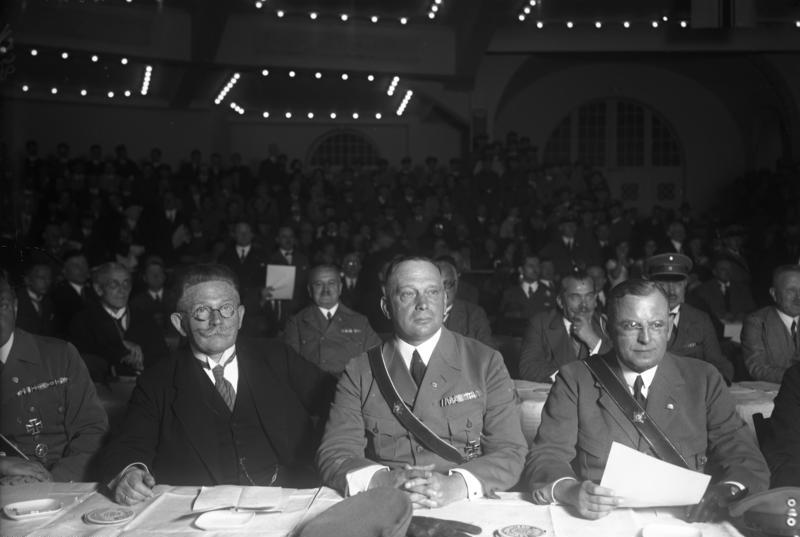
Franz Seldte (right) with Alfred Hugenberg and Major Franz von Stephani at a rally against the Young Plan, Berlin Sportpalast, 1929

In seeking a vote on the "Freedom Law", Hugenberg was seeking nothing less than to begin the destruction of all of the middle-of-the-road parties in Germany in order to achieve a situation where the only alternatives for German voters would be the "national" parties and the Marxist parties. Hugenberg had initially planned in the winter of 1928–29 to use as his wedge issue a plan for constitutional reform, but dropped it in favor of a referendum on the Young Plan when he discovered that the idea of constitutional reform was too abstract for most people, and that portraying the Young Plan as a monstrous form of financial "slavery" for our "children's children" was much more visceral, emotional and effective way of appealing to public opinion. The Canadian historian Richard Hamilton wrote that Freedom Law was pure demagoguery since rejection of the Young Plan would not mean the end of reparations as Hugenberg claimed, but rather Germany would continue to pay higher reparations under the Dawes Plan.

As part of his polarizing gambit, Hugenberg created the Reichsausschuß (committee) for the People's Rebellion Against the Young Plan in the summer of 1929, which was intended to be a sort of counter-parliament to the Reichstag. The Reichsausschuß comprised Hugenberg, Heinrich Class of the Pan-German League, Franz Seldte of Der Stahlehlm and Adolf Hitler of the NSDAP. Hugenberg saw himself as the leader of the Reichsausschuß and believed through the Reichsausschuß he would become the leader of the entire right-wing national bloc and in turn the bloc he intended to create would at last win enough seats in the Reichstag to have a majority. In the summer of 1929, two prominent DNVP Reichstag deputies Gottfried Treviranus and Hans Schlange-Schöningen resigned from the party's caucus in protest against the "Freedom Law" as Hugenberg's referendum bill was known which they called irresponsible in the extreme. They would be joined shortly afterwards by the former chairman Count Kuno von Westarp and 20 other DNVP MdRs leaving the party in December 1929 to form the more moderate Conservative People's Party. The DNVP rebels objected in particular to the part of the "Freedom Law" which called for the prosecution of President Paul von Hindenburg on charges of high treason for fulfilling his constitutional obligation by signing the Young Plan into law after it been passed by the Reichstag. The rebels also objected to the prosecution of the entire Cabinet for endorsing the Young Plan and all of the MdRs for voting to ratify the plan, which the rebel faction called the height of demagogy. In the first 15 months of being led by the abrasive Hugenberg the DNVP was to lose 43 out of its 78 MdRs. Many Ruhr industrialists who normally supported the DNVP such as Abraham Frowein, Clemens Lammers, Carl Friedrich von Siemens, and Paul Silverberg signed a petition in the fall of 1929 objecting to the section of the "Freedom Law" calling for the prosecution of those politicians who supported the Young Plan as "detrimental" to the workings of politics and stated that a victory for the Yes side in the referendum on the Freedom Law "would frustrate all efforts at improving the German situation for the foreseeable future". Hugenberg's leadership brought about a break with the industrialists who were greatly displeased with Hugenberg's unwillingness to take part in coalition governments. As a result, from 1929 onwards the millionaire Hugenberg spent his own considerable fortune to provide the funding for the DNVP. The dependence of the DNVP on Hugenberg to provide the bulk of the election funds very much strengthened Hugenberg's leadership, making it impossible to challenge.

Hugenberg's efforts led to the Young Plan referendum on 22 December 1929. The NSDAP were one of the groups which joined Hugenberg's campaign against the Young Plan, and the resulting wave of publicity brought Adolf Hitler back into the limelight after five years of obscurity following his trial for high treason in 1924. After his trial in 1924, Hitler had been largely ignored; the 1929 edition of the diaries of Lord D'Abernon, the British ambassador to Germany 1920–26 had a footnote that read: "He [Hitler] was finally released after six months and bound over for the rest of his sentence, thereafter fading into oblivion". At the various campaign rallies against the Young Plan in the autumn of 1929, the charismatic Hitler easily out-shone the stuffy Hugenberg, who as one of his aides Reinhold Quaatz wrote in his diary had "no political sex appeal". Hugenberg was such an inept speaker that he almost never spoke before the Reichstag because his speeches induced laughter amongst those who listened to them. The fact that Admiral Tirpitz of the DNVP appeared alongside and spoke with Hitler at the anti-Young Plan rallies was taken by many of the DNVP voters as a sign that Hitler was now a respectable figure who was rubbing shoulders with war heroes. The referendum of 1929 brought about a major surge of interest in the National Socialists. Indeed, for many it marked the first time that they ever heard of Hitler, and it led during the winter of 1929–30 to a huge influx of new members into the NSDAP. Hamilton wrote that it was the 1929 referendum, which the National Socialists had treated as a gigantic 5-month-long free political ad (Hugenberg had paid for the entire referendum out of his own pocket) running from July to December 1929 that had enabled them to enter the political mainstream just as the Great Depression was beginning.

=== Decline and fall, 1930–1932 ===
Hugenberg had wanted to keep the Reichsausschuß going even after the failure of the Freedom Law referendum, but the Reichsausschuß dissolved in the spring of 1930 when the National Socialists walked out of it. When Hugenberg was forced in April 1930 to temporarily vote for the "presidential government" of Chancellor Heinrich Brüning that he was otherwise opposed to, in order to prevent the entire rural wing of the DNVP from seceding over the issue of tariffs, Hitler accused Hugenberg of weakness, and terminated the NSDAP's co-operation with the DNVP.

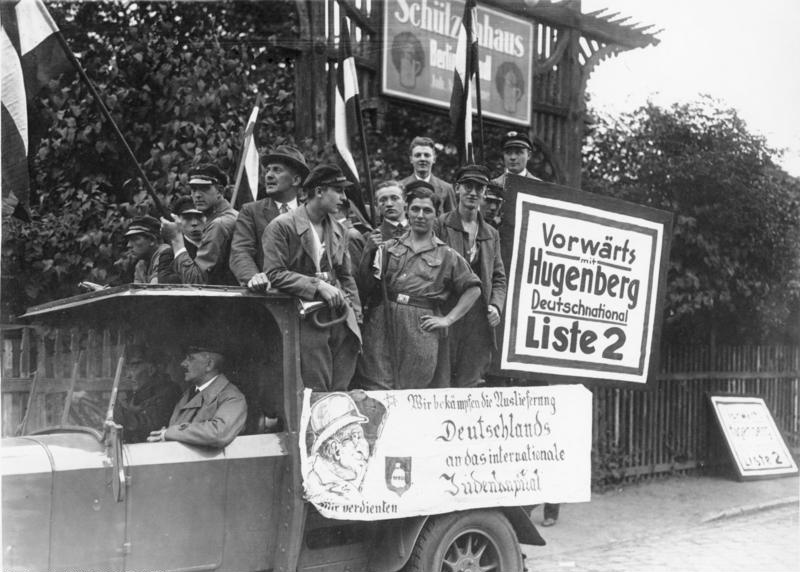
Antisemitic DNVP slogan during elections in 1930

Reflecting the changed political dynamics caused by the Young Plan referendum, in the election of 14 September 1930 the DNVP's share of the vote dropped dramatically to 7% while the NSDAP's share rose up equally dramatically to 18% (compared to the NSDAP's 2.6% of the vote in 1928). This marked the NSDAP's electoral breakthrough to the mainstream. Since the NSDAP did very well in areas that had traditionally voted for the DNVP like East Prussia and Pomerania, the German historian Martin Broszat wrote that would strongly suggest that most of the DNVP voters had deserted their old party for the NSDAP. Broszat argued that what happened between 1929 and 1932 was that the supporters of the radical right-wing DNVP had abandoned it for the even more radical right-wing NSDAP. Hugenberg had decided to use as his next wedge issue to destroy the middle-of-the-road parties that supported the Weimar Republic the theme of anti-Marxism (in the Weimar Republic the term Marxism was to describe both the SPD and the KPD). The media mogul Hugenberg used his vast press empire to wage a hysterical campaign warning his papers' mostly middle-class readers that Marxist SPD and KPD were going to mobilize the millions of unemployed created by the Great Depression to stage a bloody revolution and that only an authoritarian regime willing to use the most drastic means could save Germany. The Comintern's Third Period, which meant that the Communists spent most of their time attacking the Social Democrats as "social fascists" was not reported by the Hugenberg press, which instead portrayed the KPD and the SPD as working together for a revolution. The Hugenberg papers argued that only the DNVP could save Germany from revolution, and that democracy and civil liberties were major impediments to battling the supposed Marxist revolution that was just on the verge of happening. The major beneficiaries of the Hugenberg press's anti-Marxist campaign were not the DNVP as intended, but rather the National Socialists who were able to portray themselves as the most effective anti-Marxist fighting force.

The DNVP was declining rapidly as many workers and peasants began to support the more populist and less aristocratic NSDAP while upper-class and middle-class DNVP voters supported the NSDAP as the "party of order" best able to crush Marxism. Hugenberg pursued with a vengeance those DNVP deputies who left to form the Conservative People's Party, whom Hugenberg called Weimar-supporting "Tory democrats" (democrat being a term of abuse for Hugenberg) who he believed practiced a watered down conservatism along the line of the British Conservative Party without any völkisch or monarchist convictions. Hugenberg's vendetta against the Conservatives meant that he focused most of his time on attacking them in the 1930 election, sending the Stahlhelm in to disturb speeches by Westarp and spent little time defending the DNVP against the attacks of the NSDAP. During the 1930 election, the DNVP issued a statement proclaiming that there were no important differences between them and the NSDAP on the "Jewish Question", arguing that the few differences that did exist concerned a small number of the "radical demands of the NSDAP" which were "hardly important since in practice they cannot be implemented".

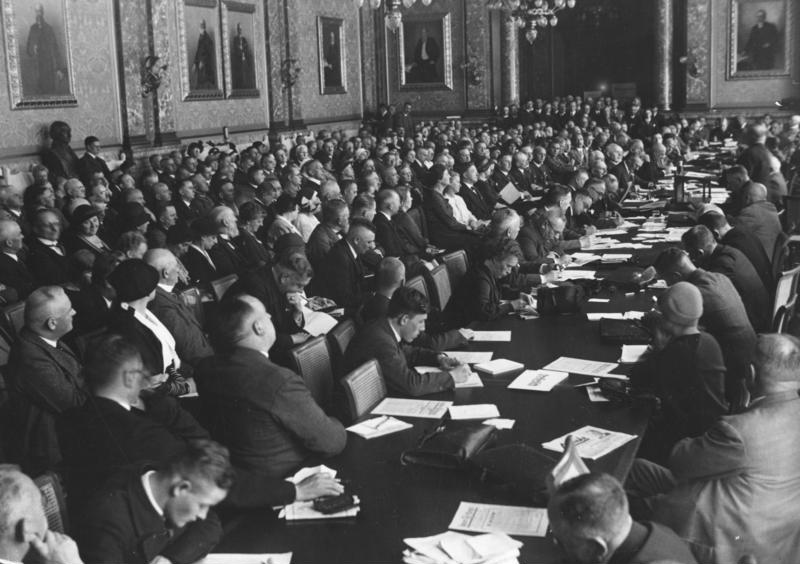
DNVP convention in 1932

Despite the bitterness caused by the 1930 election, in February 1931 Hugenberg met with Hitler to discuss common co-operation on a referendum for early elections in Prussia that were intended to defeat the government of the Social Democrat Otto Braun, and thereby allow a NSDAP/DNVP coalition to win the resulting elections. As part of their efforts to co-operate, the NSDAP and the DNVP MdRs walked out of the Reichstag on 11 February 1931 to protest the high-handed ways of the Brüning government. During the summer of 1931, the DNVP, the NSDAP and the KPD all joined forces in campaigning for a yes vote in the Prussian referendum, which led the liberal Berliner Morgenpost newspaper to write of an alliance of "the swastika and the Soviet star" who were engaging in Katastrophenpolitik. Despite their vehemently expressed anti-communism both the DNVP and the NSDAP were prepared to co-operate with the Communists when it suited their purposes as in the case of the Prussian referendum. Hugenberg argued that Prussian referendum was necessary to force out the Braun government whom he accused of responsibility for "the decline in the German economy, the bad state of the finances and the chaos in governance". On 9 August 1931 when the Prussian referendum was held, the NSDAP, DNVP and the KPD failed in their effort to force an early election in Prussia with yes side winning 37% of the vote.

In its September 1931 platform adopted at a convention in Stettin laying out the party's principles, it was stated as follows:

Only a strong German nationality that consciously preserves its nature and essence and keeps itself free of foreign influence can provide the foundation for a strong German state. For that reason we resist the undermining, un-German spirit in all forms, whether it stems from Jewish or other circles. We are emphatically opposed to the prevalence of Judaism in the government and public life, which has emerged ever more ominously since the revolution. The flow of foreigners across our borders is to be prohibited.

The same platform called for the "liberation of Germany" (i.e. doing away with the Treaty of Versailles), restoring the monarchy under the Hohenzollern family, a return to the policy of pre-1914 navalism in order to make Germany a world power, a "strong state" to combat the Great Depression and a "moral rebirth of our people" by the "deepening of Christian awareness".

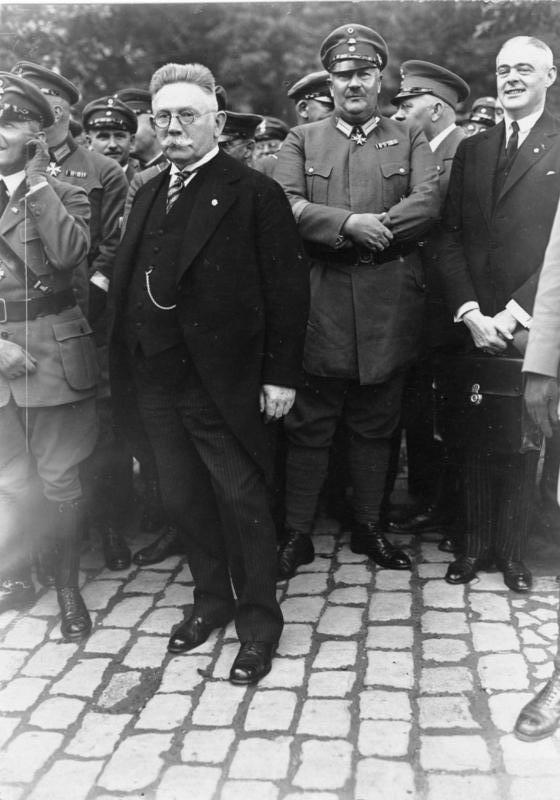
Hugenberg (on the left) and Prince Eitel Friedrich of Prussia, 10 October 1931

On 11 October 1931, the DNVP, the NSDAP, the Pan-German League, the Reichslandbund, the German People's Party and the Stahlhelm paramilitary organisation briefly formed an uneasy alliance known as the Harzburg Front. Attending the Bad Harzburg rally were most of the figures of the German right ranging from General Hans von Seeckt, Heinrich Class, Franz Seldte, General Walther von Lüttwitz, Admiral Adolf von Trotha, the economist Hjalmar Schacht, Crown Prince Wilhelm, Admiral Magnus von Levetzow, Prince Oskar of Prussia, Prince Eitel Friedrich, and on to figures such as Hugenberg and Hitler. The Harzburger Front was Hugenberg's attempt to create on a more institutional basis the Reichsausschuß of 1929, and under his leadership, thereby form the "national bloc" that he confidently believed would sweep him into power in the near-future. Wheeler-Bennett called the Harzburg rally "the formal declaration of war by the parties of the Right against the Brüning government-a concentration of all the forces of reaction, both past and present, in one great demonstration of hostility to the Weimar System". At the meetings to work out a policy platform for the Harzburger Front, the German historian Karl Dietrich Bracher wrote that Hugenberg made concessions to his partners in the front "with the indulgence born of assured arrogance that is fed by the certainty of being in command".

The DNVP hoped to control the NSDAP through this coalition and to curb the Nazis' extremism, but the pact only served to strengthen the NSDAP by giving it access to funding and political respectability while obscuring the DNVP's own less extreme platform. The Harzburger Front proved to be a failure, and by the end of 1931 the National Socialists were increasingly lashing out against their nominal allies. In February 1932 over the course of long talks, the DNVP and the NSDAP failed to agree on a common candidate for the presidential elections, and on 17 February 1932 Hitler unilaterally announced in a press release that he was running for president. This action effectively destroyed the Harzburger Front as Hugenberg had not been consulted before-hand. Hugenberg had much difficulty in recruiting a DVNP candidate for the presidential election as Prince Oskar of Prussia, the industrialist Albert Vögler, and General Otto vow Below all declined to run. Theodor Duesterberg was recruited as the DNVP presidential candidate more by default as he was the only one willing to run for the DNVP. In the first round of the presidential election on 13 March 1932, the DNVP supported Theodor Duesterberg, and after he withdrew from the race following his dreadful showing, endorsed no candidate for the second round on 10 April 1932. In the first round of the election, Duesterberg won only 6.8% of the vote compared to 30% of the vote won by Hitler while Hindenburg won 49.6% of the vote.

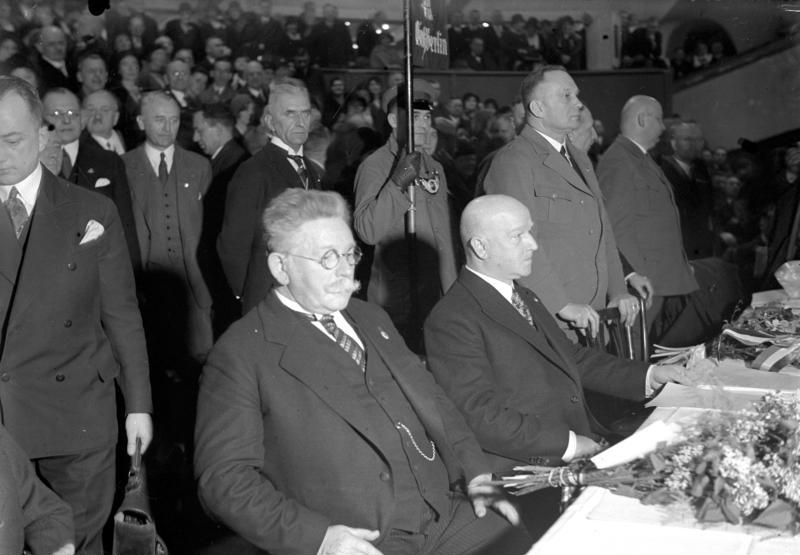
Theodor Duesterberg (right) with Hugenberg (left) in 1932

In June 1932, the DNVP became the only significant party to support Franz von Papen in his short tenure as Chancellor. Hugenberg wanted to join von Papen's government, but was vetoed by President von Hindenburg who disliked Hugenberg. However, the two DNVP men who did serve in von Papen's government, namely Baron Wilhelm von Gayl as Interior minister and Franz Gürtner as Justice Minister, where both were noted for their hostility to democracy and support for authoritarianism. The first act of the von Papen government was to dissolve the Reichstag two years into its mandate. In a speech on 26 June 1932, Hugenberg designated the Nazis as now being an opponent of the national front. One of the DNVP's members, Count Ewald von Kleist-Schmenzin wrote a pamphlet for the election entitled Der Nationalsozialismus – eine Gefahr ("National Socialism – A Menace") that attacked the NSDAP for the neo-paganism of one of its members, Alfred Rosenberg, and urged voters to choose the DNVP. At the same time, the NSDAP ridiculed the DNVP as the party of monarchist reactionaries without a clue as to how to deal with the Great Depression and who cared only for the rich. On 20 July 1932, during the run-up to the Reichstag election of 31 June, the von Papen government carried out the Preußenschlag, a coup by which the Reich government deposed the SPD-dominated Prussian government of Otto Braun, usurping it by making Papen the Reich Commissar of Prussia. Baron von Gayl, the DNVP Interior Minister played a key role in planning the "Rape of Prussia" together with Chancellor von Papen and the Defense Minister General Kurt von Schleicher as part of the move towards authoritarian government by destroying one of the strongest pillars of democracy in Germany. In this way, the DNVP finally achieved its long sought goal of removing the Braun government.

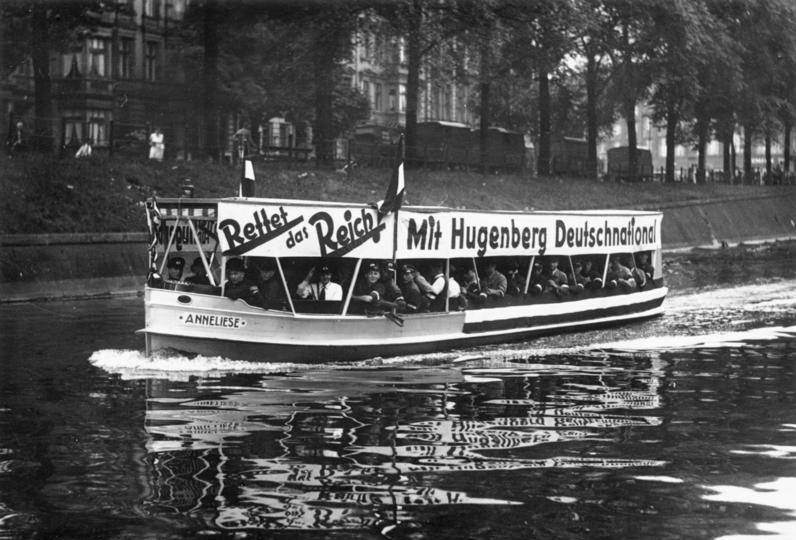
The DNVP campaigns in Berlin, July 1932

In the Reichstag election of 31 July 1932, the DNVP posted its worst result ever, winning only 5.9% of the vote while the NSDAP won 37%. On 12 September 1932 the DNVP and the DVP were the only parties to vote for the von Papen government when it was defeated on a massive motion of no confidence in the Reichstag. In response to losing the motion von Papen dissolved the Reichstag again. In the elections in fall of 1932 the DNVP made overtures to the NSDAP attempting to reform the Harzburg front. The German historian Hermann Beck wrote that the election in the autumn 1932 was the "absolute nadir" of DNVP-NSDAP relations when Hitler had decided to make the DNVP the main target in the election. The National Socialist newspaper Der Angriff in an editorial written by Joseph Goebbels called for a "Reckoning with the Hugenzwerg" (a portmanteau of Hugenberg and "pygmy"), and dismissively commented that Hugenberg must be a magician since there was no other way that he could hope to "turn an insignificant heap of reactionaries" into a mass movement. DNVP election meetings were the targets of Nazi stink bombs and heckling while the DNVP politician Countess Helene von Watter was threatened with a beating by Nazis. Another DNVP politician (Theodor Duesterberg) was heckled with shouts of "Jew boy!" while Baron Axel von Freytagh-Loringhoven of the DNVP was accused of high treason for having allegedly fought against Germany as an Imperial Russian Army officer in World War I. Goebbels organized a boycott of the Scherl newspapers and press owned by Hugenberg while encouraged a strike at the Scherel press.". At a debate at the Berlin Sports Palace between Goebbels and Hugenberg's right-hand man, Otto Schmidt-Hanover, thousands of Nazis showed up to boo Schmidt-Hanover and cheer on Goebbels; who won the debate by being the only one allowed to speak for any length of time. Leopold wrote that; "the DNVP was rooted in the attitudes and traditions of the nineteenth century. It comprised men of property and education who patronized inferiors while scorning democratic idealism and loathing socialistic egalitarianism. Older men raised in the prewar era of peace and prosperity, the German Nationals identified their superiority as social, intellectual and racial. Hugenberg himself typified their Pan-German idealism and expansionism. Hitler and the Nazis were products of the twentieth century. Alienated and deprived, inured by the hardships of the war, the frustrations of inflation, and the humiliation of the depression, these were men of action. No Spenglerian historicizing for them; power was the goal". Despite this, the conflict between the Nazis and the Left Wing parties was much more intense.

Gauleiter Wilhelm Kube—who himself had once belonged to the DNVP in the years 1919–23—called in a speech to "fight the DNVP to the death". Hugenberg's main line of attack on the NSDAP in the fall of 1932 was that Germany's chief danger was "Bolshevism" and there was no difference between the "red Bolshevism" of the KPD and the "brown Bolshevism" of the NSDAP. In October 1932, the NSDAP had lost some middle-class backing when it came out in support of a strike by transport workers in Berlin, which also happened to be supported by the KPD, Goebbels reasoned that this was necessary as support from conservative aristocrats could be won back, but they would lose what little sway the Nazi party had on working-class Berlin if they didn't support the strike. In the election on 6 November 1932, the DNVP made a small improvement over its dismal showing in July, winning 8.3% of the vote, a gain made entirely at the expense of the NSDAP. Despite all the bitterness of the election battles of 1932 Hugenberg cautiously opened talks with Hitler in December 1932 with the aim of reviving the Harzburger Front of 1931. This was a reflection of the fact that it was now very hard to imagine that the DNVP could come to power without the NSDAP.

=== Bringing Hitler to power, January 1933 ===
On 3 January 1933, Hitler and Von Papen had what was supposed to be a secret meeting that however was revealed by the press. Hugenberg was aware at least in general that Hitler and Von Papen were having talks on forming a new government, but was uncertain about just what exactly was happening, and did not want to see Hitler as Chancellor. In January 1933, upset that the government of General Kurt von Schleicher failed to heed its promise to raise tariffs on agriculture imports, the Agricultural League issued on 11 January 1933 a vehement press release calling Schleicher "the tool of the almighty money-bag interests of internationally oriented export industry and its satellites" and accused Schleicher of "an indifference to the impoverishment of agriculture beyond the capacity of even a purely Marxist regime". The statement attacking Schleicher was issued by the Agrarian League, not the DNVP, but as the Agrarian League was a powerful pressure group within the DNVP, the statement effectively forced the DNVP to oppose the Schleicher government and thus severely limited Hugenberg's options. On 13 January, Schleicher met with Hugenberg and offered him the chance to serve as minister of agriculture and economics, an offer that Hugenberg said he was willing to accept only if Schleicher would end his efforts to secure the support of the Zentrum, a demand that proved unacceptable. Knowing that Hitler and Von Papen were discussing a new government, and hoping for a chance to join the proposed government even through he was not quite certain who was to head it, Hugenberg decided on 21 January 1933 to send the DNVP MP Otto Schmidt-Hanover to inform General Schleicher that the DNVP was opposed to his government because of his supposed indifference to the suffering of German farmers, and it would vote for a motion of no confidence once the Reichstag reconvened at the end of January. By this move, Hugenberg hoped that this would lead to the DNVP joining the proposed "Government of National Concentration", even though he did not know who the Chancellor was going to be. Hugenberg's major fear in January 1933 was that Hitler and Von Papen might form the "Government of National Concentration" without the DNVP, and he was determined that if such a government be created that he be part of it. The American historian Henry Ashby Turner wrote that Hugenberg was driven in January 1933 by "...opportunistic considerations...a desperate desire to gain a measure of power as he approached the end of a frustrating political career".

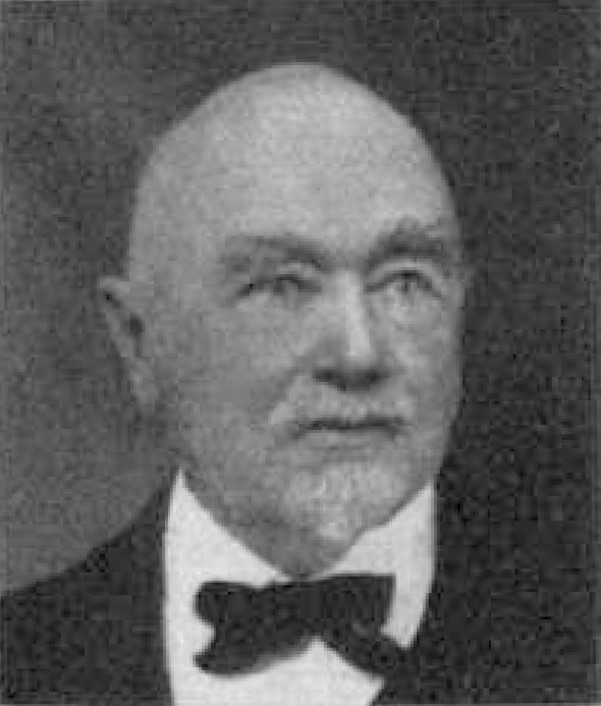
Elard von Oldenburg-Januschau, whose advice to President Hindenburg to appoint Adolf Hitler Chancellor in January 1933 played an important role in bringing Hitler to power

Hugenberg himself wanted Von Papen to return to power, but found that was not an option in late January 1933 as Von Papen had abandoned his demand to once more be Chancellor on 19 January 1933 and was now supporting Hitler as Chancellor. Faced with this situation, Hugenberg decided that the best that could be hoped for was to support Hitler as Chancellor while seeking to "neutralize" the Nazis by imposing restrictions on a Hitler government that would limit its freedom of action. At a secret meeting at Joachim von Ribbentrop's house on 24 January 1933 attended by Hermann Göring, Wilhelm Frick, Ribbentrop and Von Papen, they worked out the plan that the best way of overcoming President von Hindenburg's opposition to appointing Hitler Chancellor was by creating a right-wing "government of national concentration" that would ensure the Chancellorship went to Hitler while giving the impression that Hitler's power would be limited by creating a coalition government of all the German right. From this viewpoint, it was important to include the DNVP in the proposed Hitler government as a way of reassuring Hindenburg. At the same time, Hindenburg was visited by his friend and neighbor in East Prussia, the DNVP politician Count Elard von Oldenburg-Januschau, the grand old man of German conservatism and the leader of the DNVP's extreme right-wing Junker fraction, who told the President that he should appoint Hitler chancellor and that his fears about what Hitler might do as Chancellor were groundless. As Hindenburg valued Oldenburg-Januschau's advice, his opinion helped to weaken Hindenburg's resistance to appointing Hitler chancellor.

On 27 January 1933, Ribbentrop invited Hugenberg to a secret meeting at his house in an attempt to win his participation in the proposed "government of national concentration." Hugenberg had nearly scuttled Hitler's chances of getting the Chancellorship when he objected to Hitler's proposed Cabinet line-up; complaining that too many portfolios went to the Nazis and not enough to the DNVP. On 28 January, Von Papen met with Hugenberg and informed him that he must drop his objections to National Socialists serving as the Reich and Prussian ministries of the Interior (the latter controlled the Prussian police), in exchange for which Von Papen promised Hugenberg that he could have his wish to be "economic dictator" by being given the Reich/Prussian ministries of economics and agriculture. On 29 January 1933, Hugenberg's aide Reinhold Quaatz wrote in his diary the following:

Within the party the ultimatum [to Schleicher] had come as an act of deliverance. With a single blow we stood at the center of events as a sort of pivot; this position however is correspondingly dangerous. If we go with Hitler, we must harness him. Otherwise we are finished, whether he succeeds in grabbing power for himself or if he fails. If a Hitler government does not come about, then Von Papen, Meissner, perhaps even Hindenburg [...] will try to hang the blame on us. We must also prevent a Hitler-Centre coalition, but also avoid a complete falling out with the Centre. It's a game of Russian roulette with five bullets. Fortunately, all the others are dependent on us. Qui vivra, verra.

The (entirely baseless) fear that Hitler might try to form a coalition with the Zentrum which would give him a majority in the Reichstag and thereby allow a dictatorship without the DNVP was the final reason why Hugenberg decided to join the Hitler government.

=== In the Hitler government ===
Performing badly in subsequent elections, the party chose to be a junior coalition partner to the NSDAP in the so-called, short-lived Regierung der nationalen Konzentration (Government of National Concentration) upon Adolf Hitler's appointment as Chancellor in 1933. Although Hugenberg had severe doubts about Hitler as Chancellor he agreed to serve in a Hitler government provided that he was made "economic dictator" by being appointed Minister of Economics and Agriculture on both the Reich and Prussian levels. He was one of eight ministers in the government that were either members of the DNVP or were backed by it. The Nazis were limited to three seats in cabinet, and only two with portfolios—the chancellorship for Hitler and the then-powerless Interior Ministry for Frick (Göring was a minister without portfolio). The cabinet's makeup was conceived by Von Papen and Hindenburg in hopes of keeping Hitler in check and making him their puppet. On the morning of 30 January 1933 when the Hitler cabinet was going to be sworn in by President von Hindenburg, just minutes before the ceremony was going to be performed, a major dispute arose between Hitler and the cantankerous, bad-tempered Hugenberg when the latter learned that Hitler was going to violate his promise not to call early elections, and was planning on dissolving the Reichstag as soon as possible. The shouting match between the two men delayed the swearing in of the cabinet and was only finally mediated by Presidential state secretary Otto Meissner who warned Hitler and Hugenberg that Hindenburg would not wait forever and by Von Papen who told Hugenberg that he should never doubt the word of a fellow German.

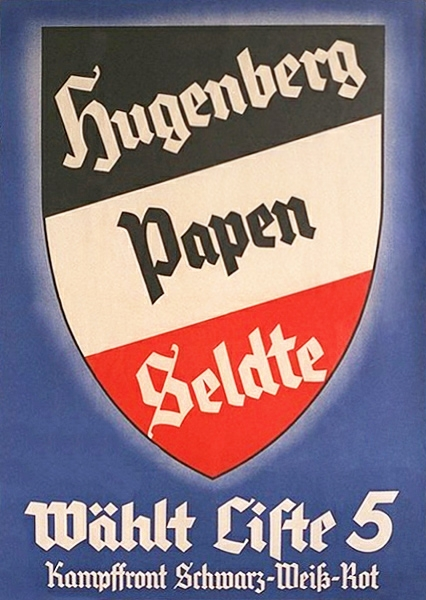
Poster for the nationalist Black-White-Red coalition of DVNP leader Hugenberg, Franz von Papen and Franz Seldte for the elections of March 1933

On 30 January 1933 Hugenberg was sworn in by Hindenburg to serve in Hitler's government as Economics and Agriculture minister as he had requested. During his time in Hitler's cabinet Hugenberg did not stand in the way of Hitler's efforts to make himself a dictator. As mentioned above, many prominent DNVP members had long favoured scrapping Weimar's democracy in favour of an authoritarian system. After the Reichstag fire, Hugenberg gave a speech that spoke of the necessity for "draconic measures" and of "exterminating the hotbeds in which Bolshevism can flourish". Hugenberg argued that "in these earnest times there can no longer be any half-measures...no compromise, no cowardice". At a Cabinet meeting Hugenberg together with the other DNVP cabinet ministers voted for the Reichstag Fire Decree, which effectively wiped out civil liberties. The decree was based largely on a proposal by Ludwig Grauert, a DNVP member who had recently been named chief of the Prussian state police, to provide legal cover for the mass arrests of Communists on the night of the fire. On the afternoon of 27 February—hours before the fire—Gürtner had submitted a draft decree which, like the Reichstag Fire Decree, would have imposed draconian restrictions on civil liberties in the name of curbing Communist violence. One of the few DNVP members who protested against participation in the Hitler government was Count Ewald von Kleist-Schmenzin who sent Hugenberg a letter on 13 February 1933 resigning from the party in protest against the coalition with the Nazis.

On 23 March 1933, the entire DNVP Reichstag delegation voted for the Enabling Act, which gave the Cabinet the power to make laws without parliamentary consent, effectively making Hitler a dictator. Many Communist and Socialist representatives were unable to vote, being held in Nazi-organized holding camps at the time of the vote.

In early May 1933, the DNVP changed its name to the German National Front (DNF), a name change that Hugenberg argued was to better reflect the fact that the era of political parties was coming to a close in Germany. In his capacity as "economic dictator", Hugenberg named as State Secretary at the Economics Ministry Paul Bang, a man mostly noted for his "autarkic ideals and racist fanaticism" who managed to annoy industry with his strongly protectionist tendencies. During his short time as Reich/Prussian Economics and Agriculture Minister, Hugenberg worked to achieve autarky by keeping foreign products out of the German market, for various grandiose schemes for government subsidies for struggling farmers and government schemes to reduce farmers' debts. Most of these actions clashed with more populist plans of the National Socialists. The DNF, though it expressed certain reservations that the wave of antisemitic violence waged by the SA in the spring of 1933 was threatening the rule of law, supported all of the antisemitic laws brought in by the new government. As a group the DNF favored the sort of legalised, bureaucratic antisemitic discrimination expressed in the Law for the Restoration of the Professional Civil Service. It found the sort of lawless antisemitic violence waged by the SA distasteful, even if the party rarely condemned that violence. (By this time the more violent antisemites within the DNVP had long since left for the NSDAP, leaving only those who preferred legalised antisemitism.) One of the very few examples of someone formally associated with the DNVP intervening against antisemitic violence occurred on 1 April 1933, the day of nationwide anti-Jewish boycott, when the Lord Mayor of Leipzig, Carl Friedrich Goerdeler, personally ordered the SA to stop enforcing the boycott. Goerdeler had been one of the rising stars of the DNVP in the 1920s, but in December 1931 he had been offered and accepted the post of Price Commissioner by Zentrum Chancellor Heinrich Brüning. Hugenberg had forbidden Goerdeler from accepting the office, which led to Goerdeler resigning from the DNVP rather than being expelled.

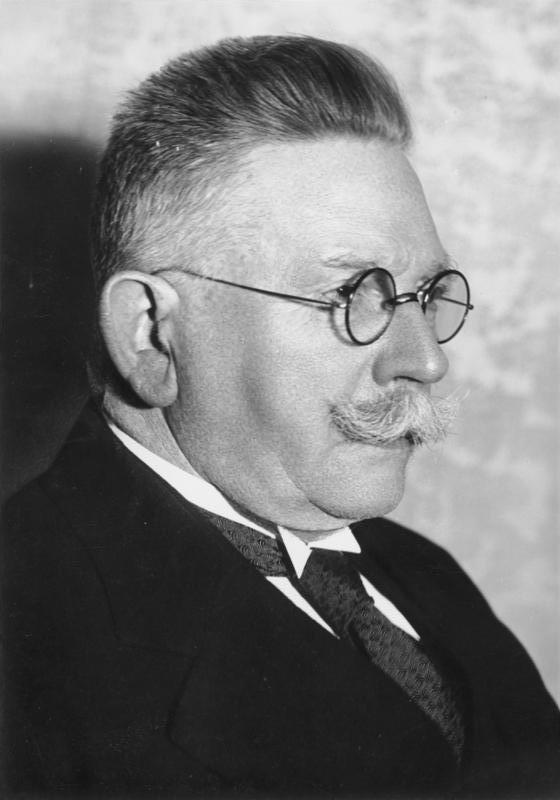
Hugenberg as a minister in the Hitler government, 1933

Hitler's patience with his conservative allies was limited, and it quickly ran out after the passage of the Enabling Act. By voting for it the DNF had served its purpose as far as Hitler was concerned and he had no further need for it. From the spring onward the Nazis started to increasingly attack their allies. In March 1933, DVNP leaders in Frankfurt, Hanover and Kiel were complaining that the police and SA were harassing them. Herbert von Bismarck, the leader of Bismarck Youth, the DVNP's youth wing, was harassed so much that he resigned from his post in the Prussian Interior ministry. In May 1933 a massive press campaign was started by the National Socialist newspapers demanding that Hugenberg resign from the Cabinet. By May 1933, in the Free City of Danzig, the local branch of the NSDAP had turned on the Danzig branch of the DNVP, joining a coalition with the Danzig branch of the Zentrum in the Danzig Senate. The way that the Nazi-dominated government of Danzig was starting to persecute those civil servants who were DNVP members who refused to join the NSDAP was from Hugenberg's viewpoint an ominous precedent.

In addition, Hugenberg, who had headed the German delegation at the London Economic Conference in June 1933 put forth a programme of German colonial expansion in both Africa and Eastern Europe as the best way of ending the Great Depression, which created a major storm at the conference. Before leaving for London Hugenberg had objected to a speech by the Foreign Minister Baron Konstantin von Neurath where Neurath had said about the London conference: "The National Socialist government has shown it is willing to work together with other nations in the political arena. It is in this spirit that it approaches the World Economic Conference." Hugenberg objected to Neurath's speech under the grounds that he was not going to London to work for "harmonious understanding" between nations, but rather he was seeking to assert German interests in the most aggressive manner possible. Besides his sincere belief that Germany needed an empire in Africa and Eastern Europe to recover from the Great Depression, Hugenberg's major reason for putting forth his imperialist programme at the London Economic Conference was that by late May 1933 the DNF was being increasingly persecuted by its nominal Nazi allies, and Hugenberg believed that if he could score an outstanding success in foreign policy, then Hitler would end the persecution of his party. Hugenberg believed that the case for German imperialism as a way of ending the Great Depression not just in Germany, but all over the world was so compelling that he could convert the other delegates at World Economic Conference to his way of thinking. On 16 June 1933 Hugenberg released the "Hugenberg memorandum" to the press in London, and set off a media storm. The Soviet government put forth a diplomatic note protesting against Hugenberg's idea that the Soviet Union was a backward country ripe for German colonization, while the British and French governments protested against Hugenberg's demand that they should just hand over all their colonies in Africa to Germany. The leaders of the rest of the German delegation in London comprising Neurath, the Reichsbank president Hjalmar Schacht and the Finance minister Lutz Graf Schwerin von Krosigk had not been consulted about the "Hugenberg Memorandum" and felt Hugenberg's approach to foreign policy had made him into an embarrassment.

Hugenberg had made himself into an embarrassment for the new regime by being indiscreet enough to advance the claim to Germany's Lebensraum (living space) at a time when Germany was still more or less disarmed, which forced Hitler to disavow his statements in London. The Foreign Minister Baron von Neurath attempted to contain the damage caused by the "Hugenberg Memorandum" by issuing a press statement that Hugenberg's views were his own, not those of the German government, which led Hugenberg to give an interview with the press in London during which he stated that his views were those of the government and he called Neurath's press release false. In its turn, Hugenberg's interview prompted a further press release from the Foreign Office saying that Hugenberg was not speaking for the government as he claimed he was. After his return to Berlin, at a Cabinet meeting on 23 June, Hugenberg insisted on having a confrontation with Neurath over his press releases that greatly alienated the other non-Nazi members of the cabinet such as Vice-Chancellor Von Papen, finance minister Von Krosigk and Reichsbank president Schacht who all sided with Neurath. By pursuing his dispute with Neurath instead of dropping the issue as the non-Nazi ministers had urged him to do, Hugenberg had lost his last allies against the Nazi assault on the DNF.

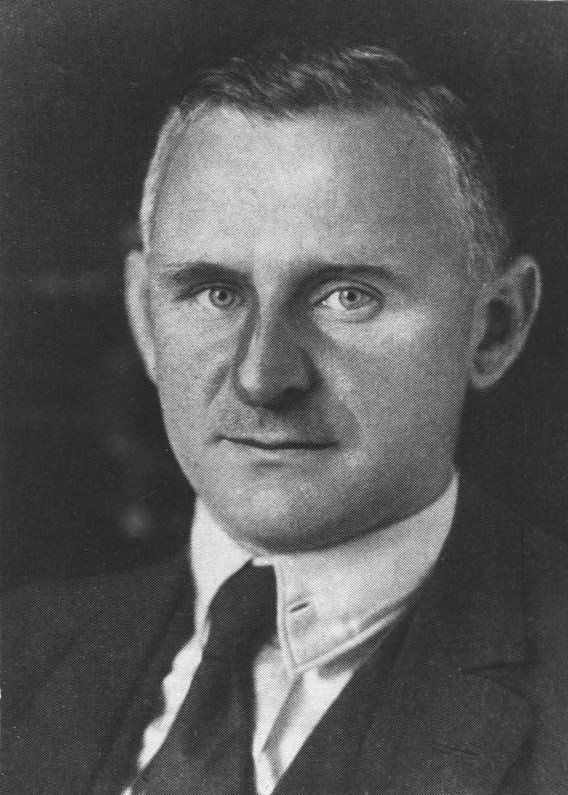
Carl Goerdeler, a leading figure in the DNVP until 1931, would have served as Chancellor if the 20 July plot of 1944 had succeeded.

Shortly thereafter, DNF members were either intimidated into joining the NSDAP or retiring from political life altogether. On 21 June, the police and the SA raided and shut down the DNF's youth wing offices under the grounds that they had been infiltrated by Communists. This led to furious, but futile protests by youth wing's director Admiral Adolf von Trotha asking for help from President Hindenburg while declaring his loyalty to the "national revolution" and the new regime. Unknown to Hugenberg and acting on the initiative of the party executive, Baron Axel von Freytagh-Loringhoven had opened talks with the Interior Minister Wilhelm Frick in late June 1933 on what terms the DNF might best dissolve itself. On 27 June 1933 Hugenberg resigned from the government under the grounds he did not have any power and that attacks by the National Socialists on his party had made his position untenable. Under growing Nazi pressure the party dissolved itself in June 1933, and a month later the Nazi Party was declared to be the only legally permitted party in Germany. One of DNF's conditions for dissolving itself was the promise that all DNF members in the Reichstag, the civil service, and the police be allowed to continue with their jobs and that the rest of the DNF membership be left in peace, a promise that Hitler put into writing. The German historian Hermann Beck wrote that promise was one that Hitler "...kept with astonishing reliability". The National Socialist newspaper Völkischer Beobachter in an editorial on the demise of the DNF on 30 June praised Hugenberg as a fighter against the Young Plan, and called him a "tragic personality". Some of its now-former members, such as Franz Gürtner and Franz Seldte, stayed in the Hitler cabinet for years afterward and eventually joined the Nazi Party. Others, including Hugenberg, remained in the Reichstag as "guests" of the Nazis. Several prominent Nazis such as Hans Lammers, Friedrich Jeckeln, Erwin Bumke, Julius Lippert, Dietrich Klagges, Paul Giesler, Richard Kunze, Kurt Blome, Herbert von Dirksen, Ludwig Münchmeyer, Erich Neumann, Friedrich Hildebrandt, Otto Christian Archibald von Bismarck, Leonardo Conti, Karl von Eberstein, Albert Brackmann, Walter Buch and Wilhelm Kube began their careers in the DNVP, as did the Nazi martyr Horst Wessel.

Several prominent former DNVP members were involved in the 20 July plot against Hitler in 1944. One of the leaders, Carl Friedrich Goerdeler, would have been Chancellor had the plot succeeded. Another, Ulrich von Hassell, was considered to be a potential foreign minister in Goerdeler's government. Other former DNVP members executed after 20 July plot included Ferdinand von Lüninck, Walter Cramer, Ewald von Kleist-Schmenzin, and Paul Lejeune-Jung while Ewald Loeser was imprisoned. Many of the DNVP men who were involved in the 20 July plot had in some way served the Nazi regime in the 1930s with Goerdeler staying on as mayor of Leipzig until 1937 and working as Price Commissioner in 1934–1935, Hassell serving as ambassador to Italy until 1938, and von Lüninck serving as Oberpräsident of Westphalia until 1938 and as an Army officer during the war.

=== Post-war ===
In post-war Germany, no serious attempt was made to recreate the party as a political force when conservative and centrist forces united into bigger parties like the Christian Democratic Union (CDU) and the Christian Social Union (CSU), its Bavarian ally. Former DNVP members in the CDU claimed to have undergone "inner change", but had difficulties being accepted by some of their party colleagues who had belonged to the Catholic Centre Party during the Weimar period. In accounts of its own history and origins, the CDU tended to downplay its DNVP roots, while stressing its continuities from the Centre Party and the small Protestant Christian Social People's Service. Among the most prominent former DNVP members in the CDU were Robert Lehr (federal minister of the interior, 1950–53), Hans Schlange-Schöningen (Reich's minister 1931–32) and Otto Christian Archibald von Bismarck.

A direct ideological successor of the DNVP was the tiny national-conservative and authoritarian-monarchist German Conservative Party – German Right Party (DKP-DRP), including former DNVP members like Reinhold Wulle, Eldor Borck, Wilhelm Jaeger and Otto Schmidt-Hannover, but also attracting former Nazis. Active only in Northern and Northwestern Germany, it won 1.8% of the votes and five seats in the first Bundestag election of 1949. Former DNVP members were also present in the Hanover-based German Party and the short-lived National Democratic Party (NDP) that was only active in Hesse. A federation of the three hard-right parties DKP-DRP, DP and NDP was prohibited by the Allied occupation authorities in 1949, but in 1950 DKP-DRP and NDP merged into the Deutsche Reichspartei (DRP), which enjoyed temporary representation in a few states' parliaments. The DNVP was briefly revived in 1962 as a tiny splinter party, but the new DNVP soon afterwards was merged into the far-right National Democratic Party of Germany (NPD), among whose co-leaders was former DNVP member Heinrich Fassbender.

In his book, The Rise and Fall of the Third Reich, journalist and historian William Shirer wrote that the DNVP's status as a far-right party rather than a mainstream conservative party was one of the main reasons for the Weimar Republic's downfall. In Shirer's view, the DNVP's refusal to "take a responsible position either in the government or in the opposition" during most of Weimar's existence denied Weimar "that stability provided in many other countries by a truly conservative party." Along similar lines, conservative British historian Sir John Wheeler-Bennett wrote about in his book The Nemesis of Power about the DNVP the following:

Had the German Conservatives reconciled themselves to the Republic—bringing to it that wealth of experience and knowledge which they had accumulated in the past, and performing those invaluable services which are always fulfilled in the government of any country by an able constitutional Opposition, ready to take office should the occasion arise—they would have conferred a considerable benefit not only upon Germany—to whom they would have given that which she had so long lacked, a genuine Conservative Party—but also upon the cause of Conservatism throughout the world. They did not do this. Under the cloak of loyalty to the Monarchy, they either held aloof or sabotaged the efforts of successive Chancellors to give a stable government to the Republic. The truth is that after 1918 many German Nationalists were more influenced by feelings of disloyalty to the Republic than of loyalty to the Kaiser, and it was this motive which led them to make their fatal contribution to bringing Hitler to power. The sequel is to be found in the long list of noble names among those executed after the Putsch of July 20, 1944, when many expiated upon the scaffold the sins which they or their fathers had committed a generation earlier.

== Chairmen of the party and chairman of the DNVP in the Reichstag ==
Chairmen of the party:

- 1918–1924: Oskar Hergt (1869–1967)
- 1924–1926: Johann Friedrich Winckler (1856–1943)
- 1926–1928: Kuno Graf von Westarp (1864–1945)
- 1928–1933: Alfred Hugenberg (1865–1951)

Chairmen of the DNVP in the Reichstag:

- 1919–1920: Arthur von Posadowsky-Wehner (1845–1932)
- 1920–1924: Oskar Hergt (1869–1967)
- 1924: Martin Schiele (1870–1939)
- 1924–1929: Kuno Graf von Westarp (1864–1945)
- 1929: Ernst Oberfohren (1881–1933)
- 1929–1933: Otto Schmidt-Hannover (1888–1971)

== Election results ==
Reichstag
Date	Votes			Seats		Position	Size
Date	No.	%	± pp	No.	±	Position	Size
1919	3,121,479	10.27	New	44 / 423	New	Opposition	4th
1920	4,249,100	15.07	▲4.80	71 / 459	▲27	Opposition	▲3rd
May 1924	5,696,475	19.45	▲4.38	95 / 472	▲24	Opposition	▲2nd
December 1924	6,205,802	20.49	▲1.04	103 / 493	▲8	Coalition	2nd
1928	4,381,563	14.25	▼6.24	73 / 491	▼30	Opposition	2nd
1930	2,457,686	7.03	▼7.22	41 / 577	▼32	Opposition	▼5th
July 1932	2,178,024	5.91	▼1.12	37 / 608	▼4	Coalition	5th
November 1932	2,959,053	8.34	▲2.43	51 / 584	▲14	Coalition	5th
March 1933	3,136,760	7.97	▼0.37	52 / 648	▲1	Coalition	5th

== See also ==
- List of German National People's Party politicians
