= Bismarckjugend =

Anti-Marxist youth movement in Weimar Germany

Bismarckjugend Bismarck Youth
- Ideology: Authoritarian conservatism National conservatism Monarchism (German); Völkisch nationalism
- National affiliation: German National People's Party

Bismarckjugend, 'Bismarck Youth', was an anti-Marxist youth movement in Weimar Germany. Bismarckjugend was the youth wing of the monarchist German National People's Party (DNVP).

== History ==
The organization was founded in Hanover in 1922, through the unification of various local youth groups close to the DNVP. The DNVP was the last of the established parties in the Reichstag to have a national youth wing of its own. The organization was politically completely dependent on the DNVP. The youth movement was initially led by Wilhelm Kube. Bismarckjugend branches were at first centred in the industrial areas of Germany. Later the movement spread its wings to the rural eastern regions of the country.

Soon after the founding of the national youth organization (in 1922), Hermann Otto Sieveking became its chairman. Under Sieveking's leadership, the organization developed a paramilitary character. It also began to organize annual national youth meetings.

By mid-1923 Bismarckjugend entered a period of continuous decay. Generally the DNVP was associated with the old order and was unpopular amongst the younger generation.

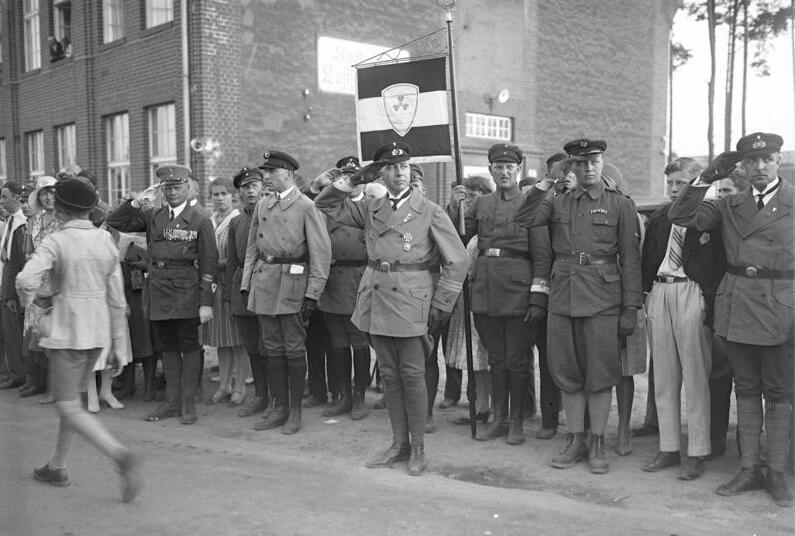
Sieveking and Bismarckjugend activists, 1931

In July 1928 the seventh national youth meeting of Bismarcksjugend has held in Friedrichsruh to commemorate the 30th anniversary of Otto von Bismarck's death. Friedrichsruh is the site of Bismarck's mausoleum. The meeting had particular importance to the mother party, as it was an important event to show strength after the meagre electoral result for the DNVP in May the same year. By the end of the 1920s Bismarckjugend had been revitalized and had expanded its membership.

In the 1933 National Socialist take-over, parties other than the NSDAP either dissolved themselves or were banned. On June 27, 1933 a 'Friendly Agreement' was signed between the DNVP (renamed in 1932 into German National Front (DNF)) and the NSDAP, following which the DNF dissolved itself. In 1935, the wearing of the Bismarckjugend uniform was banned by law.

== Name ==
At the time of the founding of the organization, its name was National League of Youth Groups of the German National People's Party (Reichsverband der Jugendgruppen der Deutschnationalen Volkspartei). In the autumn of 1922 the name Bismarck Youth of the German National People's Party (Bismarckjugend der Deutschnationalen Volkspartei) was adopted, in short Bismarckjugend. The name referred to Otto von Bismarck, and sought to link the organization with Bismarck's historical legacy. Bismarck's grandson Otto gave his permission to the organization to use his grandfather's name.

== Membership ==
Bismarckjugend organized men and women between the ages of 14 and 25. By 1928, the organization had 800 local organizations around Germany. Its total membership had reached 42,000, making it the second largest youth movement in the country at the time (after the SPD Socialist Worker Youth, Sozialistische Arbeiter-Jugend). Generally the movement had a stronger appeal in Protestant areas. Strongholds included Berlin, Magdeburg, Hesse, Thuringia, Lower Saxony, Pomerania, Württemberg and Hamburg.

Most of the members came from bourgeois or noble families. However the single largest affiliate body of the movement, the Bismarck League Berlin, had an overwhelmingly working class membership. As of 1922 the Bismarck League Berlin had around 6,000 affiliates, approximately 80% from working-class families. The Berlin affiliate had been founded in 1920.

== Organ ==
Bismarckjugend published Deutsches Echo ('German Echo').
