= Members of the 4th German Reichstag (Weimar Republic) =

4th Reichstag
←	3rd	5th	→
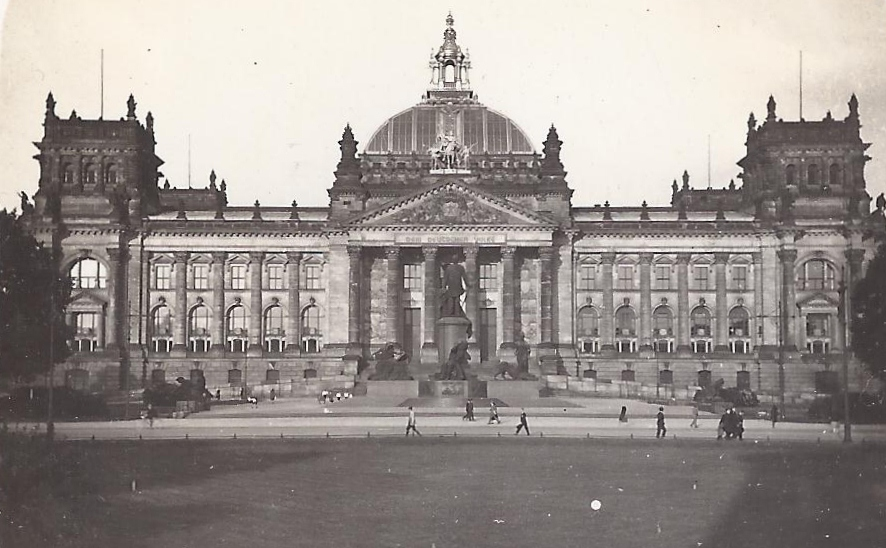
- Reichstag building in 1929

Overview
- Legislative body: Reichstag
- Jurisdiction: Germany
- Meeting place: Reichstag building, Berlin
- Term: 13 June 1928 – 18 July 1930
- Election: 20 May 1928
- Government: Second Müller cabinet First Brüning cabinet

Reichstag
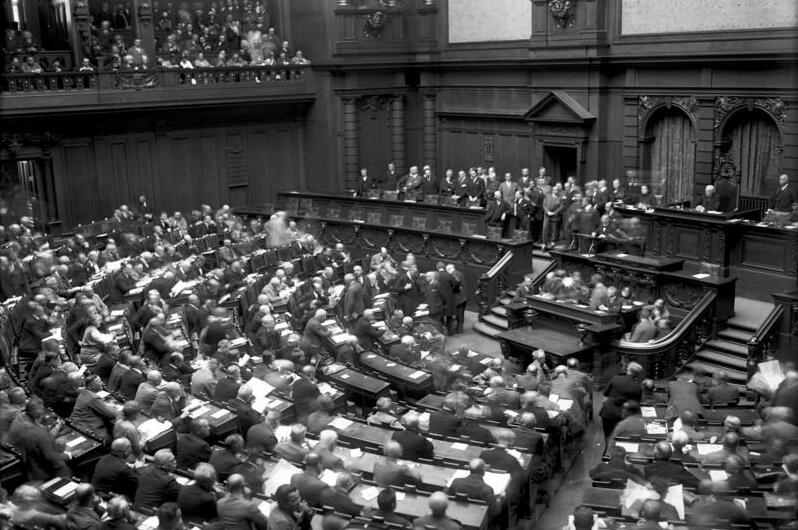
- Members: 491
- President: Paul Löbe (SPD)

This is a list of members of the 4th Reichstag – the parliament of the Weimar Republic, whose members were elected in the 1928 federal election and served in office from 1928 until its dissolution in 1930.

== Presidium ==
Office		Party	Term
President	Paul Löbe	SPD	14 June 1928 – 18 July 1930
Vice President	Thomas Eßer	Centre	14 June 1928 – 18 July 1930
Vice President	Siegfried von Kardorff	DVP	14 June 1928 – 18 July 1930
Vice President	Walther Graef	DNVP	14 June 1928 – 18 July 1930

Wilhelm Bock (SPD) served as Alterspräsident (Father of the House) and presided over the first parliamentary session, until Paul Löbe was elected as President of the Reichstag.

== Social Democratic Party of Germany ==
In German the Sozialdemokratische Partei Deutschlands, SPD.

- Hermann Beims (1863–1931)
- Paul Bader
- Arthur Arzt
- Siegfried Aufhäuser (1884–1969)
- Marie Arning (1887–1957)
- Maria Ansorge (1880–1955)
- Lore Agnes (1876–1953)
- Ferdinand Bender (1870–1939)
- Albert Bergholz entered Reichstag on 25 June 1929 for Krüger (Merseburg)
- Paul Bergmann
- Adolf Biedermann (1881–1933)
- Hans Böckler (1875–1951)
- Clara Bohm-Schuch (1879–1936)
- Heinrich Becker (Herborn) (1877–1964)
- Louis Biester (1882–1965)
- Wilhelm Bock
- Dr. Rudolf Breitscheid (1874–1944)
- August Brey (1864–1937)
- Conrad Broßwitz
- Alwin Brandes (1866–1949
- Otto Braun (Düsseldorf) (1872–1955)
- Otto Buchwitz (1879–1964)
- Albert Bülow
- Arthur Crispien (1875–1946)
- Dr. Eduard David (1863–1930)
- Karoline Dettmer, SPD, entered Reichstag on 17 January 1930 for Schlüter
- Georg Dietrich (Thüringen) (1888-unknown)
- Wilhelm Dittmann (1874–1954)
- Friedrich Ebert (Potsdam) (1894–1979)
- Otto Eggerstedt (1886–1933)
- Albert Falkenberg entered Reichstag on 25 August 1928 on the basis of a corrected result of the Reichstag election in constituency No. 1 (East Prussia)
- Franz Feldmann (1868–1937)
- Gustav Ferl (1890–1970)
- Hermann Fleissner (1865–1939)
- August Frölich (Thüringen) (1877–1966)
- Otto Geiselhart entered Reichstag on 26 February 1929 for Abg. Saenger
- Paul Gerlach
- Emil Girbig
- Georg Graf (1881–1952)
- Peter Graßmann (1873–1939)
- Georg Graupe (Zwickau) (1875–1959) entered Reichstag on 15 February 1930 for Abg. Dr. Levi
- Otto Grotewohl (1894–1964)
- Ernst Heilmann (Frankfurt) (1881–1940)
- Hugo Heimann (Berlin) (1859–1951)
- Kurt Heinig (1886–1956)
- Alfred Henke
- Karl Hermann (1885–1973) left Reichstag on 12 May 1930
- Dr. Paul Hertz (1888–1961)
- Karl Hildenbrand (Württemberg) (1864–1935)
- Dr. Rudolf Hilferding (1877–1941)
- Johannes Hoffmann (Kaiserslautern) (1867–1930)
- Oskar Hünlich (1887–1963)
- Friedrich Ernst Husemann (1873–1935)
- Carl Jäcker
- Gerhard Jacobshagen
- Alfred Janschek (1874–1955)
- Marie Juchacz (1879–1956)
- Paul Junke
- August Karsten (1888-??)
- Wilhelm Keil (1870–1968)
- Franz Kotzke
- Hermann Krätzig (1871–1954)
- Wilhelm Kröger (Rostock)
- Richard Krüger (Merseburg) left Reichstag on 22 June 1929
- Bernhard Kuhnt (1876–1946)
- Marie Kunert
- Franz Künstler (1888–1942)
- Nanny Kurfürst, SPD
- Otto Landsberg (1869–1957)
- Dr. Julius Leber (1891–1945)
- Dr. Paul Levi (1883–1930) died on 9 February 1930
- Heinrich Wilhelm Limbertz
- Richard Lipinski (1867–1936)
- Carl Litke (1897–1962)
- Paul Löbe (1875–1967)
- Dr. Kurt Löwenstein (1895–1939)
- Josef Lübbring
- Konrad Ludwig
- Werner Lufft
- Karl Mache
- Ludwig Marum (1882–1934)
- Stefan Meier (Baden)
- Arthur Mertins (1898–1979) entered Reichstag on 28 August 1929 for Abg. Schulz (Königsberg)
- Franz Metz
- Oscar Meyer (Berlin)
- Dr. Julius Moses (1868–1942)
- Hermann Müller (Franken) (1876–1931)
- Anna Nemitz (1873–1962)
- Friedrich Nowack (1890–1959)
- Antonie Pfülf (1877–1933)
- Otto Friedrich Passehl (Pommern),
- Friedrich Peine
- Franz Peters (1888-??)
- Heinrich Peus
- Friedrich Puchta (1883–1945)
- Dr. Ludwig Quessel
- Johanna Reitze (1878–1949)
- Adam Remmele (Baden) (1877–1951)
- Heinrich Richter (Hildesheim)
- Max Richter (Schleswig-Holstein)
- Dr. Kurt Rosenfeld (1877–1943)
- Erich Roßmann (Württemberg) (1884–1953)
- Alwin Saenger died on 18 February 1929
- Hugo Saupe (Leipzig) (1883-??)
- Joseph Schaffner
- Franz Scheffel
- Philipp Scheidemann (1865–1939)
- Luise Schiffgens
- Richard Schiller
- Johannes Schirmer (Dresden)
- Alexander Schlicke (1863–1940)
- Wilhelm Schlüter died am 8 January 1930
- Robert Schmidt (Berlin) (1864–1943)
- Georg Schmidt (Cöpenick) (1875–1946)
- Richard Schmidt (Meißen) (1871–1945)
- Georg Schöpflin
- Carl Schreck (Bielefeld) (1873–1956)
- Adele Schreiber-Krieger
- Louise Schroeder (Schleswig-Holstein) (1887–1957)
- Hermann Schulz (Königsberg) died on 20 August 1929
- Berta Schulz (Westfalen)
- Oswald Schumann (Frankfurt)
- Gustav Schumann (Stettin)
- Hans Seidel
- Tony Sender (1888–1964)
- Max Seppel
- Carl Severing (1875–1952)
- Max Seydewitz (1892–1987)
- Dr. Anna Siemsen (1882–1951)
- Dr. August Siemsen (Thüringen) (1884–1958) entered Reichstag on 17 May 1930 for Abg. Hermann
- Josef Simon (Franken)
- Georg Simon (Schwaben)
- Wilhelm Sollmann (1881–1951)
- Heinrich Schulz (Bremen) (1872–1932)
- Karl Spiegel
- Wilhelm Staab
- Friedrich Stampfer (1874–1957)
- Dr. Anna Stegmann
- Willy Steinkopf (1885–1953)
- Johannes Stelling (1877–1933)
- Heinrich Ströbel (1869–1944)
- Daniel Stücklen (1869–1945)
- Fritz Tarnow (1880–1951)
- Paul Taubadel (1875–1937)
- Hermann Tempel
- Johannes Thabor
- Carl Ulrich (Hessen) (1853–1933)
- Hans Unterleitner (1890–1971)
- Johann Vogel (1881–1945)
- Klara Weich
- Otto Wels (1872–1939)
- Carl Wendemuth
- Georg Wendt
- Rudolf Wissell (1869–1962)
- Otto Witte
- Mathilde Wurm (1874–1935)
- Hermann Müller (Lichtenberg) (1868–1932)
- Michael Schnabrich (1880–1939)

== German National People's Party ==
In German Deutschnationale Volkspartei, DNVP.

- Dr. Dirk Agena
- Dr. Paul Bang
- Gustav von Bartenwerffer, DNVP, entered Reichstag 4 April 1930 for Abg. Schiele
- Georg Bachmann, DNVP
- Wilhelm Bazille (1874–1934), DNVP
- Emil Berndt, DNVP
- Franz Biener (1866–1940), DNVP
- Wilhelm Bruhn (1869–1951), DNVP, left the party October 1929 and became an independent member
- Wilhelm Dingler, DNVP
- Alwin Domsch (Dresden), DNVP
- Dr. Gottfried von Dryander, DNVP
- Botho-Wendt Graf zu Eulenburg, DNVP
- Dr. Friedrich Everling, DNVP
- Dr. Axel Freiherr von Freytagh-Loringhoven, DNVP
- Curt Wilhelm Fromm, DNVP
- Heinrich Gerns (1892–1963), DNVP
- Georg Gottheiner, DNVP
- Walther Graef (Thüringen), DNVP
- Carl Gottfried Gok, DNVP
- Hans von Goldacker, DNVP
- Heinrich Haag, DNVP
- Robert Hampe, DNVP
- Dr. Alfred Hanemann, DNVP
- Georg Hartmann, DNVP
- Dr. Johann Jacob Haßlacher, DNVP
- Oskar Hergt (1869–1967), DNVP
- Dr. Alfred Hugenberg (1865–1951), DNVP
- Emil Hemeter, DNVP
- Willy Jandrey (1877–1945), DNVP
- Dr. Fritz Kleiner, DNVP, entered Reichstag 2 December 1929 for Abg. Wolf (Oppeln)
- Wilhelm Koch (Düsseldorf), DNVP
- Dr. Albrecht Philipp (1883–1962), DNVP
- Dr. Dr. Dietrich Preyer, DNVP
- Wilhelm Vogt (Württemberg), DNVP
- Max Wallraf, DNVP
- Kurt Wege, DNVP
- Kuno Graf von Westarp (1864–1945)
- Dr. Erich Wienbeck
- Edgar Wolf (Oppeln) resigned 30 November 1929
- Johannes Wolf (Stettin)
- Dr. Ernst Oberfohren (1881–1933), DNVP - party chairman from 12 December 1929
- Wilhelm Ohler
- Dr. Reinhold Quaatz
- Hans von Troilo
- Dr. Walther Rademacher
- Dr. Jakob Reichert
- Praetorius Freiherr von Richthofen
- Carl Rieseberg
- Hans Sachs (1874–1947), National Liberal Land Party, Guest of the DNVP
- Walter Stubbendorff
- D. Hermann Strathmann
- Martin Schiele (1870–1939), DNVP, resigned 31 March 1930
- Dr. Karl Steiniger
- Hermann Staffehl (Potsdam)
- Otto Schmidt (Hannover) (1888–1971)
- Otto Schmidt (Stettin)
- Hermann Schröter (Liegnitz)
- Georg Schultz (Bromberg) (1860–1945)
- Max Soth
- Dr. Martin Spahn (1875–1945)
- Ernst Mentzel
- Paula Müller-Otfried (1865–1946)
- Wilhelm Laverrenz (1879–1955)
- Annagrete Lehmann
- Bernhard Leopold
- Paul von Lettow-Vorbeck (1870–1964)
- Heinrich Lind later independent

=== Later formed CNAG ===
These DNVP members later merged with CNBL to form the Christian National Labor Society (Christlich-Nationale Arbeitsgemeinschaft, CNAG).

- Emil Hartwig (Berlin)
- Dr. Otto Hoetzsch (1876–1946)
- Gottfried Treviranus (1891–1971)
- Franz Behrens (1872–1943)
- Gustav Hülser
- Wilhelm Mönke
- D. Reinhard Mumm (1873–1932)
- Walter von Keudell (1884–1973)
- Moritz Klönne
- Walther Lambach
- Dr. Paul Lejeune-Jung (1882–1944)
- Hans Erdmann von Lindeiner-Wildau
- Hans Schlange (1886–1960)

== Centre Party (Germany) ==
In German Zentrum.

- Josef Andre left Reichstag on 31 October 1928
- Adalbert Beck (Oppeln)
- Johannes Becker (Arnsberg) (1875–1955)
- Dr. Johannes Bell (1868–1949)
- Franz Bielefeld
- Johannes Blum (Krefeld) (1857–1946)
- Dr. Fritz Bockius
- Eugen Bolz (1881–1945)
- Franz Bornefeld-Ettmann
- Dr. Heinrich Brauns (Köln) (1868–1939)
- Dr. Heinrich Brüning (1885–1970)
- Dr. August Crone-Münzebrock
- Anton Damm
- Dr. Friedrich Dessauer (1881–1963)
- Carl Diez (1877–1969)
- Dr. Johannes Drees
- Franz Ehrhardt (1880–1956)
- Joseph Ersing (1882–1956)
- Thomas Esser
- Heinrich Fahrenbach
- Franz Feilmayr
- Dr. Ernst Föhr (Baden)
- Hedwig Fuchs entered Reichstag on 8 March 1929 for Lammers
- Otto Gerig
- Johannes Giesberts (1865–1938)
- Johannes Groß entered Reichstag on 7 November 1928 for Andre
- Theodor von Guérard (1863–1943)
- Heinrich Hartwig (Oppeln)
- Dr. Andreas Hermes (1878–1964)
- Carl Herold
- Hermann Hofmann (Ludwigshafen)
- Heinrich Imbusch (1878–1945)
- Josef Joos (1878–1965)
- Dr. Ludwig Kaas (Trier) (1881–1952)
- Peter Kerp
- Florian Klöckner
- Dr. Heinrich Köhler (1878–1949)
- Clemens Lammers left Reichstag on 1 March 1929
- Wilhelm Marx (1863–1946)
- Georg Nauheim
- Agnes Neuhaus (1854–1944)
- Hugo Neumann
- Matthias Neyses
- Hans Nientimp later independent
- Dr. Ludwig Perlitius
- Franz Riesener
- Adam Stegerwald (1874–1945)
- Richard Schönborn
- Paul Schulz-Gahmen
- D. Dr. Georg Schreiber (1882–1963)
- Josef Sinn resigned 11 April 1929
- Jean-Albert Schwarz (Frankfurt) (1873–1957)
- Dr. Rudolf Schetter (Köln) entered Reichstag on 18 April 1929 for Sinn
- Peter Schlack (1875–1957)
- Christine Teusch (1888–1968)
- Peter Tremmel
- Karl Ulitzka
- Brunislaus Warnke
- Helene Weber (1881–1962)
- August Wegmann August Wegmann (1888–1976)
- Franz Wieber (1858–1933)
- Heinrich Wilkens (Liegnitz)
- Dr. Joseph Wirth (1879–1956)
- Dr. Heinrich Krone (1895–1989)

== Communist Party of Germany ==
- Martha Arendsee (1885–1953)
- Dr. Eduard Alexander (1881–1945)
- Julius Adler (1894–1945)
- Paul Bertz (1886–1950)
- Theodor Beutling (1898-vermutl. 1937)
- Conrad Blenkle (1901–1943)
- Albert Buchmann (1894–1975)
- Franz Dahlem (1892–1981)
- Jakob Dautzenberg (1897–1979)
- Philipp Dengel (1888–1948)
- Paul Dietrich (Berlin) (1889- vermutl. 1937))
- Adolf Ende (1899–1951)
- Arthur Ewert (Thüringen) (1890–1959)
- Wilhelm Florin (1894–1944)
- Paul Frölich (Leipzig) (1884–1953) until the end of 1928 (KPO)
- Ottomar Geschke (1882–1957),
- Hugo Gräf (Dresden) (1892–1958),
- Friedrich Heckert (1884–1936)
- Wilhelm Hein (1889–1958)
- Emil Höllein (1880–1929) died on 18 August 1929
- Edwin Hoernle (1883–1952)
- Anton Jadasch (1888–1964)
- Georg Kaßler (1887–1962)
- Willy Leow (1887–1937)
- Max Maddalena (1895–1943)
- Peter Maslowski (1893-?)
- Johann Meyer (Franken) (1889–1950)
- Josef Miller (Hannover) (1883–1964)
- Wilhelm Münzenberg (1889–1940)
- Dr. Theodor Neubauer (Berlin) (1890–1945)
- Helene Overlach (1894-1983)
- Paul Papke
- Nikolaus Pfaff, KPD, entered Reichstag on 24 August 1929 for Höllein
- Hans Pfeiffer (1895–1968)
- Wilhelm Pieck (1876–1960)
- Ernst Putz (1896–1933
- Siegfried Rädel (1893–1943)
- Paul Redlich
- Maria Reese (1889–1958), SPD, in November 1929 alternate of the KPD
- Hermann Remmele (Berlin) (1880–1939)
- Wilhelm Repschläger (1870–1945), KPD
- Heinrich Schmitt (Merseburg) (1895–1951)
- Ernst Schneller (1890–1944)
- Paul Schreck (Baden) (1892–1948)
- Walter Stoecker (1891–1931), KPD, floor leader from 1929
- Max Strötzel (1885–1945)
- Ernst Thälmann (1886–1944)
- Matthias Thesen (1891–1944)
- Ernst Torgler (1893–1963), KPD - floor leader to 1929
- Walter Ulbricht (Westfalen) (1893–1973)
- Artur Vogt (Westfalen) (1894–1964)
- Clara Zetkin (1857–1933)
- Hans Kippenberger (1898–1937)
- Hans Kollwitz (1893–1948)
- Wilhelm Koenen (1886–1963)

== German People's Party ==
- Helmuth Albrecht
- Dr. Michael Bayersdörfer, BVP
- Johann Becker (Hessen) (1869–1951)
- Heinrich Beythien
- Theodor Bickes
- Franz Brüninghaus
- Friedrich Cramm
- Dr. Carl Cremer
- Dr. Julius Curtius (1877–1948)
- Walther Dauch (Hamburg)
- Eduard Dingeldey (1886–1942)
- Adolf Findeisen
- Erich von Gilsa
- Christian Günther
- Heinrich Janson
- Dr. Friedrich Pfeffer
- Dr. Albert Zapf
- Dr. Johannes Wunderlich left Reichstag on 31 March 1930
- August Winnefeld
- Otto Thiel
- Dr. Heinrich Runkel
- Werner Freiherr von Rheinbaben
- Dr. Johannes Rammelt, DVP, entered Reichstag on 3 October 1929 for Dr. Kulenkampff
- Hans von Raumer (1870–1965)
- Ernst Hamkens
- Heinrich Havemann, DVP, entered Reichstag on 12 October 1929 for Dr. Stresemann
- Dr. Doris Hertwig-Bünger
- Ernst Hintzmann
- Dr. Curt Hoff
- Adolf Hueck
- Dr. Otto Hugo (1878–1942)
- Dr. Elsa Matz
- Dr. Fritz Mittelmann (1886–1932)
- Dr. Paul Moldenhauer
- Albrecht Morath
- D. Dr. Wilhelm Kahl (1849–1932)
- Dr. Wilhelm Kalle
- Siegfried von Kardorff
- Otto Keinath entered Reichstag on 2 April 1930 for Dr. Wunderlich
- Adolf Kempkes
- Dr. Walther Kulenkampff died on 29 September 1929
- Eugen Köngeter
- Richard Leutheußer (1867–1945)
- Albrecht Graf zu Stolberg-Wernigerode (1886–1948)
- Dr. Gustav Stresemann (1878–1929) died 3 October 1929
- Dr. Heinrich Schnee (1871–1949)
- Dr. Rudolph Schneider (Dresden)
- Dr. Ernst Scholz
- Carl Schmid (Düsseldorf)

== German Democratic Party ==
- Dr. Gertrud Bäumer (1873–1954)
- Franz Bartschat entered Reichstag on 10 March 1930 for Dr. Hellpach
- Georg Bernhard
- Johannes Büll
- Dr. Bernhard Dernburg (1865–1937)
- Hermann Dietrich (Baden) (1879–1954)
- Gustav Ehlermann
- Anton Erkelenz (1878–1945)
- Otto Fischbeck (1865–1939)
- Dr. Hermann Fischer (Köln) (1873–1940)
- Paul Ziegler
- Dr. Philipp Wieland
- Theodor Tantzen left Reichstag 4 May 1930
- Dr. Emilie Kiep-Altenloh (1888–1985) entered Reichstag on 9 May 1930 for Herr Tantzen
- Erich Koch-Weser (1875–1944)
- Dr. Wilhelm Külz (1875–1948)
- Heinrich Rönneburg
- Dr. Peter Reinhold
- Dr. Ludwig Haas (Baden) died 2 August 1930
- Dr. Willy Hellpach, (1877–1955) left Reichstag 6 March 1930
- Dr. Hermann Hummel (1876–1952)
- Ernst Lemmer (1898–1970)
- Marie Elisabeth Lüders (1878–1966)
- Georg Sparrer
- Otto Schuldt (Steglitz)
- Gustav Schneider (Berlin)

== Reich Party of the German Middle Class ==
In German the Reichspartei des deutschen Mittelstandes.

- Oskar Beier (Dresden)
- Fritz Borrmann
- Dr. Dr. Johann Viktor Bredt (1879–1940)
- Otto Colosser
- Hermann Drewitz
- Johannes Dunkel
- Wilhelm François
- Franz Freidel
- Carl Freybe
- Dr. Franz Jörissen
- Karl Pallmann
- Artur Petzold
- Franz Holzamer
- Heinrich Hömberg
- Hans Hetzel
- Jacob Ludwig Mollath
- Emil Köster
- Carl Lauterbach
- Ernst Lucke
- Wilhelm Lünenschloß died on 10 July 1929
- Gotthard Sachsenberg
- Otto Strauß
- Wilhelm Siegfried
- Robert Schulte (Westfalen) appointed to Reichstag on 22 July 1929 for Herr Lünenschloß

== Bavarian People's Party ==
- Alois Albert
- Franz Dauer (Niederbayern)
- Sebastian Diernreiter
- Erich Emminger (1880–1951)
- Franz Gerauer
- Dr. Joseph Pfleger
- Hans Rauch (München)
- Karl Troßmann (Nürnberg)
- Franz Herbert
- Dr. Michael Horlacher (München) (1888–1957)
- Franz Xaver Lang
- Thusnelda Lang-Brumann
- Johann Leicht
- Martin Loibl
- Rudolf Schwarzer (Oberbayern)
- Franz Schmitt (Franken)

== National Socialist German Workers' Party ==
- Walter Buch (1883–1949)
- Wilhelm Dreher (1892–1969)
- Franz Ritter von Epp (1868–1946)
- Gottfried Feder (Sachsen) (1883–1941)
- Dr. Wilhelm Frick (1877–1946)
- Dr. Joseph Goebbels (1897–1945)
- Hermann Göring (1893–1946)
- Ernst Graf zu Reventlow (1869–1943)
- Franz Stöhr (1879–1938)
- Gregor Straßer (1892–1934)
- Josef Wagner (1899–1945)
- Werner Willikens (Hannover) (1893–1961)

== Christian National Farmers and Countryfolk Party ==
In German the Christlich-Nationale Bauern- und Landvolkpartei, CNDL. This party later merged with dissident DNVP members to form the Christian National Labor Society (Christlich-Nationale Arbeitsgemeinschaft, CNAG)

- Franz Bauer (Sachsen)
- Friedrich Döbrich
- Wilhelm Dorsch (Hessen)
- Hermann Julier
- Dr. Albrecht Wendhausen
- Willi Neddenriep
- Franz Hänse
- Karl Hepp, (1889–1970)
- Heinrich von Sybel

== German Farmers' Party ==
- Hans Eder (Niederbayern)
- Georg Eisenberger (1863–1945)
- Anton Fehr (München) (1881–1954)
- Carl Gandorfer
- Franz Haindl
- August Hillebrand (Schlesien)
- Andreas Kerschbaum
- Fritz Kling

== German-Hanoverian Party ==
- August Arteldt
- Ludwig Alpers (1866–1959)
- Adolf Freiherr von Hammerstein-Loxten
- Heinrich Meyer (Hannover)

== Reich Party for Civil Rights and Deflation ==
In German the Reichspartei für Volksrecht und Aufwertung

- Dr. Georg Best
- Emil Herberg (Zwickau) came in for Dr. Lobe 3 January 1930
- Dr. Adolf Lobe left Reichstag 31 December 1929
