= 1928 Prussian state election =

- 20 May 1928
- All 450 seats in the Landtag of Prussia; 226 seats needed for a majority
- Turnout: 76.4% (▼2.2pp)
Party	Vote %	Seats	+/–
Social Democratic Party	29.0%	137	+23
German National People's Party	17.4%	82	−27
Centre Party	14.5%	68	−13
Communist Party	11.9%	56	+12
German People's Party	8.5%	40	−5
Economic Party	4.5%	21	+10
German Democratic Party	4.5%	21	−6
Christian-National Farmers' Party	2.5%	12	+6
Nazi Party	1.8%	6	−5
People's Justice Party	1.3%	2	New
Völkisch National Bloc	1.1%	2	New
Centre Party (Lower Saxony)	0.7%	3	New
This lists parties that won seats. See the complete results below.
Results by electoral constituency
Government before	Government after
Third Braun cabinet SPD–Z–DDP	Third Braun cabinet SPD–Z–DDP

State elections were held in the Free State of Prussia on 20 May 1928 to elect all 450 members of the Landtag of Prussia. The governing coalition of the Social Democratic Party, Centre Party, and German Democratic Party retained its majority. The SPD recorded its best result since 1919 while the opposition German National People's Party suffered significant losses. The Centre Party, German People's Party, and DDP took modest losses; the Communist Party and Economic Party made modest gains.

== Results ==
Party	Votes	%	Swing	Seats	+/–
Social Democratic Party (SPD)	5,464,767	29.00	+4.11	137	+23
German National People's Party (DNVP)	3,274,897	17.38	–6.32	82	–27
Centre Party (Zentrum)	2,737,859	14.53	–3.04	68	–13
Communist Party of Germany (KPD)	2,237,160	11.87	+2.25	56	+12
German People's Party (DVP)	1,602,070	8.50	–1.28	40	–5
Reich Party of the German Middle Class (WP); Reich Party of the German Middle Class (WP); Pastor Greber Party	850,391; 840,661; 9,730	4.51; 4.46; 0.05	+2.04 +2.06; New	21; 21; 0	+10 +10; New
German Democratic Party (DDP); German Democratic Party (DDP); People's Justice Party (Reich Party for Civil Rights and Deflation)	839,530; 829,859; 9,671	4.46; 4.40; 0.05	–1.44 –1.50; New	21; 21; 0	–6 –6; New
Christian-National Peasants' and Farmers' Party (CNBL); Christian-National Peasants' and Farmers' Party (CNBL); German-Hanoverian Party (DHP)	463,929; 276,788; 187,141	2.46; 1.47; 0.99	+1.05; New –0.42	12; 8; 4	+6; New –2
National Socialist German Workers Party (NSDAP)	346,771	1.84	–0.63	6	–5
People's Justice Party (VRP)	235,750	1.25	New	2	New
Völkisch National Bloc (VNB)	205,789	1.09	New	2	New
Centre Party of Lower Saxony	132,424	0.70	New	3	New
German Farmers' Party (DBP)	88,534	0.47	New	0	New
National Minorities of Germany (NMD); Poland Party; Schleswiger Association; Lithuanian People's Party; Wendish People's Party; Masurian People's Party "Friesland"	75,717; 71,757; 2,466; 432; 382; 369; 311	0.40; 0.38; 0.01; 0.00; 0.00; 0.00; 0.00	–0.08 –0.06 –0.02; New; 0.00; 0.00; New	0; 0; 0; 0; 0; 0; 0	–2 –2; 0 New; 0; 0 New
Christian Social Reichs Party	72,734	0.39	New	0	New
Left Communists	55,509	0.29	New	0	New
German Social Party	38,633	0.21	New	0	New
People's Bloc of Inflation Victims; People's Bloc of Inflation Victims; German Revaluation and Reconstruction Party (Cultural and Justice State Party etc.)	24,218; 22,812; 1,406	0.13; 0.12; 0.01	–0.09; New –0.21	0; 0; 0	0 New; 0
Old Social Democratic Party of Germany (ASPD)	18,852	0.10	New	0	New
Protestant National Community	15,978	0.08	New	0	New
Independent Social Democratic Party (USPD)	12,129	0.06	–0.31	0	0
German Home and Landowners' Party	11,600	0.06	New	0	New
Protestant People's Service	10,290	0.05	New	0	New
Reichs Party for Craft, Commerce and Trade	6,173	0.03	New	0	New
Non-Political List of War Victims etc.	5,960	0.03	New	0	New
German Reichs Bloc of the Injured	5,797	0.03	New	0	New
Christian National Middle-Class Party	4,793	0.03	New	0	New
Party for Justice and Tenant Protection	2,375	0.01	New	0	New
Revaluation and Reconstruction Party	1,022	0.01	–0.06	0	0
People's Justice Party (Reich Party for Civil Rights and Deflation)	872	0.00	New	0	New
Invalid/blank votes	370,531	1.93	–	–	–
Total	18,842,523	100	–	450	0
Registered voters/turnout	25,152,711	76.39	–2.19	–	–
Gonschior.de

Popular Vote
SPD	29.00%
DNVP	17.38%
Zentrum	14.53%
KPD	11.87%
DVP	8.50%
WP	4.51%
DDP	4.46%
CNBL	2.46%
NSDAP	1.84%
VRP	1.25%
VNB	1.09%
ZNS	0.70%
Other	2.41%

Landtag seats
SPD	30.44%
DNVP	18.22%
Zentrum	15.11%
KPD	12.44%
DVP	8.89%
WP	4.67%
DDP	4.67%
CNBL	1.78%
NSDAP	1.33%
DHP	0.89%
ZNS	0.67%
VRP	0.44%
VNB	0.44%

=== Results by constituency ===
Constituency	SPD	DNVP	Z	KPD	DVP	WP	DDP	CNBL	NSDAP	Other
1. East Prussia	26.8	31.3	7.4	9.5	9.8	2.1	3.8	–	0.8	8.5
2. Berlin	34.0	15.7	3.4	29.6	4.2	2.4	6.5	–	1.4	2.8
3. Potsdam II	30.6	21.5	3.1	17.5	9.1	3.2	9.5	–	1.7	3.8
4. Potsdam I	34.7	22.9	2.2	17.1	6.5	5.1	5.2	0.2	1.6	4.5
5. Frankfurt an der Oder	33.1	29.4	6.1	6.0	8.4	3.9	4.4	2.3	1.0	5.4
6. Pomerania	30.2	41.5	1.0	6.1	5.5	5.0	4.0	0.3	1.5	4.9
7. Breslau	37.8	22.9	15.8	4.5	6.0	3.7	3.0	0.4	0.9	5.0
8. Liegnitz	37.8	24.4	7.9	4.2	6.5	7.1	6.4	0.1	1.2	4.4
9. Oppeln	12.5	16.9	39.9	12.7	2.7	1.3	1.6	1.1	1.0	10.3
10. Magdeburg	43.0	16.8	1.8	7.2	12.7	5.1	5.3	0.3	1.6	6.2
11. Merseburg	23.8	21.4	1.4	24.6	10.2	6.0	4.6	0.3	2.7	5.0
12. Erfurt	28.8	15.8	12.9	11.2	11.3	7.7	4.1	0.8	3.5	3.9
13. Schleswig-Holstein	35.2	22.8	1.1	8.0	13.9	5.5	5.6	0.3	4.0	3.6
14. Weser-Ems	22.8	9.5	24.5	3.5	10.4	2.8	4.5	8.8 (Note: Including results for both the CNBL and DHP, which ran on separate but affiliated lists.)	5.1	8.1
15. Hanover East	32.7	10.5	1.3	5.8	10.5	4.0	3.6	25.4	2.6	3.6
16. Hanover South	44.0	9.0	5.5	3.5	11.9	3.6	3.9	12.5	3.4	2.7
17. Westphalia North	22.8	8.4	34.5	9.4	7.6	6.0	2.2	3.4	0.9	4.8
18. Westphalia South	29.5	8.6	23.3	11.9	10.6	4.7	4.2	1.3	1.6	4.3
19. Hesse-Nassau	32.4	10.0	15.1	8.1	9.9	4.2	5.7	7.2	3.6	3.8
20. Köln-Aachen	18.5	7.3	42.0	10.4	8.4	4.4	3.2	–	1.1	4.7
21. Koblenz-Trier	11.8	6.7	52.1	4.7	5.8	4.2	1.9	5.8	2.0	5.0
22. Düsseldorf East	19.0	11.9	21.0	22.5	8.9	6.1	3.2	–	1.8	5.6
23. Düsseldorf West	17.2	10.7	35.6	14.7	8.4	6.0	2.5	0.2	1.2	3.5

== See also ==
- Elections in the Free State of Prussia
- Weimar Republic
