= 1932 German federal election =

The 1932 German federal election may refer to:

- July 1932 German federal election
- November 1932 German federal election
