= Karl Hepp =

German politician (1889–1970)

- Hepp in 1924

President of the Reichs-Landbund
- In office 1921 – 1 August 1928
- Serving with: Gustav Roesicke (1921–1925); Count Eberhard von Kalckreuth (1925–1928)
- Preceded by: Position established
- Succeeded by: Martin Schiele

Vice President of the Reichs-Landbund
- In office 1 August 1928 – 1930
- President: Martin Schiele
- Serving with: Albrecht Bethge
- Preceded by: Position established
- Succeeded by: Heinrich Lind

Member of the Reichstag
- In office 6 June 1920 – 31 July 1932

President of the Chamber of Agriculture for Wetzlar
- In office 1928–1933

Leader of the District Farmers' Association for Nassau and the Wetzlar District
- In office 1918–1933
- Preceded by: Position established

Personal details
- Born: 10 February 1889 Seelbach, Kingdom of Prussia, German Empire
- Died: 3 January 1970 (aged 80) Wiesbaden, Hesse, Federal Republic of Germany
- Party: German People's Party (DVP) (1920–1928); National Liberal Association of the German People's Party (NLV) (1924); Christian-National Peasants' and Farmers' Party (CNBLP) (1928–1933); National Socialist German Workers' Party (NSDAP) (1937–1945); Free Democratic Party (FDP) (1953–1956); Free People's Party (FVP) (1956–1957); German Party (DP) (1957)
- Other political affiliations: Reichs-Landbund (RLB) (1921–1930)
- Parent: Hermann Hepp [de] (father)
- Occupation: Politician; Farmer; Soldier

Military service
- Allegiance: German Empire
- Branch/service: Imperial German Army
- Battles/wars: World War I
- Awards: Iron Cross, 1st Class

Karl Hepp (10 February 1889 – 3 January 1970) was a German agrarian politician, official, advocate, and farmer during the Weimar Republic and the post-WW2 Federal Republic of Germany. Outside of leading multiple influential agrarian political parties — the Reichs-Landbund (Agricultural League) and the Christian-National Peasants' and Farmers' Party (CNBLP) — Hepp served as a deputy representing numerous liberal and nationalist parties and organisations.

== Biography ==
=== Early life ===
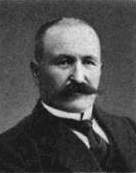
Hermann Hepp in 1912

Hepp was born on 10 February 1889, in the municipality of Seelbach, at that time a part of the Province of Hesse-Nassau in the constituent-kingdom of Prussia of the German Empire. Hepp is the son of Hermann Hepp [de], a local politician and the mayor of Seelbach, and Elise Hofmann, who were protestant. He attended elementary school in Seelbach, before receiving a humanistic secondary education at Weilburg. He studied law at the Ludwig-Maximilians-Universität München, and agricultural science at the University of Bonn. Following his education, Hepp participated in the Lower Franconian and Saxon agriculture sectors. In 1914, World War I commenced; Hepp served on the side of Germany and the Central Powers, being rewarded with the Iron Cross (1st Class). In 1918, facing collapse, Germany and the Central Powers capitulated; Germany's monarchical government was toppled, replaced with a liberal-democratic Republic.

=== Post-war ===
In 1918, following the First World War, Hepp founded and led the farmers' association for the Wetzlar district, including Nassau and the surrounding areas. Hepp was toppled from his position in 1933, following the Nazi takeover of Germany and their establishment of a totalitarian dictatorship. The new government forcibly retired him from all of his positions, as a part of the new government's strategy of coordination (Gleichschaltung).

== Weimar Republic ==
=== Involvement with the German People's Party ===
In 1924, Hepp cooperated with media mogul Alfred Hugenberg and the party's national liberal right-wing in a scheme to weaken Gustav Stresemann, the party's leader and foreign minister. Twenty-five deputies, including Hepp, formed the National Liberal Association of the German People's Party (NLV); this association threatened secession from DVP. Hepp, alongside Friedrich Döbrich, were the only non-industrialist deputies of the DVP who joined the NLV. Nevertheless, Stresemann acted against the new organization, persuading the DVP's leadership to condemn the NLV; the NLV thereafter declared secession from the DVP. However, following the death of noted industrialist Hugo Stinnes, who served as the party's chief benefactor, the party was left decrepit, and became an insignificant force in German politics.

=== Leading the Reichs-Landbund ===
In 1921, Hepp was elected as the first co-president of the recently-formed Reichs-Landbund (RLB), alongside Gustav Roesicke. The RLB was formed as a result of a merger between the longstanding German Agrarian League (BDL), which had become associated with Junkers (the landed nobility of Prussia), and the recently formed German Rural League, who claimed to represent all of Germany's agricultural population. While the BDL had once dominated Germany's agricultural population, their perceived favoritism towards the Junkers and economic deprivation caused by the First World War had eroded their support amongst the radicalized German peasantry. This culminated in the formation of the German Peasants' League and the Bavarian Peasants' League (BB), who collaborated with Germany's socialist parties. (Note: The BB helped overthrow Bavaria's Wittelsbach monarchy and later supported Independent Social Democratic Party of Germany member Kurt Eisner's socialist republic. Source: Jones (2020), p. 57.) Hepp, as a vocal and well-known advocate of Germany's peasantry, was believed to maintain the party's essential support amongst the peasantry. Hepp's election was only reinforced by his participation in the liberal German People's Party, important to the politically neutral RLB of which agrarian interests were previously tied to the German Conservative Party. Despite his election, the RLB was nevertheless dominated by conservative agrarianism, and outside of Hepp, still dominated by the same pre-war statesmen of the BDL.

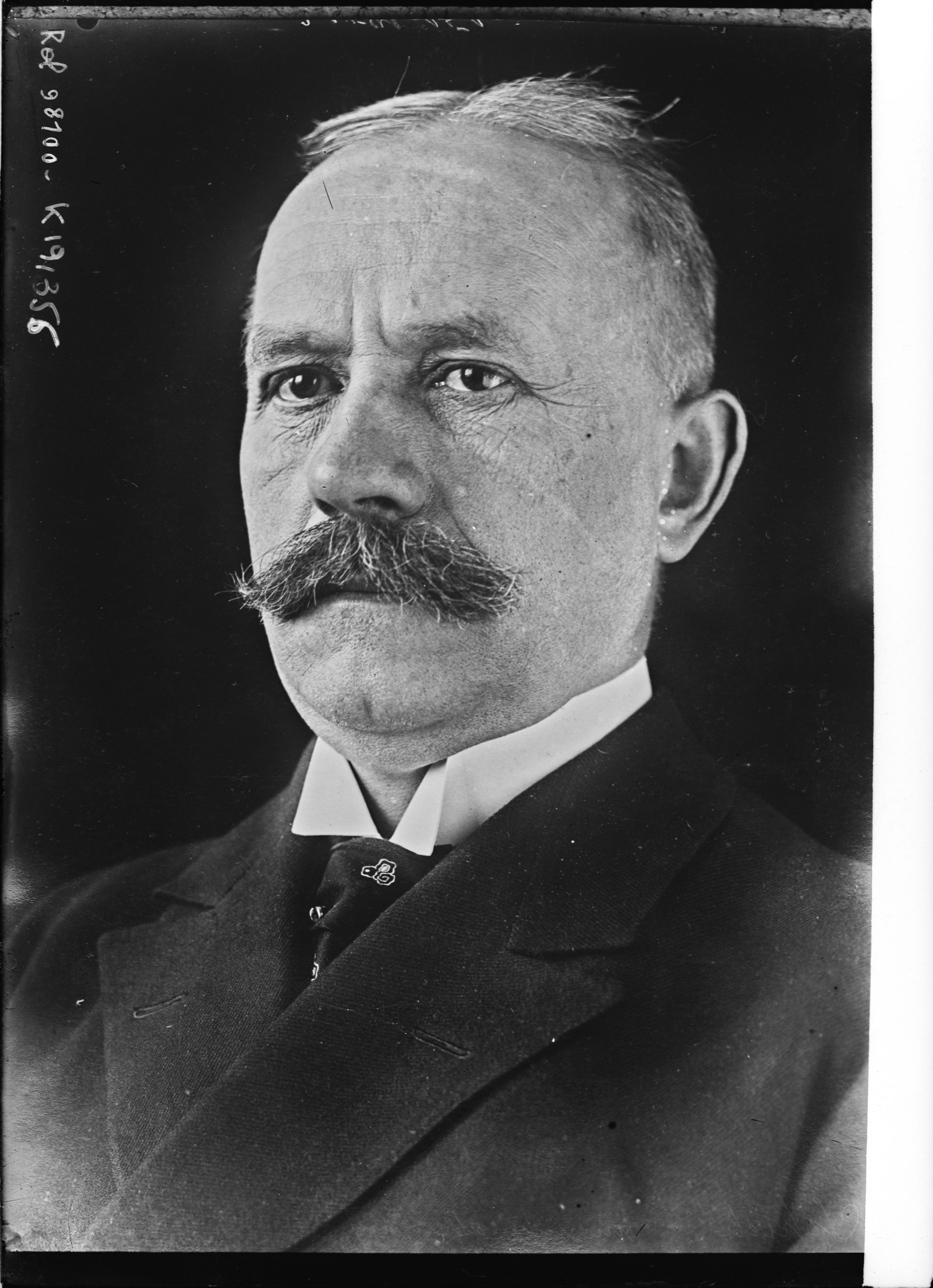
Martin Schiele, Hepp's co-president in the RLB and Minister of Agriculture

In 1925, Paul von Hindenburg — himself a conservative agrarian Junker — was elected president of the Reich. For Hepp, this marked an advantageous shift to the moderate-right which tolerated, if not accepted, the republican system. Prior to 1924, the RLB was dominated by Hepp's jointly serving president, Gustav Roesicke and the Junkers; under his leadership, the RLB rejected Germany's republican system of government, and, despite their initial pledge of neutrality, became affiliated with the national-conservative German National People's Party (DNVP). The party was strongly opposed towards the Republic; in 1923, the party contacted Hans von Seeckt, the chief of the Reichswehr (the military of Germany) in hopes that he might overthrow the Republic. The Republic overcame the challenges against it, culminating in the Dawes Plan. The Dawes Plan required the imposition of new taxes upon the German populace, and with Germany regaining control over tariff policy in 1925, the RLB strived for minimal tax increases on the German agricultural industry. Concurrently, the German National Bank threatened to place new credit restrictions unless the Dawes Plan was approved, pressuring the industry to accept the plan. The party was divided over the acceptance of the plan, with Hepp leading the pro-Dawes faction and Roesicke leading the anti-Dawes faction, backed by the pro-DNVP Junkers. Hepp won out; the RLB executive committee allowed a conscience vote on the subject. In February 1925, Roesicke died; Junker Count Eberhard von Kalckreuth became the new president of the RLB, but Hepp controlled most political affairs, instead of the Junker wing of the RLB. Arno Kriegsheim set the new direction of the party, focused on maintaining agricultural interests above all else. Together, the RLB became dominated by Hepp, Kalckreuth, Kriegsheim, and DNVP deputy Martin Schiele. The debate over the Dawes Plan culminated in the RLB's moderate faction, led by Hepp, to emerge victorious; in 1927 Schiele became Minister of Food and Agriculture, solidifying the RLB's new moderate direction.

In 1925, the Luther government — now in coalition with the national-conservative DNVP — narrowly passed the 1925 tariff bill, establishing tariffs on numerous agricultural goods. Luther's government, guided by Minister of Agriculture Count Gerhard von Kanitz, created the bill as to be an acceptable compromise between German heavy industry and agriculture. Although Hepp and the now-dominant moderates within the RLB supported the bill, seeing it as a necessary step to restore German agriculture, many large Junker grain-producers opposed the bill for failing to protect their industries, decrying it as an insufficient half-measure ruined by compromise with heavy industry. Despite the tariff bill, Germany's agricultural crisis only deepened; simultaneously, the DNVP withdrew from Luther's cabinet over the Locarno Treaties, alarming German agriculture and the RLB. The RLB attempted to install Hepp as Minister of Agriculture, but faced a backlash from nationalist pro-DNVP elements within the organization who accused the RLB's moderate leadership of attempting to form a new political party. German agriculture left 1925 in crisis, despite the Luther government's attempts to fix it.

=== Rise of the Christian-National Peasants' and Farmers' Party ===
==== Creation ====
Logo of the CNBLP

Within the DNVP, Baron Prätorius von Richthofen-Boguslawit, leader of the Silesian wing of the RLB resigned as a member of the DNVP; he was supported by much of the agrarian wing of the party. Count Kuno von Westarp, the new chairman of the DNVP, wished to re-enter the national government to satisfy the demands of the RLB, thereby preventing the secession of the DNVP's agrarian wing. The party did so in 1927, entering into the Fourth Marx Cabinet. Yet Marx's government failed to adequately respond to the agrarian crisis; later that year, mass protests led by the Rural People's Movement erupted across Germany, with Hepp and the RLB failing to keep its members in order. Despite Hepp jointly outlining a series of major agricultural reforms alongside other notable agriculture figures, German peasants had enough. With the lead of the Bavarian Peasants' League (BB), peasant organizations across Germany united into the German Farmers' Party, who ran on a separate list in the upcoming 1928 election. This threw the RLB into chaos, sharply divided over running a list in the upcoming election. The agrarian wing of the DNVP had enough; they announced their secession from the party, creating the Christian-National Peasants' and Farmers' Party (CNBLP). Hepp soon joined the party, becoming one of its most influential leaders. The CNBLP, in contrast to the RLB, focused on the creation of a new economic and social order in Germany, rather than just the economic interests of agriculture. It envisioned a corporatist society, based upon agrarian romanticism and a strong emphasis on Christianity.

For Westarp, who focused on preserving his party's unity, the RLB must be reigned in. Regional branches, including Hepp's own Hesse-Nassau, were supportive of the new party. This threatened the DNVP's traditional dominance over agriculture; Westarp demanded the RLB disavow itself with the new party, but its longstanding political neutrality established all the way back in 1920 halted Westarp's efforts. Nevertheless the RLB stood sharply divided; on one side stood Hepp and the Hessian-Nassau and Thuringian branches of the RLB, who supported the CNBLP, and on the other side stood Hepp's co-president Eberhard von Kalckreuth and agricultural minister Martin Schiele, who supported the DNVP. This crisis was resolved by the creation a new three-man presidium, with Schiele as president and Hepp taking on the vice-presidential role. Hepp was re-elected to re-affirm the party's political neutrality from the ongoing DNVP–CNBLP dispute, so as to have both a DNVP (Schiele) and CNBLP (Hepp) leadership in the party.

In October, Hepp met with the leadership of the paramilitary Der Stahlhelm, who wished to reform the Weimar constitution, and gave his tentative support to the referendum. However, after DNVP Chairman Alfred Hugenberg's addition of the controversial Freedom Clause (at the behest of NSDAP leader Adolf Hitler), and his failure to consult with Hepp and other prominent figures, (Note: Friedrich Döbrich of the CNBLP and Schiele. Source: Jones (2020), p. 480–481.) Hepp and his organizations — the CNBLP and the RLB — withdrew their support from the resolution. A final change to the referendum recommitted the CNBLP to reforming the Weimar constitution, if not supporting the referendum itself. Despite the referendum narrowly meeting its objective, the victory was pyrrhic at best; the German Right lay fractured between its reformist wing and the radical-right, led by Hugenberg and the rising Hitler.

=== Division ===
In 1930, discontent over Hugenberg's strategy of katastrophenpolitik (transl. catastrophe politics) led to the breakaway of moderate elements within the party, who established the Conservative People's Party (KVP). The schism within the DNVP created potential for an electoral alliance and collaboration with the fledgling KVP, which wished to form a united progressive-conservative party. Despite the formation of the Christian-National Coalition (an initial alliance with the KVP) as a stopgap measure, the CNBLP declined further collaboration with the breakaway party, despite support from DNVP-turned CNBLP deputies Hans Schlange-Schöningen and Günther Gereke. Hepp vocally opposed tying the party to the KVP, arguing it would lose the party's distinctive vocational status for German agriculture. Schiele later proposed the creation of a united, national agrarian political party, tying together the RLB and the CNBLP. This party would act as the rural sister party to the KVP, with both parties engaging in parliamentary and non-parliamentary collaboration. Just as with the earlier proposal for cooperation with the KVP, Hepp strongly opposed the creation of a new party, for much the same reasons. While Hepp's vocal opposition prevented cooperation from the RLB, Ernst Höfer, the new chairman of the CNBLP, negotiated an electoral alliance with the KVP, supported by a donation to the CNBLP of 30,000 marks from industrialists Martin Blank and Martin Sogemeier. Nevertheless, Hepp and his allies prevented the CNBLP from signing onto the Hindenburg Program, a joint election platform created by the German People's Party, the Economic Party, and the KVP, for the upcoming 1930 German federal election.

In 1933, Hepp was held in protective custody by the new Nazi government of Germany, who stripped him of all his positions as a part of the process of coordination (Gleichschaltung). He joined the Nazi party in 1937, before co-editing a book on the Nazi party in Hesse-Nassau, which was published in 1941.

=== Other activities in the Weimar Republic ===
In 1928, Hepp became Wetzlar's president of its Chamber of Agriculture.

== Federal Republic of Germany ==
In 1952, the Hessian city of Wiesbaden made Hepp an honorary city councilor. In the 1953 West German federal election, Hepp was elected as a deputy for the Free Democratic Party (FDP). Under the FDP, he ran in the Landtag of Hesse, but lost his election. Along with other deputies, he broke away from the FDP in 1956; he soon co-founded the Free People's Party. This party later merged with the German Party, of which Hepp would serve as a deputy of until he lost his seat in the 1957 West German federal election. Hepp's parliamentary career was over.

Hepp died on 3 January 1970, in Wiesbaden.

== Literature ==
- Hepp, Karl (1922). Ernährung und Landwirtschaft [Food and Agriculture] (in German). Berlin: Staatspolitischer Verlag.
- Gimbel, Adalbert; Hepp, Karl, eds. (1941). So kämpften wir!: Schilderungen aus der Kampfzeit der NSDAP im Gau Hessen-Nassau ["This Is How We Fought!: Accounts from the NSDAP's Years of Struggle in the Gau of Hesse-Nassau"] (in German). Frankfurt am Main: Franz Eher Nachfolger.
