= Freybe =

Freybe is a surname. Notable people with the surname include:

- Carl Freybe (1886–1982), German politician
- Jutta Freybe (1917–1971), German stage and film actress
