= Bauser =

Bauser is a surname of German origin, originating as a nickname for a heavy drinker or eater. Notable people with the surname include:

- Adolf Bauser (1880–1948), German teacher
- Ronnie Bauser (1928–2017), South African rugby union player

== See also ==
- Bauer (surname)
