= Adolf Bauser =

German politician (1880–1948)

- Born: 11 December 1880; Entringen, Kingdom of Württemberg, German Empire
- Died: 16 November 1948 (aged 67); Stuttgart, Württemberg-Baden, West Germany (now Germany)
- Military career
- Allegiance: German Empire; Nazi Germany
- Branch: Imperial German Army
- Service years: 1914–1918
- Conflicts: World War I
- Other work: Schoolteacher

Adolf Bauser (11 December 1880 – 16 November 1948) was a German teacher, member of the Reichstag for the Reich Party for Civil Rights and Deflation and delegate for the Christian Democratic Union in the Landtag of Württemberg-Baden.

Bauser came to politics in the German Empire as a member of the Progressive People's Party and following the establishment of the Weimar Republic he switched to the German Democratic Party. However, as a response to the inflation in the Weimar Republic Bauser, in 1923, became a founder member of the Sparerbundes für das Deutsche Reich, a pressure group for professionals hit by inflation. In August 1926 this group established the Reich Party for Civil Rights and Deflation (commonly known as VRP from its other name Volksrechtpartei) and Bauer was appointed party chairman. The group sought greater influence for its members in order to force revaluation.

On 10 June 1929 Bauser was appointed to the Landtag des freien Volksstaats Württemberg following a judgement of court, remaining a member until April 1932. At the Reichstag election in July 1932 he became the only VRP member to be elected to the national parliament after the party concluded a pact with the Christian Social People's Service. After losing his seat that November Bauser spent the remainder of the Weimar period in an unsuccessful attempt at building a united party of the centre. Little is known of Bauser's life under the Nazi Party although he was dismissed from his teaching post in 1939.

Following the overthrow of the Nazis Bauser became director of the Pädagogischen Instituts in Stuttgart in 1945. He returned to politics in 1947 as a leading figure in the Zentralverbands der Fliegergeschädigten, Evakuierten und Währungsgeschädigten (ZVF) and was involved in publishing the ZVF magazine Selbsthilfe. He represented the CDU in the Landtag of Württemberg-Baden from its formation in 1946 until his death in 1948.
