= November 1932 German federal election =

- 6 November 1932

All 584 seats in the Reichstag 293 seats needed for a majority
- Registered: 44,374,085 (▲0.4%)
- Turnout: 80.6% (▼3.5pp)
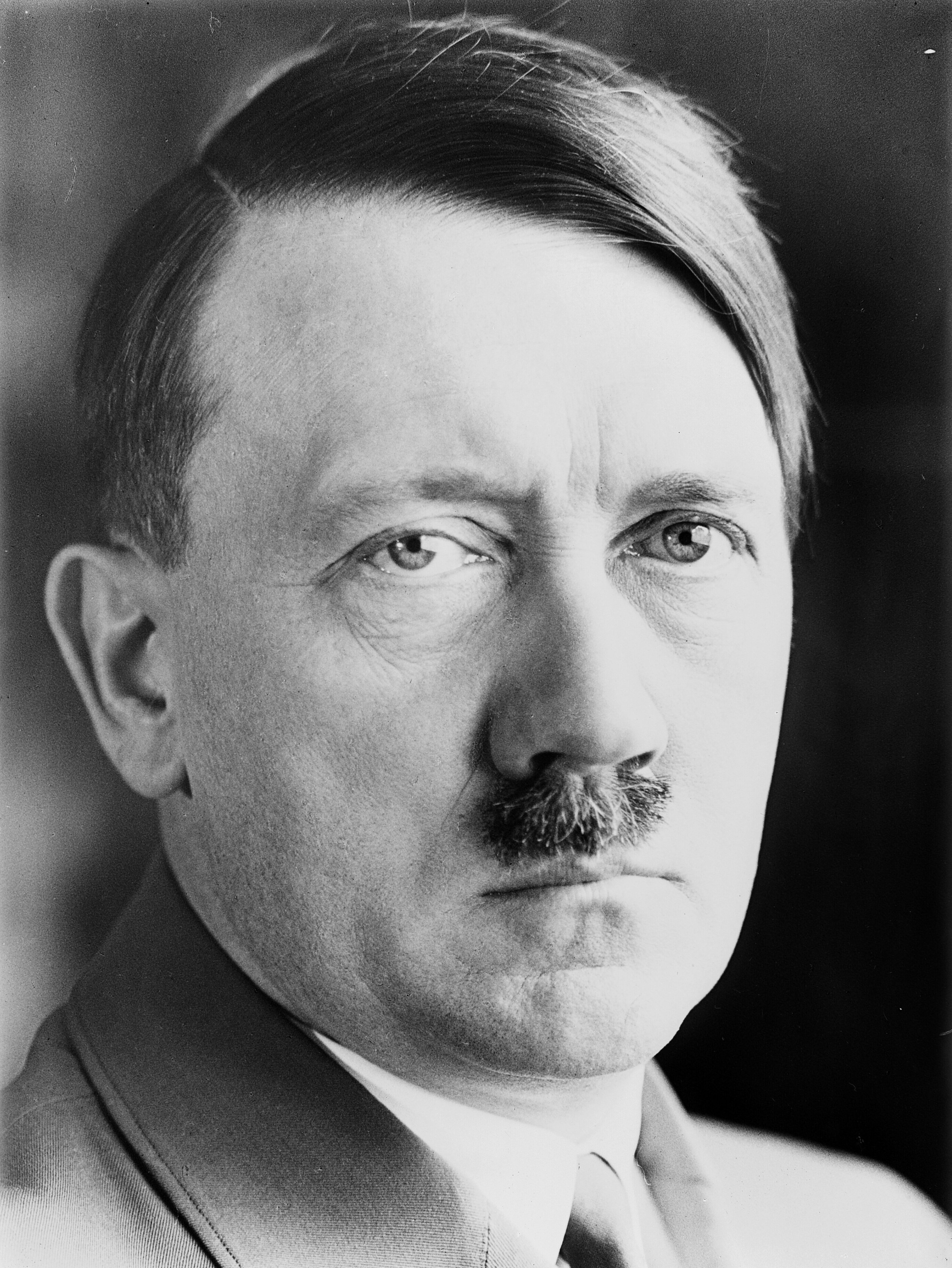

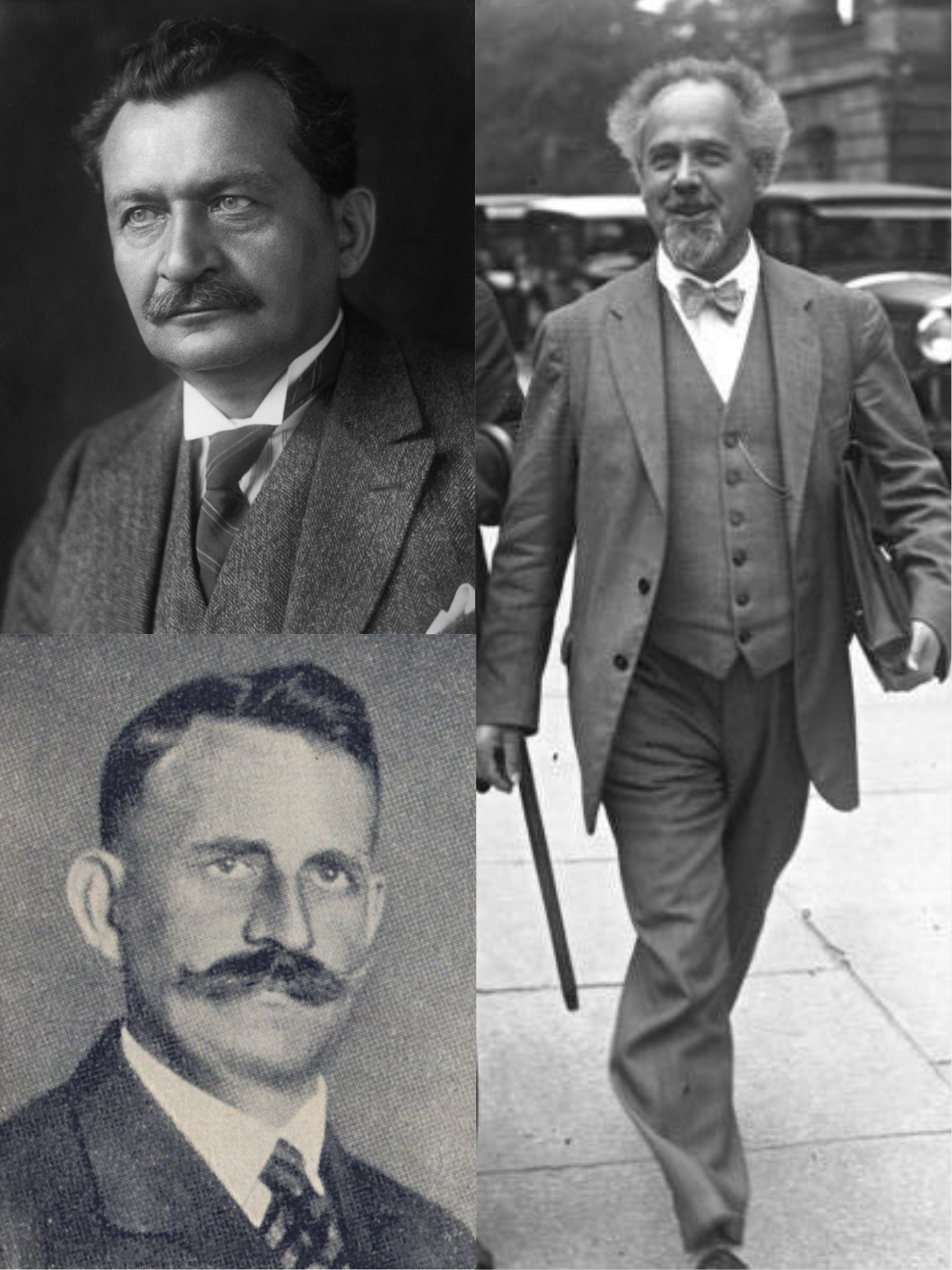

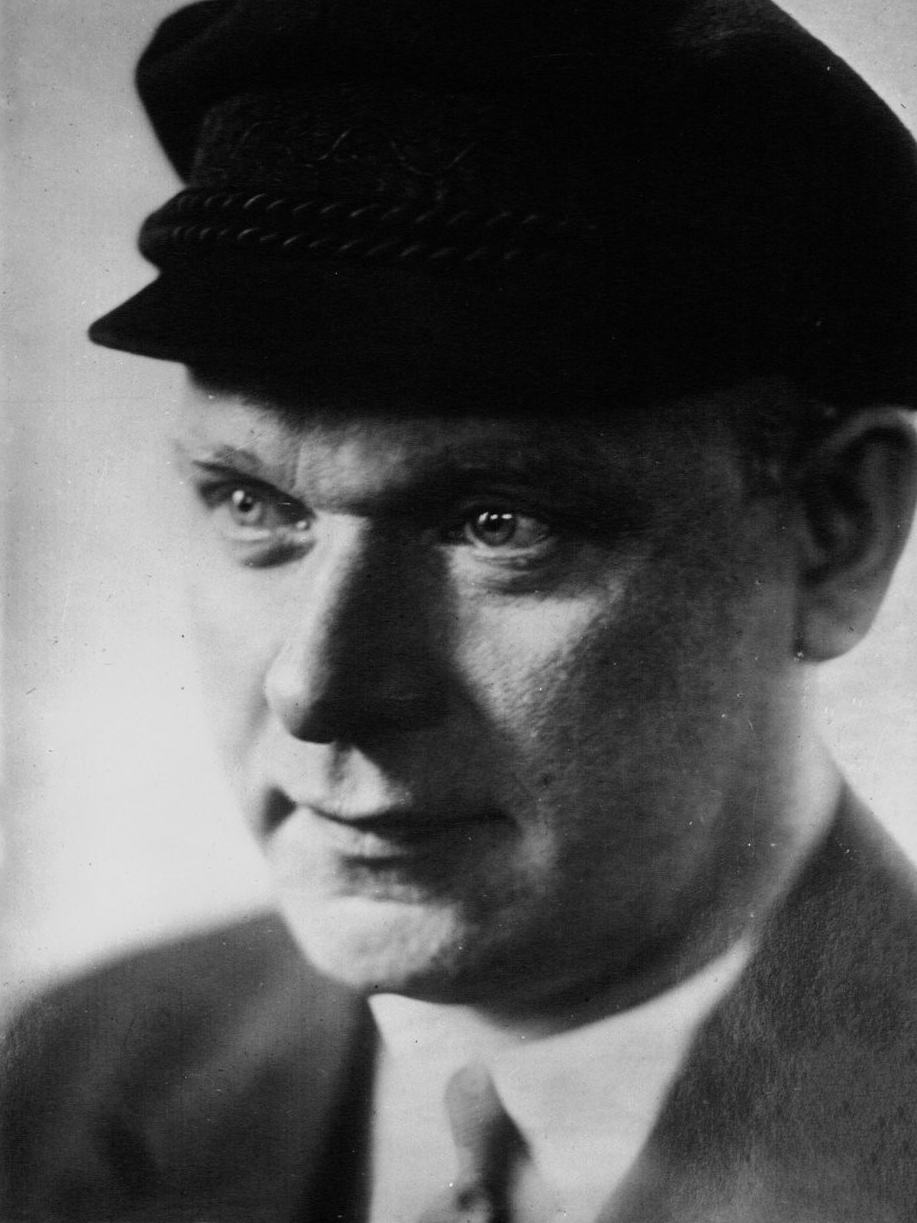

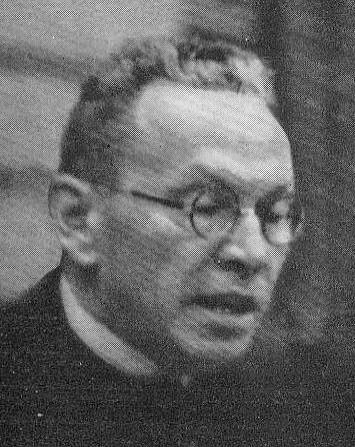

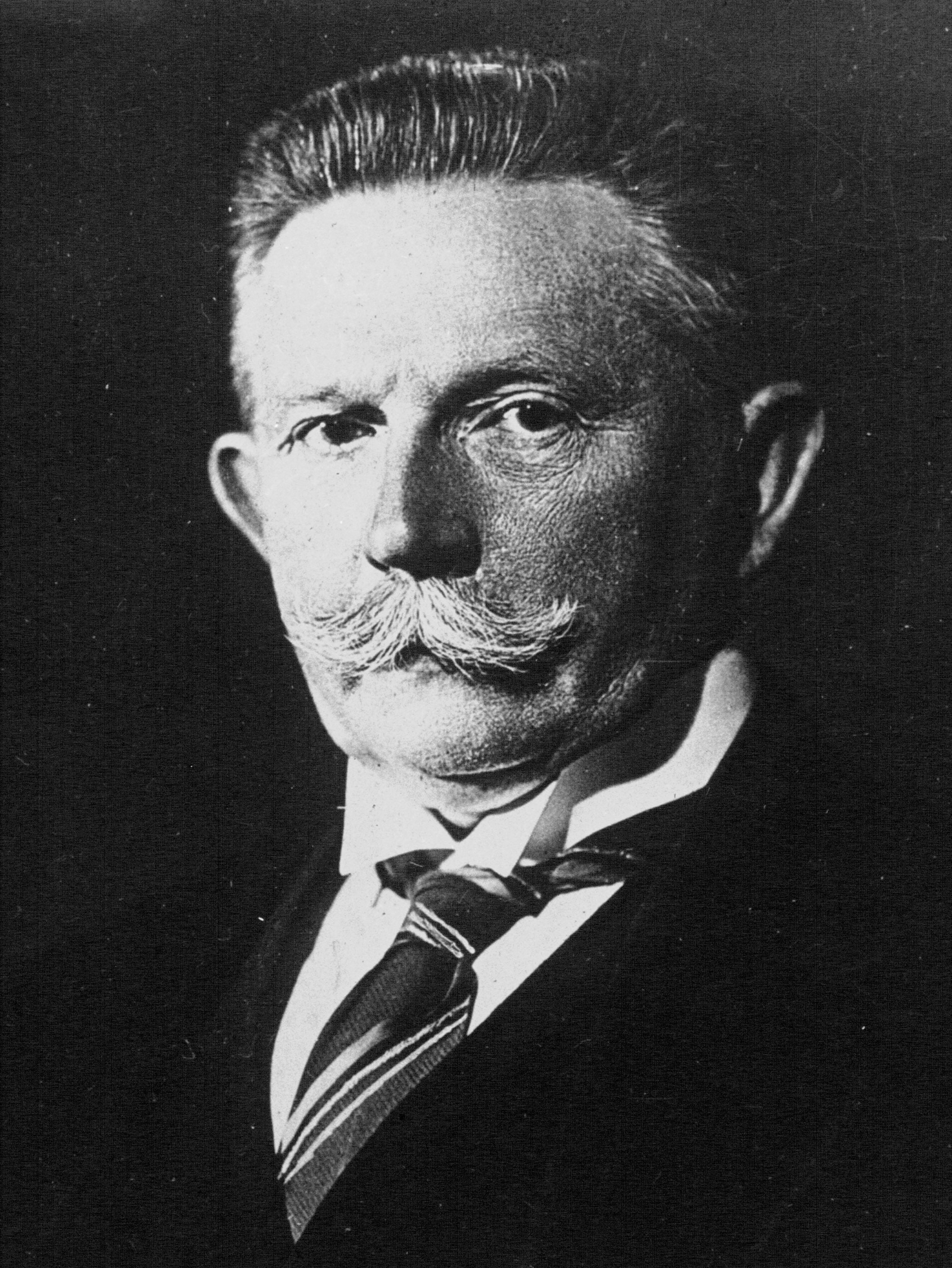

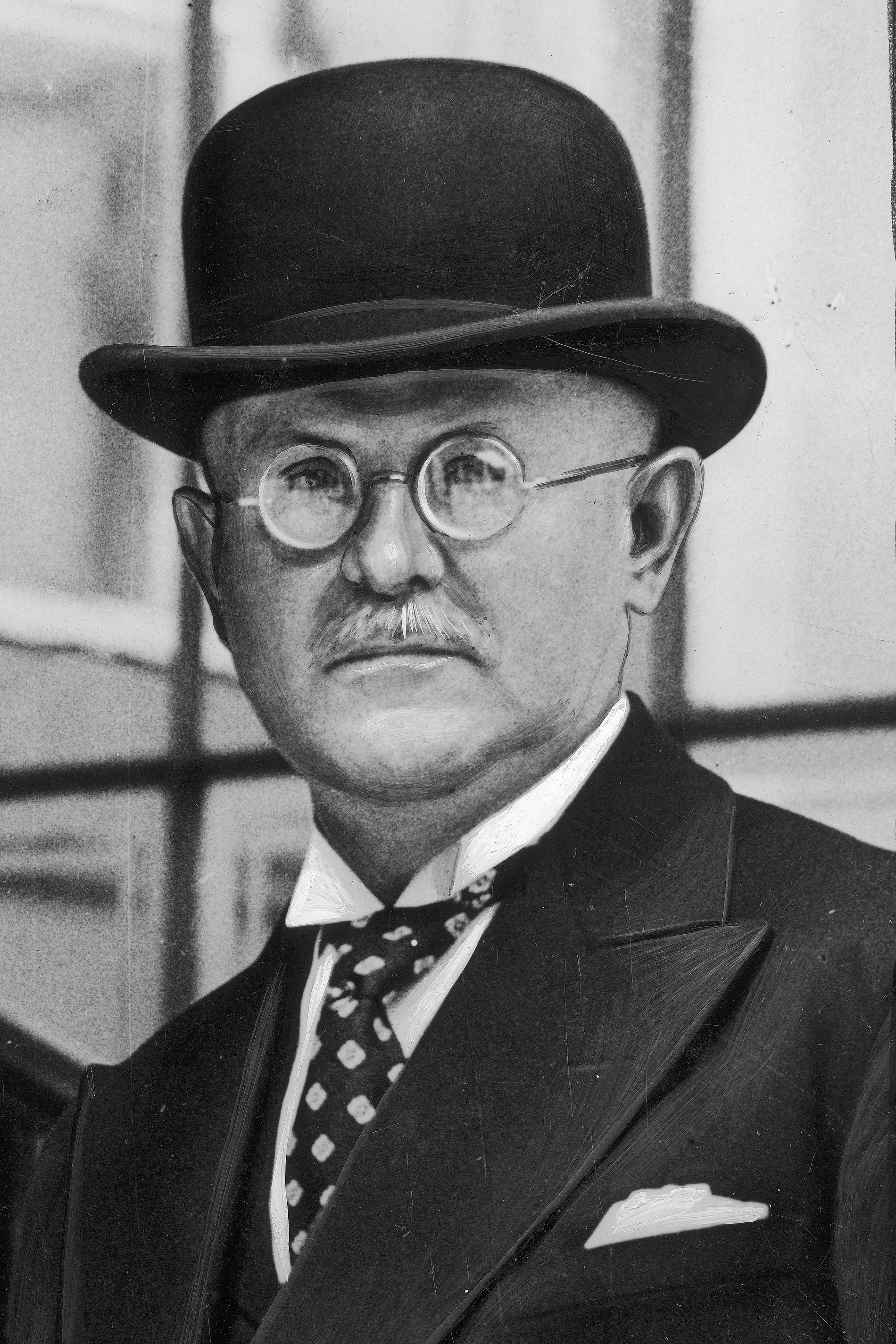
	First party	Second party	Third party
Leader	Adolf Hitler	Otto Wels; Arthur Crispien; Hans Vogel	Ernst Thälmann
Party	NSDAP	SPD	KPD
Last election	37.3%, 230 seats	21.6%, 133 seats	14.3%, 89 seats
Seats won	196	121	100
Seat change	▼34	▼12	▲11
Popular vote	11,737,021	7,247,091	5,980,239
Percentage	33.1%	20.4%	16.9%
Swing	▼4.2 pp	▼1.2 pp	▲2.6 pp
	Fourth party	Fifth party	Sixth party
Leader	Ludwig Kaas	Alfred Hugenberg	Heinrich Held
Party	Centre	DNVP	BVP
Last election	12.4%, 75 seats	5.9%, 37 seats	3.2%, 22 seats
Seats won	70	51	20
Seat change	▼5	▲14	▼2
Popular vote	4,230,545	2,959,053	1,094,597
Percentage	11.9%	8.3%	3.1%
Swing	▼0.5 pp	▲2.4 pp	▼0.1 pp
Government before election
Papen cabinet
Ind.–DNVP
Government after election
Schleicher cabinet
Ind.–DNVP

Federal elections were held in Germany on 6 November 1932. The Nazi Party saw its vote share fall by four percentage points from the July 1932 election, while there were slight increases for the Communist Party of Germany and the national conservative German National People's Party. The results were a great disappointment for the Nazis, who lost 34 seats and again failed to form a coalition government in the Reichstag. These elections were the last that were free and fair before the Nazis seized power the following year, although another relatively contested election would be held four months later.

== Background ==
The Nazi Party and Communist Party (KPD) held over half of the seats in the Reichstag after the July 1932 election. This made it impossible to form a government composed of moderates. Chancellor Franz von Papen could only rely on the support of the German National People's Party (DNVP) and German People's Party (DVP), who only held a total of 44 seats. A vote of no confidence was put forward by the KPD and supported by 84% of the deputies. A new election was scheduled for November.

Over 6 million people were unemployed in 1932, and 40% of organized labour was unemployed or working reduced hours in summer 1932.

== Results ==
This was the first time since 1928 that voter turnout decreased.

The KPD regained its plurality of the popular vote in Berlin from the 1930 election, which was interrupted by the Nazis in the July election.

Party or alliance		Votes	%	+/–	Seats	+/–
Nazi Party (Hitler Movement)	Nazi Party	11,737,021	33.09	−4.18	196	−34
Nazi Party (Hitler Movement)	Party for the Unemployed for Work and Bread	140	0.00	0.00	0	0
Nazi Party (Hitler Movement)	National German Catholic Reich Party	137	0.00	New	0	New
Nazi Party (Hitler Movement)	German Reich against Interest Rate Movement	97	0.00	New	0	New
Social Democratic Party	Social Democratic Party	7,247,901	20.43	−1.15	121	−12
Social Democratic Party	Radical Democratic Party	3,789	0.01	New	0	New
Communist Party of Germany	Communist Party of Germany	5,980,239	16.86	+2.54	100	+11
Communist Party of Germany	Unitarianist Union of Germany	290	0.00	0.00	0	0
Communist Party of Germany	Middle Class Party	85	0.00	New	0	New
Centre Party		4,230,545	11.93	−0.51	70	−5
German National People's Party	German National People's Party	2,959,053	8.34	+2.43	51	+14
German National People's Party	German People's Party	660,889	1.86	+0.68	11	+4
German National People's Party	Radical Middle Class	60,246	0.17	+0.15	0	0
German National People's Party	Thuringian Agricultural League	60,062	0.17	New	1	New
German National People's Party	For Hindenburg and Papen	27,752	0.08	New	0	New
German National People's Party	Kleinrentner, Inflationsgeschädigte und Vorkriegsgeldbesitzer	15,727	0.04	0.00	0	0
German National People's Party	Handwerker, Handels- und Gewerbetreibende	5,189	0.01	0.00	0	0
German National People's Party	Enteigneter Mittelstand	2,737	0.01	0.00	0	0
German National People's Party	Haus- und Landwirtepartei	461	0.00	New	0	New
German National People's Party	German Social Monarchist Party	355	0.00	0.00	0	0
German National People's Party	Freiheitsbewegung Schwarz-Weiß-Rot	92	0.00	New	0	New
Bavarian People's Party	Bavarian People's Party	1,094,597	3.09	−0.14	20	−2
Bavarian People's Party	Reich Party of the German Middle Class	110,309	0.31	−0.09	1	−1
Bavarian People's Party	German National Citizen Bloc	192	0.00	New	0	New
Bavarian People's Party	Kampfbund der Lohn- und Gehaltsabgebauten	63	0.00	New	0	New
Christian Social People's Service	Christian Social People's Service (Evangelical Movement)	403,666	1.14	+0.15	5	+2
Christian Social People's Service	German-Hanoverian Party	63,966	0.18	+0.05	1	+1
Christian Social People's Service	Reich Party for Civil Rights and Deflation	46,202	0.13	+0.02	0	−1
Christian Social People's Service	Schicksalsgemeinschaft deutscher Erwerbslosen, Kleinhandel und Gewerbe	9,250	0.03	New	0	New
Christian Social People's Service	German Workers Party	308	0.00	0.00	0	0
German State Party	German State Party	336,447	0.95	−0.06	2	−2
German State Party	National Freedom Party of Germany	1,810	0.01	+0.01	0	0
German State Party	German Reform Party	352	0.00	0.00	0	0
German Farmers' Party	German Farmers' Party	149,026	0.42	+0.05	3	+1
German Farmers' Party	Christian-National Peasants' and Farmers' Party	46,382	0.13	−0.12	0	−1
Württemberg Farmers' and Winegrowers' Association (Agricultural League)		105,220	0.30	+0.04	2	0
Socialist Workers' Party of Germany		45,201	0.13	−0.07	0	0
Minority Bloc (Association of National Minorities in Germany)	Polish List	32,988	0.09	0.00	0	0
Minority Bloc (Association of National Minorities in Germany)	Schleswig Home	1,694	0.00	0.00	0	0
Free Economy Party of Germany		11,002	0.03	0.00	0	0
Social Republican Party of Germany		8,395	0.02	New	0	New
National Social Party of the Middle Class	National Social Party of the Middle Class	3,052	0.01	New	0	New
National Social Party of the Middle Class	Greater German People's Party (Schmalix List)	1,311	0.00	0.00	0	0
Workers' and Farmers' Struggle Community		3,308	0.01	0.00	0	0
Nationalist Party		588	0.00	New	0	New
People's Socialists		518	0.00	New	0	New
National Communist Party of Germany		381	0.00	New	0	New
Greater German Middle Class Party for Middle Class Dictatorship		286	0.00	New	0	New
Gerechtigkeits-Bewegung-Meißner		280	0.00	New	0	New
German Socialist Struggle Movement		101	0.00	0.00	0	0
Total		35,469,702	100.00	–	584	–24
Valid votes		35,469,702	99.20			
Invalid/blank votes		287,471	0.80			
Total votes		35,757,173	100.00			
Registered voters/turnout		44,374,085	80.58			
Source: Gonschior.de

== Aftermath ==
After the election, von Papen urged Hindenburg to continue to rule by decree, while at the same time attempting to form a coalition with the Nazis. Negotiations failed and Papen was dismissed by Hindenburg, who replaced him with Defence minister Kurt von Schleicher.

In the subsequent two months, Schleicher held talks with a faction of the Nazi Party led by Gregor Strasser in an attempt at a Querfront strategy, attempting to unite Strasserists, the SPD, the Centre Party and the trade unions. The plans failed when Hitler disempowered Strasser and approached Papen for coalition talks; it is disputed if Schleicher was actually serious about his proposal. Since Schleicher's ineffective rule was growing increasingly unpopular among German elites, Papen convinced Hindenburg to dismiss him and appoint Hitler as Chancellor on 30 January 1933, with a cabinet composed of NSDAP and DNVP politicians; the new government lacked a majority in the Reichstag, so a snap election was called and scheduled for March by Hindenburg.

On 27 February, the Reichstag was set on fire allegedly by Dutch council communist Marinus van der Lubbe: in response, the Reichstag Fire Decree was enacted, suspending basic liberties and allowing the Nazis to conduct mass arrests of KPD members and freely engage in paramilitary violence against their opponents.

The elections were the last free and fair all-German election before the Nazi seizure of power, since the subsequent vote in March saw massive suppression against opposition politicians, especially SPD and KPD ones. The next free national elections were not held until 1949 in West Germany and 1990 in East Germany. The next free all-German elections took place in December 1990, after reunification two months earlier.

== Works cited ==
- Childers, Thomas (1983). The Nazi Voter: The Social Foundations of Fascism in Germany, 1919-1933. University of North Carolina Press. ISBN 0807815705.
- Hamilton, Richard (1982). Who Voted for Hitler?. Princeton University Press. ISBN 0691093954.
