= Wilhelm Dreher =

German politician

Wilhelm Dreher (10 January 1892 in Ay an der Iller, Neu-Ulm district – 19 November 1969 in Senden) was a German politician with the Nazi Party.

The son of an office assistant, he attended elementary school in Stuttgart, where he subsequently completed an apprenticeship as a toolmaker between 1906 and 1909. During his travels, Dreher worked in Switzerland, among other places.

In 1910, Dreher joined the Imperial German Navy, where he spent two and a half years in the East Asia Squadron and then went to the torpedo school. During World War I, Dreher was deployed almost continuously on front-line ships. In 1918, he took part in the Kiel mutiny. In the same year, he was discharged from the Navy and joined the SPD . In 1919, he married and had one child.

Dreher was one of the first 12 Nazi Party deputies elected to the Reichstag at the 1928 parliamentary election. He represented electoral constituency 31 (Württemberg) and retained his seat until the defeat of Nazi Germany. In the early 1930s, he was close to Gregor Strasser for a time. He was recognised within the Nazi Party as an economics specialist and he wrote on this topic for Völkischer Beobachter, the official Nazi newspaper. In 1933, he became the Polizeidirektor (police chief) in Ulm and an SS-Oberführer in the Schutzstaffel (SS).
