= Christian-National Peasants' and Farmers' Party =

Political party in Germany, 1928–1932

Christian-National Peasants' and Farmers' Party Christlich-Nationale Bauern- und Landvolkpartei
- Leader: Karl Hepp
- Founder: Franz Hänse; Friedrich Döbrich; Wilhelm Dorsch
- Founded: March 8 1928
- Dissolved: 1930s
- Split from: DNVP
- Ideology: Agrarianism; Corporatism; German nationalism

The Christian-National Peasants' and Farmers' Party (German: Christlich-Nationale Bauern- und Landvolkpartei, or CNBL) was an agrarian political party of Weimar Germany. It split from the German National People's Party (DNVP) in 1928, having previously been part of the party's agrarian faction, which fought for (limited) participation in government.

== History ==
The group had emerged shortly before the 1928 election at which the DNVP suffered losses. In response the party appointed the Alfred Hugenberg as leader and he adopted a policy of opposition to the Weimar Republic, the party having previously been critical of, but largely engaged with, the system. Hugenberg's ideas gained support among the large landowners but many of the smaller owners who were associated with the DNVP were alarmed by the shift and on February 17th Franz Hänse and Friedrich Döbrich from the Thuringian Rural League along with Wilhelm Dorsch from the Hessian Rural League (Hessischer Landbund) took matters into their own hands by announcing their resignation from the DNVP Reichstag delegation to join a new agrarian party that called itself the Christian-National Peasants’ Party. The new group was based in Hessen and Thuringia. The fact that the three most important figures in the new parties founding had all been defectors from the DNVP raised suspicions that the party was only formed to trick peasants into voting for it, and that after the election it would immediately rejoin the DNVP. The parties legitimacy was greatly increased however when Karl Hepp, a DVP parliamentarian and an influential agrarian politician joined the party. The parties foundation was officially announced on March 8th in the town of Weimar.

In an article written shortly after the parties founding Ernst Höfer, chairman of the Thuringian Rural League wrote that the parties goal was to quell growing rural unrest and radicalization by giving rural voters and effective political voice. He argued that since the non-socialist parties had repeatedly sacrificed the interests of rural Germans for the sake of other Germans that the rural Germans needed their own party.

The party has been characterised as part of a wider attempt by the middle classes to assert their economic interests in the mid to late 1920s by founding their own, fairly narrowly based, parties, including the German Farmers' Party and in urban areas the Reich Party for Civil Rights and Deflation and Reich Party of the German Middle Class.

In the 1928 election the party received over 580,000 votes and elected nine deputies to the Reichstag. The CNBLP’s hopes of establishing a parliamentary alliance with the more democratically oriented German Peasant’s Party, however, collapsed when Anton Fehr, the chairman of the Peasants’ Party, decided to instead form a coalition with the Economic Party. This then led to the party being isolated within the Reichstag.

The party contested the 1928 in coalition with the German-Hanoverian Party to win nine seats individually and 13 for the coalition. It increased its share in 1930 to a party high of 19 seats as part of a Deutsches Landvolk group that captured 26 seats and included the Hanoverians, the Conservative People's Party and a smaller group using the name Konservative Volkspartei und Deutsch-Hannoversche Partei. Under the name Deutsches Landvolk it was part of the German National People's Party's bloc for the July 1932 election and managed to gain only one seat. They were eliminated from the Reichstag at the November 1932 election.
