= Carl Freybe =

German politician

Carl Heinrich Max Freybe (September 26, 1886 (Stettin) – September 8, 1982 (Bielefeld)) was a German politician (business party) and official of the Association of Butchers.

== Life and work ==
=== Youth and World War I (1886 to 1918) ===
Freybe was born the son of a butcher. He attended the Schiller High School in Stettin to Grade 7. From 1902 to 1904, he completed an apprenticeship as a butcher. From 1907 to 1908 he served on the West Pomeranian 38th Field Artillery Regiment. In 1910 he passed the certification test, then worked as a butcher with his father in Stettin. In 1912 he started his own business, and was married the same year.

From August 1914, Freybe served in World War I, and was commissioned as a lieutenant in the reserves. He was awarded Iron Cross medals (1st and 2nd class).

=== Weimar and Nazi era (1919 to 1945) ===
After World War I, Freybe was a member of the German Mittelstand (Middle Class Party). In the May 1928 Reichstag election, Freybe was elected a representative for Pomerania, a seat which he held for two legislative periods, until July 1932. He worked particularly hard for the interests of his own profession, but also worked for the interests of manual trades in general and the industrial middle class.

Freybe also worked for craft and trade organizations. He was chairman of the German Butchers Association for Pomerania in 1928 as well as head of the Stettin Butchers' Guild from 1928 to 1935. In 1934 he was appointed "Honorary Master of (all) Trades in Pomerania".

In the Second World War Freybe served as an officer in various capacities. His wife was killed in August 1944 during an air raid on Stettin. The Freybe family home, built in 1891 and containing Freybe's company offices, was also destroyed.

=== Post-War Period ===
After Stettin became part of Poland in 1945, Freybe started a new business in Hanover. In addition, Freybe worked for the German Butchers Association, of which he became the deputy chairman in 1950. In 1978, the Butchers Association created the Carl Freybe Medal, awarded every three years.

Carl Freybe later joined the FDP, running unsuccessfully in the Lower Saxony slate of candidates in the 1953 national election. In 1957 he became the chairman of the Union of German Middle Class Parties. As chairman, he ran unsuccessfully as the lead candidate in the 1957 national election.

== Publications ==
- I saw Canada. Report on a journey from the Atlantic to the Pacific. 1954.
- The technology in the meat industry. 1962.
