= July 1932 German federal election =

- 31 July 1932

All 608 seats in the Reichstag 305 seats needed for a majority
- Registered: 44,211,216 (▲2.9%)
- Turnout: 84.1% (▲2.1pp)
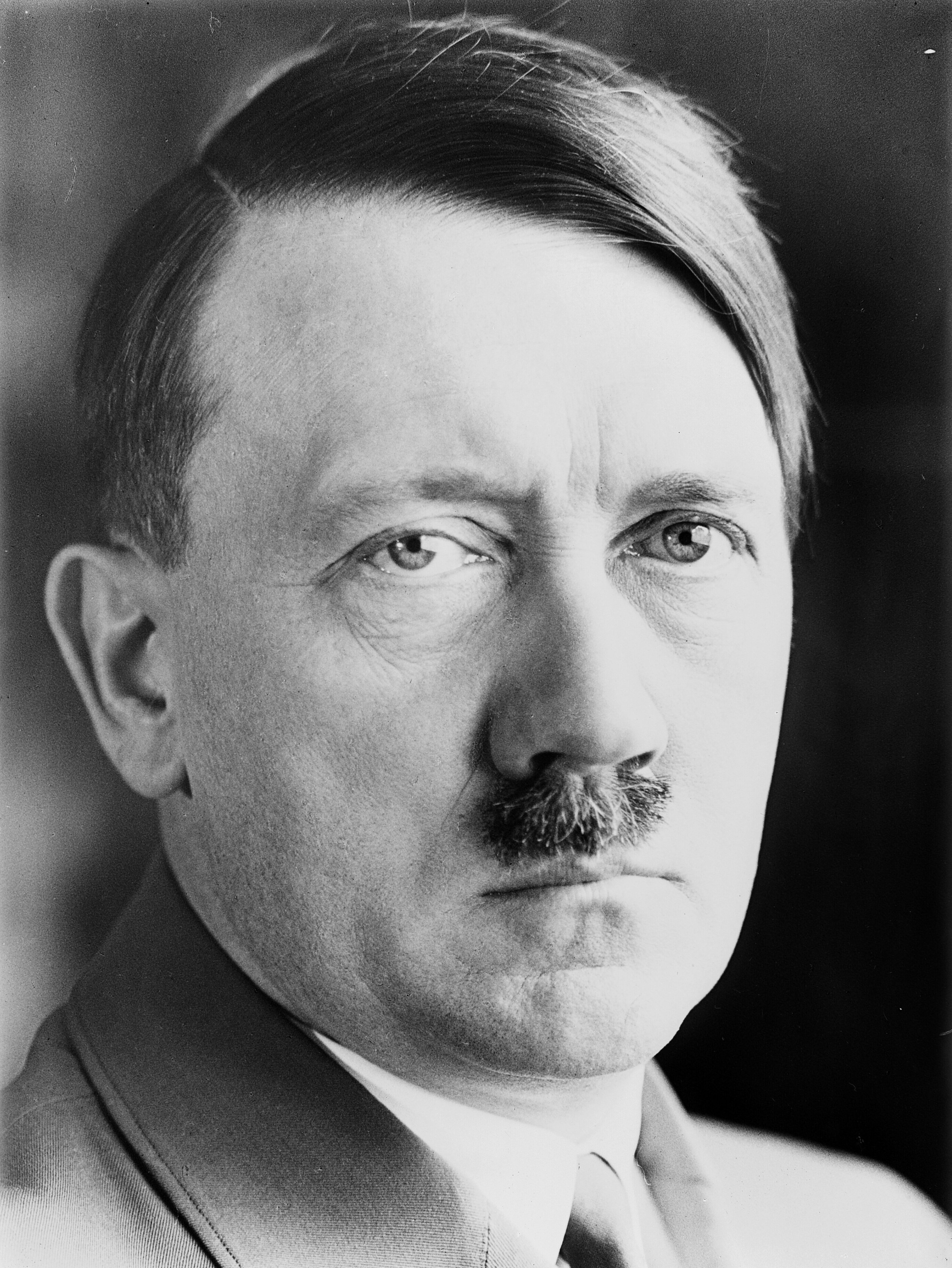

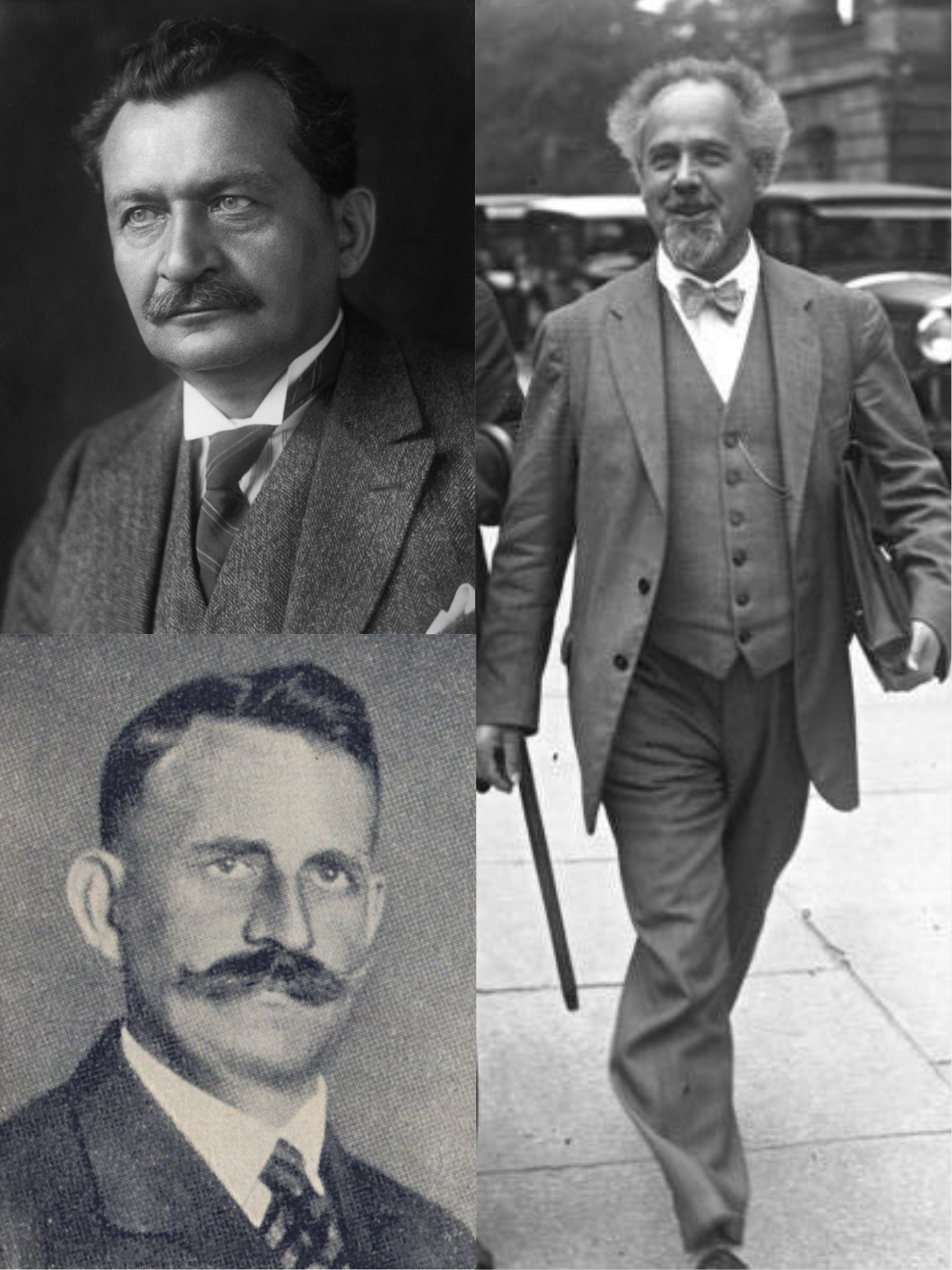

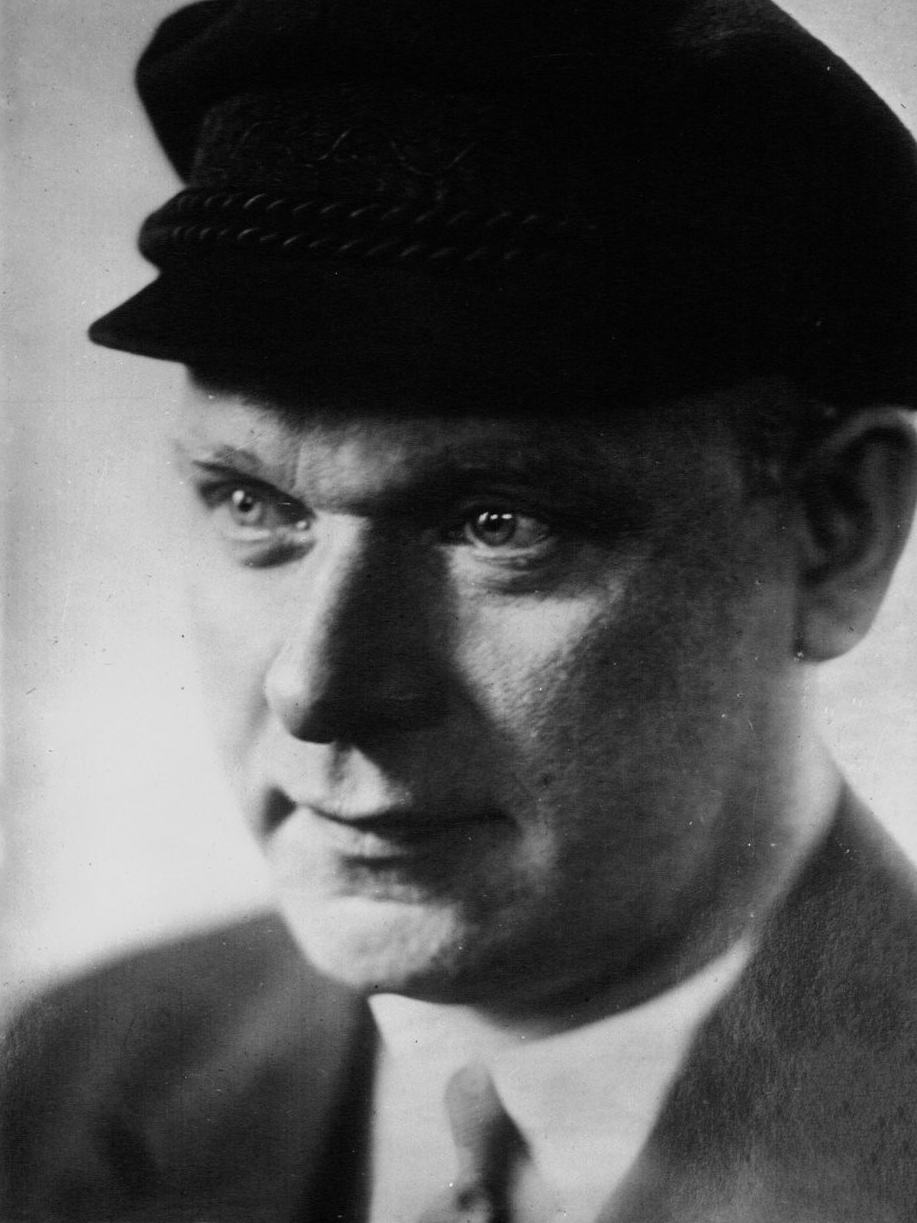

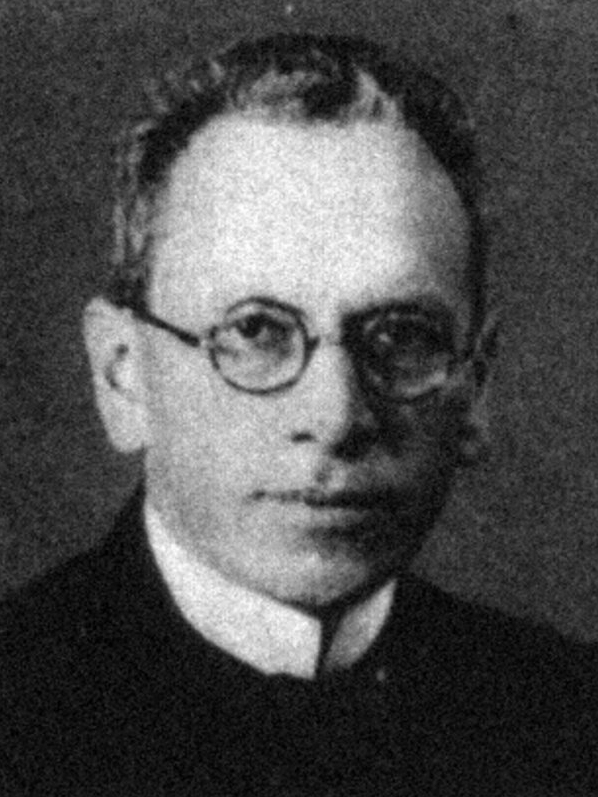

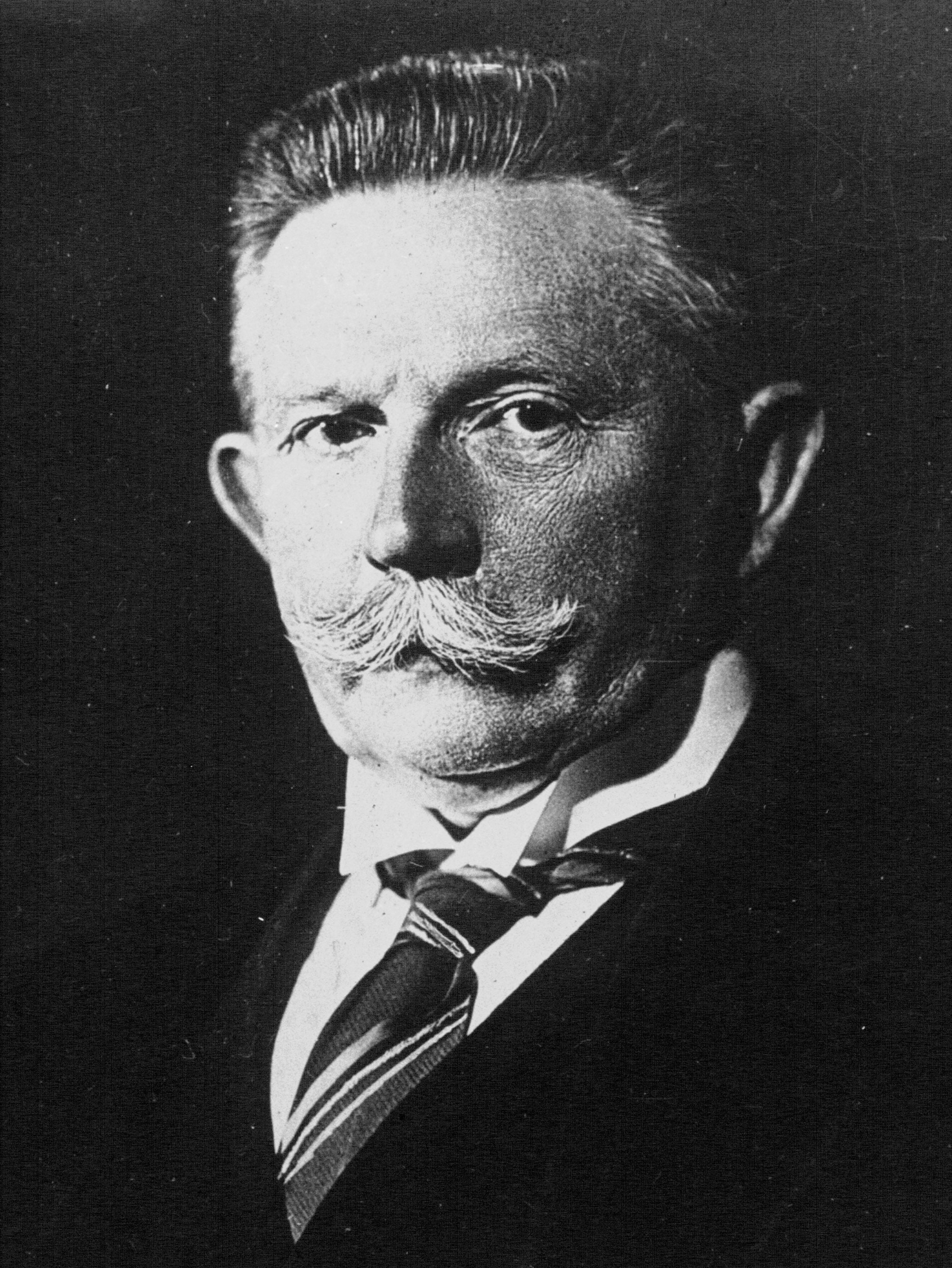

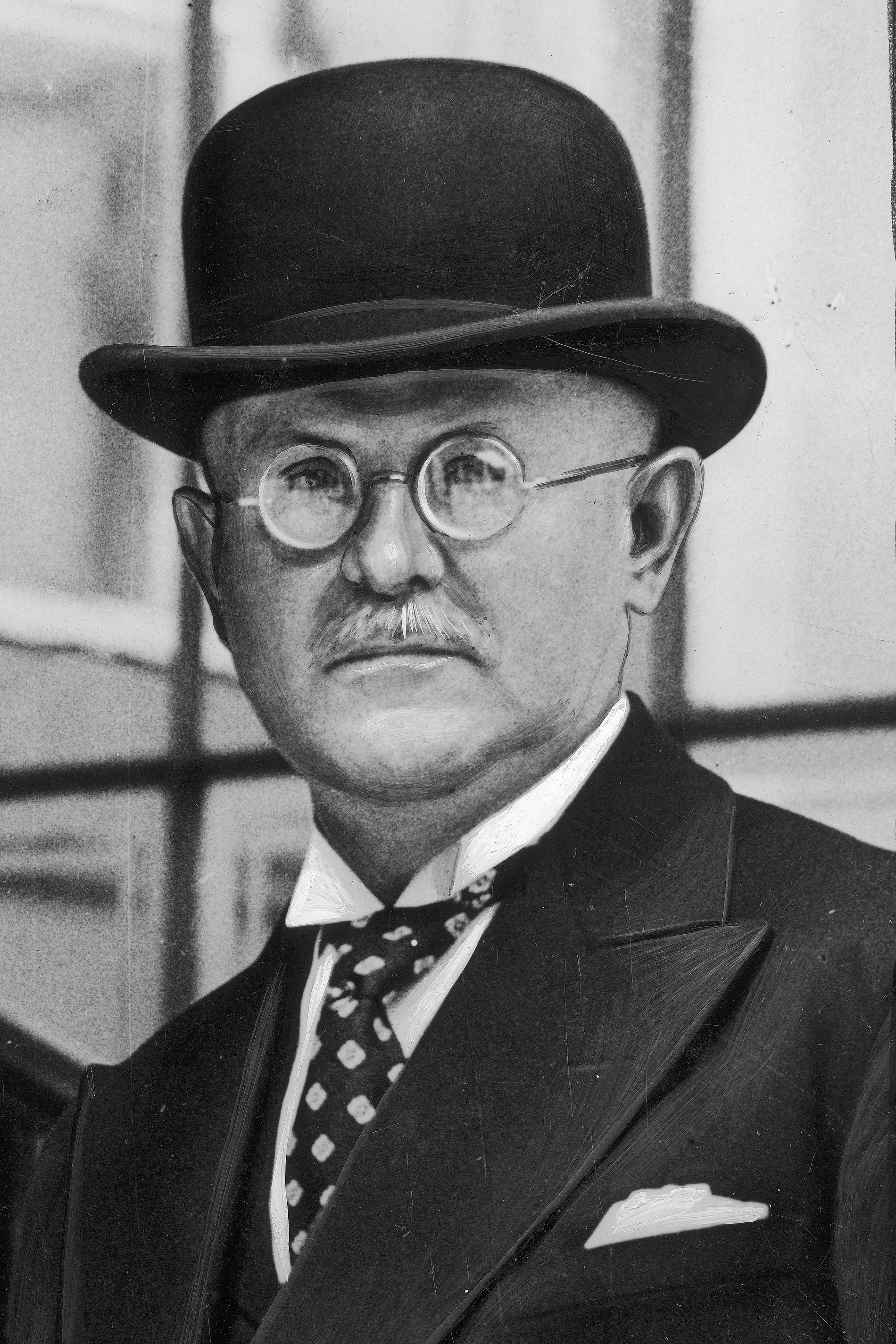
	First party	Second party	Third party
Leader	Adolf Hitler	Otto Wels; Arthur Crispien; Hans Vogel	Ernst Thälmann
Party	NSDAP	SPD	KPD
Last election	18.3%, 107 seats	24.5%, 143 seats	13.1%, 77 seats
Seats won	230	133	89
Seat change	▲123	▼10	▲12
Popular vote	13,745,680	7,959,712	5,282,636
Percentage	37.3%	21.6%	14.3%
Swing	▲19.0 pp	▼2.9 pp	▲1.2 pp
	Fourth party	Fifth party	Sixth party
Leader	Ludwig Kaas	Alfred Hugenberg	Heinrich Held
Party	Centre	DNVP	BVP
Last election	11.8%, 68 seats	7.0%, 41 seats	3.0%, 19 seats
Seats won	75	37	22
Seat change	▲7	▼4	▲3
Popular vote	4,589,430	2,178,024	1,192,684
Percentage	12.4%	5.9%	3.2%
Swing	▲0.6 pp	▼1.1 pp	▲0.2 pp
Government before election
Papen cabinet
Ind.–DNVP
Government after election
Papen cabinet
Ind.–DNVP

Federal elections were held in Germany on 31 July 1932, following the premature dissolution of the Reichstag. The Nazi Party made large gains and became the largest party in the Reichstag for the first time. The Nazi Party and the Communist Party held more than half of the seats in the Reichstag, meaning no majority coalition government could be formed without including at least one of these two parties.

== Background ==
Since 1929, Germany had been suffering from the effects of the Great Depression; unemployment had risen from 8.5% to nearly 30% between 1929 and 1932, while industrial production dropped by around 42%. Over 6 million people were unemployed in 1932, and 40% of organized labour was unemployed or working reduced hours in summer 1932.

In March 1930, the governing grand coalition of the pro-republican parties—the Social Democratic Party (SPD), the Centre Party and both liberal parties—collapsed. President Paul von Hindenburg appointed a minority government, headed by the Centre Party's Heinrich Brüning, which could only govern by using Hindenburg's emergency powers. The September 1930 elections produced a highly fragmented Reichstag, making the formation of a stable government impossible. The elections also saw the Nazi Party rise to national prominence, gaining 95 seats.

Brüning's policies, implemented via presidential decree and tolerated by parliament, failed to solve the economic crisis and weakened the parliamentary system. In March 1932, the presidential elections began as a three-way race between the incumbent Hindenburg, supported by pro-democratic parties, against Hitler on the one hand and the Communist Ernst Thälmann on the other. Hitler received around a third of the vote and was defeated in the second round in April by Hindenburg, who won a narrow majority. However, at the end of May 1932, Hindenburg was persuaded to dismiss Brüning as chancellor and replaced him with Franz von Papen, a renegade from the Centre Party, and a non-partisan "Cabinet of Barons". Papen's cabinet had almost no support in the Reichstag. Only three days after his appointment, he was faced with such opposition that he had Hindenburg dissolve the Reichstag and call new elections for 31 July so that the Reichstag could not dismiss him immediately.

== Campaign ==
Nazi membership rose from 293,000 in September 1930 to almost 1.5 million by the end of 1932. The number of newspapers controlled by the party rose from 49 in 1930 to 127 by 1932. Völkischer Beobachter's circulation rose from 26,000 in 1929 to over 100,000 in 1931.

Joseph Goebbels was placed in charge of the Nazis' propaganda and campaign in 1930. Goebbels' staff was expanded and his role formalized by the Reich Propaganda Directorate (RPL) in 1931. In prior elections the Nazis relied on membership dues, but started receiving financial support from businesses in 1932. The ban on the Sturmabteilung and Schutzstaffel was lifted by Papen, against the pleas of state governments, in exchange for Nazi tolerance of his cabinet.

The German State Party (DStP) saw its membership in the Landtag of Prussia fall from 28 to 2 after the 1932 state election. The DStP unsuccessfully attempted to form an alliance with the SPD and Centre or the German People's Party (DVP). The DVP was able to form an alliance with the German National People's Party (DNVP).

Alfred Hugenberg attempted to make the DNVP a mass movement party following poor results in the 1930 election. The party's paramilitary groups were consolidated into the Bismarck League in the hope that it could combat the SA. The DNVP supported Papen's government.

Papen hoped that the election would weaken the left and centre. On 20 July, he dissolved the Social Democratic government of Prussia and instituted martial law after clashes between Nazis and leftists in Altona. The DNVP and DVP supported the decision. Goebbels told regional leaders to not discuss Papen on 4 June, but the RPL later stated that the Nazis "refuse most strenuously to be associated with this cabinet". The Communist Party (KPD) criticized Papen's actions as a "naked fascist coup", but also criticized the SPD for not retaliating.

The Centre accused the Nazis of being a pagan movement while the Nazis accused the Centre of working with anti-religious organizations that were equal to organizations persecuting Christians in the Soviet Union and Spain.

== Results ==
The elections resulted in significant gains by the Nazi Party and it became the largest party in parliament for the first time, though it lacked an overall majority. The party's 230 of the 608 seats was the largest seat total for a party in Weimar history. However, of the 35 electoral districts, Schleswig-Holstein was the only one to give an outright majority of the vote to the Nazis.

The Nazis and KPD held over half of the seats in the Reichstag, making it impossible to form a government composed of moderates. Papen could only rely on the support of the DNVP and DVP, who only held a total of 44 seats. A vote of no confidence was put forward by the KPD and supported by 84% of the deputies. A new election was scheduled for November 1932.

Gregor Strasser attempted to form a coalition between the Nazis and Centre. The Nazis did not obstruct parliamentary procedure and in return the Centre voted to make Hermann Göring president of the Reichstag. Strasser opposed calling for a new election, fearing that support for the Nazis would decline.

Party	Votes	%	+/–	Seats	+/–
Nazi Party	13,745,680	37.27	+19.02	230	+123
Social Democratic Party	7,959,712	21.58	−2.95	133	−10
Communist Party of Germany	5,282,636	14.32	+1.19	89	+12
Centre Party	4,589,430	12.44	+0.63	75	+7
German National People's Party	2,178,024	5.91	−1.12	37	−4
Bavarian People's Party	1,192,684	3.23	+0.20	22	+3
German People's Party	436,002	1.18	−3.33	7	−23
German State Party	371,800	1.01	−2.77	4	−16
Christian Social People's Service	364,543	0.99	−1.49	3	−11
Reich Party of the German Middle Class	146,876	0.40	−3.50	2	−21
German Farmers' Party	137,133	0.37	−0.60	2	−4
Agricultural League	96,851	0.26	−0.29	2	−1
German Country People	90,554	0.25	−2.92	1	−18
Socialist Workers' Party of Germany	72,630	0.20	New	0	New
German-Hanoverian Party	46,927	0.13	−0.28	0	−3
People's Justice Party	40,825	0.11	–0.67	1	+1
Poland List	33,436	0.09	New	0	New
Kleinrentner, Inflationsgeschädigte und Vorkriegsgeldbesitzer	14,816	0.04	New	0	New
Worker and Farmer Party of Germany/Christian Radical People's Front	13,950	0.04	New	0	New
Free Economy Party of Germany	12,247	0.03	New	0	New
Farmers, House and Property Owners	9,465	0.03	New	0	New
Radical Middle Class	8,637	0.02	New	0	New
Workers' and Farmers' Struggle Community	4,551	0.01	New	0	New
Interessengemeinschaft der Kleinrentner und Inflationsgeschädigten	2,932	0.01	New	0	New
National Socialist People's Alliance for Truth and Justice	2,436	0.01	New	0	New
Handwerker, Handels- und Gewerbetreibende	2,221	0.01	New	0	New
Kriegsteilnehmer, Kriegsbeschädigte und Kriegshinterbliebene	2,213	0.01	New	0	New
Enteigneter Mittelstand	2,186	0.01	New	0	New
Gerechtigkeitsbewegung für Parteienverbot – gegen Lohn-, Gehalts- und Rentenkürzungen – für Arbeitsbeschaffung	2,035	0.01	New	0	New
German Free Economy Party	1,916	0.01	New	0	New
Deutsche Einheitspartei für wahre Volkswirtschaft, Unterstützungsempfänger- Partei Deutschlands	1,709	0.00	New	0	New
Schleswig Home	1,511	0.00	New	0	New
Partei der Unzufriedenen	1,341	0.00	New	0	New
Höchstgehalt der Beamten 5000 M. Für die Arbeitslosen und bis jetzt abgewiesenen Kriegsbeschädigten	1,141	0.00	New	0	New
German Socialist Struggle Movement	947	0.00	New	0	New
Liste gegen Kürzung der Invaliden-, Sozial- und Kriegsbeschädigtenrenten	887	0.00	New	0	New
Unemployed Front	853	0.00	New	0	New
Kampfbund gegen Hauszinssteuer	790	0.00	New	0	New
German People's Community	618	0.00	New	0	New
Schmalix Greater German List	610	0.00	–0.08	0	0
Schlesiens Handwerk und Gewerbe	598	0.00	New	0	New
Der ernste evangelisch-lutherische Christ (Gerechtigkeits-Bewegung)	587	0.00	New	0	New
Bund Bayerisches Handwerk und Gewerbe, Haus- und Grundbesitz und Landwirtschaft	577	0.00	New	0	New
Schicksalsgemeinschaft deutscher Erwerbslosen	555	0.00	New	0	New
Kampfgemeinschaft der Rentner, Sparer und Inflationsgeschädigten	532	0.00	New	0	New
Nationale Rentner, Sparer und Inflationsgeschädigte	522	0.00	New	0	New
Party of the Unemployed for Work and Bread	492	0.00	New	0	New
Freiheitliche National-Soziale Deutsche Mittelstandsbewegung	480	0.00	New	0	New
National Freedom Party of Germany	392	0.00	New	0	New
National-soziale Partei gegen die Hauszinssteuer	376	0.00	New	0	New
Kampfgemeinschaft für Handwerk, Gewerbe, Hausbesitz und Landwirtschaft	334	0.00	New	0	New
General Social-National Unity Worker Party of Germany	277	0.00	New	0	New
Freiwirtschaftsbewegung für Freiland, Freigeld, Festwährung	270	0.00	New	0	New
German Workers' Party	257	0.00	New	0	New
Nationaler Bürger- und Wirtschaftsblock	226	0.00	New	0	New
Kampfbund der Lohn- und Gehaltsabgebauten und Auslandsgeschädigten	177	0.00	New	0	New
Radical Party	154	0.00	New	0	New
Kampfgemeinschaft der Lohn- und Gehaltsabgebauten	128	0.00	New	0	New
Unitarianist Union of Germany	81	0.00	New	0	New
Mieter- und Volks-Reichspartei	69	0.00	New	0	New
German Social Monarchist Party	66	0.00	New	0	New
German Reform Party	59	0.00	New	0	New
Total	36,882,964	100.00	–	608	+31
Valid votes	36,882,964	99.25			
Invalid/blank votes	279,727	0.75			
Total votes	37,162,691	100.00			
Registered voters/turnout	44,211,216	84.06			
Source: Gonschior.de

=== Nazi Party vote share by constituency ===
Constituency	%
East Prussia	47.1%
Berlin	24.6%
Potsdam II	33.0%
Potsdam I	38.1%
Frankfurt on the Oder	48.1%
Pomerania	47.9%
Breslau	43.5%
Liegnitz	48.0%
Oppeln	29.3%
Magdeburg	43.8%
Merseburg	42.6%
Thuringen	43.4%
Schleswig-Holstein	51.0%
Weser-Ems	38.4%
East Hanover	49.5%
South Hanover-Brunswick	46.1%
North Westphalia	25.7%
South Westphalia	27.2%
Hessen-Nassau	43.6%
Cologne-Aachen	20.2%
Koblenz-Trier	28.8%
East Düsseldorf	31.6%
West Düsseldorf	27.0%
Upper Bavaria-Swabia	27.1%
Lower Bavaria	20.4%
Franconia	39.8%
Pfalz	43.7%
Dresden-Bautzen	39.3%
Leipzig	36.1%
Chemnitz-Zwickau	47.0%
Wurttemberg	30.3%
Baden	36.9%
Hessen-Darmstadt	43.1%
Hamburg	33.7%
Mecklenburg	44.8%
Total	37.3%
Source: Digi Zeit

== Aftermath ==
The Nazis and KPD held over half of the seats in the Reichstag. This made it impossible to form a government composed of moderates. Papen could only rely on the support of the DNVP and DVP, who only held a total of 44 seats. A vote of no confidence was put forward by the KPD and supported by 84% of the deputies. A new election was scheduled for November 1932.

An unofficial confidence and supply agreement was struck between Papen and the NSDAP. In exchange, Papen lifted the ban on the Nazi Sturmabteilung (SA) militia.

Papen's austerity measures were deeply unpopular with the general population, but were generally supported by Germany's elites. The government started to implement openly authoritarian measures: on 20 July 1932, the SPD-led coalition government in Prussia was overthrown in an illegal coup that placed the region under the direct control of the cabinet through a presidential decree, further weakening Weimar democracy. On 9 August, another presidential decree drastically streamlined the judicial process in death penalty cases while limiting the right of appeal. New special courts were also created.

On 11 August, Papen and his Interior Minister Baron Wilhelm von Gayl called a press conference to announce plans for a new constitution that would, in effect, turn Germany into a dictatorship. On 12 September, the Reichstag overwhelmingly passed a motion of no confidence against the cabinet in a 512–42 vote and a snap election was called by Hindenburg.

== See also ==
- Oskar Daubmann

== Works cited ==
=== Books ===
- Childers, Thomas (1983). The Nazi Voter: The Social Foundations of Fascism in Germany, 1919-1933. University of North Carolina Press. ISBN 0807815705.
- Hamilton, Richard (1982). Who Voted for Hitler?. Princeton University Press. ISBN 0691093954.
- Orlow, Dietrich (1969). The History of the Nazi Party: 1919-1933. University of Pittsburgh Press. SBN 822931834.

=== Journals ===
- Kerwin, Jerome (1932). "The German Reichstag Elections of July 31, 1932". American Political Science Review. 26 (5). American Political Science Association: 698–705. doi:10.2307/1947146. JSTOR 1947146.
- Hamilton, Richard (2003). "The Rise of Nazism: A Case Study and Review of Interpretations: Kiel, 1928-1933". German Studies Review. 26 (1). Johns Hopkins University Press: 43–62. doi:10.2307/1432901. JSTOR 1432901.
