= People's Justice Party (Germany) =

Political party in the German Weimar Republic

The Reich Party for Civil Rights and Deflation (German: Reichspartei für Volksrecht und Aufwertung), also known as the People's Justice Party (Volksrechtpartei, VRP), was a political party active in the Weimar Republic in Germany.

== History ==
The inflation crisis of 1923 sparked numerous calls for revaluation and, whilst measures to this end were introduced in 1925, they did not satisfy many advocates of the policy and so in 1926 the Sparerbund für das Deutsche Reich decided to form its own political party. The party set itself up as the defender of savers and called for the creation of as broad a middle class as possible. In contrast to the Reich Party of the German Middle Class (WP), another middle class party, it sought to represent those who were worst hit by the hyperinflation of the early 1920s, with the WP representing the property owners who had done well from the crisis. A youth movement, Posadowsky Jugendbund, was attached to the party, taking its name from the party's honorary chairman Arthur von Posadowsky-Wehner, a former Vice-Chancellor of Germany.

The party won two seats in the 1928 elections although it had three separate members of the IV. Reichstag; Georg Best (formerly of the German National People's Party and later a member of the National Socialist Freedom Movement), Paul Seiffert (initially NSFP), and Emil Roß (initially Zentrum). The party lost its parliamentary representation in the 1930 elections after losing support to the Nazi Party. Under the leadership of Adolf Bauser, the VRP entered into coalition with the Christian Social People's Service and returned to the Reichstag following the July 1932 elections, winning one seat, although they lost the seat in the November 1932 elections. Following the establishment of the Nazi regime in 1933, the VRP disappeared along with all parties outside of the Nazi Party.
