= 1928 German federal election =

- 20 May 1928

All 491 seats in the Reichstag 246 seats needed for a majority
- Registered: 41,224,678 (▲5.7%)
- Turnout: 75.6% (▼3.2pp)
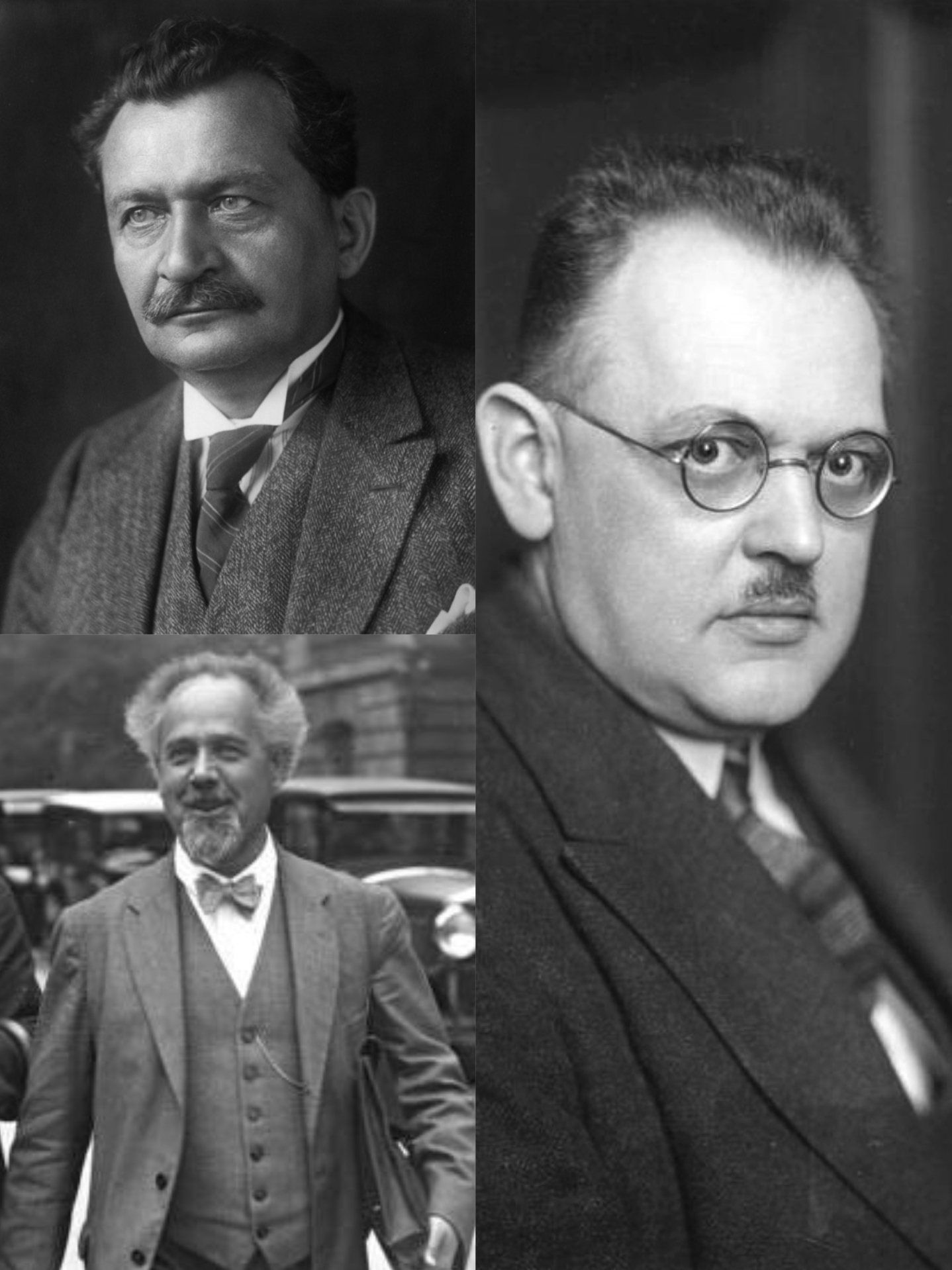

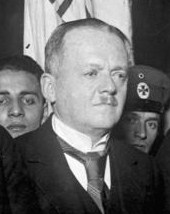

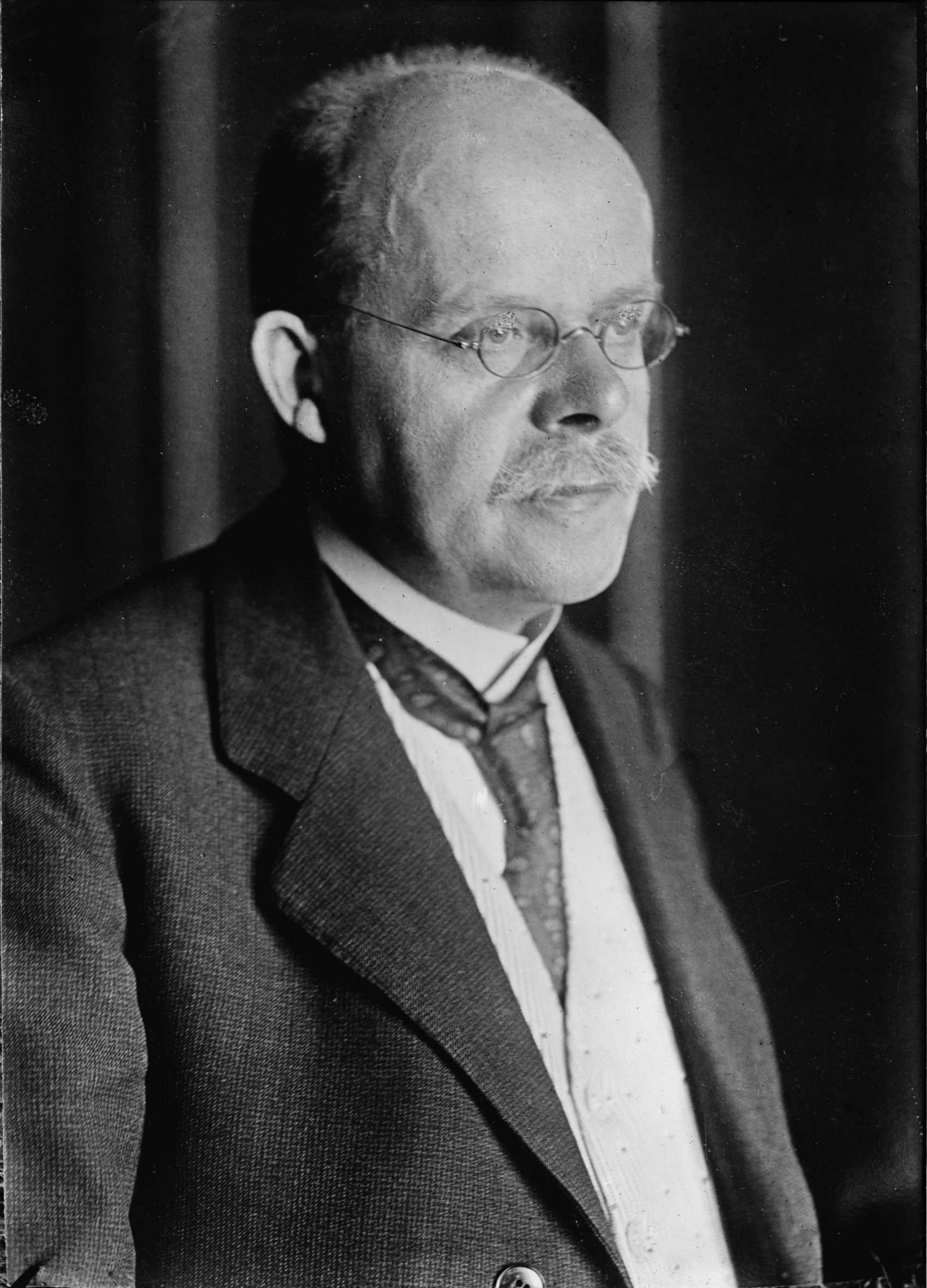

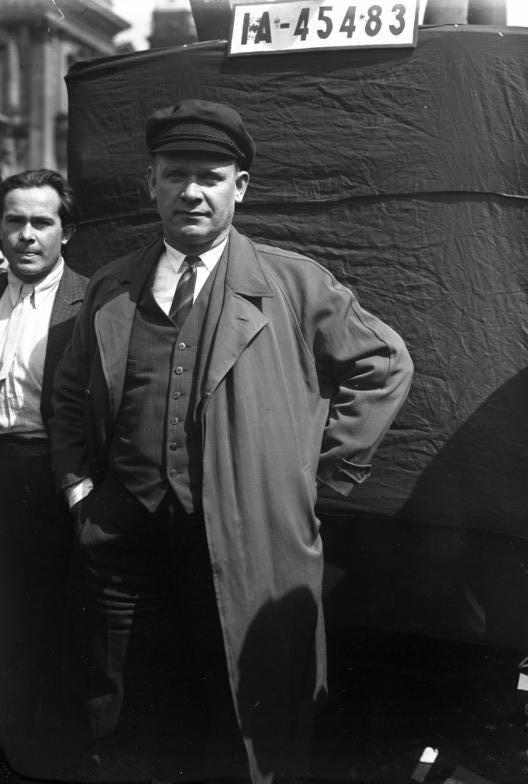

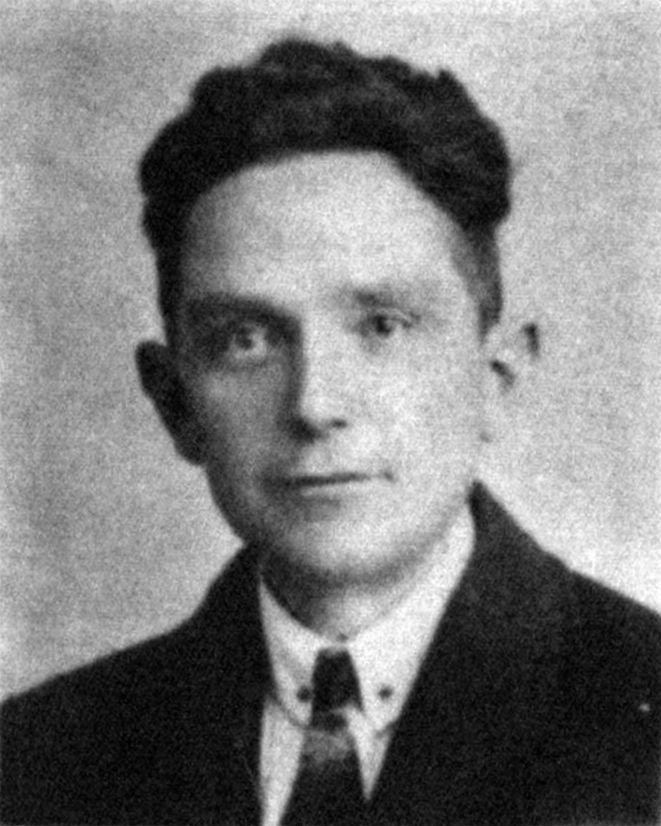

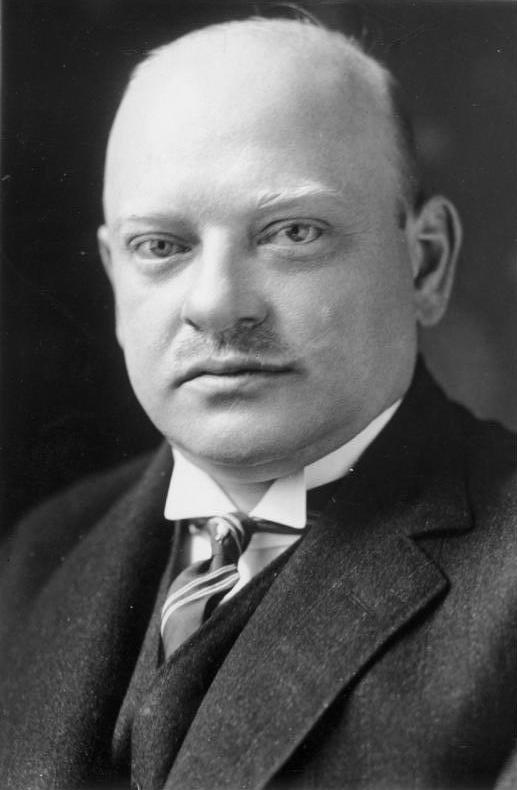

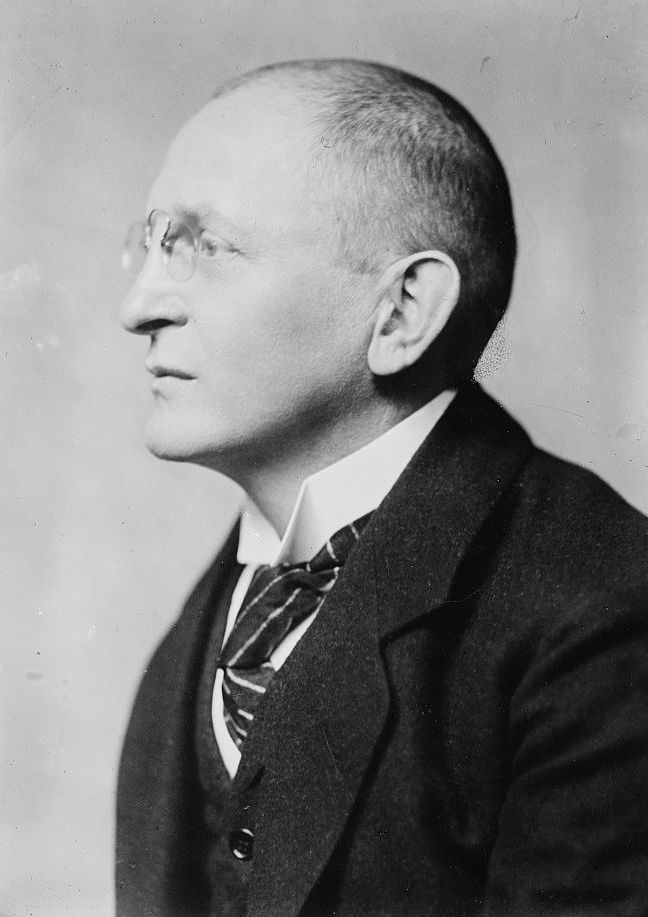
	First party	Second party	Third party
Leader	Hermann Müller; Otto Wels; Arthur Crispien	Kuno von Westarp	Wilhelm Marx
Party	SPD	DNVP	Centre
Last election	26.0%, 131 seats	20.5%, 103 seats	13.6%, 69 seats
Seats won	153	73	61
Seat change	▲22	▼30	▼8
Popular vote	9,152,979	4,381,563	3,712,152
Percentage	29.8%	14.3%	12.1%
Swing	▲3.8 pp	▼6.2 pp	▼1.5 pp
	Fourth party	Fifth party	Sixth party
Leader	Ernst Thälmann & Philipp Dengel	Gustav Stresemann	Erich Koch-Weser
Party	KPD	DVP	DDP
Last election	8.9%, 45 seats	10.1%, 51 seats	6.3%, 32 seats
Seats won	54	45	25
Seat change	▲9	▼6	▼7
Popular vote	3,264,793	2,679,703	1,479,374
Percentage	10.6%	8.7%	4.8%
Swing	▲1.7 pp	▼1.4 pp	▼1.5 pp
Government before election
Fourth Marx cabinet
Z–DNVP–DVP–BVP
Government after election
Second Müller cabinet
SPD–DVP–DDP–Z–BVP

A federal election was held in Germany on 20 May 1928 to elect the fourth Reichstag of the Weimar Republic. The election marked a significant defeat for Germany's mainstream moderate and right-wing parties, with voters shifting to special-interest parties and the Marxist left, especially the Social Democratic Party (SPD). The centre-right caretaker government of Wilhelm Marx was replaced by a centre-left grand coalition led by Hermann Müller of the SPD.

== Background ==
During the almost four years since the previous Reichstag election in December 1924, Germany had been governed by four conservative cabinets, two of which included the national-conservative German National People's Party (DNVP). None of them involved the Social Democratic Party (SPD), which had the most seats of any party in the Reichstag. The final cabinet of Wilhelm Marx of the Catholic Centre Party collapsed in February 1928 due to a dispute over education policy, and an election was called for May.

== Campaign ==
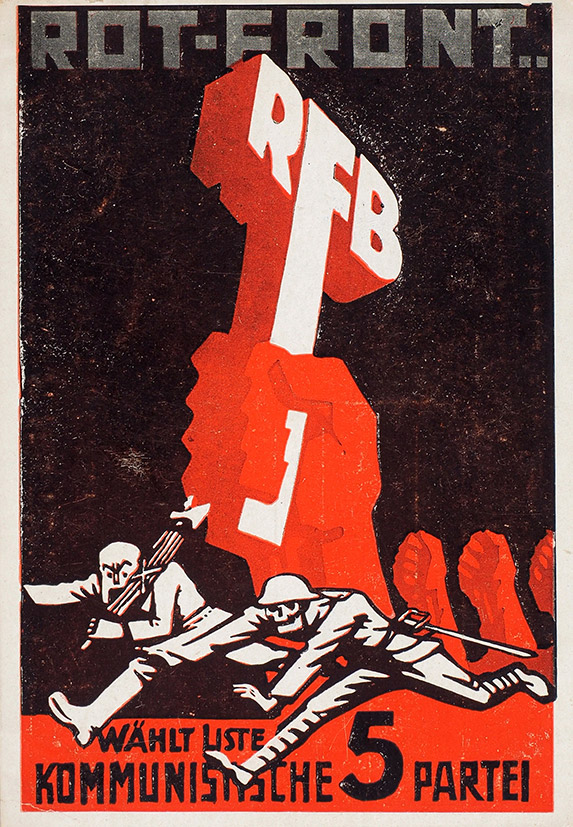
A KPD campaign poster depicting the Roter Frontkämpferbund, the party paramilitary, as a hammer coming down on fascists and militarists

In social and economic terms, the election took place at the height of the Weimar Republic's economic stabilization. The economy was developing positively and unemployment figures were lower than in previous years.

The SPD, which had not led a government since mid-1920 nor participated in a cabinet since 1923, had made it clear in its 1927 party conference in Kiel that it was ready to take over a governing role again. Along with the Communist Party of Germany (KPD), the SPD centred its campaign around opposition to expanding the German Navy. Specifically at issue was funding the construction of the armoured cruiser A, which the SPD, KPD and German Democratic Party (DDP) had argued against during the final days of the Marx cabinet. Because the majority in the Reichstag had voted to cut subsidies for school children's meals while expressing approval for funding for the ship, first the KPD and then the SPD used the slogan "Food for children instead of armoured cruisers" (Kinderspeisung statt Panzerkreuzer) in their campaigns. The DNVP primarily focused its campaigning on increasing powers for the German Presidency, while the SPD focused its campaign on anti-remilitarization and pacifism.

The Centre Party saw no possibility of pushing through its denominational school law in a centre-left coalition. The DDP, besides criticizing the naval expansion, advocated a grand coalition. The German People's Party (DVP) relied on the popularity of Foreign Minister and party leader Gustav Stresemann in the election campaign. He, too, thought that there was no reasonable alternative to a grand coalition. In the power struggle that had been taking place at the top of the DNVP since 1927, the extreme faction led by the pan-German publisher Alfred Hugenberg had gained more and more influence, and the party sought to win back or retain voters who had been disappointed by its radicalism. The NSDAP had consolidated its position on the extreme right.

=== Bavaria ===
In Lower Bavaria, and especially in rural areas within Lower Bavaria, campaigning centered around the rivalry between the Bavarian People's Party (BVP) and the Bavarian Peasants' League. This made it difficult for the Bavarian Nazis to arouse interest there. Ultimately, the Peasants' League performed well, increasing their votes as part of the larger German Farmers' Party, while the BVP struggled and lost two seats.

The DVP had never managed to win a seat in Bavaria due to being seen as too Prussian. In an attempt to remedy this, Stresemann placed himself at the head of the party's electoral list of Upper Bavaria-Swabia.

== Electoral system ==
The Reichstag was elected via party list proportional representation. For this purpose, the country was divided into 35 multi-member electoral districts. A party was entitled to a seat for every 60,000 votes won. This was calculated via a three-step process on the constituency level, an intermediate level which combined multiple constituencies, and finally nationwide, where all parties' excess votes were combined. In the third nationwide step, parties could not be awarded more seats than they had already won on the two lower constituency levels. Due to the fixed number of votes per seat, the size of the Reichstag fluctuated between elections based on the number of voters.

The voting age was 20 years. People who were incapacitated according to the Civil Code, who were under guardianship or provisional guardianship, or who had lost their civil rights after a criminal court ruling were not eligible to vote.

== Results ==
The results were a defeat for the parties of the ruling centre-right. The DNVP particularly suffered, falling to 14% of the vote and losing 30 seats. The German Democratic Party and the conservative German People's Party had more modest losses of seven and six seats respectively. The Catholic Centre Party, which lost eight seats, saw a decline in its Reichstag membership for the first time since 1920.

The winners of the election were the parties of the left. The SPD, in opposition since 1923, won 30% of the vote, up 5.5% since the previous election. The Communist Party also improved, to 10.6% from 8.9%. Much of the bourgeois and conservative electorate turned to small parties representing special interests, including the Reich Party of the German Middle Class (Economic Party) with 23 seats, the Christian National Peasants' and Farmers' Party (Landvolk Party) with 9 seats and the Reich Party for Civil Rights and Deflation (People's Justice Party) with 2 seats.

Party	Votes	%	+/–	Seats	+/–
Social Democratic Party	9,152,979	29.76	+3.74	153	+22
German National People's Party	4,381,563	14.25	−6.24	73	−30
Centre Party	3,712,152	12.07	−1.53	61	−8
Communist Party of Germany	3,264,793	10.62	+1.68	54	+9
German People's Party	2,679,703	8.71	−1.36	45	−6
German Democratic Party	1,479,374	4.81	−1.53	25	−7
Reich Party of the German Middle Class	1,387,602	4.51	+2.22	23	+11
Bavarian People's Party	945,644	3.07	−0.67	17	−2
Nazi Party	810,127	2.63	−0.37	12	−2
Christian-National Peasants' and Farmers' Party	571,891	1.86	New	9	New
Reich Party for Civil Rights and Deflation	509,471	1.66	New	2	New
German Farmers' Party	481,254	1.56	New	8	New
Völkisch-National Bloc	266,370	0.87	New	0	New
Agricultural League	199,548	0.65	−1.00	3	−5
German-Hanoverian Party	195,555	0.64	−0.22	4	0
Saxon Peasants	127,700	0.42	New	2	New
Christian Social Reich Party	110,704	0.36	New	0	New
Left Communists	80,405	0.26	New	0	New
Old Social Democratic Party of Germany	65,775	0.21	New	0	New
Polish People's Party	64,753	0.21	−0.06	0	0
Evangelical Party of Germany	52,488	0.17	New	0	New
German Social Party	46,047	0.15	−0.38	0	0
General People's Party	37,373	0.12	New	0	New
German House and Property Owners' Party	35,846	0.12	New	0	New
Independent Social Democratic Party	20,815	0.07	−0.26	0	0
Evangelical Community Spirit	10,709	0.03	New	0	New
Christian National Middle Class Party	9,957	0.03	New	0	New
Pastor Greber Party	9,527	0.03	New	0	New
Revaluation and Construction Party	8,562	0.03	New	0	New
German Reich Bloc of the Injured	7,437	0.02	New	0	New
Reich Party for Crafts, Trade and Business	6,614	0.02	New	0	New
People's Welfare Party	6,071	0.02	New	0	New
Franconian Peasants	3,417	0.01	New	0	New
Wendish People's Party	3,111	0.01	−0.01	0	0
Party for Justice and Tenant Protection	2,831	0.01	New	0	New
Schleswig Club	2,435	0.01	−0.01	0	0
German Christian Folk Party	901	0.00	New	0	New
Vital Interests of the Unmarried	873	0.00	New	0	New
Masurian People's Party	295	0.00	New	0	New
Lithuanian People's Party	289	0.00	New	0	New
Friesland	286	0.00	New	0	New
Total	30,753,247	100.00	–	491	–2
Valid votes	30,753,247	98.68			
Invalid/blank votes	412,542	1.32			
Total votes	31,165,789	100.00			
Registered voters/turnout	41,224,678	75.60			
Source: Gonschior.de

== Aftermath ==
The Centre Party's and Bavarian People's Party's performance in the election raised long-term concerns over their futures. The parties had suffered heavy losses but more importantly the parties' historic dominance over the Catholic vote had further diminished, falling from a historic high of 85% in 1870 to 55% in 1912 to only 48% in the 1928 election. This percentage had been increased by the passage of women's suffrage after World War I, with only 39% of male Catholic voters supporting the parties in the election. The two parties' losses came from several places: middle class voters had defected to the Economic Party, workers in Westphalia and the Rhineland had defected to the SPD, and they had lost support among rural voters. But they all underscored the fundamental problem that an ever increasing proportion of German Catholics were prioritizing their economic interests over their religious identity.

With a strong left wing and splintered right, there was little alternative to a government led by the SPD. Social Democrat Hermann Müller, who had served briefly as chancellor in 1920, was charged with forming a new cabinet. The only viable majority was a Great Coalition stretching from the SPD to the DVP. Negotiations proved difficult: President Hindenburg was required to use heavy-handed tactics to force the creation of the government and it took two weeks for the cabinet to be formed and sworn in, and then only as a "cabinet of personalities" rather than a formal coalition. It included ministers from the SPD, DVP, DDP and Bavarian People's Party (BVP). The Centre sent only one minister, Theodor von Guérard, as a so-called "observer". It was not until ten months later, in April 1929, that a coalition agreement could be signed and the Centre Party officially entered the cabinet.

The second Müller cabinet was the final democratic government of the Weimar Republic. Its fall in March 1930 marked the end of the parliamentary system and the beginning of the presidential cabinets that preceded the Nazi takeover in 1933.

== See also ==
- Members of the 4th German Reichstag (Weimar Republic)

== Works cited ==
- Childers, Thomas (1983). The Nazi Voter: The Social Foundations of Fascism in Germany, 1919-1933. University of North Carolina Press. ISBN 0807815705.
- Hamilton, Richard (1982). Who Voted for Hitler?. Princeton University Press. ISBN 0691093954.
- Orlow, Dietrich (1969). The History of the Nazi Party: 1919-1933. University of Pittsburgh Press. SBN 822931834.
- Pollock, James (1928). "The German Elections of 1928". American Political Science Review. 22 (3). American Political Science Association: 698–705. doi:10.2307/1945624. JSTOR 1945624.
- Pridham, Geoffrey (1973). Hitler’s Rise to Power: The Nazi Movement in Bavaria, 1923-1933. New York: Harper & Row. ISBN 978-0-061-36116-6.
