= German Farmers' Party =

German political party

The German Farmers' Party (German: Deutsche Bauernpartei, or DBP) or German Peasants' Party was a German agrarian political party during the Weimar Republic, existing from 1928–33. It has been characterised as part of a wider attempt by the middle classes to assert their economic interests in the mid to late 1920s by founding their own, fairly narrowly based, parties, including the Christian-National Peasants' and Farmers' Party and in urban areas the Reich Party for Civil Rights and Deflation and Reich Party of the German Middle Class. The party was banned and made illegal by the ruling NSDAP in 1933.
