= List of German defence ministers =

Federal Minister of Defence
- Bundesminister der Verteidigung
- Coat of arms

- State flag

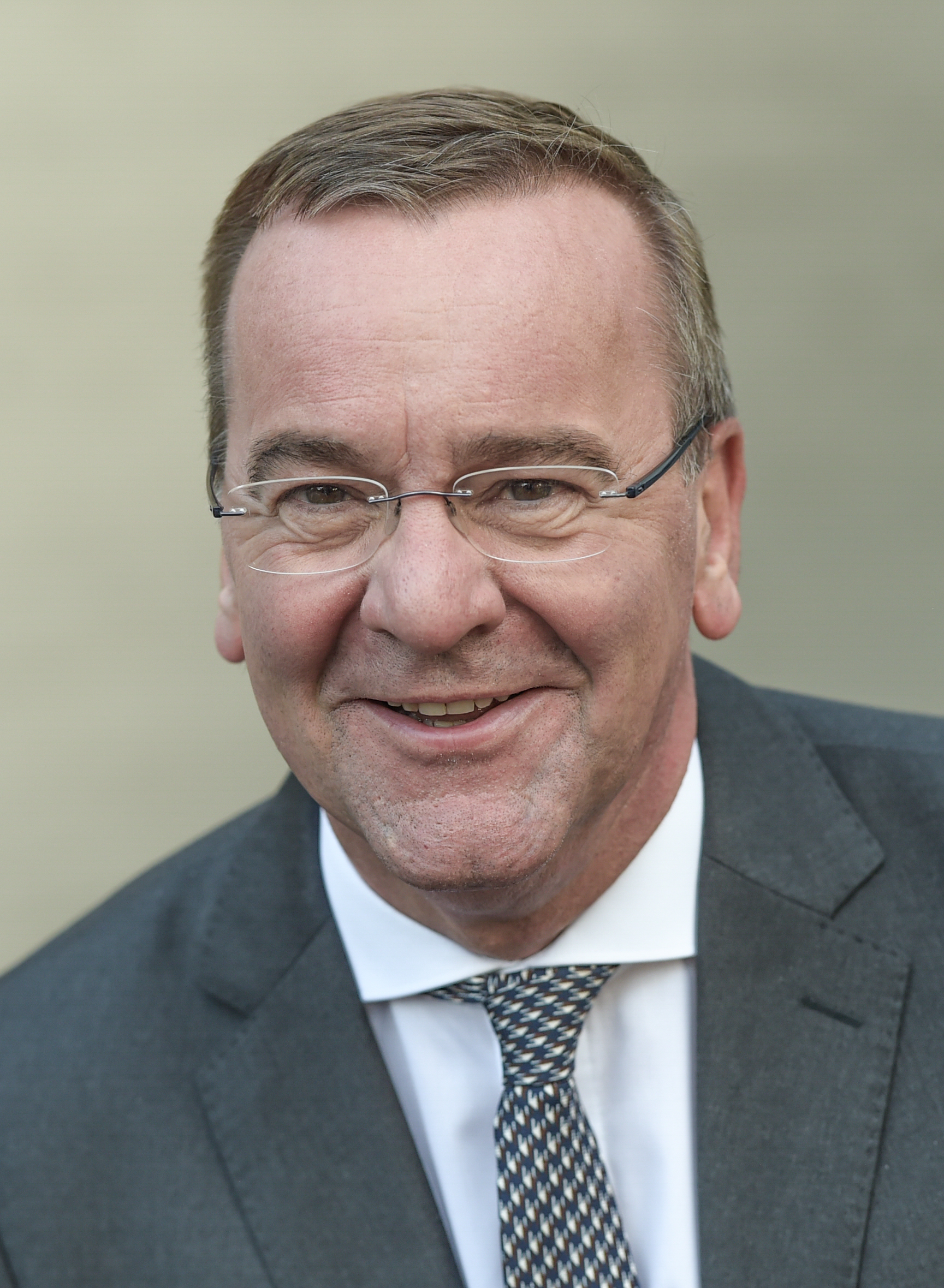
- Incumbent; Boris Pistorius since 19 January 2023
- Federal Ministry of Defence
- Reports to: The federal chancellor
- Appointer: The president, upon advice of the federal chancellor
- Formation: 13 February 1919
- First holder: Gustav Noske (Weimar Republic); Theodor Blank (Federal Republic of Germany)
- Website: bmvg.de

The federal minister of defence (German: Bundesminister der Verteidigung) is the head of the Federal Ministry of Defence and a member of the Federal Cabinet.

According to Article 65a of the German Constitution (German: Grundgesetz), the federal minister of defence is commander-in-chief (German: Inhaber der Befehls- und Kommandogewalt) of the German armed forces, the Bundeswehr, in peacetime. Conversely, when a state of defence is declared, the federal chancellor becomes commander-in-chief. The highest-ranking military officer in the Bundeswehr is the Inspector General of the Bundeswehr (German: Generalinspekteur der Bundeswehr).

The current Federal Minister of Defence is Boris Pistorius, since 19 January 2023.

== List of officeholders ==
=== German Reich (1871–1945) ===
Ministers of defence (1919–1935)

Political party: SPD DDP NSDAP

No.	Portrait	Minister of Defence	Took office	Left office	Time in office	Party	Cabinet
1	Gustav Noske	Gustav Noske (1868–1946)	13 February 1919	22 March 1920	1 year, 38 days	SPD	Scheidemann; Bauer
2	Otto Gessler	Otto Gessler (1875–1955)	27 March 1920	19 January 1928	7 years, 298 days	DDP	Müller I Fehrenbach; Wirth I−II; Cuno; Stresemann I−II; Marx I−II; Luther I−II; Marx III−IV
3	Wilhelm Groener	Wilhelm Groener (1867–1939)	19 January 1928	30 May 1932	4 years, 132 days	Independent	Marx IV; Müller II; Brüning I−II
4	Kurt von Schleicher	Kurt von Schleicher (1882–1934)	1 June 1932	28 January 1933	243 days	Independent	Papen; Schleicher
5	Werner von Blomberg	Werner von Blomberg (1878–1946)	29 January 1933	21 May 1935	2 years, 112 days	Independent	Schleicher; Hitler

Minister of war (1935–1938)

No.	Portrait	Minister of War	Took office	Left office	Time in office	Party	Cabinet
1	Werner von Blomberg	Werner von Blomberg (1878–1946)	21 May 1935	27 January 1938	2 years, 251 days	Independent	Hitler

In 1938 the Ministry of War was abolished and replaced by the Oberkommando der Wehrmacht (OKW), as a result of the Blomberg–Fritsch affair.

Chiefs of the OKW (de facto ministers of war, 1938–1945)

No.	Portrait	Chief of the OKW	Took office	Left office	Time in office	Party	Cabinet
1	Wilhelm Keitel	Wilhelm Keitel (1882–1946)	4 February 1938	13 May 1945	7 years, 98 days	Independent	Hitler; Goebbels; Schwerin von Krosigk
2	Alfred Jodl	Alfred Jodl (1890–1946)	13 May 1945	23 May 1945	10 days	Independent	Schwerin von Krosigk

Minister of war (1945)

No.	Portrait	Minister of War	Took office	Left office	Time in office	Party	Cabinet
1	Karl Dönitz	Karl Dönitz (1891–1980)	30 April 1945	23 May 1945	23 days	NSDAP	Goebbels; Schwerin von Krosigk

Karl Dönitz was named as Minister of War in Hitler's testament.

=== German Democratic Republic (1949–1990) ===
Ministers of defence (1956–1990)

Political party: SED DA

No.	Portrait	Minister of Defence	Took office	Left office	Time in office	Party	Chairman
1	Willi Stoph	Willi Stoph (1914–1999)	1 March 1956	14 July 1960	4 years, 135 days	SED	Grotewohl
2	Heinz Hoffmann	Heinz Hoffmann (1910–1985)	14 July 1960	2 December 1985 †	25 years, 141 days	SED	Grotewohl; Stoph; Sindermann; Stoph
3	Heinz Kessler	Heinz Kessler (1920–2017)	3 December 1985	18 November 1989	3 years, 351 days	SED	Stoph; Modrow
4	Theodor Hoffmann	Theodor Hoffmann (1935–2018)	18 November 1989	12 April 1990	145 days	SED	Modrow
5	Rainer Eppelmann	Rainer Eppelmann (born 1943)	12 April 1990	2 October 1990	173 days	DA	de Maizière

=== Federal Republic of Germany (1949–present) ===
Ministers of defence (Bundesminister der Verteidigung), since 1955

Political party: CDU CSU SPD

No.	Portrait	Name	Took office	Left office	Time in office	Party	Cabinet
1	Theodor Blank	Theodor Blank (1905–1972)	7 June 1955	16 October 1956	1 year, 131 days	CDU	Adenauer II
2	Franz Josef Strauss	Franz Josef Strauss (1915–1988)	16 October 1956	9 January 1963	6 years, 85 days	CSU	Adenauer II–V
3	Kai-Uwe von Hassel	Kai-Uwe von Hassel (1913–1997)	9 January 1963	1 December 1966	3 years, 326 days	CDU	Erhard I–II
4	Gerhard Schröder	Gerhard Schröder (1910–1989)	1 December 1966	21 October 1969	2 years, 324 days	CDU	Kiesinger I
5	Helmut Schmidt	Helmut Schmidt (1918–2015)	22 October 1969	7 July 1972	2 years, 259 days	SPD	Brandt I
6	Georg Leber	Georg Leber (1920–2012)	7 July 1972	16 February 1978	5 years, 224 days	SPD	Brandt I–II; Schmidt I–II
7	Hans Apel	Hans Apel (1932–2011)	17 February 1978	1 October 1982	4 years, 226 days	SPD	Schmidt II–III
8	Manfred Wörner	Manfred Wörner (1934–1994)	4 October 1982	18 May 1988	5 years, 227 days	CDU	Kohl I–II–III
9	Rupert Scholz	Rupert Scholz (born 1937)	18 May 1988	21 April 1989	338 days	CDU	Kohl III
10	Gerhard Stoltenberg	Gerhard Stoltenberg (1928–2001)	21 April 1989	31 March 1992	2 years, 345 days	CDU	Kohl III–IV
11	Volker Rühe	Volker Rühe (born 1942)	1 April 1992	26 October 1998	6 years, 188 days	CDU	Kohl IV–V
12	Rudolf Scharping	Rudolf Scharping (born 1947)	27 October 1998	19 July 2002	3 years, 265 days	SPD	Schröder I
13	Peter Struck	Peter Struck (1943–2012)	19 July 2002	22 November 2005	3 years, 126 days	SPD	Schröder II
14	Franz Josef Jung	Franz Josef Jung (born 1949)	22 November 2005	28 October 2009	3 years, 340 days	CDU	Merkel I
15	Karl-Theodor zu Guttenberg	Karl-Theodor zu Guttenberg (born 1971)	28 October 2009	3 March 2011	1 year, 126 days	CSU	Merkel II
16	Thomas de Maizière	Thomas de Maizière (born 1954)	3 March 2011	17 December 2013	2 years, 289 days	CDU	Merkel II
17	Ursula von der Leyen	Ursula von der Leyen (born 1958)	17 December 2013	17 July 2019	5 years, 212 days	CDU	Merkel III–IV
18	Annegret Kramp-Karrenbauer	Annegret Kramp-Karrenbauer (born 1962)	17 July 2019	8 December 2021	2 years, 144 days	CDU	Merkel IV
19	Christine Lambrecht	Christine Lambrecht (born 1965)	8 December 2021	19 January 2023	1 year, 42 days	SPD	Scholz
20	Boris Pistorius	Boris Pistorius (born 1960)	19 January 2023	Incumbent	3 years, 265 days	SPD	Scholz; Merz
