= Papen cabinet =

1932 cabinet of Weimar Germany

Cabinet of Franz von Papen
- 19th Cabinet of Weimar Germany
- 1 June 1932 – 17 November 1932 (until 3 December 1932 as caretaker government)
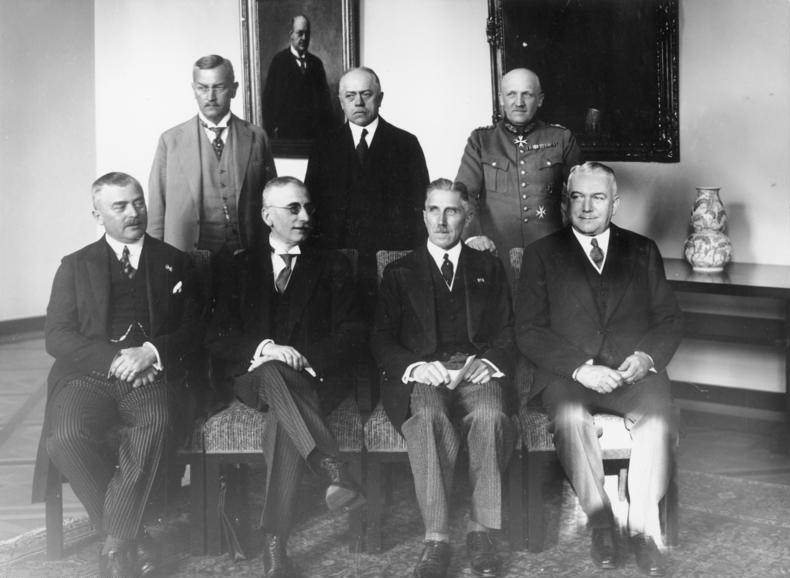
- Members of the cabinet
- Date formed: 1 June 1932
- Date dissolved: 3 December 1932 (6 months and 2 days)

People and organisations
- President: Paul von Hindenburg
- Chancellor: Franz von Papen
- Member party: German National People's Party
- Status in legislature: Minority Presidential Cabinet
- Opposition parties: Nazi Party; Social Democratic Party; Communist Party of Germany; Centre Party; Bavarian People's Party; German State Party

History
- Election: July 1932 federal election
- Legislature term: 6th Reichstag of the Weimar Republic
- Predecessor: Second Brüning cabinet
- Successor: Schleicher cabinet

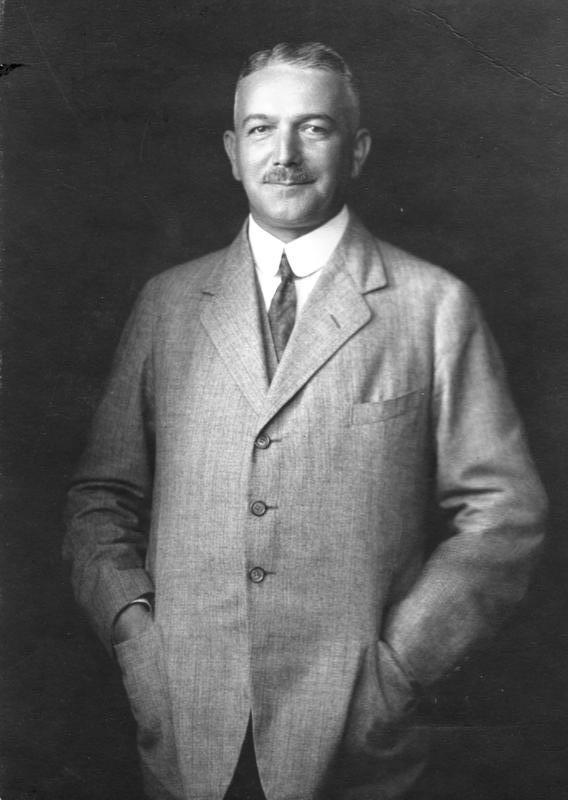
Konstantin von Neurath (Ind.), Minister of Foreign Affairs

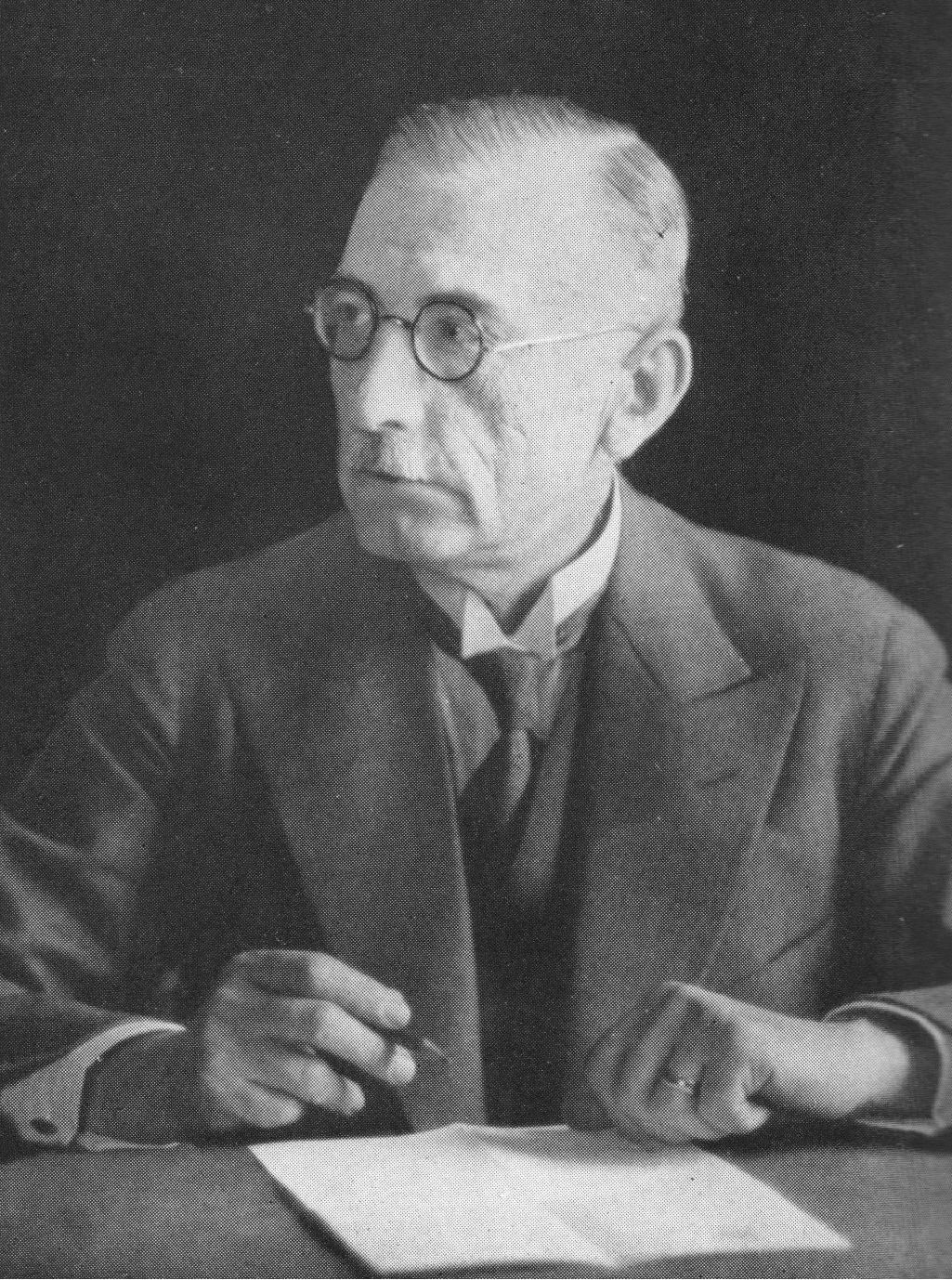
Wilhelm Freiherr von Gayl (DNVP), Minister of the Interior

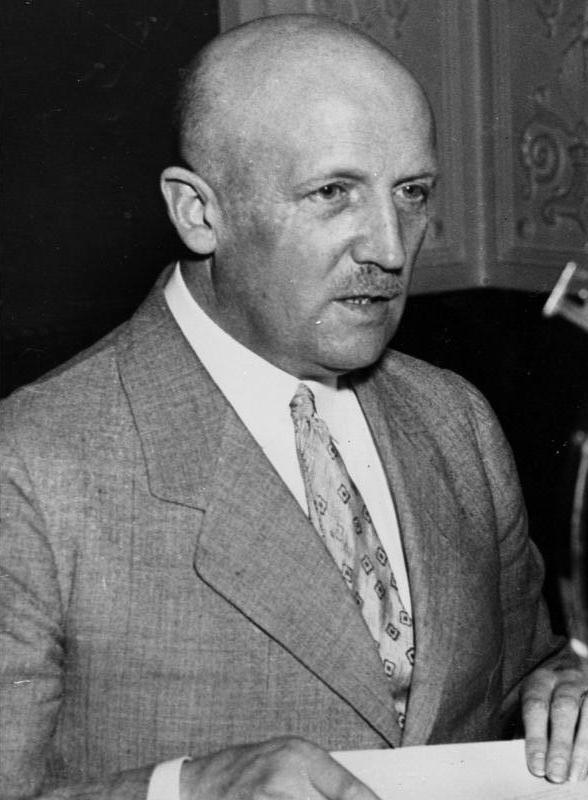
Kurt von Schleicher (Ind.), Reichswehr Minister

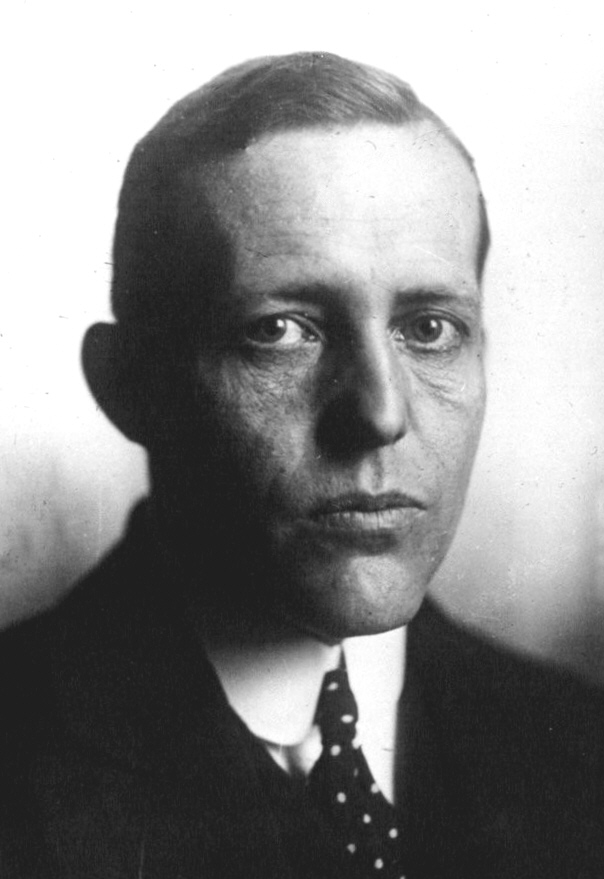
Lutz Graf Schwerin von Krosigk (Ind.), Minister of Finance

The Papen cabinet, also known as the "Barons' cabinet", headed by the independent Franz von Papen, was the nineteenth government of the Weimar Republic. It took office on 1 June 1932 when it replaced the second Brüning cabinet, which had resigned the same day after it lost the confidence of President Paul von Hindenburg.

Papen's cabinet, made up of right-wing independents and members of the German National People's Party (DNVP), was a continuation of the presidential cabinets that had begun under Heinrich Brüning. It governed using emergency decrees issued by Hindenburg that bypassed the participation of the Reichstag. In the Papen government's most dramatic move, Hindenburg allowed Papen to oust the elected government of the state of Prussia and name himself Prussian Reich commissioner, an action that was a significant step in the weakening of the Weimar Republic's democratic foundations.

In November 1932, following the second Reichstag election in less than a year, Hindenburg lost faith in Papen. Papen's cabinet formally resigned on 17 November 1932, but it continued in office in a caretaker capacity until Hindenburg replaced it on 3 December with the cabinet of his close aide General Kurt von Schleicher.

== End of the Brüning cabinet ==
Papen's predecessor as chancellor, Heinrich Brüning, had been unable to build a stable ruling coalition in the Reichstag in order to pass the deflationary austerity measures that he thought were necessary to combat the effects of the Great Depression on the German economy. With the support of President Paul von Hindenburg, Brüning governed using the emergency decrees authorized in Article 48 of the Weimar Constitution. The worsening economy and his growing unpopularity among the people of Germany, combined with a number of policy differences with Hindenburg, caused him to lose the President's confidence by early 1932. At the urging of Reichswehr General Kurt von Schleicher and other close advisors, Hindenburg replaced him with von Papen.

== Appointment and cabinet formation ==
Papen, then of the Catholic Centre Party, had come to Schleicher's attention as a candidate for chancellor through an article he wrote for the newspaper Der Ring in which he called for building a "genuinely conservative state-bloc" to fight the chaos to which he said Germany had been brought by the Weimar democracy.

The Centre Party's leadership let Papen know that if he were offered the chancellorship and replaced Brüning (also of the Centre Party), they would oppose him. As a result of the objections, Papen initially wanted to turn down Hindenburg's offer, but the President appealed to his patriotic sense of duty and habit of soldierly obedience. Papen let himself be convinced and resigned from the Centre Party the day before he took office.

Even though he had been a member of the Prussian Landtag and had contacts among monarchists, the military and leading men of business, Papen had no political following. His appointment as chancellor came as a total surprise to most of the German public. In the Reichstag he had the support only of the nationalist and conservative German National People's Party (DNVP) and German People's Party (DVP).

Papen's cabinet was formed all but exclusively on Schleicher's personnel suggestions. When Schleicher heard the complaint that Papen was no head for the government, he is said to have responded, "He isn't supposed to be one. But he is a hat." Papen's government became known as the "Cabinet of Barons", a name first used by Vorwärts, the newspaper of the Social Democratic Party (SPD), in its headline about the new government on 1 June 1932. Six of the cabinet's members were from the nobility and only three were commoners. The leading figure among them was Reichswehr Minister von Schleicher, who had been politically active behind the scenes for years. He became widely known to the public only when he took the position in Papen's cabinet.

The cabinet primarily backed the interests of military leadership and the Junker owners of large agricultural estates east of the Elbe. Industrialists were represented only secondarily and workers and the middle classes not at all. In the widespread belief that the cabinet would be worse than the Brüning cabinet at managing the economic crisis, the German stock market fell when its members were announced .

== Members ==
The cabinet consisted of the following ministers:

Portfolio	Minister	Took office	Left office	Party
Chancellorship	Franz von Papen	1 June 1932	3 December 1932	Independent
Vice-Chancellorship	Vacant	–	–	–
Foreign Affairs	Konstantin von Neurath	1 June 1932	3 December 1932	Independent
Interior	Wilhelm von Gayl	1 June 1932	3 December 1932	DNVP
Justice	Franz Gürtner	1 June 1932	3 December 1932	DNVP
Labour	Hermann Warmbold (acting)	1 June 1932	6 June 1932	Independent
Labour	Hugo Schäffer	6 June 1932	3 December 1932	Independent
Reichswehr	Kurt von Schleicher	1 June 1932	3 December 1932	Independent
Economic Affairs	Hermann Warmbold	1 June 1932	3 December 1932	Independent
Finance	Lutz Graf Schwerin von Krosigk	1 June 1932	3 December 1932	Independent
Food and Agriculture	Magnus von Braun	1 June 1932	3 December 1932	DNVP
Transport and Postal Affairs	Paul Freiherr von Eltz-Rübenach	1 June 1932	3 December 1932	Independent
Without portfolio	Franz Bracht	29 October 1932	3 December 1932	Independent
Without portfolio	Johannes Popitz	29 October 1932	3 December 1932	Independent

== Policy statement ==
Plans for a change to an authoritarian constitution had been taking shape among Hindenburg's close advisors before Papen's chancellorship. Papen himself had developed ideas for a "New State" that would combine the offices of chancellor and Prussian minister president, free the chancellor from dependence on the confidence of the Reichstag, and create an aristocratic upper house of parliament whose members would be appointed by the president. The plan had obvious similarities to the former German Empire and was intended to lead towards a restoration of the monarchy.

Papen's inaugural policy statement, which was the first that was broadcast over the radio instead of being delivered in person in front of the Reichstag, did not mention the plans for his new state but did unmistakably outline his government's general direction. Rather than proposing any specific measures, Papen accused previous Weimar governments of mismanaging the parliamentary democracy. Through a continually increasing state socialism, he said, the governments had tried to turn Germany into a sort of welfare institution. He contrasted the moral erosion of the German people, which had been exacerbated by an "unholy class war" and amplified by cultural Bolshevism, to the enduring basis of the Christian worldview. In his belief, liberal individualism and the egalitarian solidarity of the Left had brought the German body politic to the edge of an abyss. He ended by saying that his planned dissolution of the Reichstag would result in "the nation being faced with a clear and unambiguous decision as to the forces it is willing to follow on the path to the future. The government, independent of parties, will lead the struggle for the spiritual and economic recovery of the nation, for the rebirth of the new Germany."

The Vorwärts newspaper of the SPD called it a "unique declaration of class war from above":

We will counter it with a declaration of class war from below. The battle between the barons and the people must be fought! Only when this haughty supremacy is finally conquered will a true community of the people be possible. The government that issued the declaration is a government after Hitler's heart. The barons want the National Socialists to be elected! Give them the answer that they deserve.

== Presidential government ==
Per a prior agreement with Hindenburg and Hitler, Papen dissolved the Reichstag on 4 June 1932 and called for new elections in the hope that the Nazi Party would win the most seats and allow him to set up an authoritarian government. On 16 June he lifted the ban on the Nazi Sturmabteilung (SA) and Schutzstaffel (SS) that had been imposed on 13 April under the Brüning government. Using the political violence that took place during the election campaign as a pretext, he ousted the SPD-led coalition government of Prussia in the so-called Prussian coup d'état (Preußenschlag) of 20 July and by emergency decree declared himself Reich commissioner of Prussia, a step that further weakened the democracy of the Weimar Republic and fulfilled one of the goals of his "New State".

In the July 1932 elections, the Nazi Party won 37% of the vote to the SPD's 22%. When the new Reichstag assembled on 12 September, Papen attempted to put an end to the growing alliance between the Nazis and the Centre Party. By two decrees from Hindenburg, Papen dissolved the Reichstag and suspended elections beyond the constitutionally mandated 60 days. The Communist Party presented a motion of no confidence in the government, and when it passed, Papen again called for new elections.

== Dismissal ==
Following the November 1932 elections in which the Nazi Party's share of the vote slipped to 33%, Papen, under pressure from Schleicher, resigned on 17 November and formed a caretaker government. He told his cabinet that he planned to declare martial law, which would allow him to rule as a dictator. Realising that Schleicher was moving to replace him, Papen asked Hindenburg to dismiss Schleicher as Reichswehr minister. Hindenburg instead appointed Schleicher chancellor on 3 December 1932.
