= Schleicher cabinet =

1932–33 cabinet of Weimar Germany

Cabinet of Kurt von Schleicher
- 20th Cabinet of Weimar Germany
- 3 December 1932 – 30 January 1933
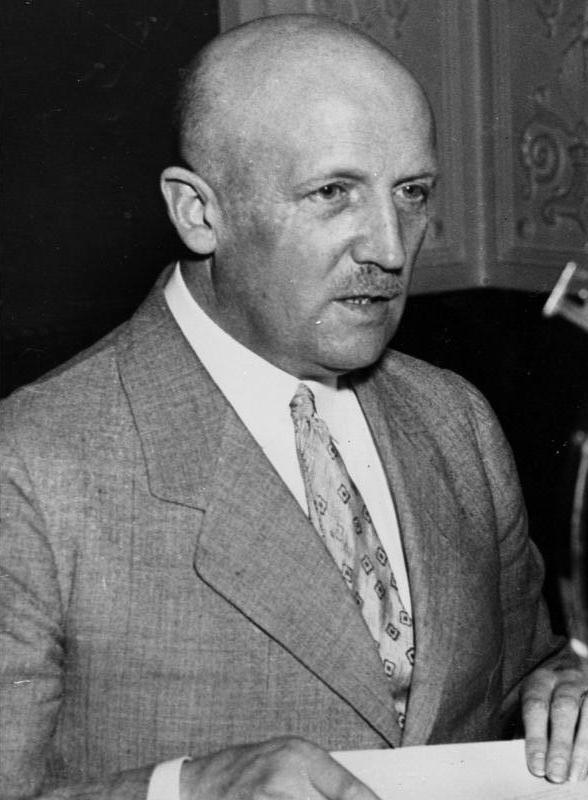
- Chancellor Kurt von Schleicher
- Date formed: 3 December 1932
- Date dissolved: 30 January 1933 (1 month, 3 weeks and 6 days)

People and organisations
- President: Paul von Hindenburg
- Chancellor: Kurt von Schleicher
- Member parties: German National People's Party
- Status in legislature: Minority Presidential Cabinet
- Opposition parties: Nazi Party; Social Democratic Party; Communist Party; Centre Party; Bavarian People's Party; German People's Party

History
- Election: November 1932 federal election
- Legislature term: 7th Reichstag of the Weimar Republic
- Predecessor: Papen cabinet
- Successor: Hitler cabinet

The Schleicher cabinet, headed by Chancellor Kurt von Schleicher, was the 20th government of the Weimar Republic. Schleicher assumed office on 3 December 1932 after he had pressured his predecessor, Franz von Papen, to resign. Most of his cabinet's members were holdovers from the Papen cabinet and included many right-wing independents along with two members of the nationalist German National People's Party (DNVP).

Schleicher, a Reichswehr general who retired from active service shortly before he became chancellor, hoped that he could weaken the Nazi Party by splitting it and bringing some of its members into his government, but his attempts to work with them failed. During his short time in office, he instituted a program of public works that helped lower the number of unemployed. He also worked internationally to free Germany from the arms limitations imposed after World War I.

In January 1933, von Papen and Adolf Hitler began to work together to oust Schleicher. When German President Paul von Hindenburg refused to order the state of emergency that Schleicher wanted to save his government, it left him no choice but to resign. The cabinet of Adolf Hitler followed two days later, on 30 January 1933.

== Appointment ==
In the November 1932 election, the Nazis won fewer seats than in the previous election, but Chancellor Franz von Papen was still unable to secure a Reichstag that could be counted on not to pass another vote of no-confidence against his government. Papen's attempt to negotiate with Adolf Hitler failed. Under pressure from Kurt von Schleicher, Papen resigned on 17 November and formed a caretaker government. He told his cabinet that he planned to have martial law declared, which would allow him to rule as a dictator. At a cabinet meeting on 2 December, however, Papen was informed by Schleicher's associate, Lieutenant Colonel Eugen Ott, that Reichswehr war games showed there was no way to maintain order against a potential uprising by the Nazis and Communists. Realising that Schleicher was moving to replace him, Papen asked President Paul von Hindenburg to dismiss Schleicher as Reichswehr minister. Instead, Hindenburg appointed Schleicher chancellor.

== Cabinet formation ==
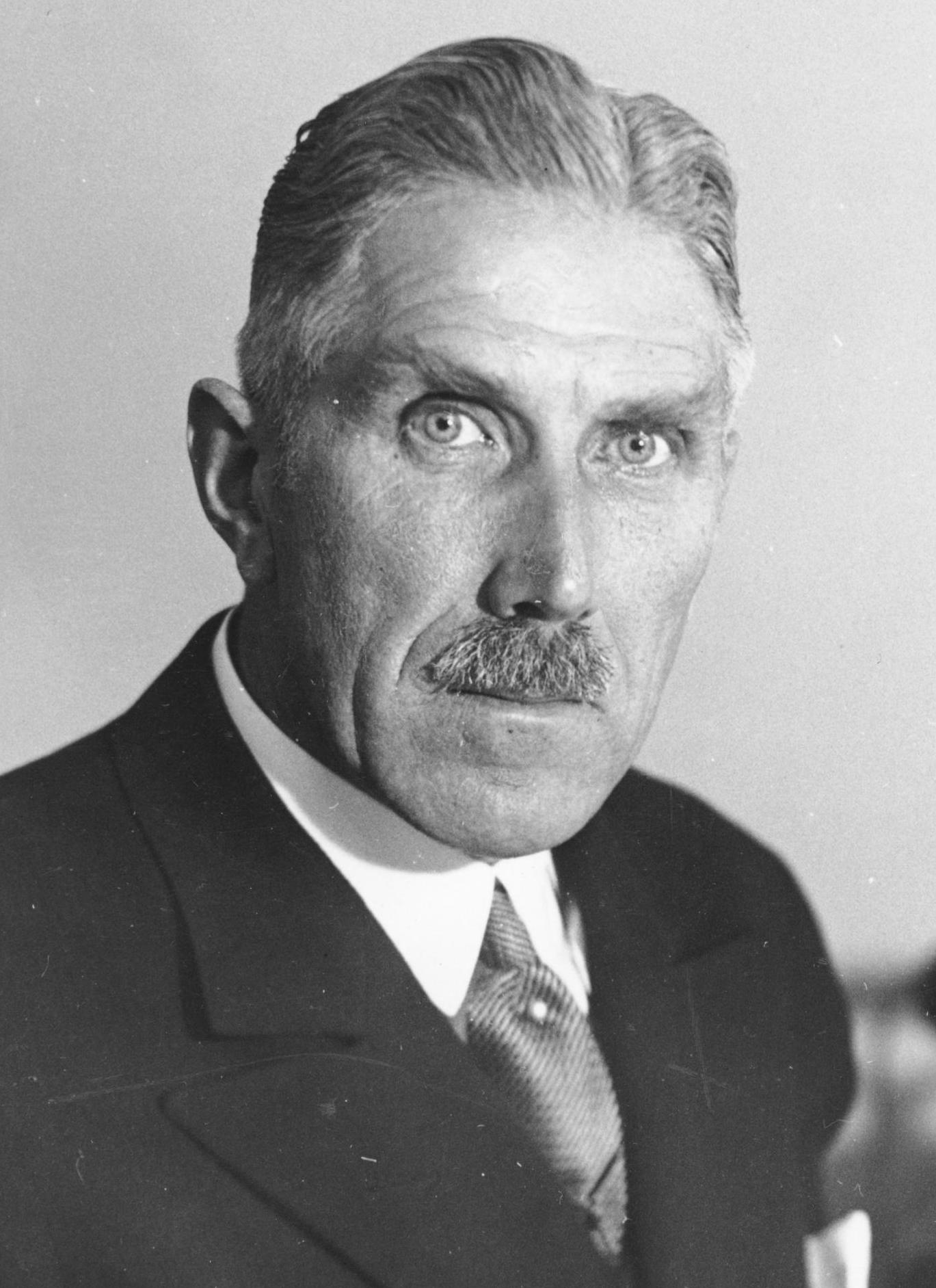
Franz von Papen, German chancellor before Schleicher

Schleicher hoped that he would be able to form a majority coalition in the Reichstag by bringing the Nazis into his government. On 23 November 1932, he offered Hitler the vice-chancellorship in his potential new cabinet. The party "maximalists" around Hitler insisted that he have full presidential powers, although there were also a number of pragmatists in the party, notably Gregor Strasser, who were willing to work with Schleicher on less absolute terms. The division played into Schleicher's plan to weaken the Nazis by forming an alliance (the Querfront) that would bring together various groups that favoured an authoritarian regime. In coalition talks with the other Reichstag parties, Schleicher told them that under the right circumstances he might be willing to work with the Nazis. He went so far as to offer to make Strasser vice-chancellor and minister president of Prussia . After a stormy meeting with Hitler, Strasser resigned from the Nazi Party on 8 December. That left Hitler's "maximalists" in control, and ended any possibility of the Nazis joining the Schleicher government.

Schleicher wanted to save and strengthen the system of presidential governments that had begun under Heinrich Brüning. Both Brüning and Papen had bypassed the Reichstag and governed using the emergency decrees that Article 48 of the Weimar Constitution granted the president. After failing to split the Nazis and bring the party into his government, Schleicher hoped to convince President Hindenburg to declare a state of emergency that would unconstitutionally delay elections and give Schleicher time to finalise his plans and stabilise his government.

Schleicher took over Papen's cabinet with only three changes: Franz Bracht, who had been minister without portfolio under Papen, replaced Wilhelm von Gayl as minister of the Interior, and Friedrich Syrup replaced Hugo Schäffer as minister of Labour. As in Papen's cabinet, all members were independents except for two from the German National People's Party (DNVP).

== Ministers ==
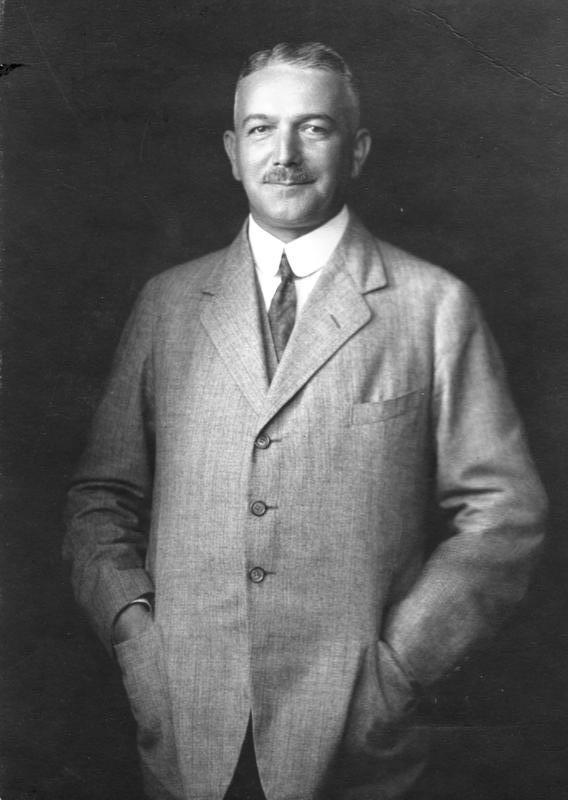
Konstantin von Neurath (Ind.), Minister of Foreign Affairs

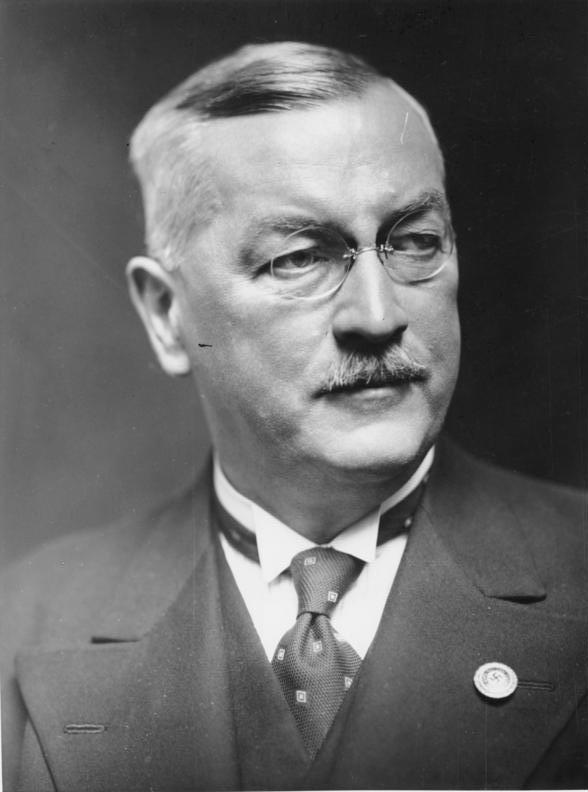
Franz Gürtner (DNVP), Minister of Justice

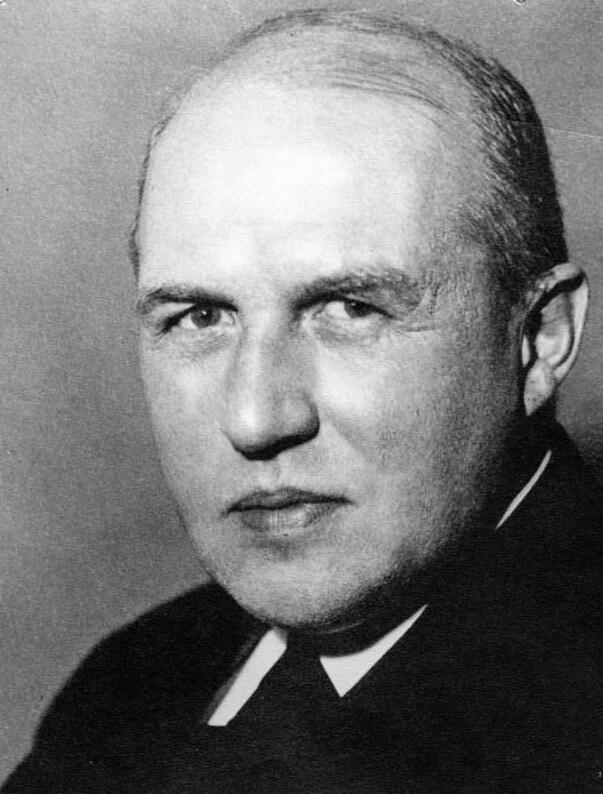
Friedrich Syrup (Ind.), Minister of Labour

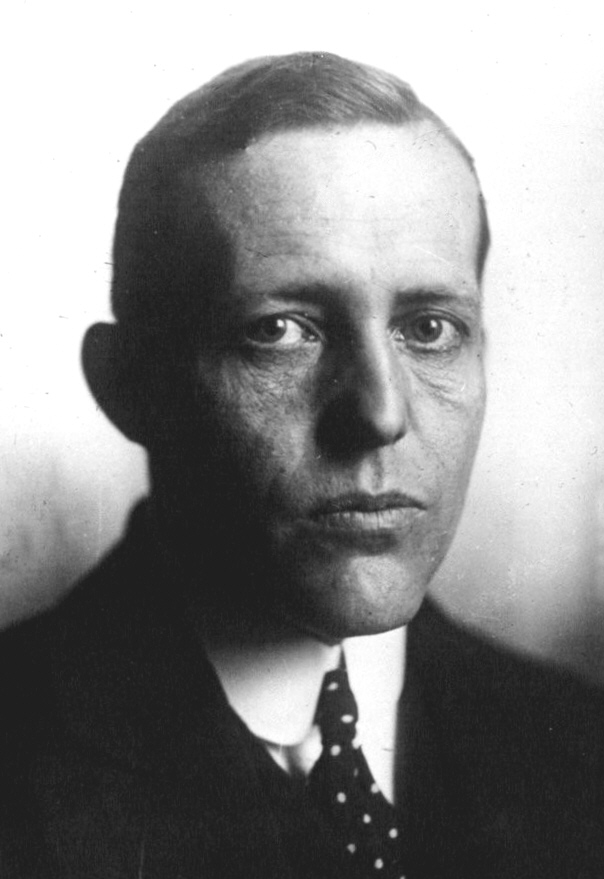
Lutz Graf Schwerin von Krosigk (Ind.), Minister of Finance

The cabinet consisted of the following ministers:

Portfolio	Minister	Took office	Left office	Party
Chancellorship	Kurt von Schleicher	3 December 1932	30 January 1933	Independent
Vice-Chancellorship	Vacant	-	-	-
Foreign Affairs	Konstantin von Neurath	3 December 1932	30 January 1933	Independent
Interior	Franz Bracht (Note: Bracht had previously belonged to the Centre Party)	3 December 1932	30 January 1933	Independent
Justice	Franz Gürtner	3 December 1932	30 January 1933	DNVP
Labour	Friedrich Syrup	3 December 1932	30 January 1933	Independent
Reichswehr	Kurt von Schleicher	3 December 1932	30 January 1933	Independent
Economic Affairs	Hermann Warmbold	3 December 1932	30 January 1933	Independent
Finance	Lutz Graf Schwerin von Krosigk	3 December 1932	30 January 1933	Independent
Food and Agriculture	Magnus Freiherr von Braun	3 December 1932	30 January 1933	DNVP
Transport	Paul Freiherr von Eltz-Rübenach	3 December 1932	30 January 1933	Independent
Postal Affairs	Paul Freiherr von Eltz-Rübenach	3 December 1932	30 January 1933	Independent
Employment (Note: Gereke was a commissioner rather than a minister. Since job creation was a high priority of the Schleicher cabinet, the Employment Department head had a seat on the cabinet.)	Günther Gereke	3 December 1932	30 January 1933	Independent
Without portfolio	Johannes Popitz	3 December 1932	30 January 1933	Independent

== Key policies ==
In his inaugural declaration, Schleicher emphasised job creation as his government's major goal. Through a program of public works, two million unemployed were put to work by July of 1933. Most European countries were raising tariffs as part of their attempts to recover from the Great Depression, but Schleicher was indecisive on the matter. His inaction especially angered the large landowners in the eastern provinces of Germany – a group to which Hindenburg belonged – who wanted higher tariffs on foodstuffs. Their anger did much to weaken Schleicher's position.

At the World Disarmament Conference in Geneva, Schleicher worked to abolish the arms limitations imposed on Germany by the Treaty of Versailles. He was confident that the agreement in principle on Germany's equality of status with the other powers would allow it to rearm and build up its armed forces.

== Fall of the cabinet ==
Papen, who was embittered at Schleicher for ousting him from the chancellorship, had at least two meetings with Hitler in January 1933 at which they plotted to remove Schleicher and form a new government under the leadership of Hitler, Papen and the Nazi Party. When Schleicher found out about their cooperation, he went to Hindenburg with his plan for a state of emergency. The centre and left parties in the Reichstag were furious when word of his intentions leaked out. After Schleicher backed down, the conservatives who opposed the Nazis also attacked him. Hindenburg, out of reluctance to make such a clearly unconstitutional move, once again refused to declare a state of emergency and dissolve the Reichstag. With virtually all his support lost, Schleicher resigned on 28 January 1933, opening the way for Hitler to become chancellor.
