= List of chancellors of Germany =

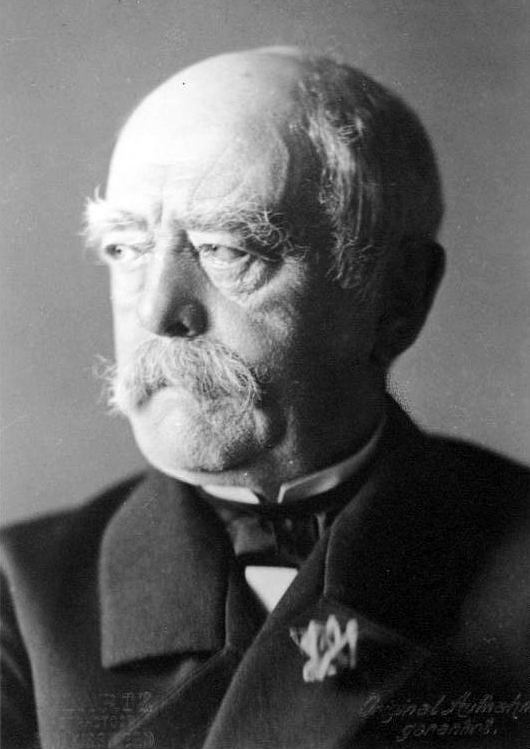
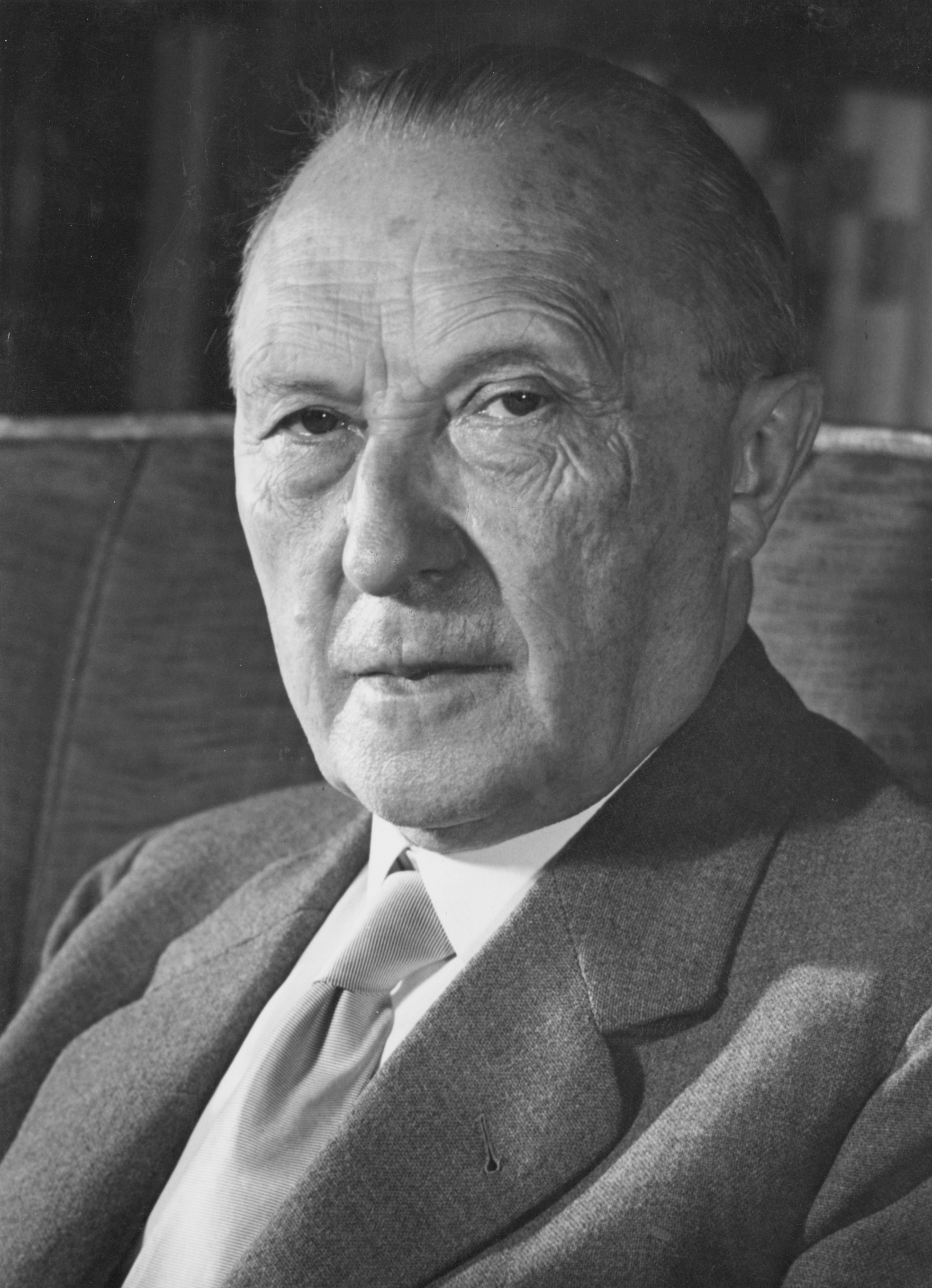
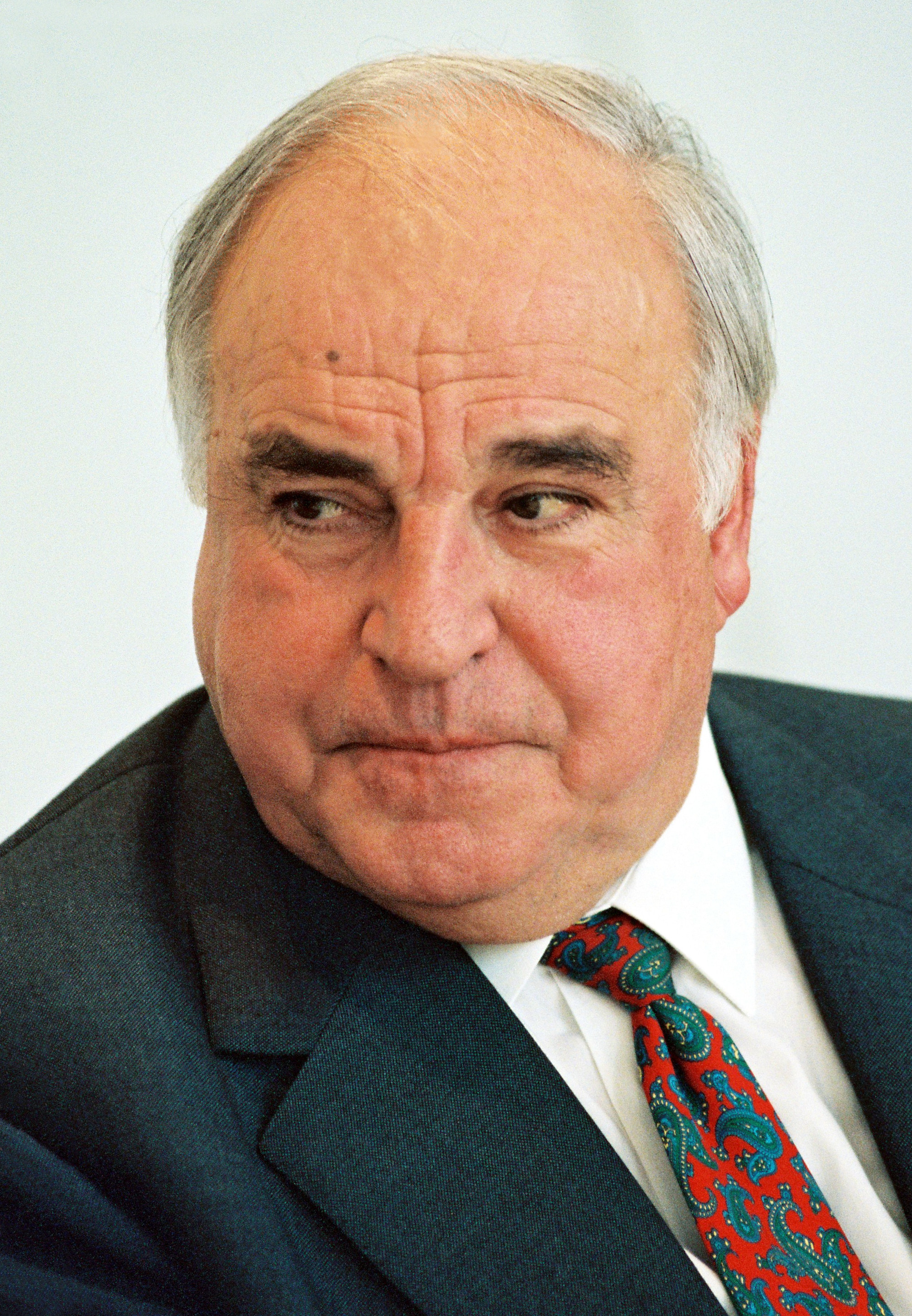
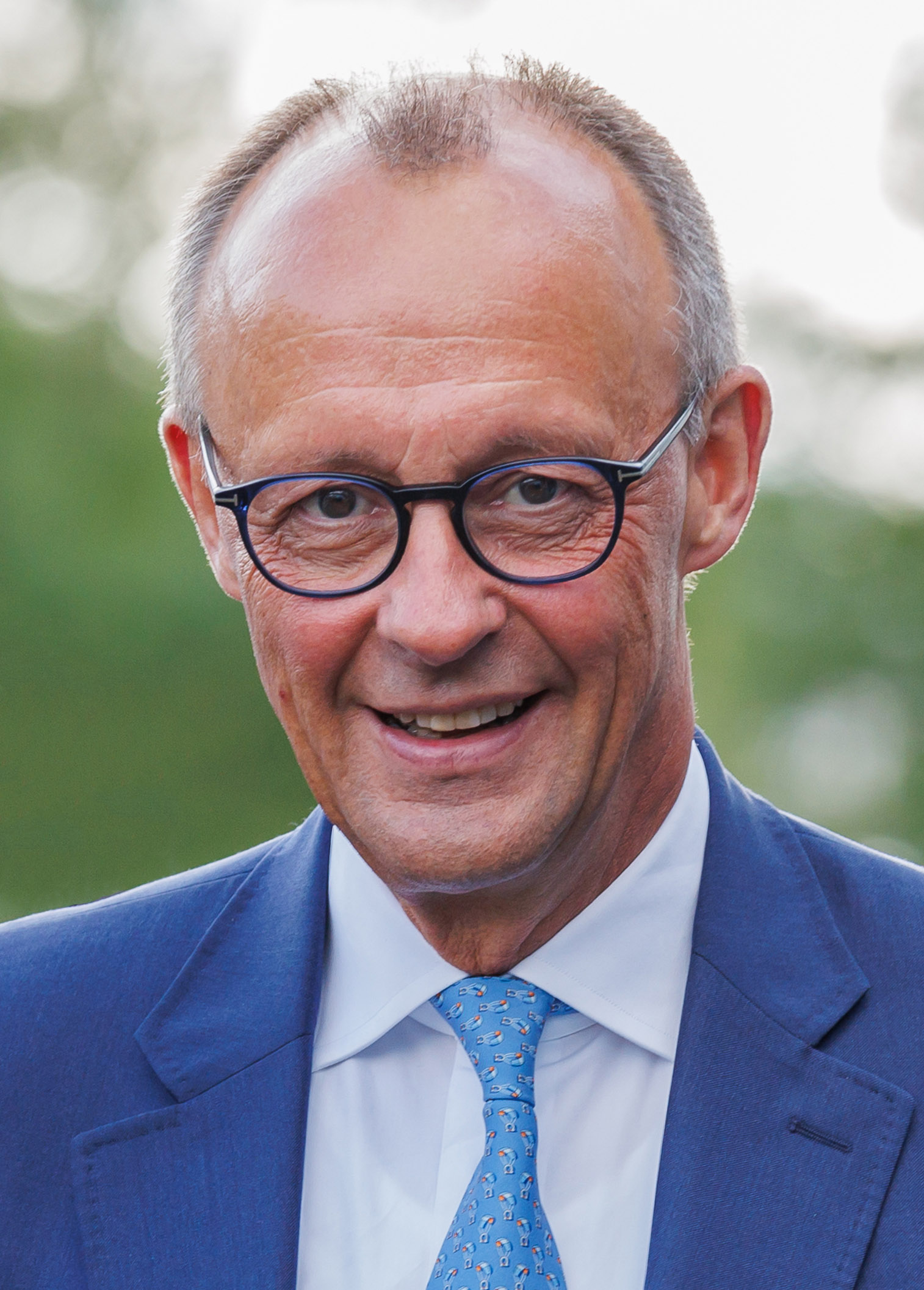
- Top left: Otto von Bismarck was the first chancellor of Germany with the creation of the North German Confederation and later the German Empire.
- Top right: Konrad Adenauer was the first chancellor of the Federal Republic of Germany.
- Bottom left: Helmut Kohl was chancellor during the period of German reunification in 1990.
- Bottom right: Friedrich Merz is the current chancellor.

The chancellor of Germany is the political leader of Germany and the head of the federal government. The office holder is responsible for selecting all other members of the government and chairing cabinet meetings.

The office was created in the North German Confederation in 1867, when Otto von Bismarck became the first chancellor. With the unification of Germany and establishment of the German Empire in 1871, the Confederation evolved into a German nation-state and its leader became known as the chancellor of Germany. Originally, the chancellor was only responsible to the emperor. This changed with the constitutional reform in 1918, when the Parliament was given the right to dismiss the chancellor. Under the 1919 Weimar Constitution the chancellors were appointed by the directly elected president, but were responsible to the Reichstag (parliament).

The constitution was set aside during the 1933–1945 Nazi regime. During the Allied occupation, no independent German government and no chancellor existed. The office was not reconstituted in East Germany – the head of government of East Germany was chairman of the Council of Ministers – but in West Germany the 1949 Basic Law made the chancellor the most important office, while diminishing the role of the president.

== North German Confederation (1867–1871) ==
The North German Confederation came into existence after the German Confederation was dissolved following the Prussian victory in the Austro-Prussian War of 1866. The chancellor was appointed by the Bundespräsidium, a position that was held constitutionally by the Prussian king.

Political parties: None

Portrait	Name (Birth–Death)	Term of office			Political party
Portrait	Name (Birth–Death)	Took office	Left office	Time in office	Political party
Federal Chancellor of the North German Confederation
	Otto von Bismarck (1815–1898)	1 July 1867	21 March 1871	3 years, 263 days	Non-partisan

== German Empire (1871–1918) ==
The German Empire was born out of the North German Confederation as result of the Franco-Prussian War (1870/71). The Präsidium (the Prussian king, who now had also the title Emperor) named the chancellor.

Political parties: None Centre

Portrait	Name (Birth–Death)	Term of office			Political party	Cabinet
Portrait	Name (Birth–Death)	Took office	Left office	Time in office	Political party	Cabinet
Chancellor of the German Reich
	Otto von Bismarck (1815–1898)	21 March 1871	20 March 1890	18 years, 364 days	Non-partisan	Bismarck
	Leo von Caprivi (1831–1899)	20 March 1890	26 October 1894	4 years, 220 days	Non-partisan	Caprivi
Office vacant between 26 October 1894 and 29 October 1894
	Chlodwig zu Hohenlohe-Schillingsfürst (1819–1901)	29 October 1894	17 October 1900	5 years, 353 days	Non-partisan	Hohenlohe-Schillingsfürst
	Bernhard von Bülow (1849–1929)	17 October 1900	14 July 1909	8 years, 270 days	Non-partisan	Bülow
	Theobald von Bethmann Hollweg (1856–1921)	14 July 1909	13 July 1917	7 years, 364 days	Non-partisan	Bethmann Hollweg
	Georg Michaelis (1857–1936)	14 July 1917	1 November 1917	110 days	Non-partisan	Michaelis
	Georg von Hertling (1843–1919)	1 November 1917	30 September 1918	333 days	Centre Party	Hertling
Office vacant between 30 September 1918 and 3 October 1918
	Max von Baden (1867–1929)	3 October 1918	9 November 1918	37 days	Non-partisan	Baden

== Weimar Republic (1918–1933) ==
On 9 November 1918, Chancellor Max von Baden handed over his office to Friedrich Ebert. Ebert continued to serve as head of government during the three months between the end of the German Empire in November 1918 and the first gathering of the National Assembly in February 1919 as both Chancellor and Chairman of the Council of the People's Deputies. Until 29 December 1918 USPD Leader Hugo Haase served as co-chairman of the Council.

The Weimar Constitution of 1919 set the framework for the Weimar Republic. The chancellors were officially installed by the president; frequently the chancellor did not have a majority in parliament.

Political parties: SPD Centre DVP NSDAP None

Portrait	Name (Birth–Death)	Term of office			Political party	Cabinet	Reichstag
Portrait	Name (Birth–Death)	Took office	Left office	Time in office	Political party	Cabinet	Reichstag
Chancellor of the German Reich
	Friedrich Ebert (1871–1925)	9 November 1918	13 February 1919	96 days	Social Democratic Party	Council of the People's Deputies; SPD–USPD (as of 29 December 1918 SPD alone)	–
	Friedrich Ebert (1871–1925)	Chancellor / President of the Council of the People's Deputies			Social Democratic Party	Council of the People's Deputies; SPD–USPD (as of 29 December 1918 SPD alone)	–
	Philipp Scheidemann (1865–1939)	13 February 1919	20 June 1919	127 days	Social Democratic Party	Scheidemann; SPD–DDP–Z (Weimar Coalition)	National; Assembly (Jan.1919)
	Philipp Scheidemann (1865–1939)	Minister-President (Note: The title of Chancellor was not formally used until the Weimar Constitution took effect. Until then, Scheidemann and Bauer governed as Reichsministerpräsident.)			Social Democratic Party	Scheidemann; SPD–DDP–Z (Weimar Coalition)	National; Assembly (Jan.1919)
	Gustav Bauer (1870–1944)	21 June 1919	26 March 1920	273 days	Social Democratic Party	Bauer; SPD–DDP–Z (Weimar Coalition)	National; Assembly (Jan.1919)
	Gustav Bauer (1870–1944)	Minister-President until 14 August 1919			Social Democratic Party	Bauer; SPD–DDP–Z (Weimar Coalition)	National; Assembly (Jan.1919)
	Hermann Müller (1876–1931)	27 March 1920	21 June 1920	86 days	Social Democratic Party	Müller I SPD–DDP–Z (Weimar Coalition)	National; Assembly (Jan.1919)
Office vacant between 21 June 1920 and 25 June 1920							National; Assembly (Jan.1919)
	Constantin Fehrenbach (1852–1926)	25 June 1920	10 May 1921	319 days	Centre Party	Fehrenbach; Z–DDP–DVP	1 (Jun.1920)
	Joseph Wirth (1879–1956)	10 May 1921	22 November 1922	1 year, 196 days	Centre Party	Wirth I Z–SPD–DDP (Weimar Coalition)	1 (Jun.1920)
	Joseph Wirth (1879–1956)	10 May 1921	22 November 1922	1 year, 196 days	Centre Party	Wirth II; Z–SPD–DDP (Weimar Coalition)	1 (Jun.1920)
	Wilhelm Cuno (1876–1933)	22 November 1922	12 August 1923	263 days	Non-partisan	Cuno; Ind.–DVP–DDP–Z–BVP	1 (Jun.1920)
	Gustav Stresemann (1878–1929)	13 August 1923	30 November 1923	109 days	German People's Party	Stresemann I DVP–SPD–Z–DDP	1 (Jun.1920)
	Gustav Stresemann (1878–1929)	13 August 1923	30 November 1923	109 days	German People's Party	Stresemann II; DVP–SPD–Z–DDP	1 (Jun.1920)
	Wilhelm Marx (1863–1946)	30 November 1923	15 January 1925	1 year, 46 days	Centre Party	Marx I Z–DVP–BVP–DDP	1 (Jun.1920)
	Wilhelm Marx (1863–1946)	30 November 1923	15 January 1925	1 year, 46 days	Centre Party	Marx II; Z–DVP–DDP	2 (May 1924)
	Hans Luther (1879–1962)	15 January 1925	12 May 1926	1 year, 117 days	Non-partisan	Luther I DVP–DNVP–Z–DDP–BVP	3 (Dec.1924)
	Hans Luther (1879–1962)	15 January 1925	12 May 1926	1 year, 117 days	Non-partisan	Luther II; DVP–Z–DDP–BVP	3 (Dec.1924)
	Otto Gessler (1875–1955); Acting (Note: As Vice Chancellor under Luther, Gessler served as acting Chancellor following Luther's resignation.)	12 May 1926	17 May 1926	5 days	German Democratic Party	Luther II; DVP–Z–DDP–BVP	3 (Dec.1924)
	Wilhelm Marx (1863–1946)	17 May 1926	28 June 1928	2 years, 42 days	Centre Party	Marx III; Z–DVP–DDP–BVP	3 (Dec.1924)
	Wilhelm Marx (1863–1946)	17 May 1926	28 June 1928	2 years, 42 days	Centre Party	Marx IV; Z–DNVP–DVP–BVP	3 (Dec.1924)
	Hermann Müller (1876–1931)	28 June 1928	27 March 1930	1 year, 272 days	Social Democratic Party	Müller II; SPD–DVP–DDP–Z–BVP	4 (May 1928)
Office vacant between 27 March 1930 and 30 March 1930
	Heinrich Brüning (1885–1970)	30 March 1930	1 June 1932	2 years, 63 days	Centre Party	Brüning I Z–DDP–DVP–WP–BVP–KVP	5 (Sep.1930)
	Heinrich Brüning (1885–1970)	30 March 1930	1 June 1932	2 years, 63 days	Centre Party	Brüning II; Z–DStP–BVP–KVP–CLV	5 (Sep.1930)
	Franz von Papen (1879–1969)	1 June 1932	3 December 1932	185 days	Non-partisan	Papen; Ind.–DNVP	6 (Jul.1932)
	Kurt von Schleicher (1882–1934)	3 December 1932	30 January 1933	56 days	Non-partisan	Schleicher; Ind.–DNVP	7 (Nov.1932)

== Nazi Germany (1933–1945) ==
Adolf Hitler was appointed as chancellor on 30 January 1933 by President Paul von Hindenburg. Soon after that, Hindenburg suspended civil liberties the Reichstag Fire Decree (German: Reichstagsbrandverordnung). Following the elections, the German parliament passed the Enabling Act (German: Ermächtigungsgesetz), which gave the chancellor dictatorial powers. These events marked the end of the Weimar Republic and the beginning of Nazi Germany. Hitler thereupon destroyed all democratic institutions and consolidated all power to himself. After the death of president Paul von Hindenburg in 1934, Hitler also became head of state as Führer und Reichskanzler.

Political parties: NSDAP

Portrait	Name (Birth–Death)	Term of office			Political party	Cabinet	Reichstag (Note: No elections held during World War II. Last convened on 26 April 1942.)
Portrait	Name (Birth–Death)	Took office	Left office	Time in office	Political party	Cabinet	Reichstag
Chancellor of the German Reich
	Adolf Hitler (1889–1945)	30 January 1933	30 April 1945	12 years, 90 days	National Socialist; German Workers' Party	Hitler; NSDAP–DNVP (as of 27 June 1933 NSDAP alone)	8 (Mar.1933)
	Adolf Hitler (1889–1945)	30 January 1933	30 April 1945	12 years, 90 days	National Socialist; German Workers' Party	Hitler; NSDAP–DNVP (as of 27 June 1933 NSDAP alone)	9 (Nov.1933)
	Adolf Hitler (1889–1945)	30 January 1933	30 April 1945	12 years, 90 days	National Socialist; German Workers' Party	Hitler; NSDAP–DNVP (as of 27 June 1933 NSDAP alone)	10 (Mar.1936)
	Adolf Hitler (1889–1945)	30 January 1933	30 April 1945	12 years, 90 days	National Socialist; German Workers' Party	Hitler; NSDAP–DNVP (as of 27 June 1933 NSDAP alone)	11 (Apr.1938)
	Joseph Goebbels (1897–1945)	30 April 1945	1 May 1945	1 day	National Socialist; German Workers' Party	Goebbels (Note: Cabinet nominated in Hitler's testament but never convened.); NSDAP	—
	Lutz Graf Schwerin von Krosigk (Note: Lutz von Krosigk did not accept the position of chancellor, but acted as "Leading Minister" with the power of a chancellor.) (1887–1977)	2 May 1945	23 May 1945	21 days	National Socialist; German Workers' Party	Schwerin von Krosigk; NSDAP	—

== Federal Republic of Germany (1949–present) ==
In 1949, two separate German states were established: the Federal Republic of Germany (known as West Germany) and the German Democratic Republic (known as East Germany). The list below gives the chancellors of West Germany; the government of East Germany was headed by the chairman of the Council of Ministers. In 1990, East Germany was dissolved as it merged with West Germany; Germany was reunified. It retained the name of the Federal Republic of Germany.

Political parties: CDU (6) SPD (4)

Denotes acting (i.e. ad interim)

Portrait	Name (Birth–Death)	Term of office			Political party	Cabinet	Bundestag
Portrait	Name (Birth–Death)	Took office	Left office	Time in office	Political party	Cabinet	Bundestag
Federal Chancellor of the Federal Republic of Germany
	Konrad Adenauer (1876–1967)	15 September 1949	15 October 1963	14 years, 30 days	Christian Democratic Union (CDU)	Adenauer I CDU/CSU–FDP–DP	1 (1949)
	Konrad Adenauer (1876–1967)	15 September 1949	15 October 1963	14 years, 30 days	Christian Democratic Union (CDU)	Adenauer II; CDU/CSU–FDP/FVP–DP–GB/BHE	2 (1953)
	Konrad Adenauer (1876–1967)	15 September 1949	15 October 1963	14 years, 30 days	Christian Democratic Union (CDU)	Adenauer III; CDU/CSU–DP	3 (1957)
	Konrad Adenauer (1876–1967)	15 September 1949	15 October 1963	14 years, 30 days	Christian Democratic Union (CDU)	Adenauer IV; CDU/CSU–FDP	4 (1961)
	Ludwig Erhard (1897–1977)	15 October 1963	30 November 1966	3 years, 46 days	Christian Democratic Union (CDU) (Note: Erhard never formally joined the CDU. However, he spent his entire career with the CDU and on 23 March 1966 was elected the party's chairman, serving until 1967. His lack of party membership was not widely known until decades after his death.)	Erhard I CDU/CSU–FDP	4 (1961)
	Ludwig Erhard (1897–1977)	15 October 1963	30 November 1966	3 years, 46 days	Christian Democratic Union (CDU)	Erhard II; CDU/CSU–FDP	5 (1965)
	Kurt Georg Kiesinger (1904–1988)	30 November 1966	21 October 1969	2 years, 325 days	Christian Democratic Union (CDU)	Kiesinger; CDU/CSU–SPD	5 (1965)
	Willy Brandt (1913–1992)	21 October 1969	7 May 1974	4 years, 198 days	Social Democratic Party (SPD)	Brandt I SPD–FDP	6 (1969)
	Willy Brandt (1913–1992)	21 October 1969	7 May 1974	4 years, 198 days	Social Democratic Party (SPD)	Brandt II; SPD–FDP	7 (1972)
	Walter Scheel (1919–2016); Acting (Note: As Vice Chancellor under Brandt, Scheel served as acting Chancellor following Brandt's resignation.)	7 May 1974	16 May 1974	9 days	Free Democratic Party (FDP)	Brandt II (acting)	7 (1972)
	Helmut Schmidt (1918–2015)	16 May 1974	1 October 1982	8 years, 138 days	Social Democratic Party (SPD)	Schmidt I SPD–FDP	7 (1972)
	Helmut Schmidt (1918–2015)	16 May 1974	1 October 1982	8 years, 138 days	Social Democratic Party (SPD)	Schmidt II; SPD–FDP	8 (1976)
	Helmut Schmidt (1918–2015)	16 May 1974	1 October 1982	8 years, 138 days	Social Democratic Party (SPD)	Schmidt III; SPD–FDP	9 (1980)
	Helmut Kohl (1930–2017)	1 October 1982	27 October 1998	16 years, 26 days	Christian Democratic Union (CDU)	Kohl I CDU/CSU–FDP	9 (1980)
	Helmut Kohl (1930–2017)	1 October 1982	27 October 1998	16 years, 26 days	Christian Democratic Union (CDU)	Kohl II; CDU/CSU–FDP	10 (1983)
	Helmut Kohl (1930–2017)	1 October 1982	27 October 1998	16 years, 26 days	Christian Democratic Union (CDU)	Kohl III; CDU/CSU–FDP	11 (1987)
	Helmut Kohl (1930–2017)	1 October 1982	27 October 1998	16 years, 26 days	Christian Democratic Union (CDU)	Kohl IV; CDU/CSU–FDP	12 (1990)
	Helmut Kohl (1930–2017)	1 October 1982	27 October 1998	16 years, 26 days	Christian Democratic Union (CDU)	Kohl V CDU/CSU–FDP	13 (1994)
	Gerhard Schröder (born 1944)	27 October 1998	22 November 2005	7 years, 26 days	Social Democratic Party (SPD)	Schröder I SPD–Green	14 (1998)
	Gerhard Schröder (born 1944)	27 October 1998	22 November 2005	7 years, 26 days	Social Democratic Party (SPD)	Schröder II; SPD–Green	15 (2002)
	Angela Merkel (born 1954)	22 November 2005	8 December 2021	16 years, 16 days	Christian Democratic Union (CDU)	Merkel I CDU/CSU–SPD	16 (2005)
	Angela Merkel (born 1954)	22 November 2005	8 December 2021	16 years, 16 days	Christian Democratic Union (CDU)	Merkel II; CDU/CSU–FDP	17 (2009)
	Angela Merkel (born 1954)	22 November 2005	8 December 2021	16 years, 16 days	Christian Democratic Union (CDU)	Merkel III; CDU/CSU–SPD	18 (2013)
	Angela Merkel (born 1954)	22 November 2005	8 December 2021	16 years, 16 days	Christian Democratic Union (CDU)	Merkel IV; CDU/CSU–SPD	19 (2017)
	Olaf Scholz (born 1958)	8 December 2021	6 May 2025	3 years, 149 days	Social Democratic Party (SPD)	Scholz; SPD–Green–FDP	20 (2021)
	Friedrich Merz (born 1955)	6 May 2025	Incumbent	1 year, 187 days	Christian Democratic Union (CDU)	Merz; CDU/CSU–SPD	21 (2025)

== Longest-serving chancellors ==
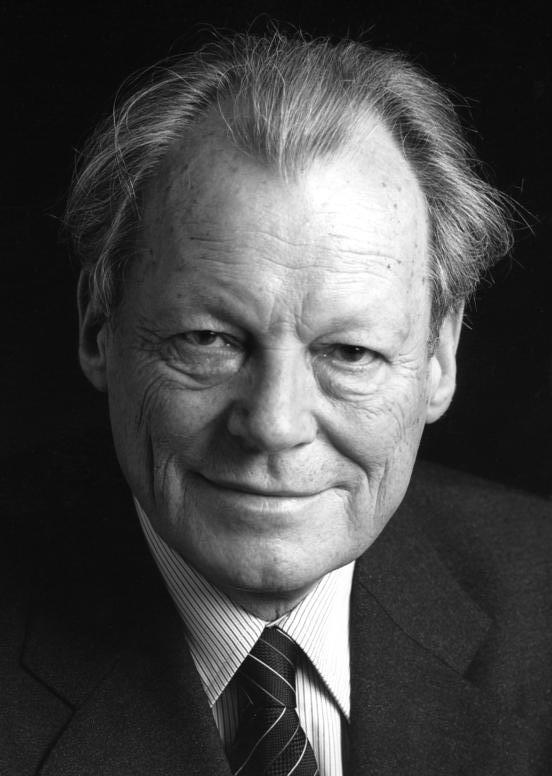
Willy Brandt, first SPD chancellor after World War II

The following table lists all chancellors of the Federal Republic of Germany (since 1949) ranked by their length of tenure, with the incumbent chancellor's tenure automatically updating daily.

Rank	Chancellor	Length of tenure	Timespan	Party
1	Helmut Kohl	16 years, 26 days	1982–1998	CDU
2	Angela Merkel	16 years, 16 days	2005–2021	CDU
3	Konrad Adenauer	14 years, 31 days	1949–1963	CDU
4	Helmut Schmidt	8 years, 138 days	1974–1982	SPD
5	Gerhard Schröder	7 years, 26 days	1998–2005	SPD
6	Willy Brandt	4 years, 198 days	1969–1974	SPD
7	Olaf Scholz	3 years, 149 days	2021–2025	SPD
8	Ludwig Erhard	3 years, 46 days	1963–1966	CDU
9	Kurt Georg Kiesinger	2 years, 324 days	1966–1969	CDU
10	Friedrich Merz	1 year, 187 days	2025–present	CDU

== Chancellors by party ==
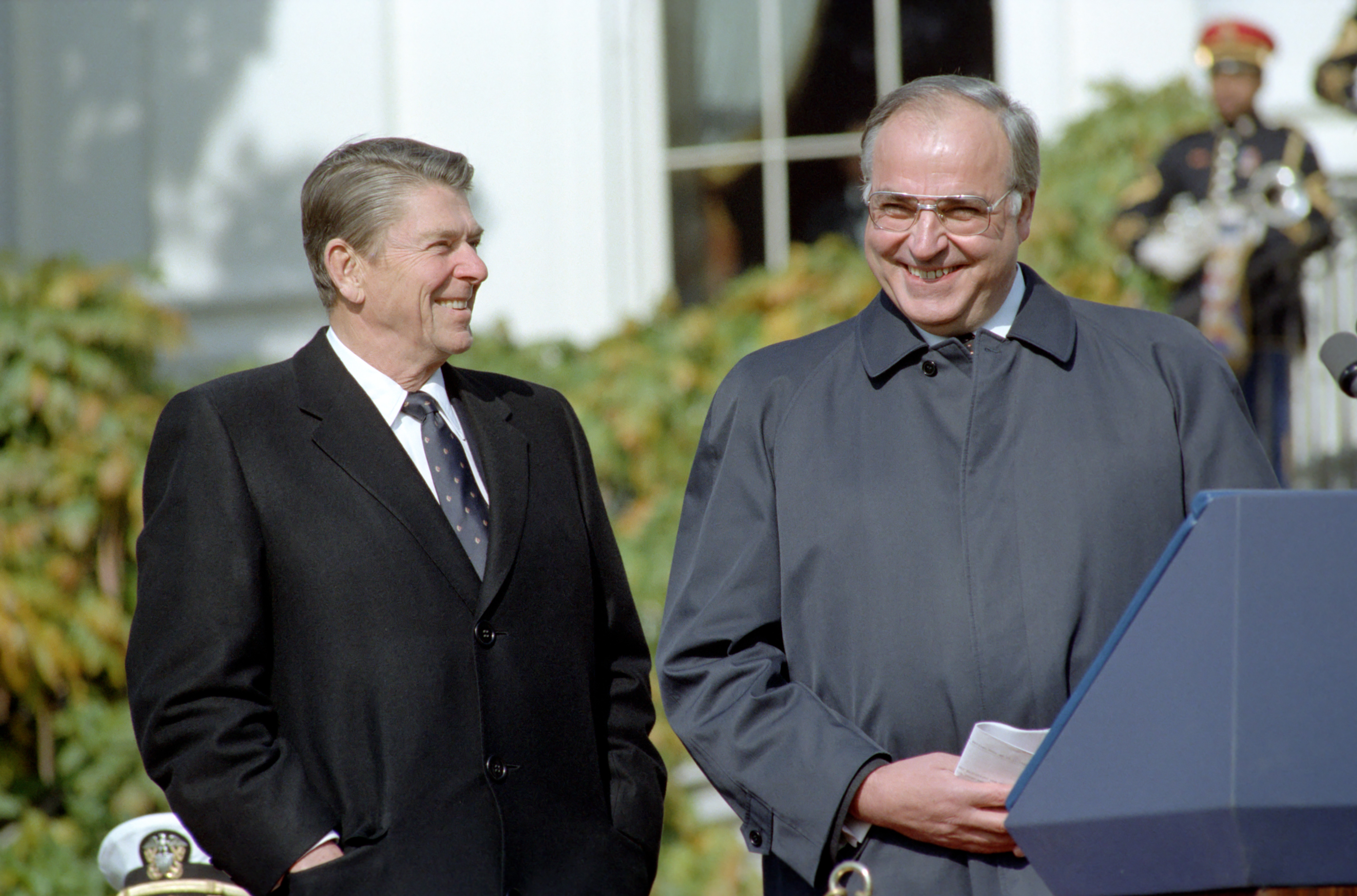
Helmut Kohl with U.S. President Ronald Reagan, symbolizing the CDU's dominance in post-war German politics

The following table summarizes chancellors of the Federal Republic of Germany grouped by political party.

Party	Total days in office	Number of chancellors	Chancellors
**CDU; Christian Democratic Union**	**19,629 (ongoing)**	6	Konrad Adenauer, Ludwig Erhard, Kurt Georg Kiesinger, Helmut Kohl, Angela Merkel, **Friedrich Merz**
SPD; Social Democratic Party	8,551	4	Willy Brandt, Helmut Schmidt, Gerhard Schröder, Olaf Scholz

Notes:

- Green indicates the party of the current incumbent chancellor
- Bold name indicates the current incumbent chancellor
- CDU total time includes the ongoing tenure of Friedrich Merz

== Age-related statistics ==
The following table shows age-related data for all chancellors of the Federal Republic of Germany, with living chancellors' ages automatically updating.

Chancellor	Born	Age at start of chancellorship	Age at end of chancellorship	Post-chancellorship timespan	Died	Lifespan
Konrad Adenauer	5 January 1876	**73 years, 253 days** 15 September 1949	**87 years, 284 days** 16 October 1963	3 years, 185 days	19 April 1967	91 years, 104 days
Ludwig Erhard	4 February 1897	**66 years, 254 days** 16 October 1963	**69 years, 300 days** 1 December 1966	10 years, 155 days	5 May 1977	80 years, 90 days
Kurt Georg Kiesinger	6 April 1904	**62 years, 239 days** 1 December 1966	**65 years, 198 days** 21 October 1969	18 years, 140 days	9 March 1988	83 years, 338 days
Willy Brandt	18 December 1913	**55 years, 307 days** 21 October 1969	**60 years, 140 days** 7 May 1974	18 years, 154 days	8 October 1992	78 years, 295 days
Helmut Schmidt	23 December 1918	**55 years, 144 days** 16 May 1974	**63 years, 282 days** 1 October 1982	33 years, 40 days	10 November 2015	96 years, 322 days
Helmut Kohl	3 April 1930	**52 years, 181 days** 1 October 1982	**68 years, 207 days** 27 October 1998	18 years, 232 days	16 June 2017	87 years, 74 days
Gerhard Schröder	7 April 1944	**54 years, 203 days** 27 October 1998	**61 years, 229 days** 22 November 2005	20 years, 352 days	—	82 years, 216 days
Angela Merkel	17 July 1954	**51 years, 128 days** 22 November 2005	**67 years, 144 days** 8 December 2021	4 years, 336 days	—	72 years, 115 days
Olaf Scholz	14 June 1958	**63 years, 177 days** 8 December 2021	**66 years, 326 days** 6 May 2025	1 year, 187 days	—	68 years, 148 days
**Friedrich Merz**	11 November 1955	**69 years, 176 days** 6 May 2025	Incumbent			70 years, 363 days

Notes:

- Light green indicates living former chancellors
- Green indicates the current incumbent chancellor
- Living chancellors' post-chancellorship timespan and lifespan automatically update daily

== Graphical representation ==
This is a graphical lifespan timeline of the Chancellors of Germany since 1949. They are listed in order of first assuming office.

The following chart shows chancellors by their age (living chancellors in green), with the years of their time in office in color.

== See also ==
- List of chancellors of Germany by time in office
- Religious affiliations of chancellors of Germany
- List of vice-chancellors of Germany
- Leadership of East Germany
- List of monarchs of Germany
- List of presidents of Germany
- Minister-Presidents of the French "Saar protectorate"
