= List of chancellors of Germany by time in office =

This is a list of chancellors of Germany by time in office from 1867 to 2026, including all the predecessor states of the current Federal Republic of Germany. This is based on the difference between dates; if counted by number of calendar days, all the figures would be one greater. Bismarck's successive tenure as Chancellor of the North German Confederation (1867–1871) and of the German Empire (1871–1890) is counted as one continuous term.

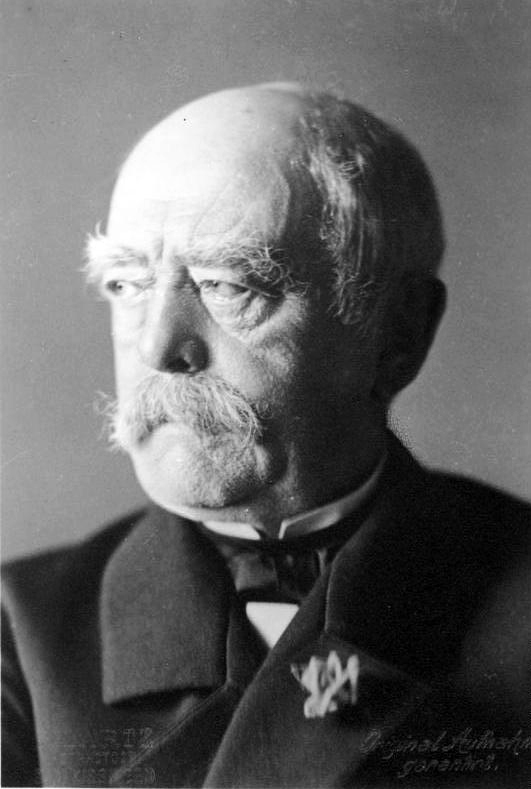
Otto von Bismarck, the first and longest-ever serving chancellor of Germany with almost 23 years

| # in office | Chancellor | Time in office | Rank |
|---|---|---|---|
| 1 | Otto von Bismarck | 22 years, 262 days | 1 |
| 32 | Helmut Kohl | 16 years, 26 days | 2 |
| 34 | Angela Merkel | 16 years, 16 days | 3 |
| 27 | Konrad Adenauer | 14 years, 31 days | 4 |
| 24 | Adolf Hitler | 12 years, 90 days | 5 |
| 4 | Bernhard von Bülow | 8 years, 270 days | 6 |
| 31 | Helmut Schmidt | 8 years, 138 days | 7 |
| 5 | Theobald von Bethmann Hollweg | 7 years, 364 days | 8 |
| 33 | Gerhard Schröder | 7 years, 26 days | 9 |
| 3 | Chlodwig zu Hohenlohe-Schillingsfürst | 5 years, 353 days | 10 |
| 2 | Leo von Caprivi | 4 years, 220 days | 11 |
| 30 | Willy Brandt | 4 years, 198 days | 12 |
| 35 | Olaf Scholz | 3 years, 149 days | 13 |
| 28 | Ludwig Erhard | 3 years, 46 days | 14 |
| 29 | Kurt Georg Kiesinger | 2 years, 324 days | 15 |
| 21 | Heinrich Brüning | 2 years, 61 days | 16 |
| 19 | Wilhelm Marx (second non-consecutive term) | 2 years, 26 days | 17 |
| 20 | Hermann Müller (second non-consecutive term) | 1 year, 272 days | 18 |
| 36 | Friedrich Merz | 1 year, 188 days | 19 |
| 14 | Joseph Wirth | 1 year, 188 days | 20 |
| 18 | Hans Luther | 1 year, 117 days | 21 |
| 17 | Wilhelm Marx (first non-consecutive term) | 1 year, 46 days | 22 |
| 7 | Georg von Hertling | 333 days | 23 |
| 13 | Constantin Fehrenbach | 313 days | 24 |
| 11 | Gustav Bauer | 279 days | 25 |
| 15 | Wilhelm Cuno | 263 days | 26 |
| 22 | Franz von Papen | 169 days | 27 |
| 10 | Philipp Scheidemann | 127 days | 28 |
| 6 | Georg Michaelis | 110 days | 29 |
| 16 | Gustav Stresemann | 109 days | 30 |
| 9 | Friedrich Ebert | 96 days | 31 |
| 12 | Hermann Müller (first non-consecutive term) | 86 days | 32 |
| 23 | Kurt von Schleicher | 56 days | 33 |
| 8 | Max von Baden | 37 days | 34 |
| 26 | Lutz Graf Schwerin von Krosigk | 21 days | 35 |
| – | Walter Scheel (acting) | 9 days | 36 |
| 25 | Joseph Goebbels | 1 day | 37 |

== See also ==
- Chancellor of Germany
  - Chancellor of Germany (Federal Republic)
- Leadership of East Germany
- List of chancellors of Germany
- List of German monarchs
- President of Germany
  - List of German presidents
- President of Germany (1919–1945)
