= Second Brüning cabinet =

1931–32 cabinet of Weimar Germany

Second Cabinet of Heinrich Brüning
- 18th Cabinet of Weimar Germany
- 1931–1932
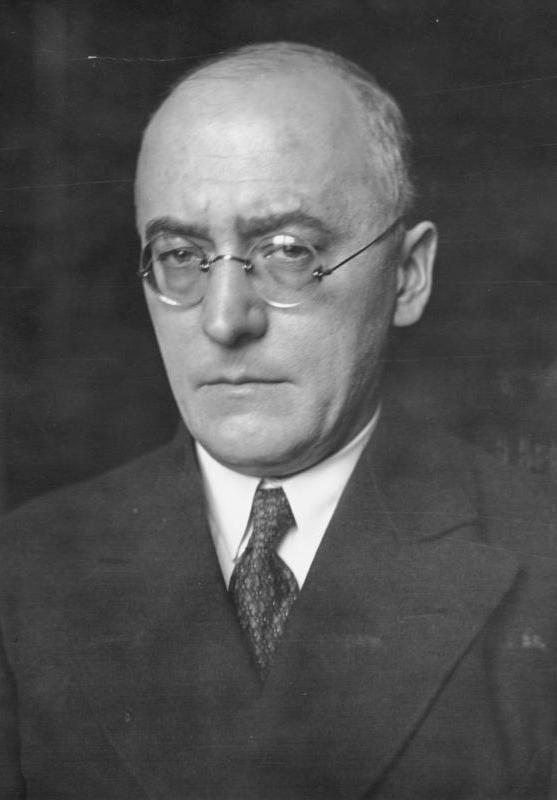
- Chancellor Heinrich Brüning
- Date formed: 10 October 1931
- Date dissolved: 1 June 1932 (7 months, 3 weeks and 1 day)

People and organisations
- President: Paul von Hindenburg
- Chancellor: Heinrich Brüning
- Vice Chancellor: Hermann Dietrich
- Member parties: Centre Party; German State Party; Christian-National Peasants' and Farmers' Party; Bavarian People's Party; Conservative People's Party
- Status in legislature: Minority Presidential Cabinet
- Opposition parties: German National People's Party; Communist Party of Germany; Nazi Party

History
- Election: 1930 federal election
- Legislature term: 5th Reichstag of the Weimar Republic
- Predecessor: First Brüning cabinet
- Successor: Papen cabinet

The second Brüning cabinet, headed by Heinrich Brüning of the Centre Party, was the eighteenth democratically elected government during the Weimar Republic. It took office on 10 October 1931 when it replaced the first Brüning cabinet, which had resigned the day before under pressure from President Paul von Hindenburg to move the cabinet significantly to the right.

The new cabinet consisted of members of five centre-right to right-wing parties along with three independents. It was not a coalition. As had been the case in his first cabinet, Brüning's second was a presidential cabinet. Because it was not possible to form a stable ruling coalition given the Reichstag's growing anti-democratic and increasingly fragmented parties, Brüning governed through decrees issued by President Hindenburg. He survived numerous votes of no confidence because the Social Democratic Party (SPD) tolerated his government as a better option than new elections that would almost certainly increase the already growing power of the Nazi Party in the Reichstag.

Beyond the parliamentary crisis, the Brüning government faced the severe economic effects of the Great Depression on Germany. Brüning nevertheless subordinated reviving the economy to attempting to free Germany from the reparations payments imposed on it by the Treaty of Versailles after World War I. His policy of deflation made the economic situation worse.

When Brüning lost Hindenburg's trust, his second cabinet resigned on 1 June 1932 and was replaced on the same day by the Papen cabinet led by Franz von Papen.

== Background ==
=== End of the first Brüning cabinet ===
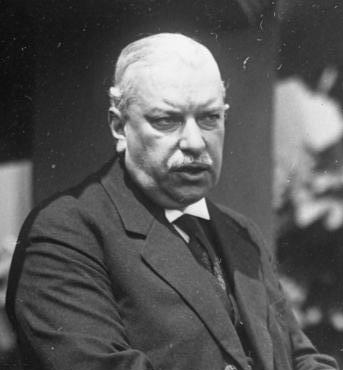
Hermann Dietrich (DStP), Vice-Chancellor and Minister of Finance

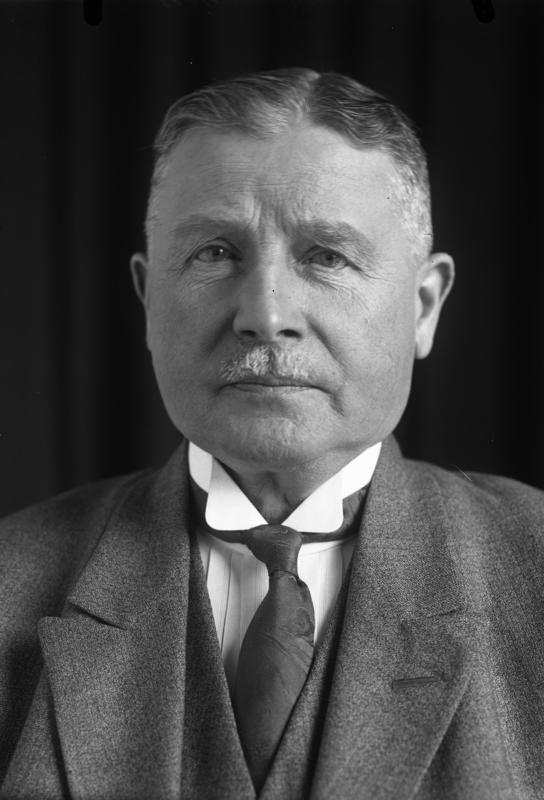
Wilhelm Groener (Ind.), Reichswehr Mininster and acting Minister of the Interior

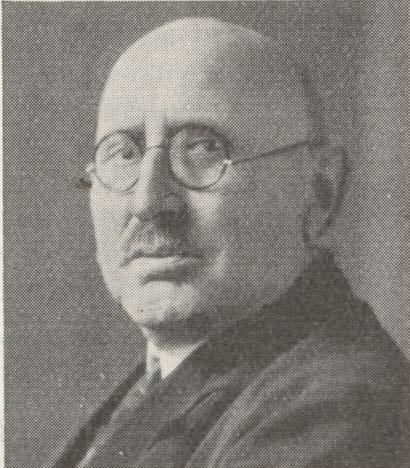
Adam Stegerwald (Centre), Minister of Labour

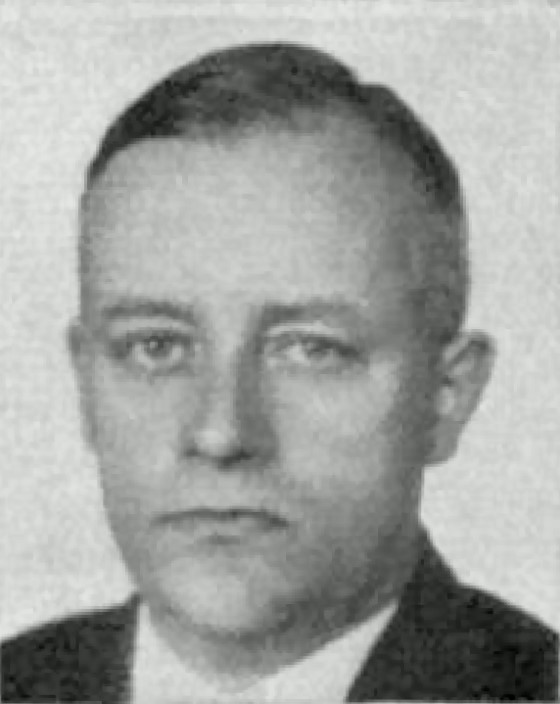
Gottfried Treviranus (KVP), Minister of Transport

Various people in the background of Berlin's political world, among them Generalmajor Kurt von Schleicher, had been pushing for significantly more conservative policies than Brüning was proposing. Brüning himself was not averse to the idea. In talks with Alfred Hugenberg, the head of the right-wing German National People's Party (DNVP), and Adolf Hitler of the Nazi Party (NSDAP), he told them that he would include them in his new government if their parties supported Hindenburg in the upcoming presidential election, something the two were not prepared to do. It was primarily Hindenburg who then urged a cabinet reshuffle. His aim was to replace ministers who appeared to him to be too Catholic or too left wing. After a conversation with Brüning, Hindenburg made it clear that the members of the cabinet should not be bound politically to a party and should be distinctly more conservative than before. After Brüning promised to adhere to those aims, Hindenburg accepted the government's resignation and requested that Brüning form a new cabinet.

=== Cabinet reshuffle ===
The formation of the new government was completed on 9 October and was less conservative than Hindenburg had wished. Brüning did not succeed in getting a leading representative of heavy industry to participate; instead, Hermann Warmbold, who had previously sat on the board of the chemical concern BASF, took over as minister of Economic Affairs. The Ministry of the Interior, previously headed by Joseph Wirth from the left wing of the Centre Party, was provisionally taken over by Reichswehr Minister Wilhelm Groener. The Ministry of Justice went to the former state secretary Curt Joël, an independent who was conservative and close to the DNVP. Gottfried Treviranus of the Conservative People's Party (KVP) replaced Theodor von Guérard (Centre) as minister of Transport. Brüning himself provisionally took over the post of foreign minister and remained in it throughout the cabinet's life. The rest of the ministerial line-up remained unchanged at that point. On 7 November, Hans Schlange-Schöningen of the Christian-National Peasants' and Farmers' Party (CNBL) was appointed commissioner for Eastern Aid and minister without portfolio.

The German People's Party (DVP) was no longer represented in the government. It expressed its distrust in it and turned to the right, although it did not participate in the Harzburg Front, a short-lived anti-Brüning alliance between the DNVP, NSDAP and 3 right-wing organizations. Its formation led to the SPD supporting the new cabinet as the lesser evil. With the help of the Social Democrats and several other parties, the government survived various motions of no confidence on 16 October. On the same day, the Reichstag adjourned until February 1932.

== Members ==
The members of Heinrich Brüning's second cabinet were as follows:

Portfolio	Minister	Took office	Left office	Party
Chancellor	Heinrich Brüning	10 October 1931	1 June 1932	Centre
Vice-Chancellor	Hermann Dietrich	10 October 1931	1 June 1932	DStP
Foreign Affairs	Heinrich Brüning (acting)	10 October 1931	1 June 1932	Centre
Interior	Wilhelm Groener (acting)	10 October 1931	1 June 1932	Independent
Justice	Curt Joël	10 October 1931	1 June 1932	Independent
Labour	Adam Stegerwald	10 October 1931	1 June 1932	Centre
Reichswehr	Wilhelm Groener	10 October 1931	1 June 1932	Independent
Economic Affairs	Hermann Warmbold	10 October 1931	5 May 1932	Independent
Economic Affairs	Ernst Trendelenburg (acting)	6 May 1932	1 June 1932	DStP
Finance	Hermann Dietrich	10 October 1931	1 June 1932	DStP
Food and Agriculture	Martin Schiele	10 October 1931	1 June 1932	CNBL
Transport	Gottfried Treviranus	10 October 1931	1 June 1932	KVP
Postal Affairs	Georg Schätzel	10 October 1931	1 June 1932	BVP
Without portfolio	Hans Schlange-Schöningen	1 October 1930	1 June 1932	CNBL

== Presidential cabinet ==
Initially, the Brüning government acted somewhat leniently towards the National Socialists in the hope of persuading Adolf Hitler and his party to abandon their radical opposition in favor of collaboration in the government. The attempt at rapprochement with the NSDAP provoked incomprehension among both the Social Democrats and representatives of the governing parties. Brüning then distanced himself from the Nazis in a radio address on 8 December 1931.

On the same day, the Fourth Emergency Ordinance to Secure the Economy and Finances and to Protect Domestic Peace was issued following difficult negotiations in the cabinet. For reasons of foreign policy that were related to Germany's war reparations payments, the government stuck to its deflationary economic course. It proposed neither an active economic program nor credit-financed job creation measures. Both wages and prices were lowered. The government hoped that overall purchasing power would not decline sharply and that German products could be sold abroad more easily. The interest rate was lowered only cautiously, and the sales tax was increased. Both measures had, if anything, negative effects on the economy. The emergency decree also tried to counteract radicalization at home by imposing a general ban on uniforms for political organizations.

The central project of the Brüning government was to end reparations payments. At its request, the special advisory committee at the Bank for International Settlements in Basel, Switzerland, deliberated on the question of whether Germany could still meet its obligations in accordance with the recently adopted Young Plan. The committee proposed far-reaching steps towards a total revision of reparations payments and an international conference to be held at Lausanne, Switzerland. On 9 January 1932, Brüning declared that after the Hoover moratorium on payments expired on 1 July, Germany would not be able to resume its reparations payments. The Lausanne conference, which took place in June and July 1932, after the end of the Brüning cabinet, led to a de facto end to reparations payments.

On 26 February 1932, a vote of no confidence by the NSDAP, DVP and DNVP against Brüning's economic policy failed. On 29 March President Hindenburg issued an emergency decree allowing the government to make budgetary decisions without the participation of the Reichstag.

In April, at the Conference for the Reduction and Limitation of Armaments in Geneva, Brüning called for the lifting of the disarmament provisions of the Versailles Treaty affecting Germany. Due to French resistance, his proposal was not accepted.

== End of the Brüning government ==
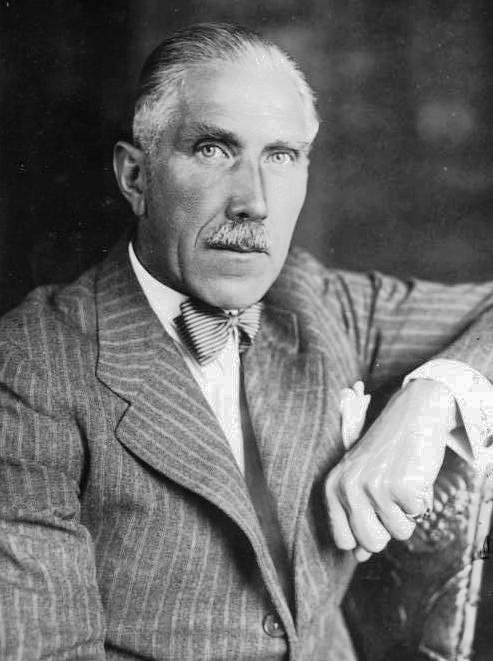
Franz von Papen, who succeeded Brüning as chancellor

As a result of the government's subordination of the fight against mass unemployment to the goal of ending reparations payments and because there was no proper state program to create jobs, the Brüning government increasingly lost the confidence of the population.

More problematic for the government was that Brüning gradually lost Hindenburg's confidence. One factor, somewhat ironically, was Hindenburg's successful re-election to the presidency on 10 April 1932. He resented the fact that he owed his re-election in part to the Centre Party and SPD, something for which he personally faulted Brüning.

On the basis of an emergency decree by the President, the Brüning cabinet issued a ban on the Nazi Sturmabteilung (SA) and Schutzstaffel (SS) on 13 April 1932. In doing so, the government bowed to pressure from various state governments, especially Prussia's, which demanded a vigorous state defense against the NSDAP's violent activities. Hindenburg had been reluctant to give his consent for the step and was angry that the Reichsbanner Schwarz-Rot-Gold, a pro-democracy paramilitary organization supported primarily by the SPD, had not also been banned. Kurt von Schleicher took advantage of the situation to work against Brüning and especially Wilhelm Groener, who was both Reichswehr and Interior minister. He was forced to resign on 12 May. Schleicher at that point was negotiating behind the scenes for a new government that would include the NSDAP. He and other military leaders wanted to create an authoritarian government backed by the military and believed that the Nazis could be tamed and used for support. Hitler made the ouster of Brüning, the lifting of the ban on the SA/SS and new election conditions for his ultimately unrealized participation in the government.

The final factor in Brüning's fall was the dispute over Eastern Aid. The government planned to buy overly indebted estates in the eastern parts of Germany, divide them up and give the land to settlers. The plan met with resistance from the estate owners, who protested to Hindenburg – himself the owner of an estate in the east – against what they called "agrarian Bolshevism". Influenced as well by his close associates, Hindenburg decided to dismiss Brüning.

When Brüning was received by Hindenburg on 30 May 1932, he reported that the President "snatched up a sheet of paper that was at hand and read it out [...] The government, because it was unpopular, would no longer receive his permission to issue new emergency decrees; the President would also no longer agree to personnel changes. When the Chancellor then declared that he would call the cabinet together and have it decide on its resignation, the President urged him to hurry. The following day, Brüning's government resigned." On 1 June 1932, Hindenburg appointed Franz von Papen chancellor to succeed Brüning at the insistence of Schleicher.

== Bibliography ==
- Brüning, Heinrich (1972). Memoiren 1918–1932 (in German). Vol. 2. Munich: Deutsche Taschenbuch Verlag.
- Childers, Thomas (1983). The Nazi Voter: The Social Foundations of Fascism in Germany, 1919–1933. University of North Carolina Press. ISBN 0807815705.
- Grevelhörster, Ludger (2000). Kleine Geschichte der Weimarer Republik 1918–1933 [A Brief History of the Weimar Republic 1918–1933] (in German). Münster: Aschendorff. ISBN 9783402053638.
- Reuth, Ralf Georg (2005). Hitler. Eine politische Biographie (in German). Munich: Piper Verlag.
- Winkler, Heinrich August (1993). Weimar 1918–1933. Die Geschichte der ersten deutschen Demokratie [Weimar 1918–1933. The History of Germany's First Democracy] (in German). Munich: C. H. Beck. p. 429 f. ISBN 3-406-37646-0.
- Winkler, Heinrich August (2014). Der lange Weg nach Westen. Deutsche Geschichte I [The Long Road to the West. German History I] (in German). Munich: C. H. Beck. p. 505. ISBN 978-3-406-66049-8.
