= Curt Joël =

German politician

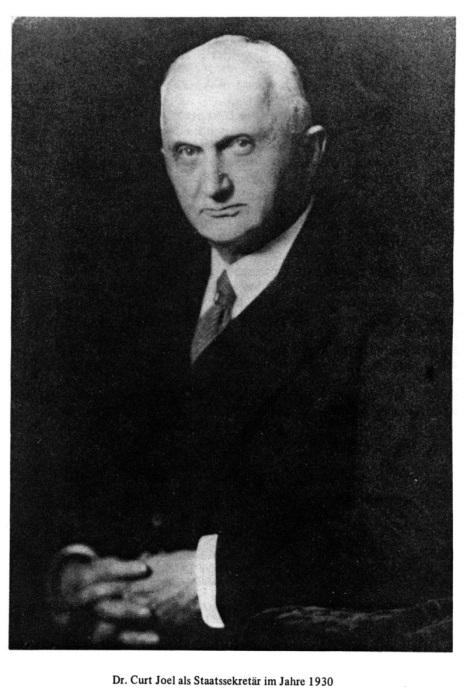
- Reich Minister of Justice Curt Joël, 1930

Reich Minister of Justice
- In office 5 December 1930 – 30 May 1932
- Chancellor: Heinrich Brüning
- Preceded by: Johann Viktor Bredt
- Succeeded by: Franz Gürtner
- Acting; 15 April 1924 – 15 December 1924
- Chancellor: Wilhelm Marx
- Preceded by: Erich Emminger
- Succeeded by: Josef Frenken

Personal details
- Born: 18 January 1865 Greiffenberg, Kingdom of Prussia
- Died: 15 April 1945 (aged 80) Berlin, Nazi Germany
- Party: Independent
- Occupation: Civil servant, jurist

Curt Walter Joël (18 January 1865 – 15 April 1945) was a German jurist and civil servant. He was the senior civil servant in the Ministry of Justice for much of the 1920s and early 1930s, during the Weimar Republic era. Joël also served as acting Minister of Justice and in 1931/32 was a member of Heinrich Brüning's second cabinet.

== Early life ==
Curt Walter Joël was born on 18 January 1865 at Greiffenberg, Silesia, in what was then the Kingdom of Prussia. His father, Hermann (1827–80), was a lawyer and notary there (later at Bromberg) and came from a family of Jewish merchants from Danzig. Curt Joël's mother was Else (née Pollack, 1843–90), also from a family of Jewish merchants. After her husband's death, she married Theodor Römpler in 1883, founder and head physician at the family-owned Sanatorium Görbersdorf (Waldenburg, Silesia). Curt's siblings included Eugen (1863–1911), Dr. med. and after 1902 head of the Sanatorium Görbersdorf, Arthur (b. 1866), textile merchant and manufacturer at New York, and Walter (1867–1947), president of a Finanzgericht (Fiscal Court). His cousin Otto Joel (1856–1916) was founder and long-serving president of Banca Commerciale Italiana.

Curt Joël married Vally von Dressler (1880-1968) at Breslau in 1899. They had a daughter and a son, Günther Joël.

== Early career ==
He studied law at Jena, Freiburg im Breisgau and Berlin. From 1899, he was a prosecutor at Landgerichte in Hanover and Berlin, 1903–06 at the Kammergericht and 1906-08 judicial aide at the Reichsanwaltschaft at Leipzig. In 1908, he was promoted to Geheimer Regierungsrat and Vortragender Rat at the Reichsjustizamt (Imperial Ministry of Justice).

At the outbreak of World War I, Joël served as Landwehroffizier at the counterintelligence department of the Stellvertretender Generalstab in Berlin. From early 1915 until November 1917, he was a Hauptmann (captain), in charge of a department in occupied Belgium (known as the Generalgouvernement) and head of the Generalgouvernement's Zentralpolizeistelle (police headquarters). He also remained active in counterintelligence. In 1915, he fought determinedly, but unsuccessfully, against the execution of British citizen Edith Cavell, who had been found guilty of treason.

In October 1917, he became a Direktor at the Reichsjustizamt and subsequently was named deputy Bundesratsbevollmächtigter of Prussia (representative in the Bundesrat). In early 1918, Joël resumed work on a reform of criminal law he had previously worked on in 1908 (early draft) and since 1911 as a member of the Große Strafrechtskommission. Together with three co-workers he finished the reform draft in 1919.

== Career in the Weimar Republic ==
By then, the Empire had been replaced with a republic but Joël continued to work at the Reichsjustizministerium (Ministry of Justice) and in early 1920 became Unterstaatssekretär (under-secretary) and on 1 April 1920 Staatssekretär. During the Kapp-Lüttwitz Putsch of March 1920, Joël organised a conference of the ministerial under-secretaries and then went to Kapp to deliver their unanimous declaration against the putschists and in favour of the legitimate government.

He served a total of eleven ministers and 15 cabinets, from a variety of political backgrounds. Never a member of any party himself, Joël represented the unpolitical, technocratic civil servant. He worked to keep the ministry free of party politics, which contributed to the high esteem in which the ministry was held by other ministries, state governments and the parliament. During this time he served repeatedly as acting minister of justice, first in the cabinet of chancellor Wilhelm Marx. Joël was particularly close to Gustav Radbruch, Kuno von Westarp, Heinrich Brüning and Wilhelm Kahl, though he had the trust of other particularly Paul Von Hindenburg and Friedrich Ebert.

Though Joël personally never joined a political party he was a committed reactionary serving as the DNVP’s steward throughout his ministerships.

However, in October 1931, at that point again acting minister since 1930, Joël acceded to Brüning's request to become Minister of Justice in his second cabinet. The cabinet resigned in June 1932 and Joël then refused the offer by Franz von Papen to join its successor, since he did not want to be a party to the planned lifting of the legal ban on Sturmabteilung and Schutzstaffel, which he had earlier co-signed into law.

== Nazi Rule ==
Joël's Jewish ancestry did cause him some suffering during Nazi rule, but his powerful friends shielded him from becoming a victim of the Holocaust.

Joël died on 15 April 1945 in Berlin.
