= Ministry of the Reichswehr =

German interwar defence ministry

- Reichswehrministerium (German)
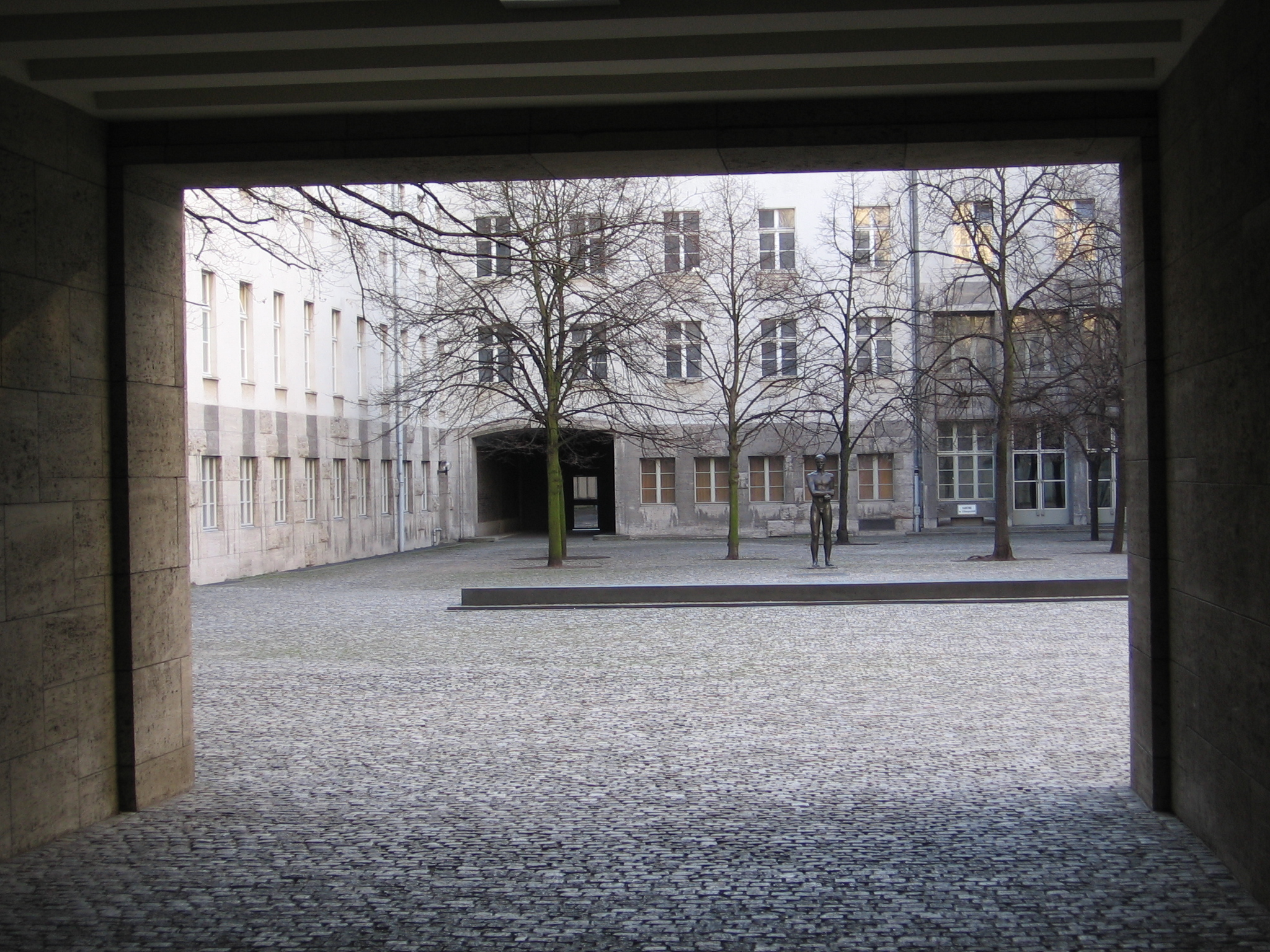
- Entrance to the Bendlerblock.

Ministry overview
- Formed: October 1919
- Preceding Ministry: Prussian Ministry of War
- Dissolved: 4 February 1938 (Note: The ministry was formally revived in April 1945, when Karl Dönitz was named as Minister of War in Hitler's testament.)
- Superseding Ministry: Oberkommando der Wehrmacht
- Jurisdiction: Government of the Weimar Republic (until 1934); Government of Nazi Germany (from 1934)
- Headquarters: Bendlerblock, Berlin
- Minister responsible: Minister of Defence

The Ministry of the Reichswehr (German: Reichswehrministerium) was the defence ministry of Germany from 1919 to 1938 during the Weimar Republic and early Nazi Germany periods. It was responsible for the Reichswehr under the leadership of the Minister of Defence and based in the Bendlerblock building in Berlin.

The Ministry of the Reichswehr was formed from the Prussian Ministry of War in the aftermath of World War I as part of a centralisation of the armed forces to Berlin from the states of Germany. Its longest serving Weimar-era Defence Ministers were the civilian Otto Gessler (almost 8 years) and General Wilhelm Groener (4 years). It was renamed the Reich Ministry of War (Reichskriegsministerium) in 1935 under the Nazis and led by General Werner von Blomberg as the Minister of War. It was abolished in 1938 and replaced with the Oberkommando der Wehrmacht (Armed Forces High Command) under the direct command of Adolf Hitler.

== History ==
=== Formation ===
On 6 March 1919, the Weimar National Assembly – Germany's post-war interim parliament, which was tasked with passing necessary laws while it drafted a constitution for the Republic – enacted the Law on the Formation of a Provisional National Defence Force (Gesetz über die Bildung einer vorläufigen Reichswehr). It authorized the president of Germany to:

disband the existing Army and to form a provisional Reichswehr, which will protect the Reich's borders, enforce the orders of the Reich government and maintain peace and order within the Reich until the new Armed Forces (Wehrmacht), which is to be organized by Reich law, is created.

The position of defence minister was established early in 1919 and filled by Gustav Noske on 13 February. On 20 August, President Friedrich Ebert ordered that the Reichswehr Ministry take over from the federal states' war ministries on 1 October, although it was not until 8 November 1919 that the new ministry was officially opened. The heads of Army Command (Heeresleitung) and the Admiralty – which became Navy Command (Marineleitung) on 15 July 1920 – were subordinate to the defence minister. The Ministry was for the most part made up of members from the states' war ministries, with the majority coming from the Prussian Ministry of War.

The Prussian armed forces remained under the command of General Walther Reinhardt, the Prussian Minister of War, until the Ministry was disbanded on 30 September 1919. Reinhardt sat on the first two cabinets of the Weimar Republic as a non-voting member until 30 September, as did Admiral Adolf von Trotha in a similar capacity for the Admiralty until 27 March 1920, when the Bauer cabinet resigned.

As a covert replacement for the German Empire's General Staff (OHL), which had been banned by the Treaty of Versailles (Article 160), the Truppenamt was formed within the Reichswehr Ministry in October 1919. General Hans von Seeckt was its first head.

The Reich law to create a new Armed Forces, which had been referred to in the 1919 Law on the Formation of a Provisional National Defence Force, was promulgated as the Defence Act (Wehrgesetz) on 23 March 1921 by the Weimar Reichstag. It formally established the Reichswehr in compliance with the limits set in the Treaty of Versailles. In § 8 [2], it stated that: "the Reich President is the supreme commander of the entire Armed Forces. Under him, the Armed Forces minister exercises command over the entire Armed Forces." Paragraph 10 also provided that:

An Army Board (Kammer) and a Navy Board, whose members are elected by secret ballot, are to be established at the Reichswehr Ministry as advisory and expert bodies. [2] The Army and Navy Boards are directly subordinate to the defence minister. In § 12, the war ministries of Bavaria, Saxony and Württemberg were dissolved, and command authority was concentrated in the hand of the defence minister.

A Minister's Office (Ministeramt), which served as a top military authority between the minister and the army and navy leadership, was set up on 1 March 1929.

=== Under the Third Reich ===
Just over two years after Adolf Hitler and the Nazi Party rose to power, the Proclamation of Military Sovereignty (Verkündung der Wehrhoheit ) of 16 March 1935 created a new Oberkommando der Luftwaffe (OKL) under the Air Ministry and turned the Heeresleitung into the Oberkommando des Heeres (OKH) and the Marineleitung into the Oberkommando der Marine (OKM). The Minister's Office was renamed the Wehrmacht Office. The Defence Act (Wehrgesetz ) of 21 May 1935 made the Führer and chancellor (Hitler) supreme commander of the Wehrmacht. Under him, the renamed minister of war (Reichskriegsminister ) became commander-in-chief of the Wehrmacht (§ 3).

As a result of the Blomberg–Fritsch affair, Hitler took over as commander-in-chief of the Wehrmacht by decree on 4 February 1938. Under the same decree, the functions of the Ministry of War were taken over by the High Command of the Wehrmacht (Oberkommando der Wehrmacht, OKW). The Ministry of War ceased to exist at that point.

Karl Dönitz was named as Minister of War in Hitler's testament.

== Lists of officials ==
=== Defence ministers ===
No.	Portrait	Name (born–died)	Term of office			Political party	Cabinet	Ref.
No.	Portrait	Name (born–died)	Took office	Left office	Time in office	Political party	Cabinet	Ref.
Minister of Defence
1	Gustav Noske	Gustav Noske (1868–1946)	13 February 1919	22 March 1920	1 year, 38 days	SPD	Scheidemann; Bauer	
2	Otto Gessler	Otto Gessler (1875–1955)	27 March 1920	19 January 1928	7 years, 298 days	DDP	Müller I Fehrenbach; Wirth I − II; Cuno; Stresemann I − II; Marx I − II; Luther I − II; Marx III − IV	
3	Wilhelm Groener	Wilhelm Groener (1867–1939)	19 January 1928	30 May 1932	4 years, 132 days	Independent	Marx IV; Müller II; Brüning I − II	
4	Kurt von Schleicher	Kurt von Schleicher (1882–1934)	1 June 1932	28 January 1933	243 days	Independent	Papen; Schleicher	
5	Werner von Blomberg	Werner von Blomberg (1878–1946)	29 January 1933	21 May 1935	2 years, 113 days	Independent	Hitler	
Minister of War
1	Werner von Blomberg	Werner von Blomberg (1878–1946)	21 May 1935	27 January 1938	2 years, 251 days	Independent	Hitler	
2	Karl Dönitz	Karl Dönitz (1891–1980)	30 April 1945	23 May 1945	23 days	NSDAP	Goebbels; Schwerin von Krosigk	

Flag of the Minister of Defence (1933–1935)

Flag for the Minister of War and Commander-in-Chief of the Wehrmacht (23 June 1935 – 5 October 1935)

Flag for the Minister of War and Commander-in-Chief of the Wehrmacht (5 October 1935 – 27 January 1938)

=== Ministerial office heads ===
No.	Portrait	Name (born–died)	Term of office			Ref.
No.	Portrait	Name (born–died)	Took office	Left office	Time in office	Ref.
Heads of the Ministeramt (German: Chefs des Ministeramtes)
1	Kurt von Schleicher	General der Infanterie; Kurt von Schleicher (1882–1934)	1 February 1929	1 June 1932	3 years, 121 days	
2	Ferdinand von Bredow	Generalmajor; Ferdinand von Bredow (1884–1934)	1 June 1932	30 January 1933	243 days	
3	Walter von Reichenau	Oberst; Walter von Reichenau (1884–1942)	1 February 1933	1 February 1934	1 year, 0 days	
Heads of the Wehrmachtamt (German: Chefs des Wehrmachtamtes)
1	Walter von Reichenau	Generalmajor; Walter von Reichenau (1884–1942)	1 February 1934	30 September 1935	1 year, 243 days	
2	Wilhelm Keitel	Generalmajor; Wilhelm Keitel (1882–1946)	1 October 1935	4 February 1938	2 years, 127 days	

=== Army heads ===
No.	Portrait	Name (born–died)	Term of office			Ref.
No.	Portrait	Name (born–died)	Took office	Left office	Time in office	Ref.
Heads of the Army Command (German: Chefs der Heeresleitung)
1	Walther Reinhardt	Generalmajor; Walther Reinhardt (1872–1930)	13 September 1919	22 March 1920	191 days	
2	Hans von Seeckt	Generaloberst; Hans von Seeckt (1866–1936)	26 March 1920	9 October 1926	6 years, 197 days	
3	Wilhelm Heye	Generaloberst; Wilhelm Heye (1869–1947)	9 October 1926	31 October 1930	4 years, 22 days	
4	Kurt von Hammerstein-Equord	General der Infanterie; Kurt von Hammerstein-Equord (1878–1943)	1 November 1930	31 January 1934	3 years, 91 days	
5	Werner von Fritsch	General der Artillerie; Werner von Fritsch (1880–1939)	1 February 1934	1 June 1935	1 year, 120 days	
Commander-in-chief of the Army (German: Oberbefehlshaber des Heeres)
1	Werner von Fritsch	Generaloberst; Werner von Fritsch (1880–1939)	1 June 1935	4 February 1938	2 years, 248 days	

Flag of the Chef der Heeresleitung from 1925–1927.

Flag of the Chef der Heeresleitung from 1927–1933.

Flag of the Chef der Heeresleitung from 1927–1933.

Flag of the Oberbefehlshaber des Heeres from 1935–1941.

=== Navy heads ===
No.	Portrait	Name (born–died)	Term of office			Ref.
No.	Portrait	Name (born–died)	Took office	Left office	Time in office	Ref.
Chief of the Admiralty (German: Chef der Admiralität)
1	Adolf von Trotha	Vizeadmiral; Adolf von Trotha (1868–1940)	26 March 1919	22 March 1920	362 days	
–	William Michaelis	Konteradmiral; William Michaelis (1871–1948); Acting	22 March 1920	1 September 1920	163 days	
2	Paul Behncke	Vizeadmiral; Paul Behncke (1869–1937)	1 September 1920	14 September 1920	13 days	
Chief of the Naval Command (German: Chef der Marineleitung)
1	Paul Behncke	Vizeadmiral; Paul Behncke (1869–1937)	14 September 1920	1 October 1924	4 years, 17 days	
2	Hans Zenker	Vizeadmiral; Hans Zenker (1870–1932)	1 October 1924	30 September 1928	3 years, 365 days	
3	Erich Raeder	Vizeadmiral; Erich Raeder (1876–1960)	1 October 1928	1 June 1935	6 years, 243 days	
Commander-in-chief of the Navy (German: Oberbefehlshaber der Kriegsmarine)
1	Erich Raeder	Großadmiral; Erich Raeder (1876–1960)	1 June 1935	30 January 1943	7 years, 243 days	
