= Friedrich Syrup =

German politician (1881–1945)

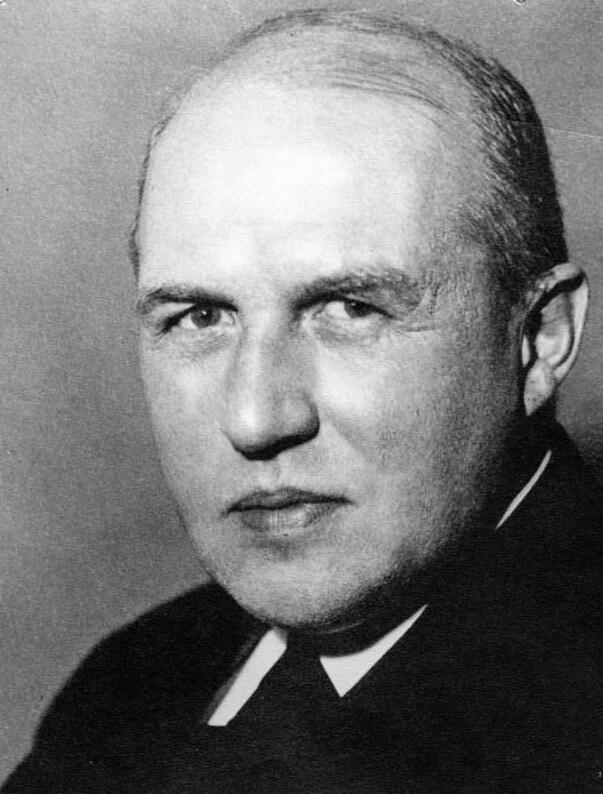
- Syrup in 1927

Reich Minister for Labour
- In office 3 December 1932 – 30 January 1933
- President: Paul von Hindenburg
- Chancellor: Kurt von Schleicher
- Preceded by: Hugo Schäffer
- Succeeded by: Franz Seldte

Personal details
- Born: Friedrich Heinrich Karl Syrup; 9 October 1881 Lüchow, German Empire
- Died: 31 August 1945 (aged 63) NKVD special camp Nr. 7, Sachsenhausen, Soviet occupation zone in Germany
- Party: Nazi Party
- Education: University of Rostock

Friedrich Heinrich Karl Syrup (9 October 1881 – c. 31 August 1945) was a German jurist and politician.

== Life ==
Syrup was born in Lüchow, Dannenberg district, in the Prussian Province of Hanover. The postal official's son studied engineering science as well as law and political science. In 1905, he joined the Prussian Industrial Inspection Service, staying until 1918, and making a name for himself in this time with various scientific publications on issues such as occupational health and safety and the work force's social status. In November 1918, Syrup was delegated by the Prussian Ministry for Trade and Industry to the Demobilization Ministry, where he was responsible for reintegrating former soldiers into civilian industrial life. While in this job, Syrup created the Reich Office for Work Placement, whose president he was appointed in 1920. From 1927 until the end of 1938, he was president of the Reich institution for Work Placement and Unemployment Insurance. When the central office of the hitherto autonomous institution was integrated into the Reich Ministry of Labour, Syrup was appointed State Secretary in this ministry.

In Kurt von Schleicher's cabinet, the last before Adolf Hitler's rise to power, Syrup was Reich Minister for Labour (independent); however, he was sent back to his old job by Hitler. Hermann Göring, in his capacity as Commissioner of the Four Year Plan, appointed Syrup in 1936 leader of the Geschäftsgruppe Arbeitseinsatz (Labour Deployment Business Group). After the 1938 Aktion Arbeitsscheu Reich, he ordered the fatigue duty of all jobless Jews in Germany. An appointed member of the Prussian State Council since 1939, on 2 May 1941 he attended the state secretary meeting on the Hunger Plan in preparation of the Operation Barbarossa invasion of the Soviet Union.

In 1941, Syrup suffered a complete breakdown. After a long illness, he took up work once again, but only part-time. This was the deciding factor in appointing the Gauleiter of Thuringia, Fritz Sauckel, to the General Plenipotentiary for Labour Deployment on 21 March 1942, effectively putting Syrup under Sauckel.

When the war ended, Syrup stayed in Berlin, although he could have fled. On 7 June 1945, he was deported to the NKVD special camp Nr. 7 in Sachsenhausen where he died a few months later.

== Works (selection) ==
- Arbeitseinsatz und Arbeitsbeschaffung / Friedrich Syrup. Berlin, [1939].
- Der Arbeitseinsatz und die Arbeitslosenhilfe in Deutschland / Friedrich Syrup. Berlin, 1936.
- Astigmatische Spiegelung im dreiaxigen Ellipsoid / presented by Friedrich Syrup. Rostock, Univ., Diss., 1905.
- Probleme des Arbeitsmarktes und der Arbeitslosenversicherung / Syrup. Cologne, 1930.

== Bequests ==
- Friedrich Syrup Collection at the Fachhochschule des Bundes für öffentliche Verwaltung, field of Labour Administration, SEAD-BA in Mannheim, (1,0 m), [*http://www.fh-arbeit.de/ FH der Bundesagentur für Arbeit]

== Literature ==
- Hundert Jahre staatliche Sozialpolitik 1839 -1939 : aus dem Nachlass von Friedrich Syrup / published by Julius Scheuble. Edited by Otto Neuloh. Stuttgart, 1957.
- Jürgen Nürnberger: Friedrich Syrup (1881-1945). Personalbibliografie. Ludwigshafen, [2006, in progress].
