= Hugo Schäffer =

German politician

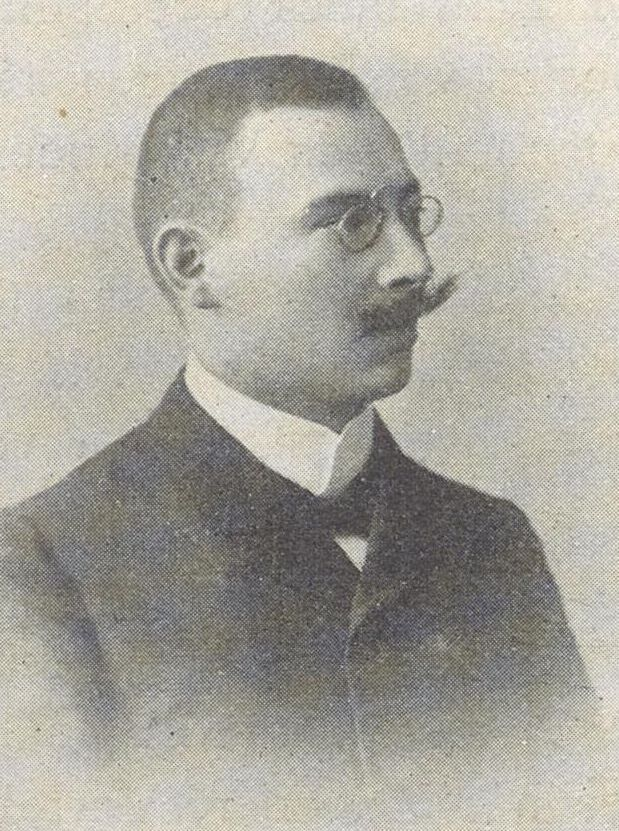
- Schäffer in a 1913 portrait.

Reich Minister for Labour
- In office 7 June 1932 – 17 November 1932
- President: Paul von Hindenburg
- Chancellor: Franz von Papen
- Preceded by: Hermann Warmbold
- Succeeded by: Friedrich Syrup

President of the Reich Insurance Office
- In office 1924–1942
- Preceded by: Paul Kaufmann
- Succeeded by: Peter Schmitt

Personal details
- Born: 13 June 1875 Edelfingen, Kingdom of Württemberg, German Empire
- Died: 25 August 1945 (aged 70) Stuttgart, Württemberg-Baden, Allied-occupied Germany
- Party: Non-partisan (?-1933); Nazi Party (1933-1945)

Hugo Schäffer (13 June 1875 - 25 August 1945) was a German politician. He was initially a non-partisan politician, as was then common, but joined the Nazi Party in 1933. He served as Reich Minister for Labour in Franz von Papen's cabinet for 163 days in 1932 when he was ousted after Papen could not secure the Reichstag following the November 1932 German federal election.

Before and after his service as minister, he served as President of the Reich Insurance Office (RVA) from 1924 to 1932 and again from 1933 to 1942. In this role, upon the Nazi rise to power, he was a Nazi collaborator, becoming co-editor of a Nazi journal and part of the Nazi student council.

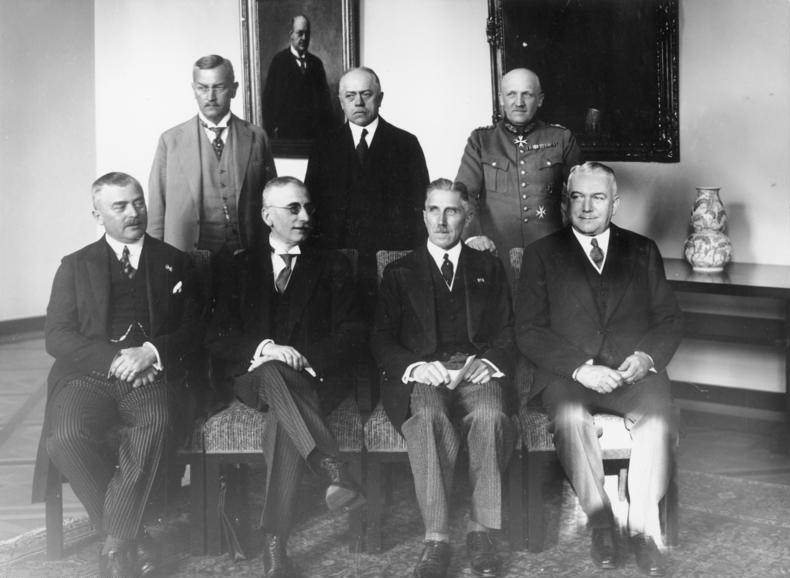
The cabinet of Papen in 1932, Schäffer was not in this picture.

== Early life ==
Schäffer was born on 13 June 1875 in Edelfingen, a village near Mergentheim. His father, Karl, was an evangelical pastor and his mother Karoline (née Öhm) was from an Old Frankish family who lived in Rothenburg ob der Tauber. He studied in a Latin school in Göppingen, and then he attended gymnasiums in Blaubeuren and Maulbronn. From 1893 to 1894 he did his one year of voluntary military service. In 1893 he started studying theology in Tübingen and joined the student fraternity called the Tübingen Royal Society Roigel. He decided to switch to law and political science in 1895 and started attending the University of Tübingen and studied in Berlin, graduating in 1901 with a doctorate. In 1899 and 1901 he passed the higher Württemberg financial service examinations. He started working at the company Friedrich Krupp in Essen in 1901, and worked there until 1902.

He started working in the Württemberg administrative service in 1902, and worked as a bailiff in Öhringen and Oberamt Gmünd until 1905. In 1905 he became an unskilled worker for the Württemberg Central Office for Trade and in 1906 he became a government assessor for the Württemberg Ministry of the Interior. He then reached a senior position as chief bailiff in Künzelsau from 1907 to 1909.

In 1909 he was promoted to government councillor of the Württemberg Ministry of the Interior. In 1916 he became deputy plenipotentiary to the Bundesrat. He was then Ministerial Director in the Ministry of the Interior in 1919 and deputy plenipotentiary to the Committee of States. He served his third position as a deputy plenipotentiary to the Reichsrat in 1922. However, later that year, he returned to the company Friedrich Krupp to become its director which he did for a year, specifically in charge of finances after the hyperinflation period.

== Political career ==
=== Reich Insurance Office ===
In 1924 he became President of the Reich Insurance Office for the first time. He left the office after he was appointed minister, but returned in 1933 alongside being appointed President of the Reich Supply Court.

=== Reich Minister of Labour ===
On 6 June 1932 he was confirmed as Reich Minister of Labour as part of Papen's cabinet. Schäffer later told trade union representatives that he had reservations about accepting the offer, but accepted after Papen threatened to dissolve the ministry and merge it with the Federal Ministry for Economics.

He proposed Prussian Privy Councillor Ernst Kübler as State Secretary for his ministry, but it did not go through. Schäffer considered himself a "man of the industry" and so he fulfilled wishes from leading industries in the country. In an attempt to gain supporters, he stressed the government's unemployment relief plan before the Christian trade unions in Düsseldorf in September 1932.

He was dropped from the cabinet after the November 1932 German federal election alongside Papen himself.

=== Nazi collaboration ===
He joined the NSDAP on 1 May 1933. He was co-editor of the magazine Gesundes Volk, which was sponsored by the Reich Committee for Public Health Service. He was also in the National Socialist Association of Legal Professionals and the NS Student Council of the RVA.

== Death ==
He died on 25 August 1945 in Stuttgart, which was then under American occupation.

== Honours and awards ==
- 1911 - Knight of the Friedrich Order
- 1912 - 3rd Class Order of the Prussian Crown
- 1916 - Knight of the Order of the Württemberg Crown
- 1918 - 2nd Class Iron Cross
- 1934 - Honorary doctorate from the University of Cologne
