= Franz Bracht =

German jurist and politician (1877–1933)

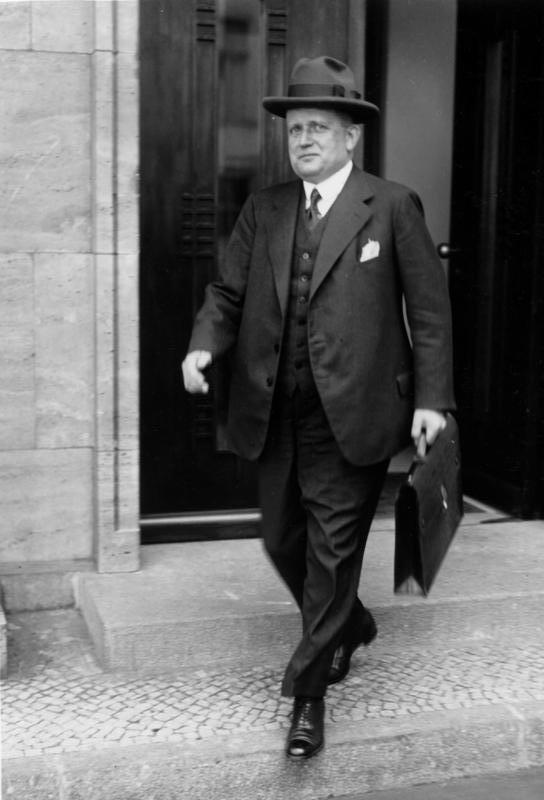
- Bracht leaving the Reich Chancellery, 1932

Reichsminister of the Interior
- In office 3 December 1932 – 30 January 1933
- President: Paul von Hindenburg
- Chancellor: Kurt von Schleicher
- Preceded by: Wilhelm Freiherr von Gayl
- Succeeded by: Wilhelm Frick

Personal details
- Born: Clemens Emil Franz Bracht; 23 November 1877 Berlin, German Empire
- Died: 26 November 1933 (aged 56) Berlin, Nazi Germany
- Party: Centre Party
- Education: University of Berlin
- Occupation: Lawyer

Clemens Emil Franz Bracht (23 November 1877 – 26 November 1933) was a German jurist and politician.

Born in Berlin, he studied law at the University of Würzburg and the University of Berlin. He joined the Centre Party and on 18 December 1924 became Supreme Burgomaster (Oberbürgermeister) of Essen. After German Chancellor Franz von Papen and President Paul von Hindenburg ousted the elected government of Prussia and made Papen Prussian Reich commissioner in the Prussian coup d'état, Bracht was appointed a "Deputy Commissioner" for the Interior in Prussia on 27 July 1932. He left the Centre Party and resigned as Burgomaster on 31 October 1932.

On 29 October 1932 he had become a Minister without portfolio in Papen's cabinet. Under Chancellor Kurt von Schleicher he briefly served as Reich Minister of the Interior from 3 December 1932. He had to resign when Hindenburg appointed Hitler Chancellor on 30 January 1933.
