= Hermann Warmbold =

German politician (1876–1976)

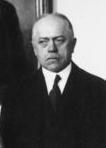
- Warmbold in 1932 at a meeting of Papen's cabinet.

Reich Minister of Economics
- In office 10 October 1931 – 6 May 1932
- President: Paul von Hindenburg
- Chancellor: Heinrich Brüning
- Preceded by: Ernst Trendelenburg
- Succeeded by: Ernst Trendelenburg (acting)
- In office 1 June 1932 – 28 January 1933
- Chancellor: Franz von Papen; Kurt von Schleicher
- Preceded by: Ernst Trendelenburg (acting)
- Succeeded by: Alfred Hugenberg

Reich Minister of Labour (acting)
- In office 1 June 1932 – 6 June 1932
- Chancellor: Franz von Papen
- Preceded by: Adam Stegerwald
- Succeeded by: Hugo Schäffer

Personal details
- Born: 21 April 1876 Klein Himstedt, Kingdom of Prussia, German Empire
- Died: 11 March 1976 (aged 99) Tegernsee, Bavaria, West Germany
- Party: Independent
- Spouse: Eleonore Wagemann (m. 1923)

Hermann Warmbold (21 April 1876 – 11 March 1976) — was a German independent politician and academic who served as Reich Minister of Economics during the Weimar Republic from 1931 to 1933, with a brief break in 1932.

Initially a farmer, he eventually entered academia, specializing in agricultural economics. He initially entered politics for the Prussian state government as Minister of Agriculture. He was appointed Reich Minister of Economics in Heinrich Brüning's cabinet in 1931 upon pressure from I.G. Farben. During his time as minister, his primary focus was combatting the financial crisis in the republic as part of the Great Depression worldwide. After leaving the ministerial role, he served as provisional Reich Minister of Labour for 5 days. Warmbold then spent the rest of his career in obscurity, moving to Chile in 1945 to help the government led by Juan Antonio Ríos with agricultural affairs.

== Early life ==
Warmbold was born on 21 April 1876 Klein Himstedt, a village then near Söhlde, in the Kingdom of Prussia. He attended Gymnasium Andreanum, which was sponsored by the Evangelical-Lutheran Church of Hanover. He then studied at the universities of Göttingen and Bonn. From 1907 to 1911 he was the Secretary General of the Agricultural and Forestry Association in Lüneburg, and also worked as head of the Chamber of Agriculture in Hanover. After this, in 1911, he went to Estonia as an agricultural organizer and financial expert working for the Estonian Knighthood in Reval. During this time he also worked on an experimental farm in Reval. He returned to Germany in 1913, becoming the head of the Department of Economic Administration at the Agricultural University of Berlin.

Warmbold was a reserve soldier for the 7th Guards Infantry Regiment during World War One.

He was the director of the University of Hohenheim for two years from 1917 to 1919. Alongside this he was a Full Professor of Agricultural Economics from 1915 to 1919. During his time as director, he brought Margarete von Wrangell, the first female full professor at a German university, to the university after she fled due to the October Revolution. At the university he also set up an advisory service for farmers and developed a more efficient system for grassland, which became famous internationally.

== Political career ==
=== Early political career ===
From 1919 to 1921 he was Ministerial Director in the Prussian Ministry of Agriculture, Estates and Forestry. Warmbold was then from 21 April to 7 November 1921 Minister of Agriculture in Adam Stegerwald's ministry of the Prussian state government. (Note: The ministry collapsed and resigned on 1 November 1921, but business was continued until Otto Braun's ministry took over.) After leaving he became a member of the board of Anilin-und Sodafabrik. He was also a board member of I.G. Farben from 1926 to 1931. Carl Bosch released Warmbold from the board of Farben for him to become minister.

=== Minister of Economics ===
==== First term ====
On 10 October 1931 he was appointed Minister of Economics for the first time in Heinrich Brüning's cabinet. Warmbold was appointed because of IG Farben, who pressured Brüning to respond to the collapse of Germany's banks by providing credit-financed relief to the German industry. He was appointed during the financial crisis in the Weimar Republic as part of the Great Depression. In a meeting with the Economic Advisory Council soon after he said it was "difficult to determine whether the crisis had its causes on the money side or on the goods side", and he stated a main priority was to prevent the turnover of goods from shrinking due to contractions with trade in foreign countries as a result of the depression.

Prior to this, on 3 August 1931, he proposed stimulating the economy with short-term domestic loans. He also responded with ideas similar to that of the Reconstruction Finance Corporation of the United States, saying there needed to be immediate loans to the industry out of the treasury, which Paul von Hindenburg approved on 1 October.

He officially resigned on 6 May 1932, and it was speculated that he resigned due to ill health and to make way for Carl Friedrich Goerdeler, a member of the then opposition party of Alfred Hugenberg. However, he officially stated that it was a difference in opinion with Brüning over working hours and the planned savings premium bond.

==== Second term ====
He was appointed against minister later that same year under Franz von Papen. He was also the acting Reich Minister of Labour for 5 days until 6 June when Hugo Schäffer was appointed minister. Soon after, he was part of the delegation to the Lausanne Conference of 1932. To fund Papen's employment bill, which in the end cost $500,000,000, he embraced a reduction on interest rates on internal debt. He also criticized reparations payments from World War One as having hurt the agriculture of Germany. It was generally predicted that Warmbold would lost his spot as minister upon Papen resigning, but he retained his ministerial role in Kurt von Schleicher's cabinet starting 3 December 1932.

He said in January 1933 that he thought the Great Depression was nearly over, as evidenced by the gain in long-term German loans abroad. He resigned on 28 January 1933 upon Adolf Hitler becoming chancellor.

=== Later work ===
Upon the end of World War Two, Warmbold immigrated to Chile, working as an expert in agricultural economics. He was in the faculty of economic sciences at the University of Santiago, Chile.

== Personal life ==
He married Eleonore Wagemann, who was German Chilean, in December 1923. Wagemann was the sister of Ernst Wagemann, making him his brother-in-law, who proposed the Wagemann Plan in response to the Great Depression.

== Death ==
Warmbold died on 11 March 1976 in Tegernsee, West Germany at the age of 99.

== Honours and awards ==
- honorary doctorate from the University of Hohenheim
