= Gottfried Reinhold Treviranus (politician) =

German politician (1891–1971)

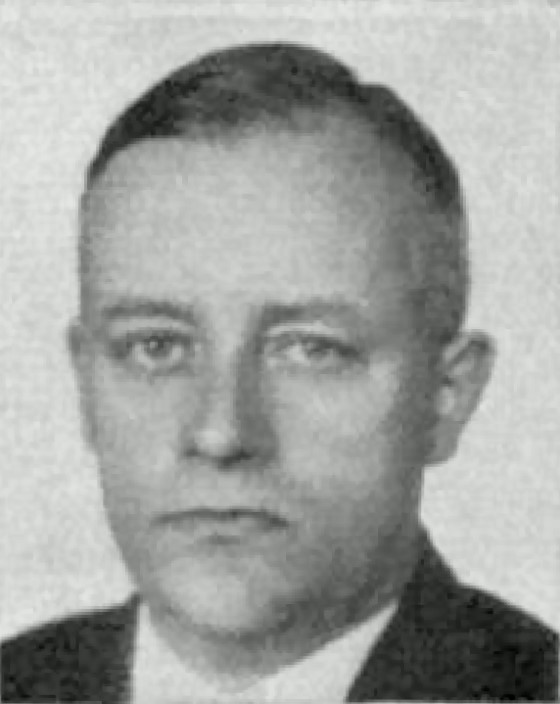
- Treviranus in 1930

Chairman of the Conservative People's Party
- In office 28 January 1930 – 15 December 1930
- Preceded by: Party established
- Succeeded by: Paul Lejeune-Jung

Reich Minister of Transport
- In office 10 October 1931 – 30 May 1932
- Chancellor: Heinrich Brüning
- Preceded by: Theodor von Guérard
- Succeeded by: Paul Freiherr von Eltz-Rübenach

Reich Minister without portfolio
- In office 30 September 1930 – 10 October 1931
- Chancellor: Heinrich Brüning

Reich Minister for the Occupied Territories
- In office 30 March 1930 – 30 September 1930
- Chancellor: Heinrich Brüning
- Preceded by: Joseph Wirth
- Succeeded by: Office abolished

Member of the Reichstag
- In office 27 May 1924 – 4 June 1932
- Constituency: Westfalen-Nord (1924-1930); National list (1930-1932)

Personal details
- Born: Gottfried Reinhold Treviranus; 20 March 1891 Schieder-Schwalenberg, Principality of Waldeck and Pyrmont, German Empire
- Died: 7 June 1971 (aged 80) Florence, Tuscany, Italy
- Party: Conservative People's Party (1930–1933)
- Other political affiliations: German National People's Party (until 1930)
- Occupation: Politician

Military service
- Allegiance: German Empire
- Branch/service: Imperial German Navy
- Years of service: 1912–1919
- Rank: Kapitänleutnant
- Battles/wars: World War I Battle of Jutland

Gottfried Reinhold Treviranus (20 March 1891 – 7 June 1971) was a German naval officer, farmer and politician. Originally a member of the German National People's Party, he later split from it to help form the Conservative People's Party. He served in both of Chancellor Heinrich Brüning's cabinets: in the first cabinet (March – October 1930) as Minister for the Occupied Territories, and then (October 1930 – October 1931) as Minister without Portfolio; in the second cabinet (October 1931 – May 1932), he served as Minister of Transport.

== Early life ==
Born in 1891 to a middle-class family in the village of Schieder, he was the son of senior administrative official (Oberamtmann), leaseholder of a crown estate and member of the Prussian House of Representatives Heinrich Hermann Treviranus (1866–1937) and his Scottish wife Margret Williamina Maria, née Stewart. He had four brothers and sister Margaret Alma Henriette who would marry Kurt Brennecke on 5 October 1918 in Varenholz (Lippe).

After graduation (Abitur) in 1909, he became an officer in the Imperial German Navy from 1912 to 1919, commanding a torpedo boat, later a minesweeper during World War 1, holding the rank of Kapitänleutnant. After leaving the navy, he studied agriculture and in 1921 became director of the Free State of Lippe's Chamber of Agriculture. He was married to Elisabeth Dryander, a travel writer. He had a son in 1919, Henry Stewart Treviranus.

== Career ==
=== Party politician (1924 to 1930) ===
Having already joined the Stahlhelm, in 1924 Treviranus was elected for the German National People's Party (DNVP) to the Reichstag. From 1925 to 1929 he also was a member of the Landtag of the Free State of Lippe and served as the head of the DNVP's parliamentary group there. It was largely due to his influence that the DNVP served in government after the December 1924 election.

As a representative of the moderate wing of the DNVP, he rejected the views extreme right of the DNVP, led by Alfred Hugenberg who became party chairman in 1928. Treviranus had long disliked Hugenberg due to Hugenberg's anti-catholicism, social darwinism, and his refusal to work with more moderate parties. Once Hugenberg became chairman of the DNVP in October 1928, conflict became inevitable. In the summer of 1929, Treviranus together with Hans Schlange-Schöningen was one of two prominent DNVP Reichstag deputies who resigned from the party's caucus in protest against the Young Plan referendum bill which they called irresponsible in the extreme, to be joined shortly afterwards by the former chairman Kuno von Westarp and another 20 DNVP Reichstag members leaving the party and forming the more moderate Conservative People's Party (KVP).

Treviranus politically supported a center-right government coalition. His goal was to align the KVP coalition with the moderate right. The center-right alliance should conduct comprehensive reforms. With this objective, Treviranus had built close relationships and had good contacts.

Treviranus played a significant role in the development of Brüning's government in March 1930. In December 1929, he had participated in preliminary discussions with Brüning, Kurt von Schleicher, Defence Minister Wilhelm Groener and President Hindenburg's head of office Otto Meissner, at the home of his national conservative party friend Friedrich Wilhelm Freiherr von Willisen. Hindenburg gave Brüning the task of forming a cabinet that would govern without the Social Democrats (SPD).

=== Government minister (1930 to 1932) ===
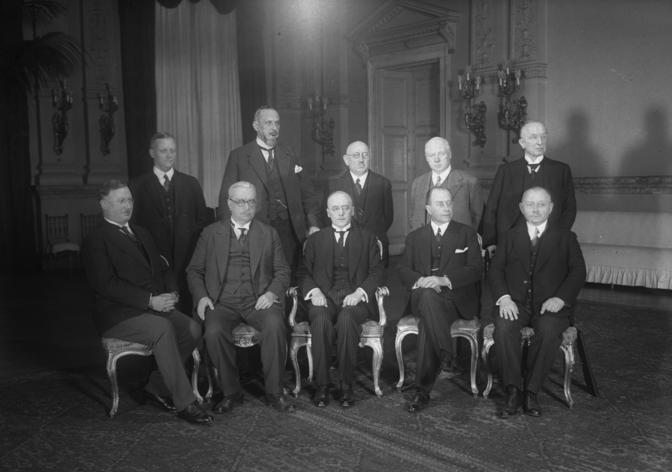
March 1930: The Brüning cabinet's first meeting in the Reich Chancellory in Wilhelmstrasse, Berlin. Sitting left to right: Minister of the Interior Joseph Wirth (Zentrum), Minister of Economic Affairs Hermann Dietrich (DDP), Chancellor Brüning (Zentrum), Foreign Minister Julius Curtius (DVP), Minister Georg Schätzel (BVP); Standing Left to right: Minister for the Occupied Territories Treviranus (KVP), Minister of Justice Johann Viktor Bredt (Wirtschaftspartei), Labour Minister Adam Stegerwald (Zentrum), Minister of Finance Paul Moldenhauer (DVP), Minister of Transport Theodor von Guérard (Zentrum)

Treviranus' first position in the new government was as Minister for the Occupied Territories, i.e. those parts of the Rhineland under French and Belgian occupation. But Treviranus sparked a diplomatic incident when in August 1930 he claimed he had resolve to regain ‘‘the lost regions in the East’’ in a speech. Subsequent pressure by France led to Bruning reshuffling his cabinet; Treviranus became Osthilfe Commissioner. After the occupation forces were withdrawn following the Young Plan in June 1930 he became Minister without Portfolio and he liaised with industry for Hindenburg and Brüning.

Before the General Election of 1930, Treviranus, in co-operation with politically influential military leaders, tried to re-organise the party system. He negotiated forming a loose middle-class electoral alliance to secure a majority for Brüning. This was funded by generous donations from big business but it was not successful.

From 9 October 1931 to 30 May 1932 he served in Brüning's second cabinet as Minister of Transport.

The government adopted a right wing nationalist stance during election campaigns and also at cabinet meetings. When French Foreign Minister Aristide Briand submitted a plan for a European Union it was rejected by the entire cabinet, and Treviranus said that the plan was an attack on the current German foreign policy at that time. In cabinet meetings he pushed to get the Versailles Treaty revised.

As Reich Commissioner for Eastern Germany, he was not successful in saving the country from bankruptcy and after this failure he resigned in August 1931.

The Brüning government went through a crisis in autumn 1931 with a worsening economic situation. Treviranus once again liaised between businesses and the government. On behalf of Brüning, he advised the major Ruhr industrialists Paul Reusch and Fritz Springorum not to collaborate with the National Socialists and German nationalists. However, the government fell when embarrassing documents about the behaviour of industry and the banks during the crisis came to light. In the parliamentary elections of 31 July 1932, Treviranus lost his seat as did his Conservative People's Party. Treviranus went into business; he became chairman of the Upper Silesian Bata shoe factory. His political career was over at the age of 41.

=== Escape and emigration ===
Although a staunch German nationalist, Treviranus was well known for disliking the Nazi leader Adolf Hitler. He was also Brüning's close friend and influential with the military. On 30 June 1934, Treviranus escaped the Night of the Long Knives. While in exile, he recalled that after lunch, a large number of police and SS men entered his house. His father answered their request to see "Treviranus". Their target and his daughter were playing tennis in the garden when she cried out "front of house full of Nazis!" He got away by jumping over the garden fence, and climbed into his car which had the key already in the ignition and drove away at high speed. Five rifle shots missed.

The assassins followed Treviranus but could not shoot him because he drove into town. He borrowed street clothes from a friend, then went to Schleicher's home and asked an SS guard what was happening. Learning that Schleicher had been shot, Treviranus abandoned his car outside the city to pretend that he had escaped into the countryside, took a taxi back into Berlin, was hidden by friends, and helped into the Netherlands by the same person who had helped Brüning to flee.

After a few days' stay in the Netherlands, he went to Great Britain. He met many well-known politicians including Churchill and Anthony Eden, at whose behest, he was asked about the character of Hitler and the Nazi movement. He warned of Hitler's aggressive expansion plan. He was formally expatriated in 1939 by the German Reich and went to Canada in 1943, where he worked as a farmer.

=== Later years (1945 to 1971) ===
After 1945, Treviranus advised the United States government on the allocation of loans to German companies as part of the Marshall Plan. In 1949, he returned to Germany. In the 1950s, his name became associated with a gambling scandal. In the 1960s, he worked as a defense lobbyist in the West German capital Bonn, where during this time he appeared in the investigative report on the HS-30 scandal. He had regular correspondence with the former Lippe state president Heinrich Drake from 1966 until his death.

== Death ==
He died on 7 June 1971 from heart failure near Florence on a road trip from his home in Taormina, Sicily. He was laid to rest in the family grave at the cemetery in Varenholz, near Rinteln.
