= Carl Ladendorff =

German politician (1869–1947)

- Ladendorff in 1931

Deputy of the Landtag of Prussia
- In office 10 March 1921 – 23 May 1932

Personal details
- Born: 6 February 1869 Borrentin, Kingdom of Prussia, German Empire
- Died: 1947 (aged 77–78)
- Party: Economic Party, 1921–1933
- Occupation: Politician; Landowner; Banker

Carl Ladendorff (6 February 1869 – 1947) was a prominent politician, banker, and businessman of the Economic Party (WP) who led the party in Prussian Landtag during most of the Weimar Republic. He played a critical role in pushing the party towards the political right, promoting close relationships with the national-conservative German National People's Party (DNVP) and later the national-socialist Nazi (NSDAP) party. His disputes with party leader Hermann Drewitz and personal allegations of corruption stemming from the collapse of his banking conglomerate would play a key role in the party's electoral collapse in the July 1932 federal election, bolstering the rising Nazi party.

== Biography ==
Ladendorff was born on the 6 February 1869, in the municipality of Borrentin, at that time apart of the Pomeranian Province of Prussia. He would serve in a mix of careers outside of his political career, serving as the chairman of the supervisory board for the Berliner Bank für Handel und Grundbesitz and on the supervisory board of the Mitteldeutschen Boden-Kredit-Anstatlt AG.

Berliner Bank für Handel und Grundbesitz in November 1931.

=== Rise ===
In 1920, the Economic Party was formed by Hermann Drewitz and Johann Victor Bredt, among others. Ladendorff, alongside Georg Baumert, attempted to convince Bredt to lead the party in the upcoming Prussian state elections, though Bredt declined. Despite Bredt declining to lead the party, both men entered into the Prussian Landtag following the election; (Note: On 10 March 1921) they served as two of the four deputies of the WP. As of 1921, the WP's support base was narrow and small. However, Bredt, now serving as Reichstag leader in Prussia — despite his earlier reluctance to lead the WP in Prussia — was committed to expanding the party to include the entire old middlestrand (old middle class), overcoming interconfessional and even interfaith differences. In this, Ladendorff played a crucial role in securing support from landowners, a job in which Bredt stated Ladendorff did "first-class work." His opposition towards financial controls on the housing sector helped the party gain crucial support in the 1924 elections. Outside of his political career, Ladendorff further served as president of the Prussian and Berlin branches of the Association of Urban Landords. He supported the free market in the housing sector, arguing "Never and nowhere will the people live better, more comfortably, more carefree and more cheaply than in the tenement houses produced by the free economy."

In 1924, Ladendorff became the leader of the WP in Prussia, Germany's most important state. Ladendorff was a strong leader of the party; historian Dietrich Orlow characterized him as an "effective demagogue." Despite Ladendorff's effectiveness, the WP never became a significant political force in Prussia. Unlike in most of the Weimar Republic, Prussia lacked the fragmentation of the bourgeois electorate into special interest parties— political power was instead concentrated in a few significant parties. Regardless, the Economic Party became the only special interest party represented in the Prussian Landtag.

Ladendorff's leadership of the Economic Party in Prussia was characterized by an anti-republican, nationalist stance. The party became closely associated with the national-conservative German National People's Party (DNVP), a party strongly opposed to the Weimar Republic. Throughout his leadership of the Prussian WP, Ladendorff repeatedly attempted to push the party to the right, often unequivocally. Ladendorff severely criticized the Social Democratic Party of Germany (SPD) and the Catholic German Centre Party, who constituted the pro-republic Weimar Coalition that led the Prussian government. Ladendorff characterized the coalition as the "dictatorship of Social Democracy assisted by the Center party." This criticism was based on Ladendorff's personal anti-socialism and anti-Catholicism, though the party would later vote in favour of the Prussian Concordat with the Catholic Church. Until the Prussian concordat, the party would vote against every government legislation between 1921–1929. Ladendorff's polemic attacks frustrated attempts for the WP to enter into cabinet, both in Prussia and nationally. During cabinet negotiations to form the second Müller cabinet in 1928, the Prussian wing of the liberal German People's Party (DVP) demanded, as a precondition to entering into cabinet, the participation of the WP in the SPD-led cabinet; the Prussian WP's hardline stance resulted in the DVP dropping the precondition, with the WP failing to enter into cabinet.

Following the 1930 federal election, Ladendorff strived for the stabilization of the Weimar Republic, despite his earlier opposition to the republican system. Ladendorff's evolving view was matched by the WP, with Bredt serving as the federal Minister of Justice in the first Brüning cabinet. Ladendorff was alarmed at increasing social disintegration caused by the Great Depression, which had begun the year prior, and the DNVP's shift to new chairman Alfred Hugenburg's Katastrophenpolitik (lit. catastrophe politics) and ultranationalism. Regarding the DNVP as the now-principal threat to stability, Ladendorff broke with the DNVP, denouncing the party for its political shift. Nevertheless, Ladendorff and the Prussian WP maintained a positive relationship with the Prussian National Socialists (NSDAP), who they regarded as advocates of ordinary Germans, especially in contrast to the perceived favoritism given to industrial and agricultural interests within Hugenburg's DNVP. This was further reinforced by Ladendorff's amicable relationship to Wilhelm Kube, the leader of the NSDAP in Prussia. Kube was a noted supported of Gregor Strasser, the leader of the NSDAP's parliamentary "left" wing. Kube's anti-capitalist rhetoric convinced Ladendorff that the NSDAP was a supporter of small enterprises (the traditional support base of the WP) — unlike the DNVP. Ladendorff would later represent the WP at the far-right extremist Harzburg Front dedicated to the overthrow of Germany's republican system.

=== Fall ===
However, in late 1930, the WP began to decline. A series of disputes divided the party, eventually tearing the party asunder. In the party's 1929 Berlin congress, Ladendorff attempted to create an independent parliamentary leadership for the WP, separate from the party's leadership. Ladendorff strived to reduce the power of the WP's chairman, Hermann Drewitz, who he thought vain and believed the party concentrated excessive powers in. However, his attempt to reduce Drewitz's powers failed. Thereafter Ladendorff attempted to oust Drewitz as chair, a view which was reflected by deputy chair Otto Colosser. Colosser accused Drewitz of embezzlement, even launching a formal legal complaint against him. This dispute divided the party, eventually leading to Colosser's resignation from the WP and Drewitz's re-election as chairman. However, a third leadership challenge soon engulfed the WP, with former Saxon finance minister Hugo Weber — a supporter of Ladendorff and Colosser's attempts to remove Drewitz — leading the influential Saxon branch of the WP in seceding from the federal party. Weber and the Saxons were soon joined by Max Robert Gerstenhauer's Thuringian branch, who also announced their succession from the federal party. Following negotiations, Drewitz was able to reign in the Saxons, with Weber and his supporters rejoining the party; Drewitz had defeated every leadership challenge against him. Nevertheless, Drewitz would resign from the chairmanship in August of 1931, being replaced with Bredt.

Concurrently, the party faced a succession of crises. In 1929, the Prussian SPD accused Ladendorff of financial irregularities regarding the Dessauer Realkreditbank. Before entering into politics, Ladendorff had served as a Reichsbank manager. Ladendorff was able to quickly resolve the allegations, but only after media attention to the accusation. In late 1931 two deputies of the Prussian WP left the party and formed a new group — the radical middlestrand. In the same period, the Deutsche Mittelstandsbank collapsed due to the ongoing Great Depression, taking with it the party's finances. With the rise of the NSDAP, the WP in Prussia was left decrepit, and in the 1932 Prussian state election the party failed to secure a single seat. The party's presence in the Prussian Landtag was over.

Ladendorff died in 1947.
