= Otto Colosser =

German politician (1878–1948)

Deputy Chairman of the Economic Party
- In office 1924 – January 1931

Member of the Reichstag
- In office 13 June 1928 – 4 June 1932

Member of the Landtag of Prussia
- In office 1927 – 21 June 1928

Stadtverordneter (Note: City councillor) of the Berlin City Assembly
- In office 1925–1927

Personal details
- Born: 8 November 1878 Schöneberg, Kingdom of Prussia, German Empire
- Died: 1948 (aged 69–70)
- Party: Economic Party, 1920–1931; German State Party, 1931–1932
- Occupation: Politician; Architect

Military service
- Allegiance: German Empire
- Years of service: 1914–1919

Otto Colosser (8 November 1878 – 1948) was a prominent politician and architect of the Economic Party who served as deputy party chairman during the Weimar Republic. Colosser occupied several offices; as Reichstag deputy (1928–32) and as Prussian Landtag deputy (1927–28). (Note: Replacing a deceased member) He also served as the party's chief propagandist from 1924 to 1930.

== Early life ==
Otto Colosser was born on 8 November 1878 in the gemeinde (Note: A gemeinde was the basic unit of local governance, equivalent to "municipality" in English.) of Schöneberg, to an evangelical Protestant family. Schöneberg was a newly created municipality; earlier that year, the gemeinden of Alt-Schöneberg and Neu-Schöneberg merged. He graduated from the Charlottenburger oberrealschule, (Note: A secondary school dedicated to prepare students for tertiary education at a technical university.) before attending Charlottenburger's technical university, where he studied structural engineering. After graduating, he became employed as an architect in line with his degree. In 1910, Colosser changed professions, after taking control of his father's business.

In 1914, the First World War began, once again changing Colosser's profession. He initially joined the Landsturm, assisting with military construction. During his service, he became a site manager in Building Department III, due to his architectural experience. In 1916, he began directing the construction of large-scale ammunition factories. However, in 1919, the First World War ended with a German defeat, and with it Colosser's employment.

When the Economic Party was created in 1920 by Hermann Drewitz and Johann Viktor Bredt, among others, Colosser would join the party the same year it was created. He would rise to become deputy party chairman by 1924, remaining in this position until his resignation from the party in 1931; he would further serve the party as chief propagandist from 1924 to 1930. As a member of the Economic Party, he would serve in a series of representative positions: as Stadtverordneter (Note: City councillor) of the Berlin City Council from 1925 to 1927, member of the Landtag of Prussia from 1927 until the Prussian election the following year, and as a national Reichstag deputy from 1928 to 1932. He participated in numerous professional associations within the construction sector, notably serving on the executive board of the German Craftsmen's Association.

== The Colosser affair ==
In November 1930, following Carl Ladendorff's attempts to reduce party chairman Hermann Drewitz's control of the Economic Party, Colosser first accused — and in the following month — launched charges against Drewitz for embezzlement. In January of the next year, Drewitz was retained as party leader by the party's leadership, with investigations by a party court pending. In March, Drewitz was exonerated of the embezzlement allegations, soon followed by decisively winning re-election as party leader. Concurrently, the party leadership began expulsion procedures against Colosser, leading to his resignation from the Economic Party. He would join the German State Party, a centrist liberal party.

According to Social Democratic Party of Germany-affiliated newspaper Vorwärts, on 25 January 1931, Colosser filed a formal legal complaint against Drewitz, alongside the internal party dispute. He accused Drewitz of similar allegations to those he submitted to the Economic Party's leadership: embezzlement, fraud, and breach of trust. However, on 25 August, the regional Generalstaatsanwalt (Note: Trans. to roughly "general public prosecuter") discontinued the legal proceedings; Colosser's legal challenges against Drewitz ended.
