= 1924 Lübeck state election =

German state election

- 10 February 1924
- All 80 seats in the Bürgerschaft of Lübeck; 41 seats needed for a majority
- Turnout: 87.3% (▲8.0pp)
Party	Vote %	Seats	+/–
Social Democratic Party	34.4%	28	−11
Economic Party	26.5%	21	New
Communist Party of Germany	12.1%	10	+4
Landowners	10.7%	8	+2
German Democratic Party	8.9%	7	−18
Völkische	7.4%	6	New
This lists parties that won seats. See the complete results below.

The 1924 Lübeck state election was held on 10 February 1924 to elect the 80 members of the Bürgerschaft, the state parliament of the Free and Hanseatic City of Lübeck.

== Results ==
The Social Democratic Party (SPD) remained the largest party but suffered major losses, dropping to 28 seats and continuing to lose ground compared to its 1919 and 1921 results. Meanwhile, the liberal German Democratic Party (DDP) collapsed, losing over half its seats.

A new bourgeois force, the Wirtschaftsgemeinschaft (linked to the Reich Party of the German Middle Class), emerged strongly with 21 seats. The Communist Party (KPD) gained ground on the left. The far-right nationalist Völkische Party entered state parliament for the first time.

Party	Votes	%	Seats	+/–
Social Democratic Party of Germany	25,254	34.37	28	–11
Wirtschaftsgemeinschaft (Economic Party)	19,506	26.54	21	New
Communist Party of Germany	8,896	12.11	10	+4
Landowners	7,871	10.71	8	+2
German Democratic Party	6,556	8.92	7	–18
Völkische	5,402	7.35	6	New
Total	73,485	100.00	80	0
Valid votes	73,485	99.66		
Invalid/blank votes	250	0.34		
Total votes	73,735	100.00		
Registered voters/turnout	84,432	87.33		
Source: Elections in the Weimar Republic, Elections in Germany
