= East Prussian Provinzialtag elections in the Weimar Republic =

Election results

These are the summary results by party of the elections to the Provinzialtag ("Provincial Assembly") of East Prussia during the Weimar Republic (1918–1933).

== 1921 ==
Party Abbreviation	%	seats
DNVP	27,1 %	23
SPD	23,5%	20
DVP	15,3 %	13
Zentrum	9,4 %	8
KPD	7,2 %	6
USPD	7,1 %	6
DDP	7,0 %	6
Polen	1,3%	1
WP	1,2 %	1
Landliste	1,1 %	1

== 1925 ==
Party Abbreviation	%	seats
DNVP/DVP	45,6%	40
SPD	24,8 %	22
Zentrum	6,9 %	6
KPD	6,9%	6
WP	4,2 %	4
DVFP	4,2 %	4
DDP	3,6 %	3
Aufwertungspartei	2,4%	2

== 1929 ==
Party Abbreviation	%	seats
DNVP	31,2 %	27
SPD	26,0 %	23
DVP	8,7%	8
KPD	8,6%	8
Zentrum	8,1 %	7
NSDAP	4,3 %	4
WP	4,0%	4
CSVD	3,0 %	3
DDP	2,8%	3

== 1933 ==
Party Abbreviation	%	seats
NSDAP	58,2%	51
SPD	13,6 %	12
DNVP	12,7 %	11
Zentrum	7,0 %	7
KPD	6,0 %	6

== Sources ==
- Wahlen-in-Deutschland: Weimarer Republik 1918-1933 - Preußische Provinziallandtage - Provinz Ostpreußen (in German)
