= Conservative People's Party (Germany) =

Conservative People's Party Konservative Volkspartei
- Abbreviation: KVP
- Chairman: Gottfried Reinhold Treviranus (28 January 1930 - 15 December 1930); Paul Lejeune-Jung 15 December 1930 - 11 June 1932; Heinz Dähnhardt (11 June 1932 - 31 March 1933)
- Founded: 28 January 1930
- Dissolved: 31 March 1933
- Preceded by: People's Conservative Association; German National People's Party (DNVP) (splinter factions)
- Succeeded by: None
- Newspaper: Volkskonservative Stimmen (People's Conservative Voices).
- Membership: 10,000
- Ideology: Conservatism (German); Christian democracy Economic liberalism German nationalism Right-wing populism
- Political position: Right-wing
- Political alliance: Centre Party (Heinrich Brüning)

The Conservative People's Party (German: Konservative Volkspartei, KVP) was a short-lived conservative and Christian democratic political party of the moderate right in the last years of the Weimar Republic. It broke away from the German National People's Party (DNVP) in July 1930 as a result of the DNVP's increasing shift to the right under the leadership of Alfred Hugenberg. It remained a numerically insignificant minor party but was represented in the governments of Heinrich Brüning (1930–1932). The KVP folded on 31 March 1933 after it ran out of funds.

== Name ==
The term Volkskonservativ (popular conservative) was probably first used by journalist Hermann Ullmann in 1926. He had in mind conservatives of both the Catholic and Protestant faiths whose fundamental attitude was Christian, social and anti-nationalist. In the two years that followed, Volkskonservativ became a collective term for those in the DNVP who opposed the party's 1928 shift to the right and wanted to continue the earlier cooperation with the Catholic Centre Party. The term is also found in a 1927 essay by DNVP politician Walther Lambach, "Monarchism", which stated that the DNVP should not be one-sidedly monarchist but a "popular conservative party of self-help".

Among older DNVP members such as Kuno Graf von Westarp and in the conservative monarchist newspaper Kreuzzeitung, the name was controversial. The Kreuzzeitung said that the original name Volkskonservative Vereinigung (People's Conservative Association) weakened the clear term "conservative", although Hermann Ullmann defended the new name because he thought that "conservative" should never again be understood as "reactionary".

== History ==
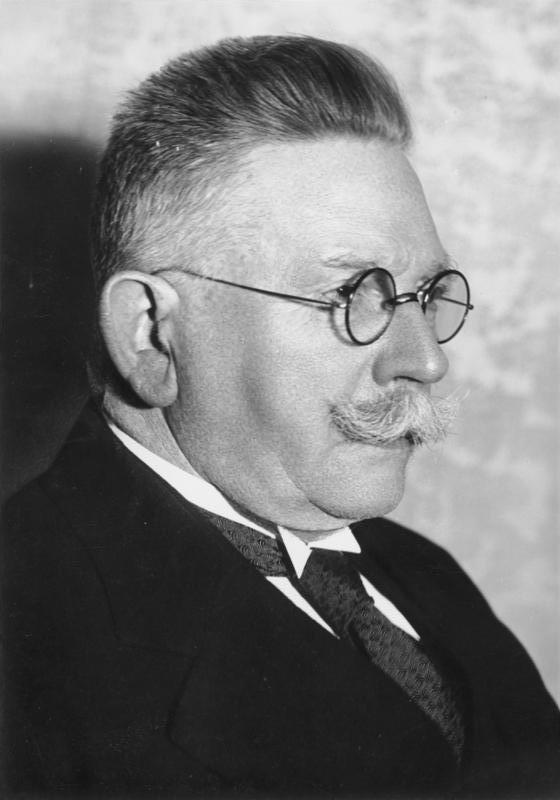
Alfred Hugenberg

=== Formation ===
The new party grew out of criticism in parts of the DNVP of the policies of the publisher Alfred Hugenberg, who had ousted Kuno von Westarp from the post of party chairman in 1928. Hugenberg's active support for the 1929 referendum against the Young Plan that finalized a schedule for German reparations payments to the victors of World War I, and the DNVP's cooperation during the referendum drive with the Nazi Party (NSDAP), met with party members' particular disapproval. When the bill resulting from the referendum, the "Law against the Enslavement of the German People", was put to a vote in the Reichstag, about twenty out of 73 DNVP deputies refused to follow Hugenberg. He responded with party expulsion proceedings. Gottfried Treviranus and other deputies resigned from the party and von Westarp from the chairmanship of the parliamentary group. Some of the dissidents joined the Christian Social People's Service and others the Christian-National Peasants' and Farmers' Party.

A group around Treviranus and Walther Lambach formed the People's Conservative Association at a meeting in the Prussian House of Lords on 28 January 1930. Initially the association was not to be a party, only a means to gather like-minded people together in order to bring the DNVP back to its former course. The provisional People's Conservative Association became a kind of supra-regional political club. In the House of Lords, Treviranus said that the DNVP had to decide between a conservative and a National Socialist course and that the People's Conservative Association was ready to merge into a large right-of-center party. Because of this it had no party program.

A few months later, there were once again splits in the DNVP due to its stance with regard to the government of Chancellor Heinrich Brüning of the Centre Party. A group around von Westarp left the party, came together with the People's Conservative Association and formed the Conservative People's Party.

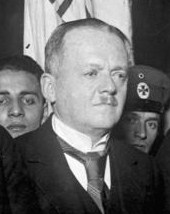
Kuno von Westarp

=== Participation in government ===
The party supported Brüning's center-right policy. From March 1930 to May 1932 Gottfried Treviranus served in the government in various ministerial positions, including Minister for the Occupied Territories and Minister of Transport. His presence in the cabinet gave the party a weight beyond its tiny representation in parliament, which was just four seats out of 577 after the September 1930 election. With Brüning's dismissal in May 1932, Treviranus' tenure as minister also ended, and with it the KVP's participation in political power. The KVP did not run in the July 1932 election, the first in which the Nazi Party won the largest number of seats.

=== Outside of parliament ===
In the period of the presidential cabinets that followed Brüning, the KVP was no longer represented in parliament. They reacted to the government of Franz von Papen with wait-and-see skepticism. They expected a prolonged era of reaction and were critical of the curtailment of unemployment insurance and of Papen's foreign policy, but they initially welcomed the 1932 Prussian coup d'état, when Reich President Paul von Hindenburg replaced the legal government of the Free State of Prussia by von Papen as Reich Commissioner.

Initially the party distanced itself from Reich Chancellor Kurt von Schleicher – the last Chancellor before Adolf Hitler – but later, out of necessity, took a more positive stance towards his government. Even if they formed no strong ties with him, the party's attitude became more favorable when he returned to Brüning's policies. Heinz Dähnhardt, one of the original founders of the KVP, said that Schleicher was the only alternative to Hitler. In doing so, he echoed the opinion of the influential German National Association of Commercial Employees, which had previously favored a coalition between the National Socialists and the Centre Party.

The KVP viewed Adolf Hitler and his program with uncertainty. It was not clear to them what a term like "Third Reich" was supposed to mean. Even on 18 February 1933, when Hitler was already chancellor, they were still saying that a fascist experiment could not last long and that the only possible form of government for Germany in the future would be an authoritarian state. The crisis of the KVP was clearly reflected in the contradictory recommendations that were issued for the Reichstag elections on March 5. Some were for the Combat Front Black-White-Red made up of the DNVP and its paramilitary wing the Stahlhelm, and some for the Christian Social People's Service and indirectly also for the National Socialists.

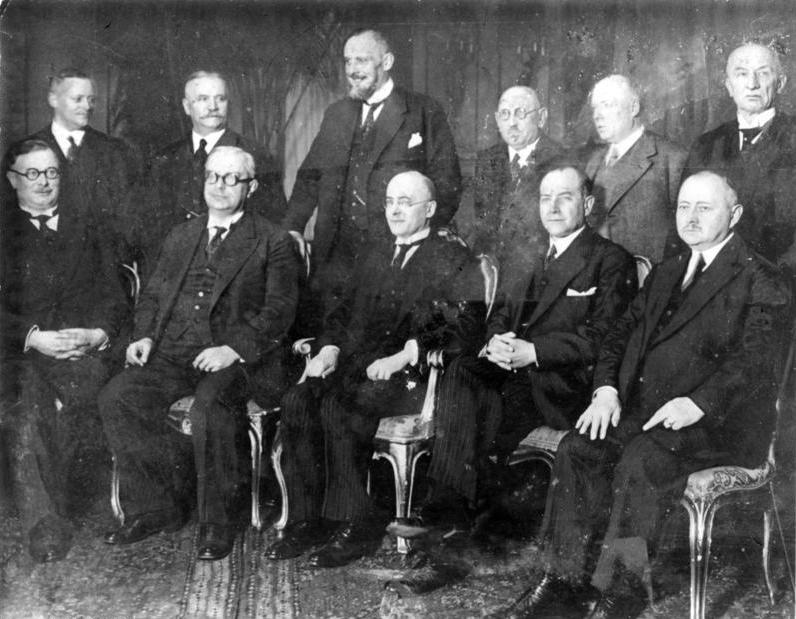
Brüning cabinet. Gottfried Treviranus, back row, far left.

On 31 March 1933, the KVP folded due to lack of funds, and Heinz Dähnhardt destroyed the party's archives on 1 May 1933. Like all other remaining parties, the KVP was banned by law on 14 July 1933. Treviranus fled abroad in mid-1934, narrowly escaping the Night of the Long Knives.

== Program ==
The Conservative People's Party called for an end to the "system of disorderly mass rule, by means of a state structured in accordance with the historical development and natural segmentation of the people". What was meant by this was a constitution oriented around occupational class.

In its 1930 election appeal, the KVP advocated a nationalist but moderate foreign policy, calling for a revision of "tribute burdens" (First World War reparations), a referendum for the three cantons known as Eupen-Malmedy that had been ceded to Belgium at the end of the war, the return to Germany of the Saar basin, also lost in the war, and a new border in the East. In domestic policy, the party wanted an unspecified reform of functions at the federal and state level, a strengthening of local self-government, and secure positions for public servants. Instead of "party and program elections", "elections of individuals" were to be introduced.

Economically, the KVP wanted to see a "viable market" and independent trade that was to be protected from competition and nationalization. Occupational-class structures were to be expanded. Culture promoted by the state had to be "consistent with the principles of the Christian doctrines of salvation and morality".

== Structure ==
The People's Conservative Association and then the People's Conservative Party had a national office in Berlin. According to its statutes of 17 December 1930, the KVP had a 25-member Reich Executive Committee that was elected for a two-year term. It in turn elected the eleven-member Reich Executive Board which included the party chairman and the editor of the party newspaper Volkskonservative Stimmen (People's Conservative Voices). A member of the executive committee had responsibility for day-to-day management. The first chairman was Treviranus, then from December 15 Paul Lejeune-Jung. After he resigned in 1932, Heinz Dähnhardt took over management. The KVP had little presence in the German states.

The People's Conservative Association, which was temporarily revived alongside the KVP, adopted a charter in 1931 according to which it strove for "the political unification of all forces" that were "determined to fight for a free, vigorously led German state in the spirit of the 'Conservative Manifesto' of 15 February 1931". Any German could become a member. The general meeting, the "Conservative Reich Convention", elected a "Leadership Ring" for two years, which chose a speaker. Reichstag and Landtag (state parliament) deputies were not allowed to be members, but instead belonged to a "Parliamentary Ring".

Beginning in 1930, the association published a series of People's Conservative pamphlets and, for its employees, the People's Conservative Leadership Letters. In addition, the People's Conservatives had contacts with the newspapers Tägliche Rundschau and the Deutsche Allgemeine Zeitung.

== Significance ==
The Conservative People's Party saw itself as the core of a movement around which the bourgeoisie could crystallize. That, however, did not happen, and the organization remained a party without a mass following or a party apparatus worth mentioning. In particular, unlike the DNVP, it lacked the support of the agrarian interest groups in the conservative strongholds of eastern Prussia. In 1930, it had just 10,000 members. It received considerable financial support from industry, which rejected Hugenberg's anti-governmental policies.

In elections, the party remained largely unsuccessful. In the Reichstag elections of 1930, it won four seats through a combined list with the Landvolkpartei (Farmers' Party). But even in that election, it gained only about 300,000 votes, or 0.8% of the votes cast. It achieved its only mandate at the state level in 1930, in the parliamentary elections in Bremen. The attempt to unite the bourgeois parties, including the KVP, failed in 1932, as the result of which the KVP did not run in the 1932 Reichstag elections. That marked the end of its meaningful political activity.
