= Ludomy =

- Village
- Location within Poland
- Coordinates: 52°46′N 16°49′E
- Country: Poland
- Voivodeship: Greater Poland
- County: Oborniki
- Gmina: Ryczywół
- Population: 500

Ludomy [luˈdɔmɨ] is a village in the administrative district of Gmina Ryczywół, within Oborniki County, Greater Poland Voivodeship, in west-central Poland.

== Notable residents ==
- Kuno von Westarp (1864–1945), German politician
