= 1921 Lübeck state election =

German state election

- 13 November 1921
- All 80 seats in the Bürgerschaft of Lübeck; 41 seats needed for a majority
- Turnout: 79.3% (▼2.1pp)
Party	Vote %	Seats	+/–
Social Democratic Party	48.7%	39	−3
German Democratic Party	31.1%	25	−4
New Landowners Association	8.0%	6	New
Communist Party of Germany	6.8%	6	New
Citizens' Federation	5.5%	4	New
This lists parties that won seats. See the complete results below.

The 1921 Lübeck state election was held on 13 November 1921 to elect the 80 members of the Bürgerschaft, the state parliament of the Free and Hanseatic City of Lübeck.

The Social Democratic Party (SPD) had won a majority in the 1919 election and played a dominant role in drafting the city's constitution, which was adopted in May 1920.

While the SPD remained the largest party and retained a strong plurality, it lost its absolute majority. The Communist Party of Germany (KPD) entered the state parliament for the first time. The Citizens' Federation was associated with the liberal German Democratic Party (DPP). The New Landowners Association replaced the German National People's Party (DNVP) in the Lübeck state parliament.

The state parliament coexisted with Johann Martin Andreas Neumann, a nonpartisan nationalist who became mayor of Lübeck in January 1921. Neumann had been a member of the DDP.

== Results ==
Party	Votes	%	Seats	+/–
Social Democratic Party of Germany	31,073	48.67	39	▼3
Bürgerliche Parteiliste (German Democratic Party)	19,834	31.06	25	▼4
New Landowners Association	5,083	7.96	6	New
Communist Party of Germany	4,330	6.78	6	New
Citizens' Federation	3,527	5.52	4	New
Total	63,847	100.00	80	0
Valid votes	63,847	99.69		
Invalid/blank votes	199	0.31		
Total votes	64,046	100.00		
Registered voters/turnout	80,731	79.33		
Source: Elections in the Weimar Republic, Elections in Germany
