= Kuno von Westarp =

German politician (1864–1945)

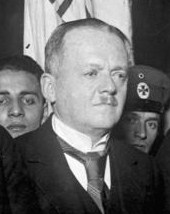
- Westarp in 1924

Chairman of the German National People's Party
- In office 24 March 1926 – 20 October 1928
- Preceded by: Johann Friedrich Winckler
- Succeeded by: Alfred Hugenberg

Member of the Reichstag
- In office 24 June 1920 – 4 June 1932
- Constituency: Potsdam II

Personal details
- Born: 12 August 1864 Ludom, Province of Posen; Kingdom of Prussia
- Died: 30 July 1945 (aged 80) Berlin, Germany
- Party: BDL (1890s); DkP (1900s–1918); DNVP (1918–1930); KVP (1930–1933)
- Occupation: Jurist

Count Kuno Friedrich Viktor von Westarp (12 August 1864 – 30 July 1945) was a German Junker politician, agrarian advocate, and jurist. A leading figure of German conservatism during the final years of the German Empire, and in the Weimar Republic, he served as the chairman of the German National People's Party from 1926 to 1928. His failure to transform the party into a conservative sammelpartei (transl. Catch-all party) marked the definitive shift of German conservatism into Völkisch nationalism and collaboration with the Nazi Party.

== Life and career ==
Westarp was born in Ludom (present-day Ludomy, Poland) in the Prussian Province of Posen, the son of a senior forestry official. He attended the Gymnasium secondary school in Potsdam and studied jurisprudence at the universities of Tübingen, Breslau, Leipzig, and Berlin, passed the Staatsexamen in 1886 and did his military service in Breslau and Potsdam, where he was elevated to a reserve officer of the 1st Foot Guard regiment.

In 1887 he began his career in civil service at the administrative district (Landkreis) office in Freienwalde, Brandenburg whose head was Theobald von Bethmann Hollweg, the later Chancellor of Germany. After his second Staatsexamen in 1891 Westarp continued his career as an assessor in Gostyn and Bomst in Posen, and in Stettin. He joined the service of the Prussian State Ministry in 1902 and became Chief of Police in the Schöneberg and Wilmersdorf suburbs of Berlin, before in 1908 he was appointed a senior judge at the Prussian administrative court.

Westarp had joined the German Agrarian League in the 1890s, his political advancement began in 1908 as a member of the German Reichstag parliament as a member of the German Conservative Party, from 1913 to 1918 as head of the parliamentary group. During World War I, he agitated against the 1917 Reichstag Peace Resolution, advocated the use of unrestricted submarine warfare and rejected the reform of the Prussian three-class franchise initiated by Chancellor Bethmann Hollweg.

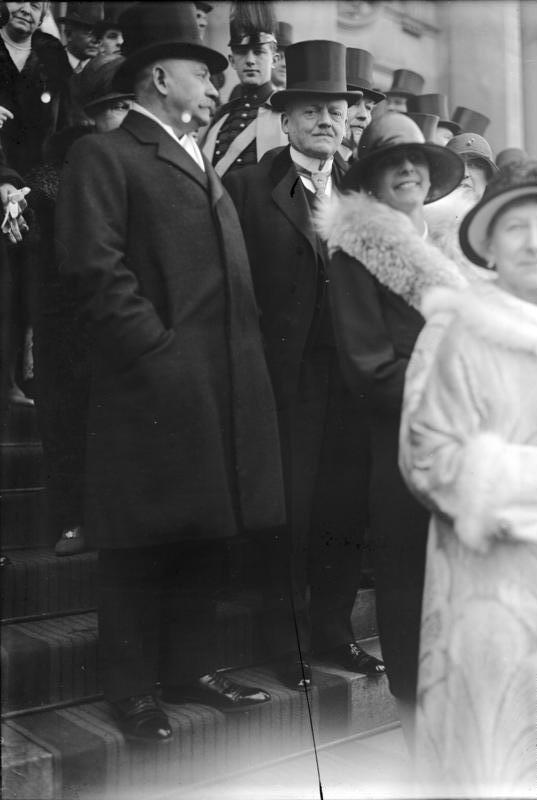
Westarp (centre) in July 1928

After the German Revolution of 1918–19, Westarp became one of the founding members of the German National People's Party (DNVP). From 1919 he worked as an editor of the conservative Kreuzzeitung newspaper whose shareholder he became in 1925. While his career in civil service ended with his retirement in 1920, he was again elected into the Reichstag parliament of the Weimar Republic. Initially an exponent of the far-right, anti-democratic forces within his party, he was involved in the preparations of the failed Kapp Putsch, however, he adopted more centrist positions in the mid-1920s, rising to become head of the DNVP parliamentary group and party chairman in 1926.

In 1925 the DNVP had temporarily abandoned its anti-republican attitude by joining the German cabinet in a liberal-conservative coalition government under Chancellor Hans Luther. However, in the 1928 federal election, the party suffered a disastrous defeat and had to accept the formation of Social Democratic government under Chancellor Hermann Müller. Westarp resigned as chairman; when in 1930 his support for the government of Heinrich Brüning did not meet with the approval of his party, and because of the anti-republican tendencies of his successor Alfred Hugenberg which became manifest during the 1929 referendum, he finally left the DNVP in 1930. In the same year he and Gottfried Treviranus were among the founders of the moderate Conservative People's Party (KVP), with which he sat in the Reichstag until 1932.

Westarp did not stand for another seat in the 1932 federal election whose outcome was a triumph of the rising Nazi Party. Upon the 1933 Machtergreifung he retired into private life. Suspected by the Nazi authorities to be involved in the 20 July plot, preliminary investigations against him furnished no proof. At the end of World War II, he was temporarily arrested by Soviet occupation forces in Berlin but soon released and died shortly afterwards.

== Literature ==
- Graf von Westarp, Kuno; Mayer, Karl J.; Weber, Reinhold (2001). Freiherr Hiller von Gaertringen, Friedrich (ed.). Konservative Politik im Übergang vom Kaiserreich zur Weimarer Republik. Quellen zur Geschichte des Parlamentarismus und der politischen Parteien (in German). Vol. 10. Düsseldorf: Droste. ISBN 3-7700-5239-0.
