= 1932 Prussian state election =

State election in Germany

- 24 April 1932

All 423 seats in the Landtag of Prussia 212 seats needed for a majority
- Turnout: 82.1% (▲5.7pp)
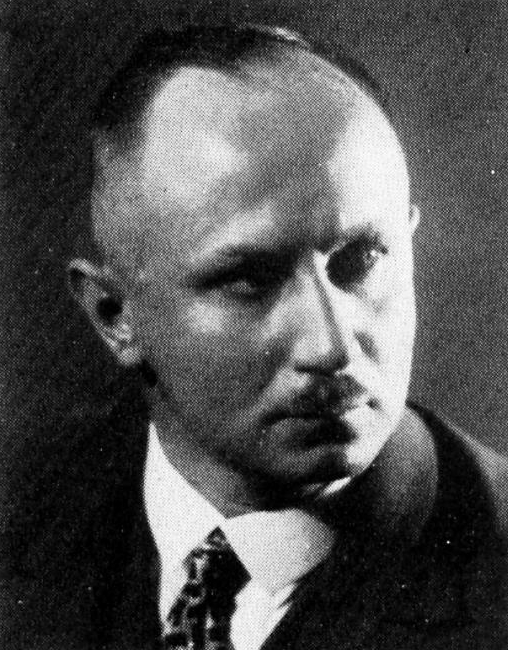

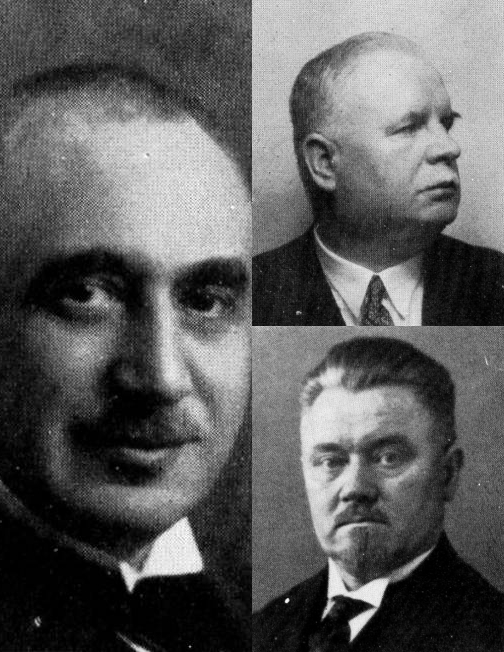

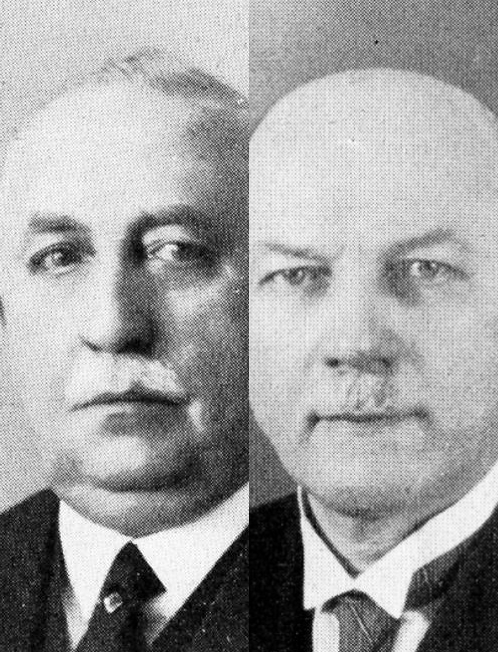

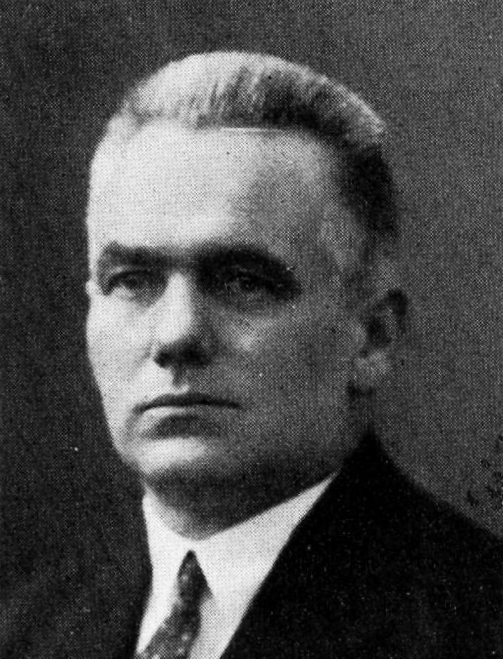

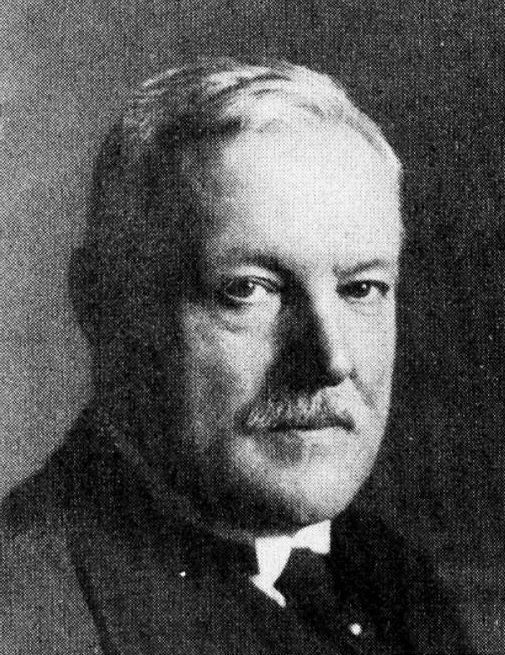

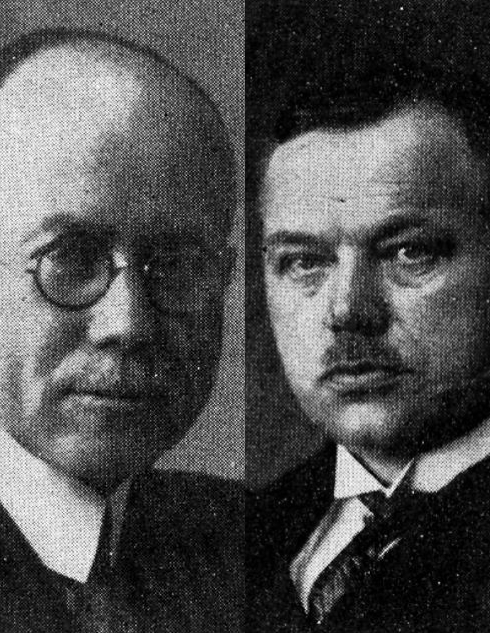
	First party	Second party	Third party
Leader	Wilhelm Kube	Ernst Heilmann; Robert Leinert; Wilhelm Winzer	Christian Steger; Constantin Zawadzki
Party	NSDAP	SPD	Centre
Last election	1.8%, 6 seats	29.0%, 137 seats	14.5%, 68 seats
Seats won	162	94	67
Seat change	▲156	▼43	▼4
Popular vote	8,091,072	4,675,173	3,371,932
Percentage	36.7%	21.2%	15.3%
Swing	▲34.6 pp	▼7.8 pp	▲0.1 pp
	Fourth party	Fifth party	Sixth party
Leader	Wilhelm Pieck	Friedrich von Winterfeld	Wilhelm Schwarzhaupt; Ernst Stendel
Party	KPD	DNVP	DVP
Last election	11.9%, 56 seats	17.4%, 82 seats	8.5%, 40 seats
Seats won	57	31	7
Seat change	▲1	▼51	▼35
Popular vote	2,845,306	1,540,716	374,509
Percentage	12.9%	7.0%	1.7%
Swing	▲1.0 pp	▼10.4 pp	▼8.1 pp
- Results by electoral constituency
Minister-President before election
Third Braun cabinet
SPD–Z–DDP
Elected Minister-President
Third Braun cabinet
Caretaker until 20 July 1932

State elections were held in the Free State of Prussia on 24 April 1932 to elect all 423 members of the Landtag of Prussia. They were the last free election in Prussia, as the next election in 1933 took place under the Nazi regime, and Prussia was then abolished after World War II.

The election saw the Nazi Party become the largest party in Prussia, winning 36% of the vote. The coalition of the Social Democratic Party, Centre Party, and German Democratic Party (now the German State Party), which had governed Prussia since 1919, lost its majority. The SPD, DNVP, and DVP all suffered huge losses. The Economic Party and the CNBLP were eliminated from the Landtag, while the DVP and DStP were left with only a handful each. The Centre Party stayed steady, and the Communist Party made minor gains.

The resulting Landtag was divided between the SPD–Zentrum–DStP coalition, the Nazi–DNVP bloc, and the Communist Party. Prussia used the constructive vote of no confidence, meaning a government could be removed from office only if there was a positive majority for a prospective successor. No parliamentary force held a majority, but since none were willing to cooperate with any of the others, the SPD-led coalition could not be removed. It continued in office as a minority government.

This situation ended with the Preußenschlag on 20 July 1932. Reich President Paul von Hindenburg, on the advice of Reich Chancellor Franz von Papen, issued an emergency decree under Article 48 of the Weimar Constitution dissolving the Prussian government and giving von Papen direct control over Prussia as Reichskommissar. Prussia remained under direct control of the federal government until April 1933 when, at the behest of Adolf Hitler under the Enabling Act of 1933, state elections were held. The Nazis failed to win a majority, but the subsequent ban of the Communist Party and arrest of opposition deputies allowed them to secure control of the Landtag regardless, and Hermann Göring became Minister-President. The federal structure of Germany was effectively dissolved under the Nazi regime, and the Prussian government existed only symbolically. After the conclusion of the Second World War, Prussia was dissolved by a declaration of the Allied Control Council on 25 February 1947.

== Results ==
Party	Votes	%	Swing	Seats	+/–
National Socialist German Workers Party (NSDAP); National Socialist German Workers Party (NSDAP); Farmers, Home and Landowners; Nationalist German Workers Party; Greater German List Schmalix	8,091,072; 8,007,384; 67,533; 11,605; 4,550	36.67; 36.29; 0.31; 0.05; 0.02	+34.60 +34.45 +0.15; New; New	162; 162; 0; 0; 0	+156 +156; 0 New; New
Social Democratic Party (SPD)	4,675,173	21.19	–7.81	94	–43
Prussian Centre Party (Zentrum)	3,371,932	15.28	+0.05	67	–4
Communist Party of Germany (KPD); Communist Party of Germany (KPD); Interest Group of Small Pensioners and Inflation Victims	2,845,306; 2,819,763; 25,543	12.89; 12.78; 0.12	+1.02 +0.91; New	57; 57; 0	+1 +1; New
German National People's Party (DNVP); German National People's Party (DNVP); Radical Middle Class; National Gathering Karl Andres	1,540,716; 1,524,230; 9,883; 6,603	6.98; 6.91; 0.04; 0.03	–10.41 –10.48; New; New	31; 31; 0; 0	–51 –51; New; New
German People's Party (DVP); German People's Party (DVP); People's Justice Party (VRP)	374,509; 330,745; 43,764	1.70; 1.50; 0.20	–8.05 –7.00 –1.05	7; 7; 0	–35 –33 –2
National Front of German Estates; Reich Party of the German Middle Class (WP); German Farmers (Christian-National Peasants' and Farmers' Party); National Front of German Estates, Young Rights; National Officials, Employees and Free Professionals	362,272; 191,021; 153,542; 13,861; 3,848	1.64; 0.87; 0.70; 0.06; 0.02	–4.28 –3.59 –0.77; New; New	0; 0; 0; 0; 0	–29 –21 –8; New; New
German State Party (DStP)	332,490	1.51	–2.95	2	–19
Christian Social People's Service (CSVD)	255,177	1.16	New	2	New
Socialist Workers' Party of Germany (SAPD)	80,392	0.36	New	0	New
German-Hanoverian Party (DHP)	63,731	0.29	–0.70	1	–3
National Minorities of Germany (NMD); Polish People's Party; Schleswig and Frisian Home; Prussian-Lithuanian People's Party	59,943; 57,285; 2,298; 360	0.27; 0.26; 0.01; 0.00	–0.13 –0.12; 0.00; 0.00	0; 0; 0; 0	0; 0; 0; 0
National Opposition of United Reichsbank Creditors and Mark Victims; National Opposition of United Reichsbank Creditors and Mark Victims; People's Justice and Economic Party of the Dispossessed Middle Class; German Combat Party Against Inflation and False Monetary Policy; Activist Emergency Community of Mortgagees, etc.	6,896; 5,197; 1,151; 312; 236	0.03; 0.02; 0.01; 0.00; 0.00	New; New; New; New; New	0; 0; 0; 0; 0	New; New; New; New; New
Party of the Unemployed for Work and Bread	3,463	0.02	New	0	New
German Unity Party for Defence of the Economy, Idealistic Movement of Germany	1,341	0.01	New	0	New
German National Community (Völkisch Revolutionary Economic Movement)	1,014	0.00	New	0	New
Invalid/blank votes	127,560	0.57	–	–	–
Total	22,065,427	100	–	423	–27
Registered voters/turnout	27,031,562	82.10	+5.71	–	–
Gonschior.de

Popular Vote
NSDAP	36.67%
SPD	21.19%
Zentrum	15.28%
KPD	12.89%
DNVP	6.98%
DVP	1.70%
DStP	1.51%
CSVD	1.16%
DHP	0.29%
Other	2.33%

Landtag seats
NSDAP	38.30%
SPD	22.22%
Zentrum	15.84%
KPD	13.48%
DNVP	7.33%
DVP	1.65%
DStP	0.47%
CSVD	0.47%
DHP	0.24%

=== Results by constituency ===
Constituency	NSDAP	SPD	Z	KPD	DNVP	DVP	DStP	CSVD	DHP
1. East Prussia	45.6	22.2	7.5	9.1	9.5	1.5	1.2	1.8	–
2. Berlin	24.1	30.2	3.9	29.4	6.8	0.5	2.2	0.5	–
3. Potsdam II	32.0	27.6	3.9	16.9	10.4	1.4	4.2	0.5	–
4. Potsdam I	36.1	28.1	2.4	16.9	9.5	1.0	2.1	0.6	–
5. Frankfurt an der Oder	43.8	25.4	6.2	7.3	10.3	1.3	1.4	0.8	–
6. Pomerania	44.2	23.6	1.2	7.7	17.2	1.2	1.6	0.8	–
7. Breslau	41.2	25.0	15.3	6.8	6.2	–	1.0	1.5	–
8. Liegnitz	45.2	27.6	7.0	5.9	6.8	–	2.1	1.5	–
9. Oppeln	30.4	7.5	35.6	12.2	7.5	–	0.5	0.4	–
10. Magdeburg	39.8	33.8	2.0	9.3	8.3	1.9	1.8	0.4	–
11. Merseburg	41.8	18.9	1.4	21.9	7.9	2.0	1.6	0.5	–
12. Erfurt	39.7	18.2	13.1	14.7	6.9	2.0	1.8	0.5	–
13. Schleswig-Holstein	50.8	27.5	0.9	8.8	5.3	2.3	2.0	0.9	–
14. Weser-Ems	37.5	17.6	25.3	4.7	5.2	1.8	1.5	2.1	2.4
15. Hanover East	46.7	25.1	1.3	6.6	7.9	1.8	1.7	0.9	5.7
16. Hanover South	43.8	31.8	5.8	5.6	4.6	2.3	1.5	0.7	2.1
17. Westphalia North	25.3	15.5	35.3	10.5	5.0	1.9	0.5	2.0	–
18. Westphalia South	29.1	17.6	24.3	16.2	4.5	1.6	1.0	3.0	–
19. Hesse-Nassau	42.1	21.5	14.4	9.5	3.4	2.4	1.8	2.0	–
20. Köln-Aachen	22.5	11.0	42.1	13.6	3.3	2.5	1.2	0.5	–
21. Koblenz-Trier	28.2	6.3	47.4	6.7	4.1	1.5	0.5	–	–
22. Düsseldorf East	32.9	11.8	20.8	22.7	4.2	1.9	0.8	1.7	–
23. Düsseldorf West	29.6	9.5	34.1	14.8	5.6	1.6	0.5	1.0	–

== See also ==
- Elections in the Free State of Prussia
- Weimar Republic

== Sources ==
- Kienast, Ernst (1932). Handbuch für den Preußischen Landtag. Berlin: Schenk. pp. 397, 399, 400, 401, 402.
