= Economic Party (Germany) =

Political party in Weimar Germany

Reich Party of the German Middle Class Economic Party of the German Middle Class Reichspartei des deutschen Mittelstandes (Wirtschaftspartei)
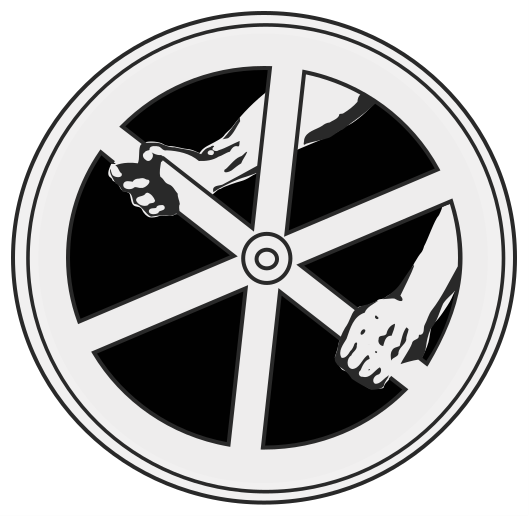
- Leader: Hermann Drewitz; Johann Viktor Bredt
- Founded: 1920
- Dissolved: 1933
- Preceded by: Economic Union of Greater Berlin
- Succeeded by: Union Deutscher Mittelstandsparteien (unofficial); Economic Reconstruction Union (unofficial); Wirtschaftliche Vereinigung des Mittelstandes (unofficial)
- Newspaper: Deutsche Mittelstands-Zeitung (Until 1932)
- Ideology: Conservatism (German); Anti-communism; Middle Class Interests; Corporatism; Factions: Classical liberalism Antisemitism; Völkisch nationalism
- Political position: Right-wing; Factions: Center-right to Far-right
- Colours: Black White
- Slogan: "Middle Class, Awake"

The Reich Party of the German Middle Class (German: Reichspartei des deutschen Mittelstandes), known from 1920 to 1925 as the Economic Party of the German Middle Classes (German: Wirtschaftspartei des deutschen Mittelstandes), was a conservative Weimar era political party in Germany. It was commonly known as the Economic Party (Note: Also commonly called the Business party, often abbreviated as the WP or WiP) (German: Wirtschaftspartei, WP).

Founded by baker Hermann Drewitz in 1920, the Economic Party gained support from prominent German conservatives, including jurist Johann Victor Bredt. It achieved success in regional elections before entering the national Reichstag in the May 1924 federal election. The party held its first national congress in Görlitz in 1926, embracing corporatism and reaffirming the party's direction as a middle-class special interest party. Despite the party's failure to join Müller's second cabinet, the WP briefly participated in Brüning's first cabinet with Bredt as justice minister. However, opposition to Brüning's cabinet from deputy chair Otto Colosser and Prussian leader Carl Ladendorff led to the party's withdrawal from the cabinet and a series of disputes with Drewitz. Drewitz resigned; Bredt replaced him as party chairman. Regardless, the internal strife, alongside the effects of the Great Depression and the rise of the Nazi Party, caused a decisive electoral defeat in the July 1932 federal election, leading to the party's eventual elimination from parliament. The Economic Party was forcibly dissolved by the Nazis in 1933.

== History ==
=== Background ===
Following the establishment of the Weimar Republic, the German National People's Party (DNVP), which emerged as the main conservative party, hoped to include Germany's established bourgeoisie as a natural part of its own support base. This however was not to be the case, as the party quickly became associated with general rural interests as well as those of big business. In addition to their political homelessness the middle class also had to content with the new Weimar Republic which intervened in and regulated the economy and especially the housing market far more, as well as persistently high inflation and rising interest rates on mortgages.

This situation led to a great deal of unease in the German middle class. On February 16, 1919, the Neue Zeit a local middle class newspaper in Charlottenburg called for the town middle class to form an election committee to which 38 responded. And in spring of 1920 the Charlottenburg Economic Union formed, followed by the Economic Association of Greater Berlin in April. The two combined to form the Economic Union for Town and Country, winning seats in the Berlin House of Representatives, as interest spread to Mecklenburg, Breslau, and Pomerania.

=== Founding ===
From September 11 to 13 of 1920 representatives of the aforementioned regions met to discuss their political futures and eventually decided to found a new political party, the Business Party of the German Middle Class. Led by baker Hermann Drewitz, architect and carpenter Franz Holzamer, and Mecklenburg representative Fritz Sonnichsen leaded to new party, all having been among the original 38 respondents. Allying with local landlords, they offered to serve as a political vehicle for those landlords in exchange for funding. The party reached out to several other parties offering their support in exchange for the incorporation of their ideas but this idea was rejected by every party they contacted. Looking for a figurehead for the party they eventually settled on Johann Viktor Bredt, who was middle class oriented, ideologically compatible, sufficiently well known, and had no concrete party affiliations. Despite some misgivings Bredt agreed to join the party.

In order to reflect the varied views of the different groups within the middle class, the WP called for a reduction in government economic involvement, a freer hand for business and lower taxes. It was particularly opposed to currency revaluation, which it considered an attack on the rights of property owners.

The WP would go on to become a party far less driven by ideology than most of other Weimar parties, instead it animated by the interests of the middle class. This led to the WP to become somewhat unprincipled being far more willing to support a wide range of policy in exchange for middle class concessions,. The party frequently engaged in the same sort of favor trading it criticized other parties for, with it often supporting the DNVP, NSDAP, and KPD in the Reichstag, though the group would go on to refuse coalitions with the SPD in the future.

=== Rise to Prominence ===
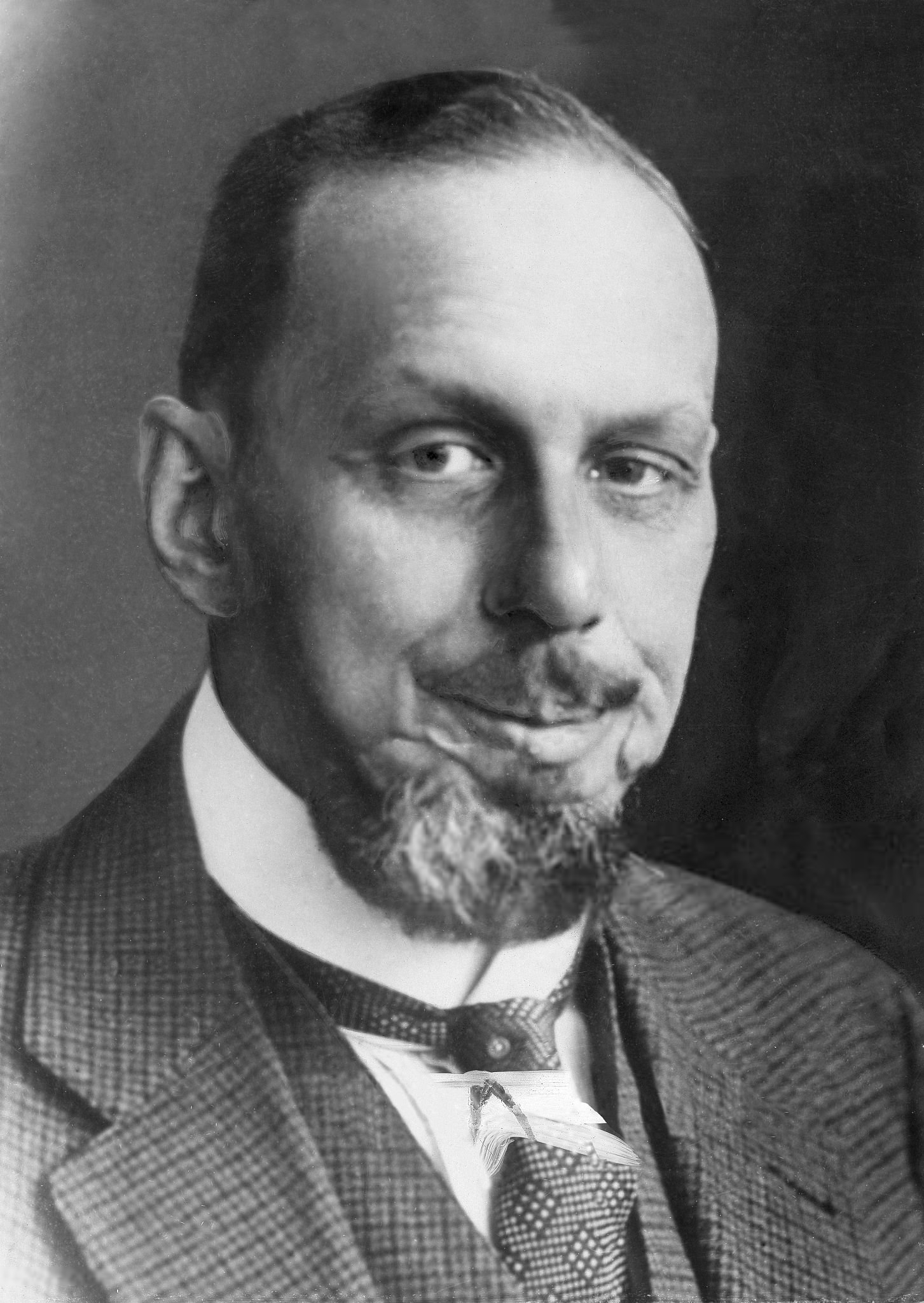
Johann Viktor Bredt

The WP quickly attracted the interest of organized housing interests headed by the former DNVP politician Johann Viktor Bredt. Bredt’s allies in the Prussian chapter of the Central Association of Home and Property Owners’ Organization, a lobby for housing interests, threw their full support behind the Party in the 1921 Prussian State Elections and were rewarded when the WP won it first representation in a State Landtag with 4 seats, the party also performed well in the 1921 Mecklenburg-Schwerin election winning 2 seats. Many artisans were also homeowners, which the WP attempted to capitalize on by getting artisans organizations to endorse the party, but these hopes were crushed when the National Association of German Artisanry and the Christian conservative Christian Middle Class rejected the founding of the WP and refused to align with any particular party in order to remain flexible to the changing political climate, though individual artisans still made up a large share of the party's voterbase. Because of its relationship with housing interests, in its early history the WP was often viewed as a puppet of organized housing interests. In 1925, following a recommendation from Bredt — who was the party's best known member — the party changed its name from the Economic Party of the German Middle Classes to the Reich Party of the German Middle Classes. The name change was intended to overcome the WP's perception as a special interest party and to broaden its appeal among Germany's middle-class voters. Nevertheless, the previous name remained more widely used.

The party had been quite successful up until this point, but it needed a more coherent ideological identity to make it appear more legitimate to its potential voters. The party held its first national congress in Breslau in April 1921, here they would resolve this ideological problem with a rudimentary party program. The party program was made up of two primary parts.

1. Identifying the party with the material interests of the homeowners and the artisans, the two social groups most important in the party's rise
2. An ideological program which espoused Classical Liberalism, Middle Class interests, and cultural Christian conservatism.

Early in its history WP took a large degree of support away from the DDP, attacking the DDP for being too friendly with the SPD and Jews and as a party of Big business and banks, while the WP's Christianity helped it attract voters from the secular DDP. The DDP and the DVP (who had also lost voters to the WP) responded by attacking the party for its narrow focus and its rampant materialism. During the campaign for the May and December 1924 elections the WP sought to capitalize on anti-capitalist sentiments which had existed in the middle class since the hyperinflationary crisis, while also capitalizing on anti-communism and the legacy of the November revolution within the middle class. The party first appeared in the Reichstag in May 1924 election achieving 7 seats.

In June 1926, the WP held its first national party congress in Görlitz and established their new party program called the Görlitz Guidelines (German: Görlitzer Richtlinien). The work of Saxon party leader Walther Wilhelm, the Görlitz Guidelines first outlined the WP's support for republicanism while also undermining this position by calling for government authority to be freed from the "excesses of popular sovereingty". More significantly the program worked the incorporate the demands of the various groups within the German middle class into a Corporatist platform, reducing the influence of Liberalism within the party and distancing it further from Germany's two Liberal parties the DDP and the DVP. With the new party program, the Business Party's transformation from a party easily stigmatized as an agent for organized housing interests into one that claimed to represent the entire spectrum of the German middle class was finished. All of this, including the choice of Görlitz as the site of the party congress, was part of a conscious effort to give the WP the best possible chances in the upcoming Saxon elections. This proved successful when in the 1926 Saxon Landtag elections provided the WP achieved 10.1 percent of the vote and received a very useful platform for validating themselves as the party of the Middle Class and their discontent. The late 1920s saw many artisans in particular join the party, with the support of artisans organizations contributing to its particularly strong performances in Saxony and Thuringia while artisans interests gained almost total control of the party in Hamburg.

=== 1928 Elections ===
Among the German Right, the campaign for the 1928 Reichstag elections was dominated above all else by electoral attacks of various special interests parties such as CNBLP and the WP. The WP, which had been steadily growing at the expense of the other right wing parties since their founding, continued to campaign for the support of the parts of the middle-class that had not benefited from Germany's economic stabilization in the late 1920's. The party utilized anti-parliamentary rhetoric, among other things calling for the end of "cursed parliamentarism". On 18 March 1928 Drewitz and the leaders of a nonpartisan organization known as the Reich Cartel of the German Middle Class (German: Reichskartell des deutschen Mittelstandes) launched with a series of demonstrations throughout the country under the slogan “Mittelstand in Not.” This initiative reached its high point in Berlin, where several thousand small business owners closed their shops and took to the streets in protest against high taxes, rent controls, and excessive government spending. Though officially nonpartisan, the demonstrations gave the WP a great opportunity for attacking other parties. They focused their attacks on the DNVP, especially for their support of the 1927 work hours law, which put more restrictions on working hours. The party improved their performance and won 23 seats. This improvement came down to a multitude of factors since 1924 the party had made great inroads into the organizational structures of the skilled trades, especially in northwest Germany. But the primary reason for their gains was stated by the executive direction of the Westphalian Craftsmens' Association: that the other parties had continued to insufficiently meet the economic demands of the middle class, leading many to flee to the WP.

In cabinet negotiations following the elections, president Paul von Hindenburg had asked the WP to consider joining the Second Müller Cabinet, however in a meeting between the President and Drewitz, Drewitz had stated that Müller was simply unwilling to assent to the economic demands of the WP, thus pushing them into a position of opposition which they did not desire. The WP had demanded, among other things, the enforcement of laws against cartels, the reduction of taxes on department stores, and abolition of the housing allocation system. The other parties were worried about the continued opposition of a party who had only gained at the expense of them, and thought of the WP as unreliable. Though the DVP still hoped to potentially bring them into the Reich or even Prussian government, the compromises needed to make sure the nominally anti-socialist WP could coalition with the SPD were deemed too much of a risk for the WP to take.

During the 1929 Young Plan Referendum WP voters were disproportionately likely to support it, with statistical analysis showing that roughly 1/3 WP voters in the 1928 election voted in favor of the referendum.

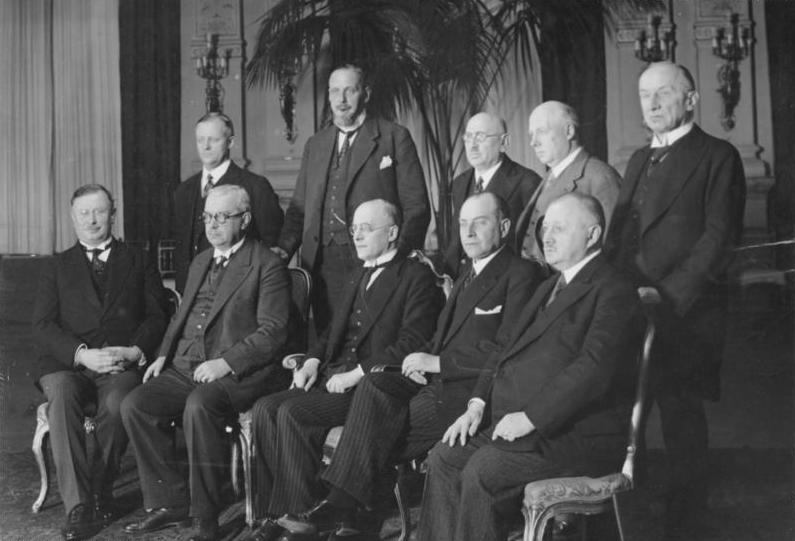
Brüning I Cabinet, with Bredt standing second from left in the back row.

After the collapse of Müller's cabinet in March 1930, the WP participated in cabinet negotiations to form the first Brüning cabinet. Due to the necessity of having the support of as many of the parties in-between the SPD and DNVP he could, Brüning was willing to negotiate with them. Initially it was expected that the WP would oppose a minority government dependent on the SPD, but either due to Brüning threatening to reveal WP corruption or Bredt's influence they agreed to join the government. The WP asked for the Ministry of Justice, thinking it would be the best ministry to advance the cause of the middle class, due to it writing the instructions on how to implement laws. Though Brüning had planned on giving it to the DVP, he accepted their demand. The party was also given large concessions towards property owners and a sales tax surcharge on large department stores and consumer cooperatives, long desired by shopowners. Further conflict arose over the perceived marginalization of conservatives and the domination of the Zentrum in cabinet, and some in the WP didn't want to join a government dependent on the SPD, but the cabinet was successfully formed in the same month, with Johann Victor Bredt as Justice minister.

=== Decline ===
However, in late 1930, the WP began to decline. A series of disputes divided the party, eventually tearing the party asunder. In the party's 1929 Berlin congress, Carl Ladendorff — the leader of the party in Prussia — attempted to create an independent parliamentary leadership for the WP, separate from the party's leadership. Ladendorff strived to reduce the power of the WP's chairman, Hermann Drewitz, who he thought vain and believed the party concentrated excessive powers in. However, his attempt to reduce Drewitz's powers failed. Thereafter Ladendorff attempted to oust Drewitz as chair, a view which was reflected by deputy chair Otto Colosser.

Following the 1930 Reichstag election, the party retained all of its seats, but the increase in Reichstag members meant the party's relative influence in the Reichstag nevertheless declined. As a result of the election, the WP left Brüning's cabinet and introduced a no-confidence motion, with Bredt losing his role as Justice Minister. This decision divided the party; while Drewitz was in favour of withdrawing, Bredt supported Brüning's government. As a result, Drewitz kept his plans for withdrawal in secret, silently gaining support from the party without Bredt's knowledge. When the WP announced its succession from the cabinet, Bredt considered leaving the party though decided to remain within it. While the WP's withdrawal did not collapse Brüning's cabinet, as he still possessed a narrow majority of votes, it nevertheless weakened his position. Furthermore, deputy chair Otto Colosser was left discontented with the whole dispute. Near the end of the year, Colosser accused Drewitz of embezzlement, even launching a formal legal complaint against him. This dispute further divided the party, eventually leading to Colosser's resignation from the WP and Drewitz's re-election as chairman. However, a fourth dispute soon engulfed the WP, with former Saxon finance minister Hugo Weber — a supporter of Ladendorff and Colosser's attempts to remove Drewitz — leading the influential Saxon branch of the WP in seceding from the federal party. Weber and the Saxons were soon joined by Max Robert Gerstenhauer's Thuringian branch, who also announced their succession from the federal party. Following negotiations, Drewitz was able to reign in the Saxons, with Weber and his supporters rejoining the party; Drewitz had defeated every leadership challenge against him. Nevertheless, Drewitz resigned from the chairmanship in August 1931, replaced with Bredt. Bredt's influence on the WP and his support for Brüning resulted in the WP upholding Brüning's cabinets in every confidence vote after October 1930.

Concurrently, the party faced a succession of crises. In 1929, the Prussian SPD accused Ladendorff of financial irregularities regarding the Dessauer Realkreditbank. Before entering into politics, Ladendorff had served as a Reichsbank manager. Ladendorff was able to quickly resolve the allegations, but only after media attention to the accusation. In late 1931 two deputies of the Prussian branch of the WP left the party and formed a new group — the radical middlestrand; two other deputies of the national Reichstag joined the Nazi party. In the same period, the party's financial situation deteriorated after the Deutsche Mittelstandsbank, a subsidiary of the Berliner Bank für Handel und Grundbesitz owned by the Ladendorff conglomerate collapsed due to the ongoing Great Depression. Following further allegations of corruption and financial irregularities stemming from the collapse of his bank, Ladendorff resigned as leader of the Prussian WP; the party lost one its most effective leaders. With the rise of the NSDAP, the WP in Prussia was left decrepit, and in the 1932 Prussian state election the party failed to secure a single seat. The party's presence in the Prussian Landtag was over. The party attempted to counter the Nazi's by arguing from a position of economic self interest, though the party still spent more time attacking communists and socialists over the Nazis. Their decline in Prussia was reflected federally, with the party winning only two seats in the July 1932 Reichstag election, a single seat in the November 1932 Reichstag election. Following this disastrous result, the party attempted a final desperate revival at their yearly party congress held in Charlottenburg but a lack of resources and Nazi violence prevented this from having any major impact, with the party losing their final seat in the March 1933 Reichstag election. With the Nazi Party in control of the government, the party was finally dissolved.

=== Successor parties ===
Following the end of Nazi rule and the Second World War, a series of small unofficial successors parties to the WP emerged, the most notable of these being the Economic Reconstruction Union. Under former WP member Alfred Loritz the party would win 2.87% of the vote and 12 seats in the 1949 West German election, though the party would suffer from internal conflicts and defections before dissolving soon after the 1953 election.

== State Branches ==
=== Saxony ===
Saxony remained economically behind the rest of Germany during the Weimar Republic and never shared in the benefits of Germany's short-lived “return to normalcy” in the second half of the 1920s. Because of this, special-interest parties like the WP and the Reich Party for People's Justice performed better in Saxony than in the country as a whole.

The party enjoyed its strongest following in Saxony during the 1920s and when it first contested the Landtag of Saxony elections in 1924 it received 7.9% of the vote in Chemnitz-Zwickau, the only district in which it stood. In 1926 the party co-operated with the German People's Party, DNVP and the Reich Party for Civil Rights and Deflation in a pact against "red parties" in Saxony, arguing that the left was using that state to launch its assault on the Weimar Republic in order to establish communism in Germany. The pact was not a success however as a Social Democratic Party of Germany government took office in the state and before the WP was squabbling with their Reich Party allies over the issue of property revaluation (which WP opposed and the Reich Party supported). Nonetheless, their support in Saxony was reflected in the 1928 Reichstag election, where the party's 8.5% vote share was by some distance their highest in the country. This fell to 7.3% in 1930 and to as low as 1% in July 1932 by which the WP, which had flirted with anti-parliamentary rhetoric and corporatism, saw its support transfer to the Nazi Party in Saxony as was the case elsewhere.

In the midst of the party's decline the Saxony WP nearly broke away from the rest of the party, but Drewitz managed to reel them back in, though the whole controversy greatly weakened the party and Drewitz's leadership over it.

=== Prussia ===
Carl Ladendorff in 1931

The Prussian WP was led by the nationalist Carl Ladendorff, who had funded the initial campaign for the WP in Prussia. The branch was further to the right than the party as a whole, with it being especially nationalist, anti-catholic, and anti-socialist. Unlike other state branches, the Prussian WP was much closer aligned to the DNVP, with it agreeing with the DNVP on almost every issue besides criticizing the DNVP for its heavy lobbing for rural interests. The party was continuously in opposition and voted against every government propped motion in the Prussian Landtag from 1921 to 1929, but broke this streak by voting in the favor of the Prussian Concordat after Otto Braun had personally met with Bredt. In the aftermath of the 1928 Prussian election, the DVP attempted to include both themselves and the WP in a coalition, but they abandoned this idea as the Prussian WP was simply to far-right for it to work.

After the September 1930 German Election and seeing the rapid destabilization of German society, the WP made a sudden turn to the left. It began to focus its political efforts not on opposing the Weimar Coalition, which it had described as a socialist dictatorship, and began instead attacking the DNVP for its radical turn. Despite its attacks on the DNVP, the Prussian WP actually had a favorable view of the Nazis. Ladendorff had a good relationship with Prussian Nazi leader Wilhelm Kube, and the party saw Kube's Strasserist anti-capitalism as evidence that they supported the interest of small business owners. Despite this sudden turn, the party still hemorrhaged support like the rest of the WP and lost all of its seats in the 1932 Prussian election.

In 1932, in an attempt to prevent its electoral decline, the Prussian WP attempted to get the voting age from 20 to 25, though all other parties opposed this as unconstitutional and partisan.

=== Hamburg ===
The WP first spread to Hamburg in fall of 1925, the party contained representatives from the city's small businesses, hotels/taverns, homeowners, and artisans. But as time went on the influx of artisans to the national party also occurred in Hamburg and they gained increasing power. After the 1928 German election the party underwent a massive power struggle which ended with the artisans in near complete control of the party. The WP's influence within Hamburg remained marginal, with the party plateauing at 4% support in 1927, this was because the artisans takeover of the party in 1928 turned the party into a party of artisans, who numbered only a small percentage of the city's population.

As the Nazi's began rising the Hamburg WP tried to argue that the Nazis did not take the interest of the artisans into account, that they were dominated by other social classes, (Note: As said in one election rally "Hitler’s delegates were all pensioned officers, public officials, party functionaries and landlords.") and by trying to push the Nazis out of the overton window, but the Nazis meteoric rise continued and they took the majority of the WP's voteshare, due to the WP being viewed as ineffective by the artisans. With their rise being helped by the fact that the artisans generally did not vote on ideology but on who best represented their interests.

=== Lübeck ===
Lübeck was the most electorally successfully state for WP. With the party winning 26.54% of the vote and 21 of 80 seats in the 1924 Lübeck state election. In Lübeck the party had a close relationship with the local landowners party, with the two parties being somewhat merged.

=== Bavaria ===
The Bavarian WP was never as successful as the other branches, it never won a seat in the Bavarian Landtag and would merge with the Bavarian Branch of the DVP in 1932.

== Demographics ==
The party would go on to bring together together a collection of almost entirely urban, often-contradictory, middle-class interests. The party incorporated artisans, property owners, small and medium businessmen, pensioners, professionals, and bureaucrats whose commonality was the degradation of their status caused by inflation. These groups had contradictory views of how the economy should be run. The artisans had a more corporatist mentality and demanded protection against the ‘‘excesses of free competition,’’ while property owners generally called for a restoration of classical laissez-faire economics. The WP did not dominate the middle class vote, as some went with either the DNVP or one of the two liberal parties (the DVP and the DDP), whilst others preferred more radical right alternatives, but generally the WP emerged as the main group to specifically target the middle classes for its support. The party’s primary policy goals were usually whatever best served the Middle Class at that particular moment, and served as a party for dissatisfied middle class voters among all parties.

The party was predominantly Protestant, although Catholics peaked at 1/3 of party membership and there was also a minority of Jews in the party, some of whom held leadership positions. Despite the prevalence of anti-Catholicism and antisemitism in the party, the shared middle class interests of the party's members managed to largely overcome sectarian differences within the party.

== Newspaper ==
The party's newspaper was the Deutsche Mittelstandt-Zeitung, the newspaper had existed since 1908 but the WP gained control of the party until 1932 when the newspaper ceased publication.

== Election results ==
WP federal election results
Election	Votes	%	Seats	+/–
May 1924	500,820	1.71	7 / 472 (1%)	▲7
December 1924	692,963	2.29	12 / 493 (2%)	▲5
1928	1,387,602	4.54	23 / 491 (5%)	▲11
1930	1,361,762	3.95	23 / 577 (4%)	0
July 1932	146,876	0.40	2 / 608 (0.3%)	▼21
November 1932	110,309	0.31	1 / 585 (0.2%)	▼1
March 1933	—N/a		0 / 647 (0%)	▼1
