= 1919 Lübeck state election =

German state election

- 9 February 1919
- All 80 seats in the Bürgerschaft of Lübeck; 41 seats needed for a majority
- Turnout: 81.4%
| Party | Vote % | Seats | +/– |
|---|---|---|---|
| Social Democratic Party | 52.5% | 42 | |
| German Democratic Party | 36.3% | 29 | |
| German National People's Party | 7.3% | 6 | |
| Rural People (Landleute) | 4.0% | 3 | |
This lists parties that won seats. See the complete results below.

The 1919 Lübeck state election was held on 9 February 1919 to elect the 80 members of the Bürgerschaft, the city-state parliament of the Free and Hanseatic City of Lübeck. It was the first fully democratic election in Lübeck’s history, conducted under universal suffrage and proportional representation.

The election was dominated by the Social Democratic Party (SPD), which received a clear majority of the vote. The liberal German Democratic Party (DDP) also performed strongly. The Landleute was associated with the German National People's Party (DNVP).

The newly elected assembly was responsible for drafting a democratic constitution for the city-state, which was adopted on 13 May 1920. The new constitution aligned Lübeck's political structure with the Weimar Constitution.

The state parliament operated alongside Lübeck’s mayor, Emil Ferdinand Fehling.

== Results ==
| Party | Votes | % | Seats |
|---|---|---|---|
| Social Democratic Party of Germany | 19,556 | 52.46 | 42 |
| German Democratic Party | 13,528 | 36.29 | 29 |
| German National People's Party | 2,710 | 7.27 | 6 |
| Rural People (Landleute) | 1,481 | 3.97 | 3 |
| Total | 37,275 | 100.00 | 80 |
| Valid votes | 37,275 | 99.11 | |
| Invalid/blank votes | 336 | 0.89 | |
| Total votes | 37,611 | 100.00 | |
| Registered voters/turnout | 46,229 | 81.36 | |
Source: Elections in the Weimar Republic, Elections in Germany
