= Paul Lejeune-Jung =

German economist, politician, lawyer, and resistance fighter (1882–1944)

Paul Lejeune-Jung

Paul Adolf Franz Lejeune-Jung, (actually Lejeune genannt Jung, meaning called Jung) (16 March 1882 in Cologne – 8 September 1944 in Berlin, executed) was a German economist, politician, lawyer in the wood pulp industry, and resistance fighter against Adolf Hitler's Third Reich.

== Early life ==
Lejeune-Jung's roots were in an old Huguenot family in Berlin. Forebears had run the Jungsche Apotheke, still owned by the family, where the writer Theodor Fontane, who trained as a pharmacist, once worked. Committed to the Huguenot tradition, the family was French Reformed. Lejeune-Jung's mother, however, a Catholic Rhinelander, had her children baptized in the Catholic Church, thereby starting the development of a Catholic twig in an otherwise Protestant family tree. As a captain in the British merchant marine, Paul's father was for years at sea, until after being stationed in Hamburg and Cologne, where his son Paul was born, he settled down in Rathenow an der Havel, where he died in 1889.

Paul Lejeune-Jung completed the requirements for his secondary school certificate (Mittlere Reife), and following his mother's wishes, he then went to a humanistic Gymnasium, the Theodorianum in Paderborn, a town with a strong Catholic character. This transfer meant for Lejeune-Jung three years of Greek, and he needed to do some considerable catching-up in Latin. In 1901 came the Abitur, and thereafter the beginning of Lejeune-Jung's studies in theology, with a view to becoming a Catholic priest. After a few semesters, however, he changed his mind and his specialization, and chose instead to go to the University of Bonn to devote himself to studying philosophy and history. In the latter discipline, Lejeune-Jung earned, under the mediaevalist Alois Schulte, a doctorate in philosophy whose theme was "Walther von Palearia, Chancellor of the Norman-Hohenstaufen Empire".

== Professional career ==
Lejeune-Jung broadened his understanding of scientific principles as he was busying himself with studies in economics and economic history at the Humboldt University in Berlin. The year 1907 marked the beginning of his practice-oriented career. Until 1909, he worked as an economic assistant in the Imperial Colonial Office (Reichskolonialamt) and in the German Colonial Company (Deutsche Kolonialgesellschaft) so that he could transfer to the pulp and paper industry in 1910, where he met with professional success at Feldmühle AG.

In 1913, Lejeune-Jung wed Hedwig Foltmann, a salesman's daughter from Breslau (nowadays Wrocław, Poland). They had three daughters and five sons. After Lejeune-Jung worked in the wartime raw materials department, wool unit, at the Prussian War Ministry, he found his definitive professional niche as managing director of the Association of German Pulp Makers (Verein Deutscher Zellstofffabrikanten). This was also the starting point for his later political career.

== Political career ==
Early on, Lejeune-Jung had connections with the German National People's Party (DNVP), for whom he was elected in 1924 as the only Catholic member of the Reichstag from Middle Silesia, representing the electoral district of Breslau. In the November election that same year, he was reëlected, and in the years that followed, he was member and chairman of the trade policy board, taking part in the International Parliamentary Conferences in London (1926), Rio de Janeiro (1927) and Berlin (1929).

An undated written record connected with a memorandum whose author was Lejeune-Jung bears witness to the beginning of the 1920s in Germany. In it, the proposed founding of the Imperial Board of Catholics in the German National People's Party is communicated to the Fulda Bishops' Conference. Lejeune-Jung thereby showed himself to be a representative of the so-called rightwing Catholics, who were monarchists, quite unlike the republican-oriented Catholic Centre Party. The writers also explicitly distanced themselves from the Centre Party, "which denies the outcome of every force of God, and instead declares the disastrous heresy of the people's sovereignty." The rightwing Catholics did not stand alone with their polemic against the Centre Party. Indeed, even within the Centre Party itself by 1919, a dispute had arisen among Catholics as to Catholics' relationship with the republican form of government.

His political position as a Reichstag member with fundamental conservative convictions notwithstanding, Lejeune-Jung belonged to the moderate forces within the DNVP, who managed to bring themselves to practise positive coöperation in the Weimar State. Lejeune-Jung belonged to the conservative German Gentlemen's Club (Deutscher Herrenklub). The petition for a referendum against the Young Plan (1929), sought by DNVP chairman Alfred Hugenberg, brought about Lejeune-Jung's – and 11 other members' – departure from the DNVP faction, which meant for him having to give up a secure place on the party list. This secessionist grouping founded on 28 January 1930 the "People's Conservative Union" ("Volkskonservative Vereinigung"), and also joined themselves on 23 July with the Westarp Group – who themselves had been barred from the DNVP – to form the "Conservative People's Party" ("Konservative Volkspartei"). The new party, however, did not fare well in the September 1930 election, having only four members returned. Lejeune-Jung, who won no seat, temporarily took up management, but then on 11 June 1932, he joined the Centre Party, with whose right wing he had already had ties even before 1920.

Chancellor Heinrich Brüning had already named Lejeune-Jung as an expert to the German-French Economic Commission in 1931. In the analysis of German-French economic relationships, which Lejeune-Jung undertook in a chronicle under the title "Parisian Impressions, 30 March to 10 April 1930", his skill at precise observation and exact political reasoning became apparent. The core of his supranational concept envisaged coöperation among European states in the economic domain on the basis of a German-French understanding. Lejeune-Jung floated the idea for a European market in which such sectors as the potash industry, heavy industry, the automobile industry and the electrical industry played a central role. He had not, however, overlooked the protectionist mindset that French economic leaders and politicians displayed during discussions about concrete measures, which only bore on a customs union limited to agricultural products, anyway.

== Resistance activities ==
With the rise of the Nazi dictatorship after 30 January 1933, Lejeune-Jung was pushed out, as were so many in the political fringes. He expressed his hostility towards the Nazi régime in a letter to his friend Treviranus: "The breach of the constitutional order the Reich will, to the bitter end, hand over to a madman, unless Wehrmacht and lawcourts identify the constitutional breach and overthrow the usurper."

In 1941–1942, Lejeune-Jung got his first knowledge of concrete plans for a resistance against the unjust Nazi state. Through the former trade unionist Max Habermann came contact with Carl Friedrich Goerdeler, the former Mayor of Leipzig and head of the civilian resistance. At his behest, Lejeune-Jung drafted a politicoeconomic plan for the time after the dictatorship were successfully overthrown. In a memorandum from early summer 1943, called "Basic Reich Law on Reich Economic Easements", Lejeune-Jung named Reich ownership of mineral wealth, socialization of key industries, and state monopolies on transport, insurance, and foreign trade as vital bases of the new economic system. At least two meetings took place at Lejeune-Jung's house during 1943, in which important members of the resistance took part. Among them were the aforesaid Max Habermann, Hermann Kaiser, Wilhelm Leuschner and Julius Leber as well as Friedrich-Werner Graf von der Schulenburg, former ambassador to Moscow, and Josef Wirmer. Although Lejeune-Jung's revolutionary politicoeconomic visions did not meet with every resistance member's approval, Goerdeler latched onto him as the future economics minister in his post-Hitler cabinet.

== Arrest, trial, and death ==
The failure of the 20 July Plot to assassinate Adolf Hitler with a briefcase bomb at the Wolf's Lair in East Prussia, to whose concrete planning, going by statements that he made before the Volksgerichtshof, Lejeune-Jung was not privy, brought all plans for a democratic government in the German Reich to an abrupt end. Like thousands of others who were to a greater or lesser extent involved in the 20 July resistance movement as a whole, Lejeune-Jung became a victim of the Nazi rulers' barbaric revenge operation, which was unparalleled in German history. After being arrested on 11 August 1944, he was brought to the Gestapo prison on Lehrter Straße in Berlin. On 3 September, the Volksgerichtshof chief prosecutor Lautz laid charges of high treason and treason against him. Among the co-accused were Goerdeler, Wirmer and Leuschner, all members of the formerly foreseen new government.

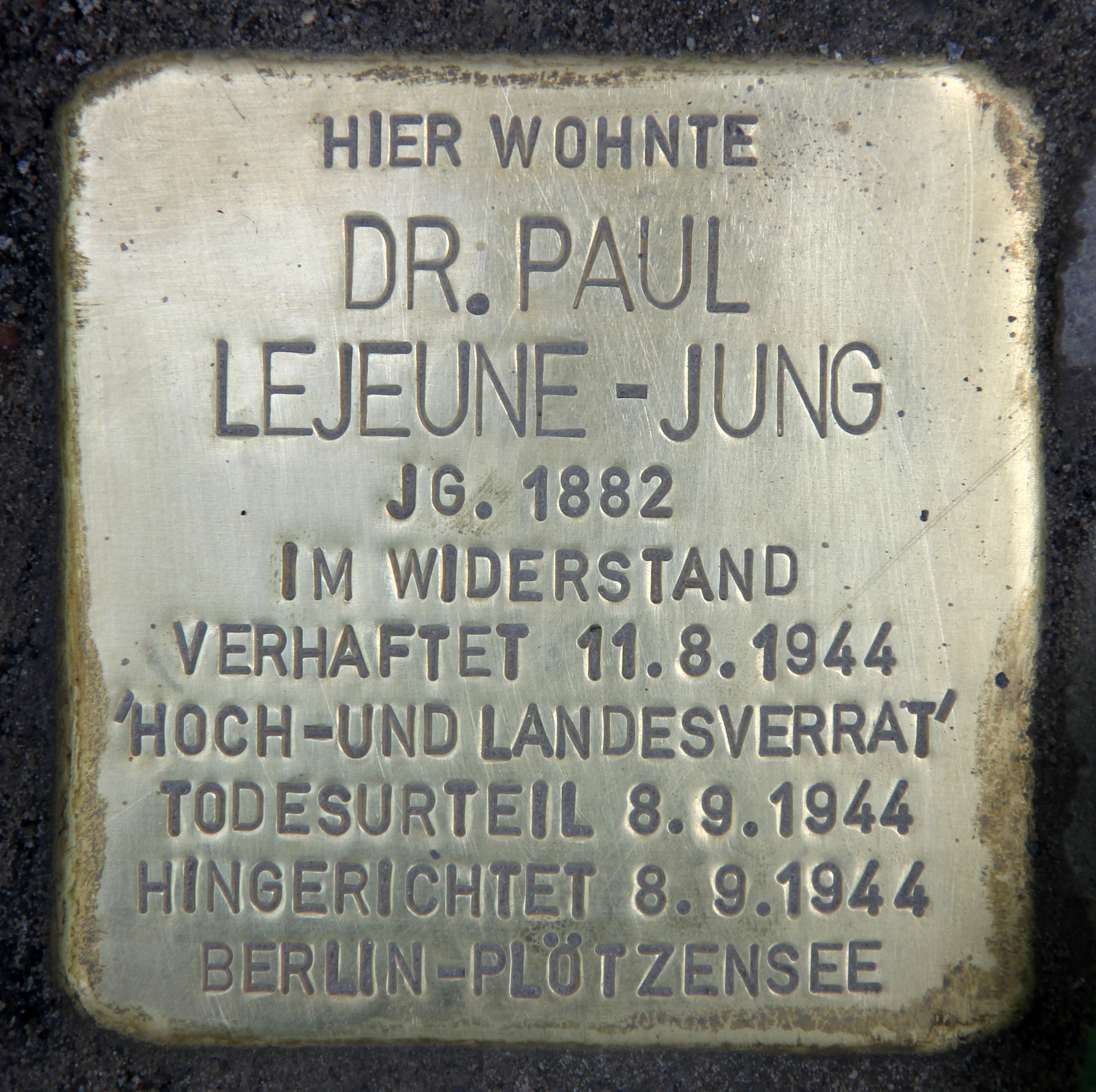

In the course of the proceedings on 7 and 8 September, Lejeune-Jung became just as much a victim of Volksgerichtshof President Roland Freisler's infamous handling of trials as many others before and after him. On 8 September 1944, the second day of the trial, the accused Carl Friedrich Goerdeler, Wilhelm Leuschner, Josef Wirmer, Ulrich von Hassel and Paul Lejeune-Jung were sentenced to death by hanging. Together with the aforesaid charges, Leujeune-Jung was also found guilty of defeatism and supporting the enemy. Leujeune-Jung, Wirmer and von Hassel were put to death that same day at Plötzensee Prison in Berlin. Paul Lejeune-Jung went to his death with the words "My Jesus, mercy." His family's enquiries brought to light that the bodies had been taken on Hitler's orders to the Wedding Crematorium, whereafter the ashes had been scattered at an unknown location.

== Written works ==
- Kolonial- und Reichskonferenzen. Wege und Ziele des britischen Imperialismus. Berlin 1917;
- Walther von Palearia, Kanzler des normannisch-staufischen Reiches (dissertation), Bonn o. J.

== Literature ==
- Becker, J.: "Die Deutsche Zentrumspartei 1918–1933", in Aus Politik und Zeitgeschichte, supplement to weekly newspaper Das Parlament B 11/68, Bonn 1968, 3ff.
- Bracher, Karl Dietrich: Das Gewissen steht auf. Lebensbilder aus dem deutschen Widerstand 1933–1945. Mainz 1984; Chronicle of the Archbishopric of Berlin, Internet: http://www.kath.de/bistum/berlin
- Hoffmann, Peter: Widerstand, Staatsstreich, Attentat: Der Kampf der Opposition gegen Hitler. München 1985
- Hohmann, G. F. et al.: Deutsche Patrioten in Widerstand und Verfolgung 1933–1945, Paderborn 1986
- Jonas, E.: Die Volkskonservativen 1928–1933, Düsseldorf 1965
- Leber, A. (publisher): Das Gewissen steht auf: 64 Lebensbilder aus dem Deutschen Widerstand 1933–1945, Berlin-Frankfurt 1955
- Leber, A. (publisher): Das Gewissen entscheidet, Bereiche des deutschen Widerstandes von 1933–1945 in Lebensbildern, Berlin-Frankfurt 1957
- Maier, H.. "Symbol der inneren Reinigung - Die moralischen und juristischen Aspekte des 20. Juli 1944", in: Anstöße, Beiträge zur Kultur- und Verfassungspolitik, Stuttgart 1978, 44 ff.
- Morsey, R.. Die Deutsche Zentrumspartei 1917–1923, Düsseldorf 1966
- Morsey, R. (ed.), Zeitgeschichte in Lebensbildern: Aus dem deutschen Katholizismus des 19. und 20. Jahrhunderts, Mainz 1973
- Olles, Werner: "Katholizismus, Abendland, Nation", in: Düsseldorfer Tageblatt v. 19 September 1997
- Peter, K.H. (ed.): Spiegelbild einer Verschwörung. Die Kaltenbrunner-Berichte an Bormann und Hitler über das Attentat vom 20. Juli 1944, Stuttgart 1961
- Schmädeke, Jürgen u. Steinbach, Peter (eds.), Der Widerstand gegen den Nationalsozialismus. Die deutsche Gesellschaft und der Widerstand gegen Hitler. München 1986
