= Hermann Drewitz =

Member of the Reichstag
- In office 27 May 1924 – 4 June 1932

Personal details
- Born: 18 September 1887 Coswig, Free State of Anhalt, Germany
- Died: 25 January 1955 (aged 67)
- Party: Economic Party, 1920–1933; Christian Democratic Union of Germany, 1946–1955

Hermann Drewitz (18 September 1887 – 25 January 1955) was a German politician and master baker who founded and led the Economic Party during the Weimar Republic. He held the chairmanship of the Economic Party for all but a single year of its existence (1920–1931; 1932–1933). Drewitz served in numerous elected offices over multiple periods of German history. During the Weimar Republic, he served as a member of the Reichstag between 1924–1932 and in the Prussian Landtag from 1924–1928. After World War I, from 1946 to 1955 he served on the Berlin City Assembly and the West Berlin House of Representatives.

== Biography ==
After going to middle school in the town of Coswig, Drewitz completed a bakers apprenticeship in Dessau. He then traveled around as a journeyman and passed the test to become a "master baker" in Berlin-Mahlsdorf. During World War 1 he served a soldier in the German Army. After the Nazi's rise to power he was imprisoned on several occasions.

Drewitz was a member of a municipal council from 1919 to 1921. He also was a founder of the Reich Party of the German Middle Class (often called the Economic Party) and served as the party's leader from 1920 to 1931 and again from 1932 to 1933. He lived in Berlin and was a member of the Prussian Landtag from 1921 to 1928. In the December 1924 Reichstag election, he was elected to the Reichstag, where he served until July 1932. There, he was chairman of the WP parliamentary group from 1924 to 1931.

The end of World War Two saw him return to his previous activity. 1946 he became guild master of the Berlin Bakers Guild and vice-president of the Chamber of Skilled Crafts. Politically with he demise of the Economic Party he joined the CDU and with the party he was elected to the Berlin municipal council in 1946. after the splitting of Berlin, from 1950 to January 1955 a member of the West Berlin House of Representatives. On November 9, 1954, he left the CDU and ran in the 1954 West Berlin Election for the Economic Association of the Middle Class. Though the party only achieved 1.8% of the vote. He died two weeks after the end of his term.
