= 1930 German federal election =

- 14 September 1930

All 577 seats in the Reichstag 289 seats needed for a majority
- Registered: 42,982,912 (▲4.3%)
- Turnout: 82.0% (▲6.4pp)
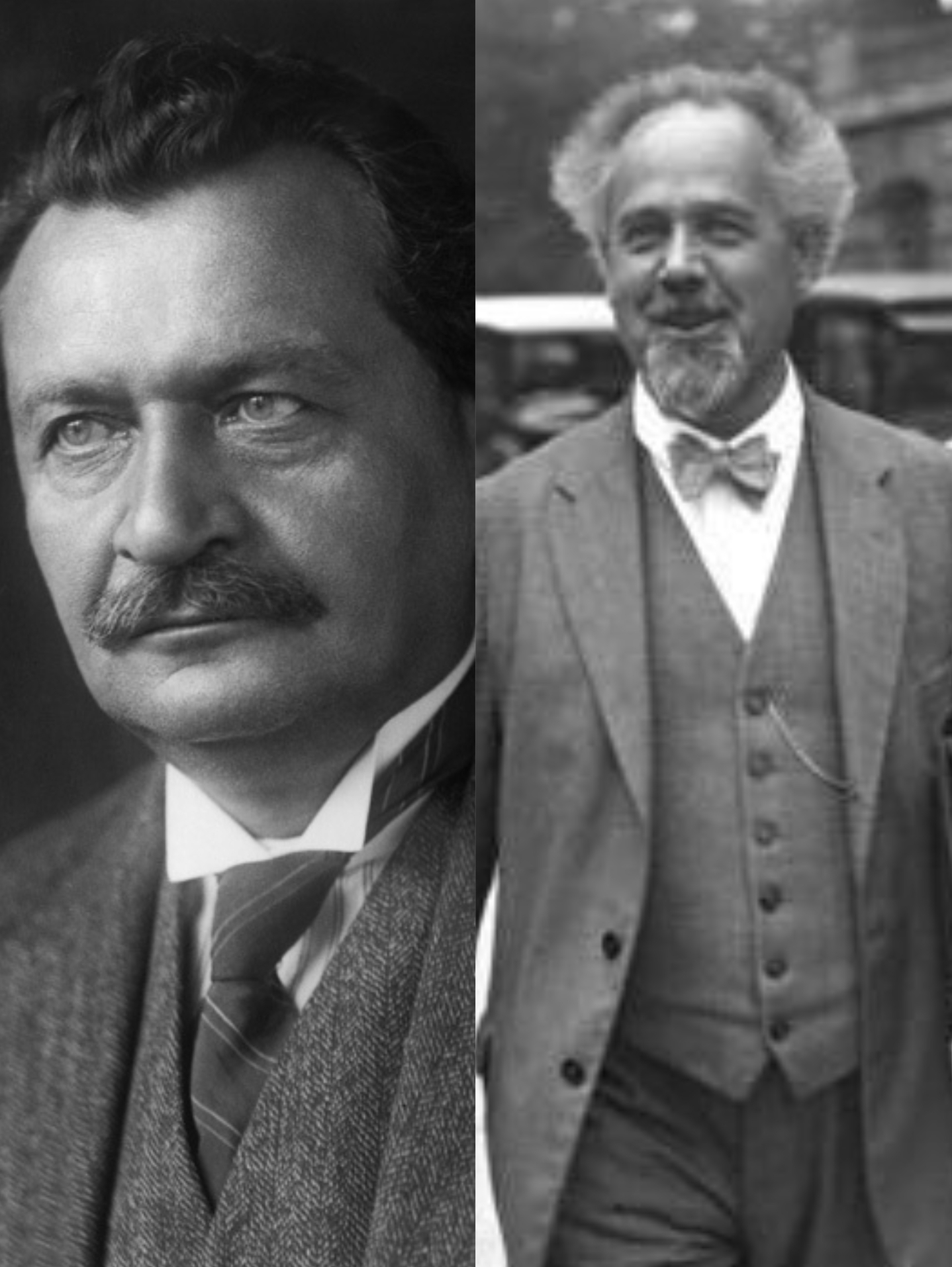

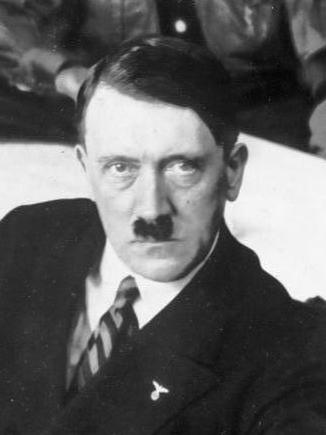

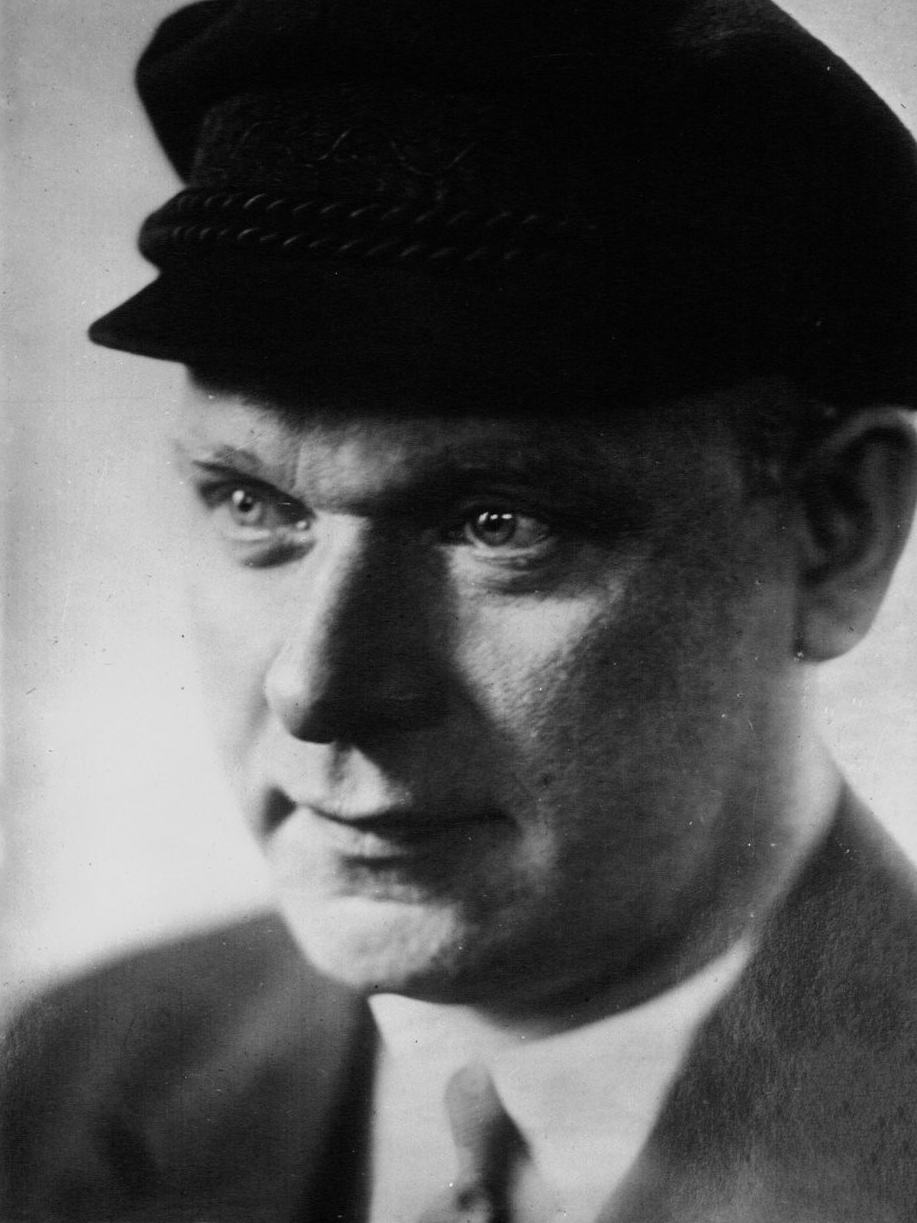

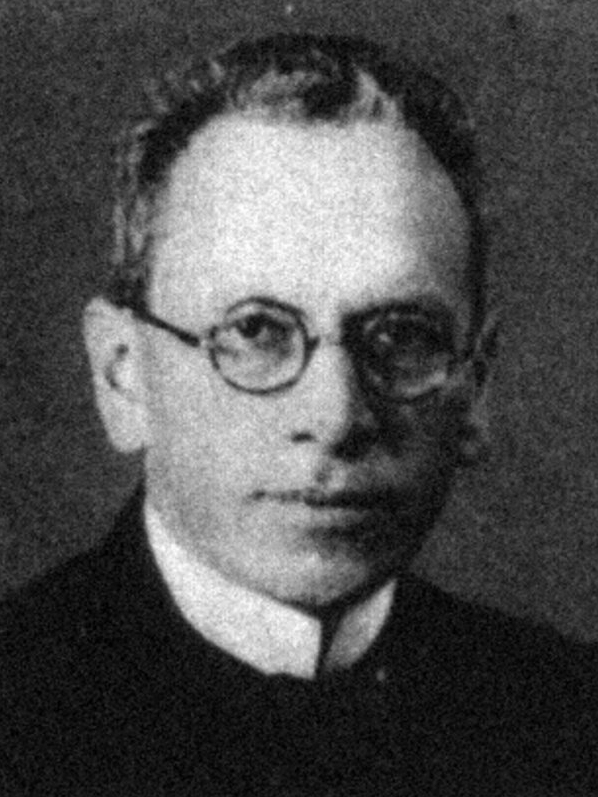

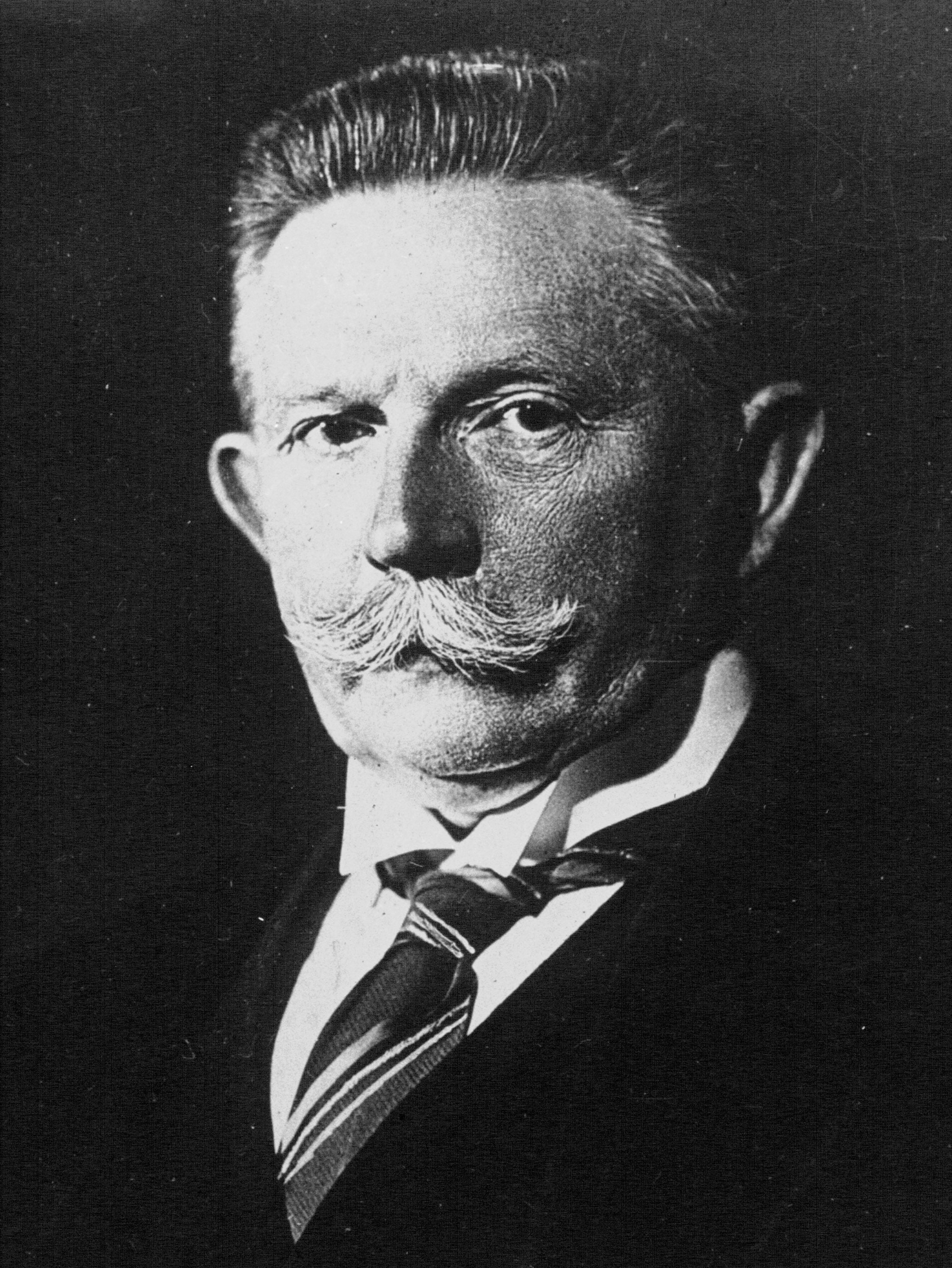

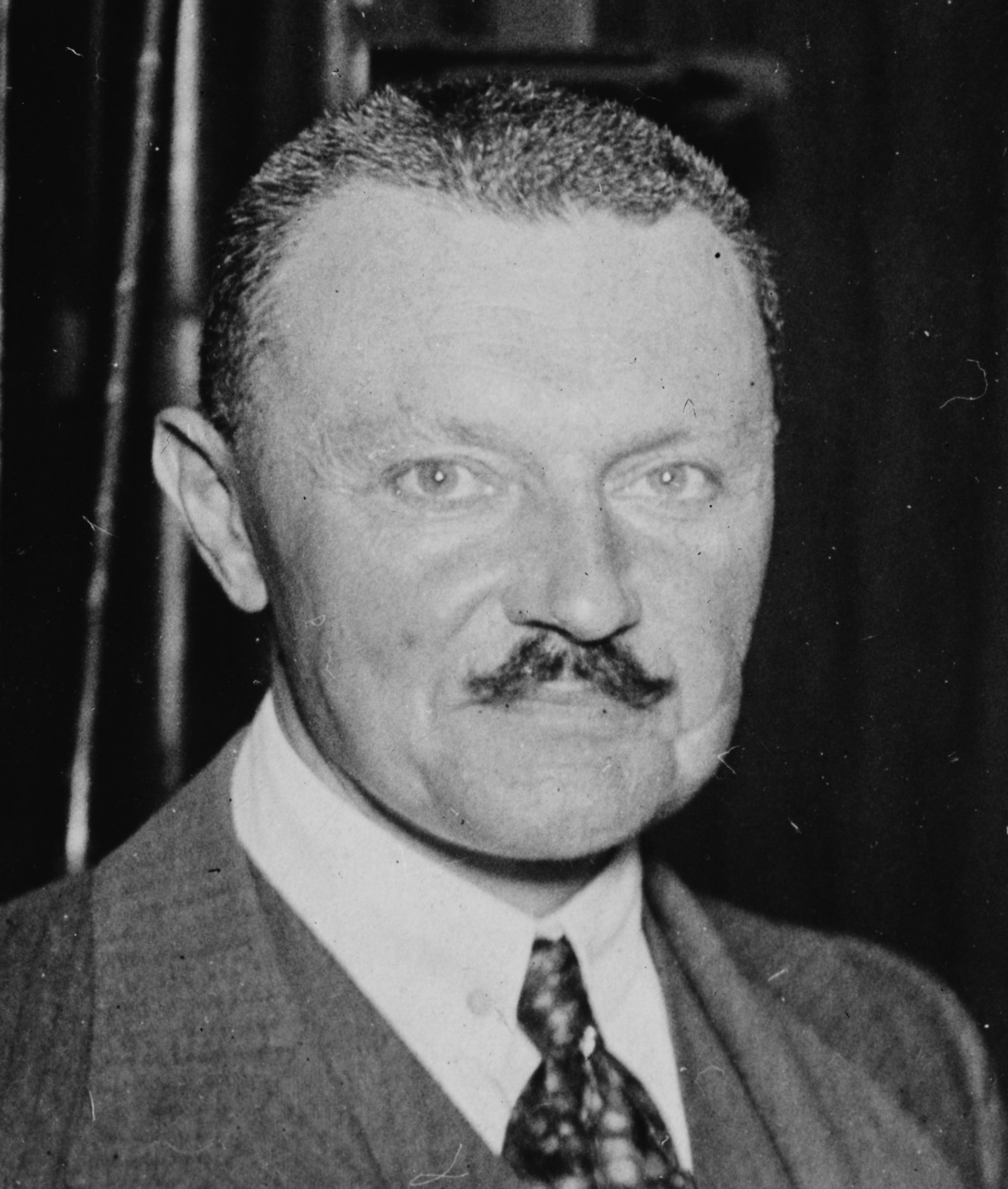
	First party	Second party	Third party
Leader	Otto Wels & Arthur Crispien	Adolf Hitler	Ernst Thälmann
Party	SPD	NSDAP	KPD
Last election	29.8%, 153 seats	2.6%, 12 seats	10.6%, 54 seats
Seats won	143	107	77
Seat change	▼10	▲95	▲23
Popular vote	8,575,244	6,379,672	4,590,160
Percentage	24.5%	18.3%	13.1%
Swing	▼5.3 pp	▲15.7 pp	▲2.5 pp
	Fourth party	Fifth party	Sixth party
Leader	Ludwig Kaas	Alfred Hugenberg	Ernst Scholz
Party	Centre	DNVP	DVP
Last election	12.1%, 61 seats	14.2%, 73 seats	8.7%, 45 seats
Seats won	68	41	30
Seat change	▲7	▼32	▼15
Popular vote	4,127,000	2,457,686	1,577,365
Percentage	11.8%	7.0%	4.5%
Swing	▼0.3 pp	▼7.2 pp	▼4.2 pp
Government before election
First Brüning cabinet
Z–DDP–DVP–WP–BVP–KVP
Government after election
First Brüning cabinet
Z–DDP–DVP–WP–BVP–KVP

A federal election was held in Germany on 14 September 1930 to elect the fifth Reichstag of the Weimar Republic. Despite losing ten seats, the Social Democratic Party of Germany (SPD) remained the largest party in the Reichstag, winning 143 of the 577 seats, while the Nazi Party (NSDAP) dramatically increased its number of seats from 12 to 107. The Communists also increased their parliamentary representation, gaining 23 seats and becoming the third-largest party in the Reichstag.

The government of Chancellor Heinrich Brüning of the Centre Party lost its majority in the Reichstag as a result of the election. With President Paul von Hindenburg's support, his new cabinet became the first of the three presidential cabinets that governed through presidential emergency decrees rather than the parliament.

== Background ==
After the 1928 German federal election, a five-party grand coalition was formed under Hermann Müller of the Social Democratic Party (SPD). Following the collapse of the coalition on 27 March 1930, President Hindenburg appointed Centre Party politician Heinrich Brüning as chancellor. He formed a seven-party coalition government that was two seats short of a majority and did not include the SPD, the party with the most seats in the Reichstag.

Brüning's government was confronted with the economic crisis caused by the Great Depression in Germany. He sought to balance the budget and stimulate exports through a policy of deflation which would require an unpopular policy of tight credit and a rollback of wage and salary increases (an internal devaluation). The Reichstag rejected Brüning's budgetary measures in July. With the backing of President Paul von Hindenburg, the bill was enacted using emergency powers allowed under the Weimar Constitution. The Reichstag then overturned the emergency decree 236 to 222, with the yes votes coming from the Social Democrats, Communists, Nazis and a minority of the German National People's Party. At Brüning's request, Hindenburg dissolved the Reichstag on 18 July 1930. The new election was held on 14 September 1930.

== Electoral system ==
The Reichstag was elected via party list proportional representation. For the purpose, the country was divided into 35 multi-member electoral districts. A party was entitled to a seat for every 60,000 votes won. It was calculated via a three-step process on the constituency level, an intermediate level which combined multiple constituencies, and finally nationwide, where all parties' excess votes were combined. In the third nationwide step, parties could not be awarded more seats than they had already won on the two lower constituency levels. Due to the fixed number of votes per seat, the size of the Reichstag fluctuated between elections based on the number of voters.

The voting age was 20 years. People who were incapacitated according to the Civil Code, who were under guardianship or provisional guardianship, or who had lost their civil rights after a criminal court ruling were not eligible to vote.

The president was directly elected every seven years. He was head of the armed forces and had significant powers to dissolve the Reichstag, nominate a chancellor and invoke emergency powers through Article 48 of the Weimar Constitution.

In 1930, Germany was formally a multi-party parliamentary democracy, with President Paul von Hindenburg (1925–1934) the head of state. However, beginning in March 1930, Hindenburg appointed governments without a parliamentary majority which systematically governed by emergency decrees, circumventing the democratically elected Reichstag.

== Campaign ==
The Centre Party shifted to the right after Ludwig Kaas became its leader.

The Nazi Party had increased their share of the vote in state elections since the 1928 federal election. In spring 1930, Adolf Hitler appointed Joseph Goebbels head of the party's Propaganda Division, and he oversaw the party's Reichstag campaign. Nazi Party membership rose from 108,717 in 1928 to 293,000 by September 1930. Another 100,000 people joined the party between the election and end of the year. The party had forty-nine newspapers, six of which were daily.

The SPD designated the "bourgeois block" of centrist parties and the Nazis as their enemies and, with the KPD, held rallies in Berlin on 1 August 1930 under the motto "Never again war". Some 30,000 people participated in the SPD rally in the Lustgarten and 15,000 in the KPD demonstration at the Winterfeldtplatz. On 23 August, KPD members attacked a Nazi event in Bunzlau. Three people were killed and two seriously injured in fighting with the police. The KPD election campaign climaxed with a rally in the Berlin Sportpalast on 12 September.

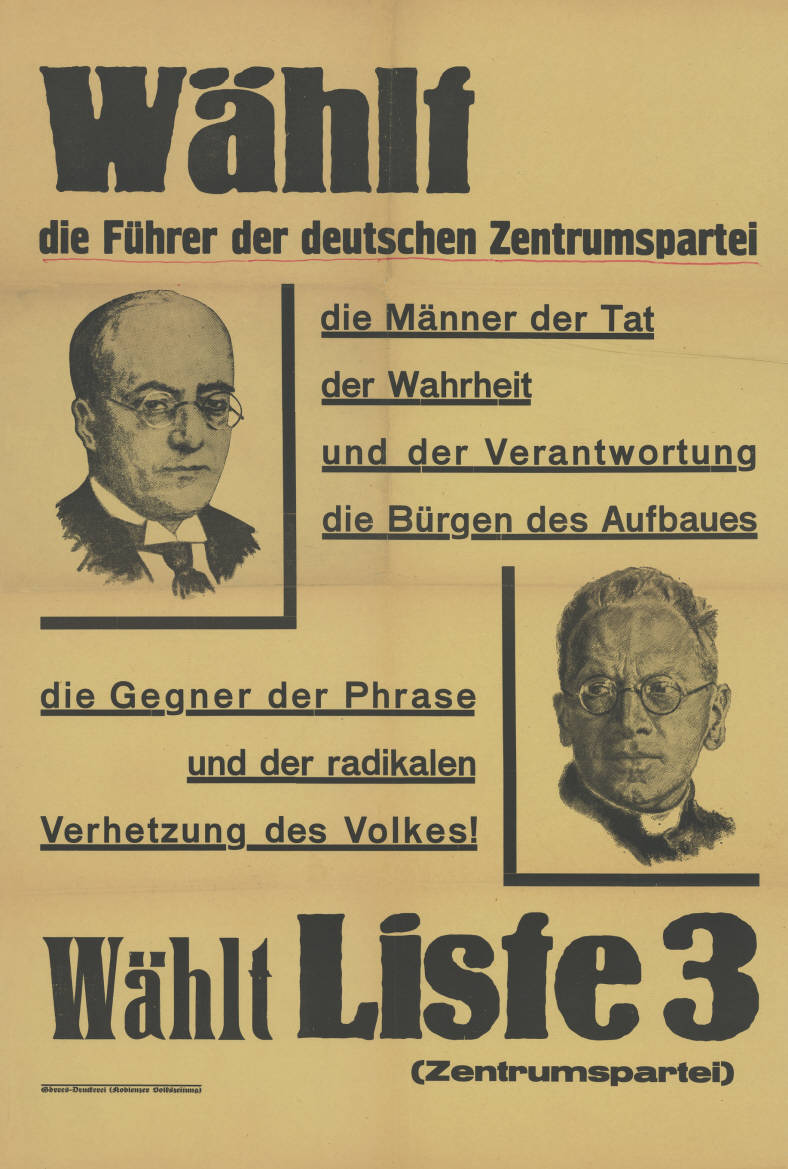
Election poster of the Centre Party The text reads: "Elect the leaders of the German Centre Party, the men of action, of truth and responsibility; the guarantors of reconstruction, the opponents of slogans and of the radical incitement of the people! Elect List 3."

== Results ==
The election had a voter turnout of 82%, the highest since the 1919 election. The Nazis increased their number of seats from 12 to 107. The Social Democrats (SPD) remained the strongest party with 143 seats, a loss of 10 seats from the 1928 election. The only other major party to significantly increase its seats was the Communist Party, which won 13% of the vote, securing 77 seats, 23 more than in the previous election. The Centre Party increased their seat count by seven to 68 but dropped to fourth from third place in both seat count and popular vote when compared with the 1928 election.

The German National People's Party's (DNVP) support plummeted. They lost 32 of their previous 73 seats and dropped to fifth from second, chiefly due to the fragmentation of the party under Alfred Hugenberg's leadership. Due to his more hardline positions, moderate voters moved to the newly formed Christian Social People's Service (CSVD), Conservative People's Party (KVP), and Christian-National Peasants' and Farmers' Party (CNBL). The DNVP received 13% of the vote in rural areas, twice as much as it received in urban areas.

The German People's Party (DVP) continued to haemorrhage seats, losing 15 and only attaining 4.5% of the popular vote. They ceased to be a notable political force after the July 1932 elections. The 28 other political parties shared the remainder of the votes.

In his book Political Man: The Social Bases of Politics, Seymour Martin Lipset argued that the majority of NSDAP's new voters came from "liberal bourgeois center parties", which, with the exception of the Catholic Centre Party, lost almost 80% of their popular support. This was substantiated by other political scientists such as Rudolf Heberle, who noted that "the conservatives were weakest where the Nazis were strongest and the Nazis were relatively weak where the conservatives were strong", as well as Günther Franz, who wrote that "the majority of the National Socialist voters came from the bourgeois center parties." This analysis was challenged by Karl O'Lessker, who instead claimed that the NSDAP's surge in support between the 1928 election and the 1930 election was due to attracting former non-voters and appealing to conservatives who previously voted for the German National People's Party. O'Lessker's counter-argument was widely debated and criticized by scholars such as Allan Schnaiberg, who argued that O'Lessker's interpretation of statistical data carried "major errors" and was of "questionable validity". According to Abraham H. Miller & James S. Robbins, while "even after the criticism of his analysis, O'Lessker refused to concede that it was anything other than defecting Nationalists and previous non-voters who transformed the Nazis into Germany's second largest party", his "analysis did not carry the day, and Lipset's interpretation remains the one most widely accepted". The German National Association of Commercial Employees reported that half of its members voted for the Nazis.

184 of the seats in the Reichstag were held by parties that refused to participate in any coalition government.

Party	Votes	%	+/–	Seats	+/–
Social Democratic Party	8,575,244	24.53	−5.23	143	−10
Nazi Party	6,379,672	18.25	+15.62	107	+95
Communist Party of Germany	4,590,160	13.13	+2.51	77	+23
Centre Party	4,127,000	11.81	−0.26	68	+7
German National People's Party	2,457,686	7.03	−7.22	41	−32
German People's Party	1,577,365	4.51	−4.20	30	−15
Reich Party of the German Middle Class	1,361,762	3.90	−0.61	23	0
German State Party	1,322,034	3.78	−1.03	20	−5
Christian-National Peasants' and Farmers' Party	1,108,043	3.17	+1.31	19	+10
Bavarian People's Party	1,058,637	3.03	−0.04	19	+2
Christian Social People's Service	868,269	2.48	New	14	New
German Farmers' Party	339,434	0.97	−0.59	6	−2
Conservative People's Party	290,579	0.83	New	4	New
Reich Party for Civil Rights and Deflation–Christian Social Reich Party	271,291	0.78	−0.88	0	−2
Agricultural League	193,926	0.55	−0.10	3	0
German-Hanoverian Party	144,286	0.41	−0.23	3	−1
Christian Social Peoples Community	81,550	0.23	New	0	New
Polish People's Party	72,913	0.21	0.00	0	0
Schmalix Greater German List	26,707	0.08	New	0	New
German House and Property Owners' Party	25,530	0.07	−0.05	0	0
Conservative People's Party–German-Hanoverian Party	22,218	0.06	New	0	New
Independent Social Democratic Party	11,690	0.03	−0.04	0	0
Free Association of Craftsmen, Retailers, and Tradesmen	9,531	0.03	New	0	New
Radical German State Party	8,841	0.03	New	0	New
German Unity Party for the True National Economy	6,915	0.02	New	0	New
Disabled Veterans and Survivors of the German Side, Including the Found	6,704	0.02	New	0	New
German Cultural Party of Intellectual Professions, Employees and Officials	6,181	0.02	New	0	New
Tradesmen, Craftsmen, Home Owners	3,644	0.01	New	0	New
Schleswig Club	1,785	0.01	0.00	0	0
Humanity Party and the New Community	1,626	0.00	New	0	New
Evangelical voters	1,326	0.00	New	0	New
Party Against Alcohol	1,171	0.00	New	0	New
Workers Party for Creative Workers	907	0.00	New	0	New
Prussian-Lithunanian People's Party	666	0.00	New	0	New
Renter and People's Reich Party	653	0.00	New	0	New
People's Party of the Lusatian Sorbs	288	0.00	New	0	New
Friesland	237	0.00	0.00	0	0
Total	34,956,471	100.00	–	577	+86
Valid votes	34,956,471	99.24			
Invalid/blank votes	268,028	0.76			
Total votes	35,224,499	100.00			
Registered voters/turnout	42,982,912	81.95			
Source: Gonschior.de

== Aftermath ==
The 1930 election left the Social Democrats and KPD with almost 40 percent of the seats in the Reichstag between them. In November 1931, the SPD suggested that the two parties work together, but KPD leader Ernst Thälmann rejected the offer, with the KPD newspaper Die Rote Fahne calling for an “intensification of the fight against Social Democracy”. Addressing the Nazi electoral breakthrough in the 1930 elections, Thälmann insisted that if Hitler came to power he was sure to fail and drive Nazi voters into the arms of the KPD. As late as February 1932, Thälmann was arguing that “Hitler must come to power first, then the requirements for a revolutionary crisis [will] arrive more quickly”.

The German newspaper General-Anzeiger (and other papers) reported on a dispute in 1930 between the Nazi Party and the German National People's Party (DNVP), their representatives being Wilhelm Frick and Oskar Hergt respectively, concerning the seating arrangement in the Reichstag after the election:

Who is furthest to the right? Berlin, September 23. In the Reichstag on Tuesday afternoon, President Löbe gathered representatives of the various parties to discuss the question of seating, which had become difficult due to the increase in the number of seats. At the end of the meeting, a dispute arose between the representatives of the German Nationals and the National Socialists over which of the two parties was the more explicitly right-wing party. Representative Hergt once again asserted his party's claim to the seat on the far-right wing of the House. Representative Dr. Frick protested against this demand. He believed that this question had been settled once and for all, namely in the sense that the National Socialists were the most right-wing party. The claim of the National Socialists was provisionally recognized in today's discussion, however subject to any agreement between the two parties or any other decision by the Council of Elders after the Reichstag has convened.

As a result of the election, Brüning was not able to form a majority in the Reichstag and continued to rule by decree, implementing harsh austerity measures that brought little economic improvement and were extremely unpopular. Governance by decree became the new norm and paved the way for authoritarian forms of government. Following the 1932 presidential election, the newly re-elected Hindenburg refused to sign any more decrees, and Brüning resigned. A new cabinet was formed under the leadership of Franz von Papen (derisively labelled the "cabinet of barons"), but he was unable to form a majority in the Reichstag, receiving support only from the German National People's Party (DNVP) and the German People's Party (DVP); after a few months of ineffectual leadership, Hindenburg called a snap election.

== Reactions ==
The success of the Nazi Party in the election lead to a number of differing reactions.

On 31 December 1930, the German newspaper Annaburger Zeitung reprinted a story from Völkischer Beobachter concerning a poll about possible involvement of the Nazi Party in government:

The Participation of the National Socialists in the Government. What the Völkische Beobachter says about it: Since the new elections to the Reichstag, the question of a reorganization of the Reich government continues to be vigorously discussed in public. The main issue is whether the National Socialists should enter the Reich government on the basis of their great electoral success or not. Left-leaning circles have repeatedly spoken out against the participation of the National Socialists in government affairs, while the parties to the right of the Center Party are actively advocating for the involvement of the National Socialists in the government. A right-wing Berlin newspaper recently conducted a survey among right-wing economists and politicians on the expediency of National Socialist participation in the Reich government. This survey came to the overwhelming conclusion that the National Socialists should be given the opportunity to assume responsibility in the Reich government. Among others, former Reichsbank President Dr. Schacht and the People's Party Reichstag deputy Colonel General von Seekt spoke in favor of this.

On the same day, the Annaburger Zeitung reported on French reactions to the 1930 German federal election:

Germany and France. It will not be so easily forgotten in Germany that, unlike America and England, France responded to the election result of September 14th with a comprehensive withdrawal of the credit invested in our economy. Twice, then, Paris had used this credit policy weapon for a purely power-political purpose: in 1929, to force Germany to accept the Entente demands at the Young Conference in Paris. And a few weeks ago, this weapon was used again to prevent what France considered an imminent shift in German politics to the right. Thus, one finds in a right-wing Parisian newspaper the view that only the fear of a "new credit freeze"—the concession inherent in it is, incidentally, quite valuable!—is preventing Germany from "throwing itself into the arms of Hitler's people" already; for Germany and its government are undoubtedly moving further and further to the right.

== Works cited ==
- Childers, Thomas (1983). The Nazi Voter: The Social Foundations of Fascism in Germany, 1919–1933. University of North Carolina Press. ISBN 0807815705.
- Nohlen, Dieter; Stöver, Philip (2010). Elections in Europe: a data handbook (1. ed.). Baden-Baden: Nomos Verl.-Ges. ISBN 9783832956097.
- Pollock, James (1930). "The German Reichstag Elections of 1930". American Political Science Review. 24 (4). American Political Science Association: 989–995. doi:10.2307/1946755. JSTOR 1946755.
