= Johann Viktor Bredt =

German jurist and politician (1879–1940)

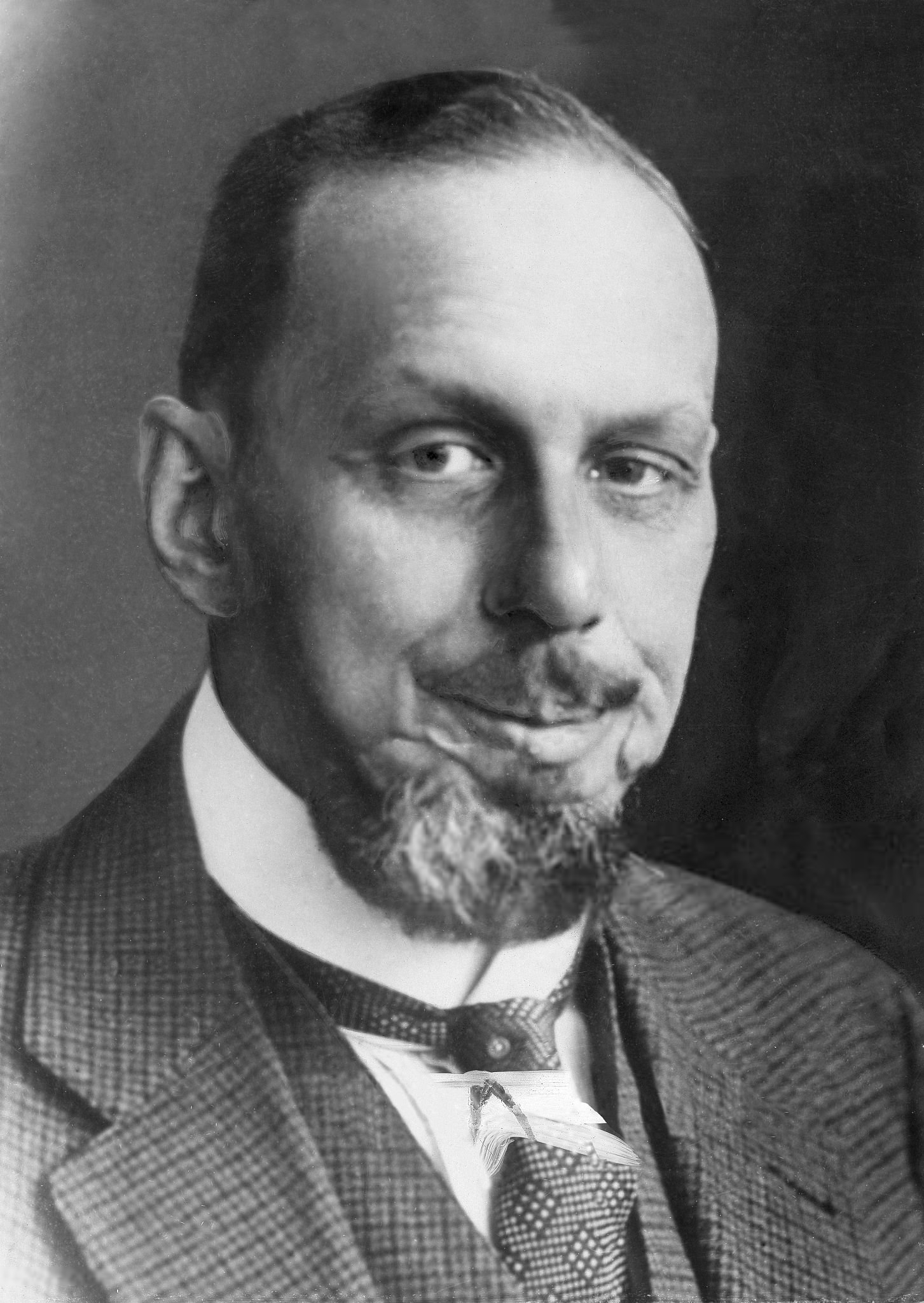
- Bredt in 1930

Reich Minister of Justice
- In office 30 March 1930 – 5 December 1930
- Chancellor: Heinrich Brüning
- Preceded by: Theodor von Guérard
- Succeeded by: Curt Joël (acting)

Member of the Reichstag
- In office 27 May 1924 – 4 June 1932
- Constituency: National list (1924–1928); Düsseldorf-Ost (1928–1932)

Personal details
- Born: 2 March 1879 Barmen, Germany
- Died: 1 December 1940 (aged 61) Marburg, Germany
- Party: Economic Party, 1920-1933; DNVP, 1918-1920; FKP, 1911-1918

Johann Viktor Bredt (2 March 1879 – 1 December 1940) was a German jurist and politician, who served as Minister of Justice of the Weimar Republic in 1930.

== Biography ==
Bredt was born in Barmen, on 2 March 1879, the only son of Viktor Richard Bredt (1849–1881), an industrialist, and his wife, Henriette (née Koll). He worked at the Barmer Bankverein in 1897/8 before studying jurisprudence and economics at Tübingen, Göttingen and Bonn. In 1901, he was awarded a doctorate (Dr. jur.) and in 1904 a Dr. phil. In 1909, he became a professor at Marburg. Bredt worked in the civil service in 1903-09 and in 1910 was appointed to a professorship for jurisprudence at Marburg university.

From 1911 to 1918, Bredt was a member of the lower chamber of the Landtag of Prussia, first for the Free Conservative Party in the Kingdom of Prussia, in this role he joined a more moderate faction of the party which called for the abolition of the Prussian three class voting system.

After the fall of the German Empire and the rise of the Weimar Republic he played a role in the founding of the DNVP, but his opposition to the Kapp Putsch led him to resign from the party in 1920. He then helped found the Economic Party, which would serve as his new political home. He was elected to the Prussian Landtag in 1920 and served there until 1924. Then from 1924 to 1932, he was the parliamentary leader of the party in the Reichstag. In 1926, Bredt was an expert witness for the parliamentary committee on the causes of the German collapse in 1918. In 1930 and 1931, he served as Minister of Justice in the first cabinet of Heinrich Brüning but his parties opposition to his support of Brüning's economic policy lead him reluctantly resigning his position. Bredt also played a key role in the German reformed church. In 1925, he was awarded an honorary doctorate in theology Dr. theol. h. c. by the University of Bonn. After the Economic Parties collapse following the start of Great Depression he briefly served as the parties leader in 1931, and served as its lone representative in Reichstag following the November 1932 elections.

Aside from politics Bredt was also a writer on religious topics. From 1921 to 1927 he published the three volume New Protestant Church Law for Prussia which gained significance as one of the first comprehensive compilations of church law after the end of the Princes' leadership of the Lutheran Church.

After the rise of the Nazis, despite his opposition to Nazism Bredt was not persecuted and was allowed to take up a teaching position in Marburg. Bredt died 1 December 1940, aged 61, in Marburg.

Johann married twice: in 1902 Ada Bredt (divorced in 1912) at Barmen and in 1931 Olga Bredt (at Marburg).

== Works ==
- Die Trennung von Kirche und Staat, 1919
- Die Rechte des Summus Episcopus, 1919
- Neues evangelisches Kirchenrecht für Preußen, 3 volumes, 1921–27
- Der Geist der deutschen Reichsverfassung, 1924
- Der deutsche Reichstag im Weltkrieg, 1926
- Die belgische Neutralität und der Schlieffensche Feldzugsplan, 1929
- Geschichte der Familie Bredt, 1937
- Haus Bredt-Rübel, 1937
- Die Verfassung der reformierten Kirche in Cleve-Jülich-Berg-Mark, 1938.
