= 1932 German presidential election =

- 13 March 1932 (first round); 10 April 1932 (second round)
- Turnout: 86.21% (first round); 83.45% (second round)
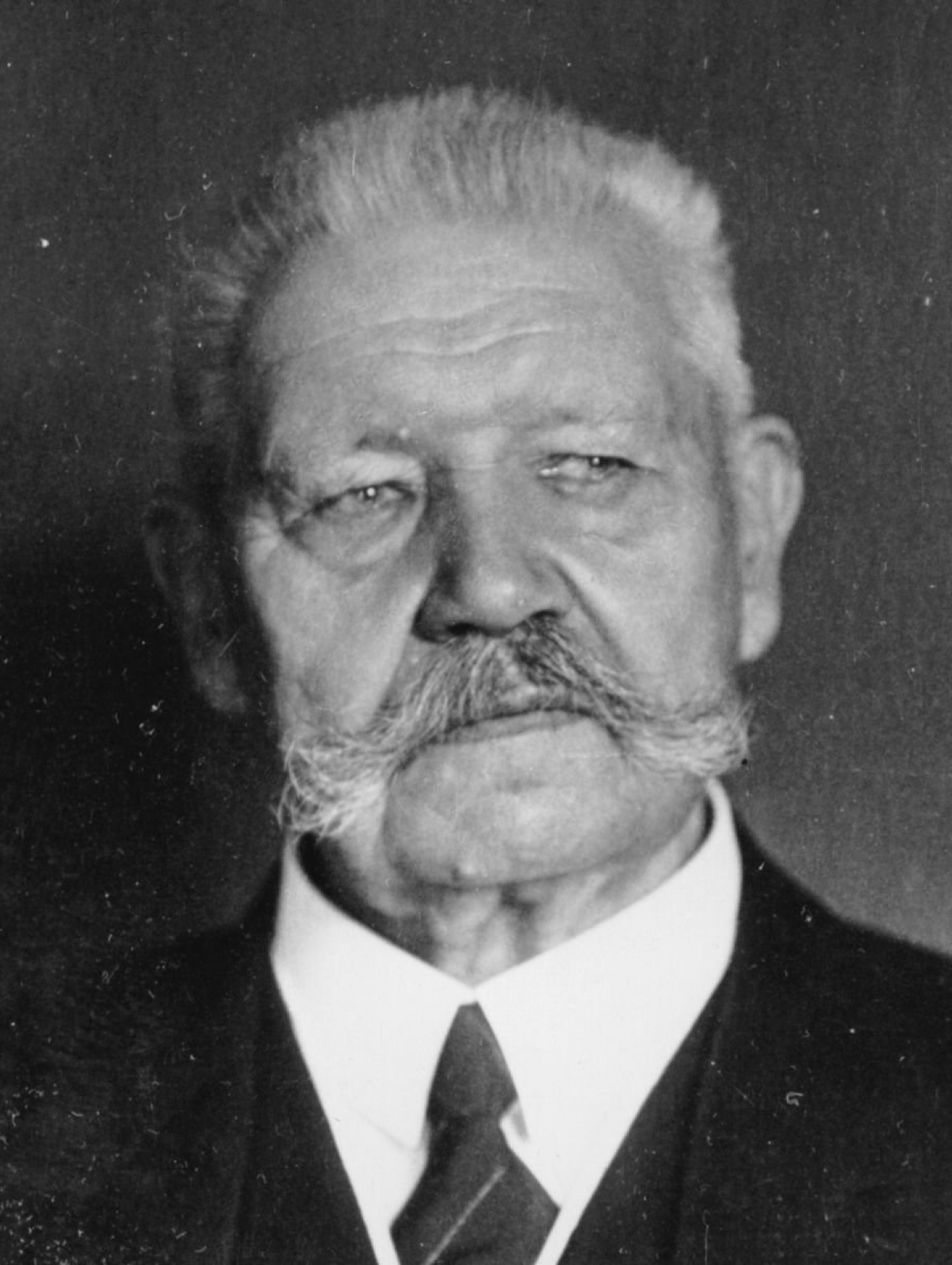

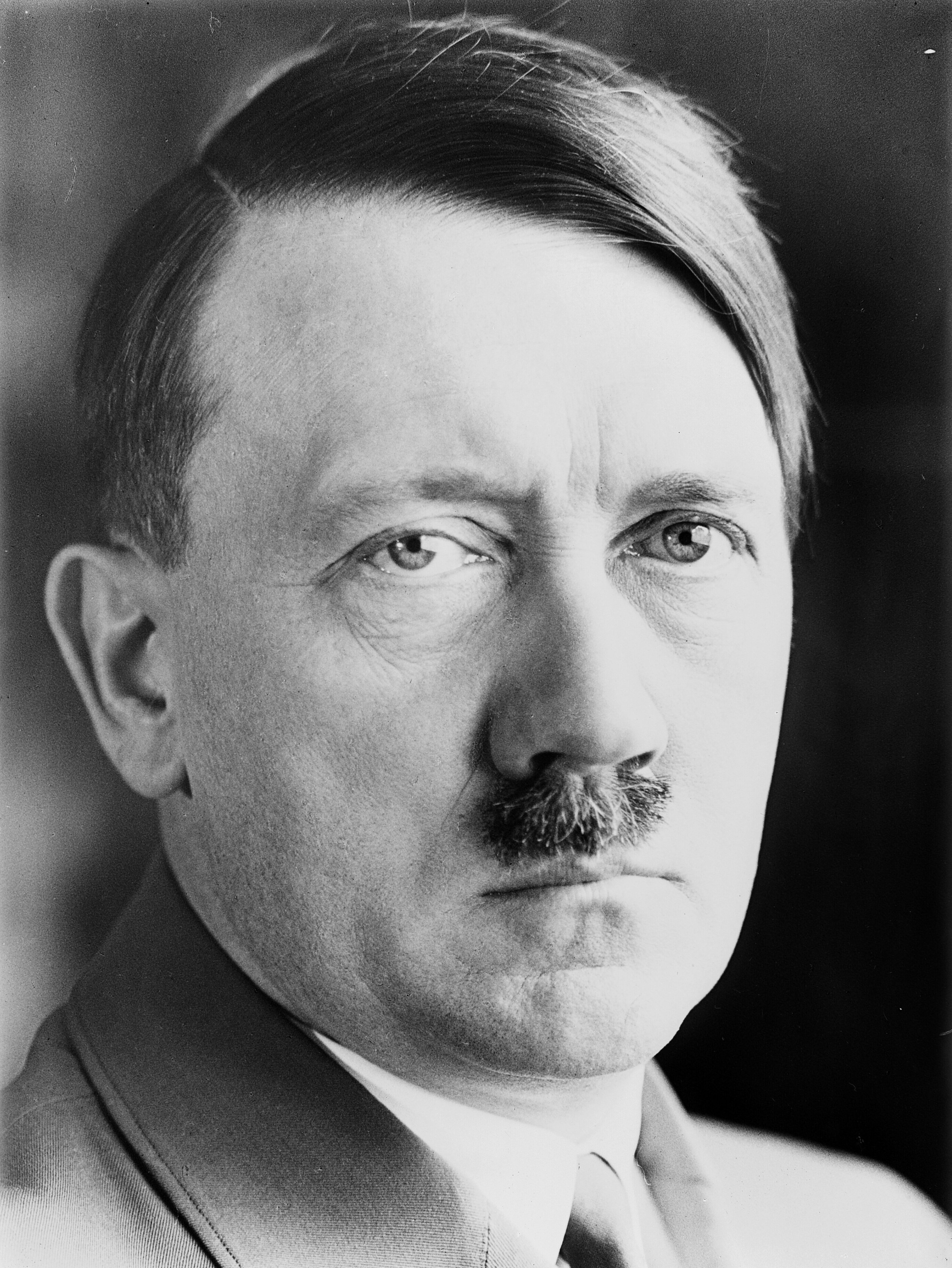

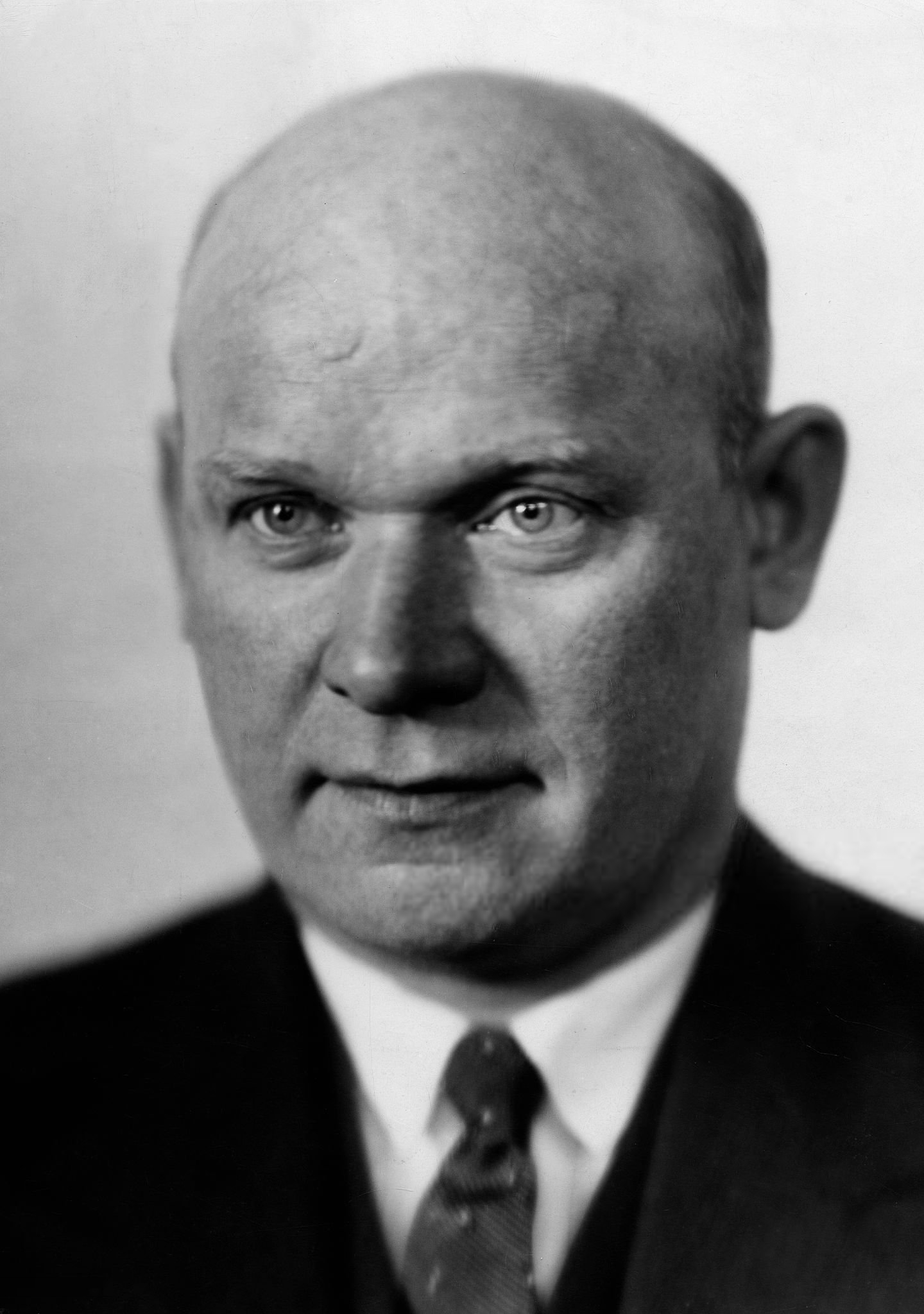
Candidate	Paul von Hindenburg	Adolf Hitler	Ernst Thälmann
Party	Independent; Supported by: List: SPD; Centre; DVP; WP; DStP; CNBL; BVP; CSVD; DBP; VNR/Jungdo; KVP; DHP; BB	NSDAP; Supported by: List: RLB	KPD
Popular vote	19,359,983	13,418,517	3,706,759
Percentage	53.05%	36.77%	10.16%
President before election
Paul von Hindenburg
Independent
Elected President
Paul von Hindenburg
Independent

Presidential elections were held in Germany on 13 March 1932, with a runoff on 10 April. Independent incumbent Paul von Hindenburg won a second seven-year term against Adolf Hitler of the Nazi Party (NSDAP). Communist Party (KPD) leader Ernst Thälmann also ran and received more than ten percent of the vote in the runoff. Theodor Duesterberg, the deputy leader of the World War I veterans' organization Der Stahlhelm, ran in the first round but dropped out of the runoff. This was the second and final direct election to the office of President of the Reich (Reichspräsident), Germany's head of state under the Weimar Republic.

Under the Weimar Republic, which had arisen from Germany's defeat in World War I, the presidency was a powerful office. Although the Weimar Constitution had provided for a semi-presidential republic, structural weaknesses and political polarization had resulted in a paralyzed Reichstag. Combined with the Great Depression, this resulted in a government that had governed exclusively via presidential decrees since March 1930, giving the President much power. Hindenburg had been elected to the office in 1925 with the support of a coalition of several parties on the right who hoped that he would overturn the Weimar Republic, which was never particularly popular.

The Nazi Party had risen very rapidly, from being a fringe group for much of the 1920s to becoming the second-largest party in the Reichstag in 1930. Led by Hitler, who exercised sole control over its policy and direction, its ideology combined extreme hostility towards the Weimar Republic with fervent antisemitism, anti-communism and German nationalism. The threat of Hitler caused many on the left to support Hindenburg; at the same time, Hindenburg's failure to overturn the Weimar Republic had disappointed many of those on the right who had supported him in 1925. The combined effect of these two influences resulted in a drastic change of Hindenburg's voter base between the two elections. In 1925 he had been elected as the right-wing candidate, while in 1932 much of his support came from the centre and left. Some on the left were still lukewarm towards Hindenburg; the Communists exploited this by running Thälmann and promoting him as "the only left candidate". Hindenburg failed to receive the requisite majority of votes in the first round, but was able to win reelection in the runoff.

Hindenburg's reelection failed to prevent the NSDAP from assuming power. Two successive federal elections later that year left it as the largest party in the Reichstag, and anti-republic parties in general holding the majority of seats. Under this political climate, Hindenburg appointed Hitler as Chancellor of Germany in January 1933. Upon Hindenburg's death in 1934 Hitler de facto assumed the presidency, which he combined with the chancellorship to become the Führer und Reichskanzler. Therefore, the 1932 election was the last presidential election in Germany until 1949 (by which point the country was divided into West Germany and East Germany). It remains, until today, the last direct election of the German President. All presidential elections after World War II have been indirect. Hindenburg remained the only independent politician elected president of Germany until the election of Joachim Gauck nearly 80 years later.

== Background ==
An NSDAP rally in Nuremberg c. 1928. Hitler is top left.

World War I had resulted in the collapse of all monarchies in Germany. In place of the German Empire arose the Weimar Republic, named for the city in which its constitution had been drafted. It was never particularly popular among the various groups that constituted its political landscape, receiving lukewarm support even from those who supported democracy and being hated by extremists. According to the Weimar Constitution, the president was to be elected for a seven-year term by the people, though the first President, Friedrich Ebert, was elected by the Weimar National Assembly in 1919, as the situation in Germany was too chaotic to hold popular elections. Ebert died suddenly in 1925, necessitating an election to be held that year, a year earlier than scheduled.

Paul von Hindenburg, the commander of the German military during the war, had won the 1925 election despite not running in its first round. He had defeated Wilhelm Marx, the candidate backed by the parties of the pro-republic "Weimar Coalition". After 1929, the Great Depression devastated the Republic as parties argued over the proper response to it; the "Grand Coalition" government of Hermann Müller, which had been in power since the 1928 elections, dissolved in the face of the crisis and Müller resigned on 27 March 1930. Heinrich Brüning, who was appointed Chancellor in his place, had no majority for his austerity policies in the Reichstag and began to use the Presidential powers to rule by decree. This was received positively by many conservatives who disliked democratic government and supported Hindenburg's reelection to further this conservative renaissance. At the same time, Hindenburg's work within the Republic had been much better than had been expected by pro-republican politicians.

The Nazi Party (NSDAP), originally called German Workers' Party (DAP), was founded in 1919. World War I corporal Adolf Hitler joined it later that year and became first its primary speaker and, in 1921, party leader with dictatorial powers. Hitler's preeminent position and infallibility within the party was confirmed in 1926 at a conference where the party manifesto was ruled immutable. The party's ideology was a mixture of pan-Germanism, antisemitism, disgust with parliamentary parties, and resentment towards big business. A fringe group for most of the 1920s, the NSDAP was brought to public attention on the German right-wing by a referendum against the Young Plan in 1929, when it had been associated with and aided by Alfred Hugenberg's mainstream conservative German National People's Party (DNVP), dramatically increasing its number of seats in the Reichstag in the 1930 federal election. The DNVP and NSDAP made a formal alliance known as the Harzburg Front in 1930.

Nazi membership rose from 293,000 in September 1930, to almost 1.5 million by the end of 1932. The amount of papers controlled by the party rose from 49 in 1930, to 127 by 1932. Völkischer Beobachter's circulation rose from 26,000 in 1929, to over 100,000 in 1931. In prior elections the Nazis relied on membership dues, but started receiving financial support from businesses in 1932.

== Electoral system ==
During the Weimar Republic the law provided for a modified two-round system, such that if no candidate received an absolute majority of votes (i.e. more than half) in the first round of a presidential election then a second ballot would occur in which the candidate with a plurality of votes would be deemed elected. It was permitted for a group to nominate a different candidate in the second round from the one they had in the first round. This occurred in 1925 but not in 1932.

== Candidates ==
=== Hindenburg ===
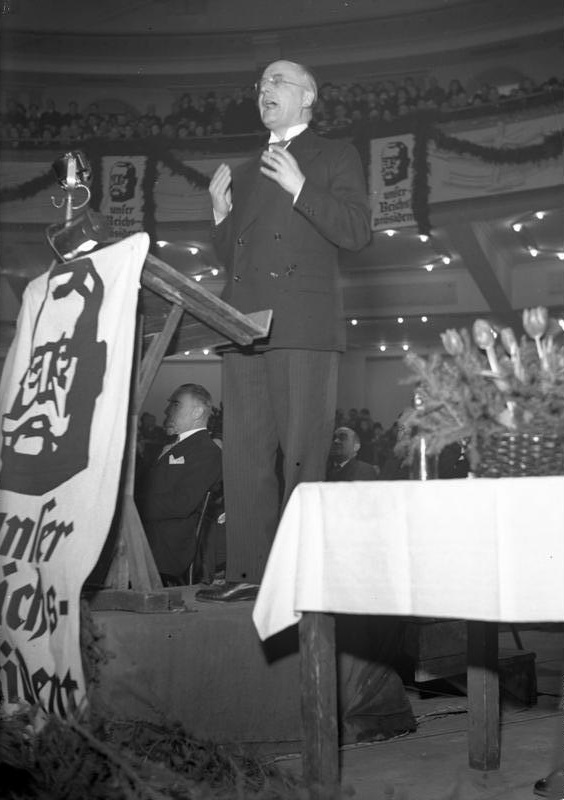
Brüning campaigning for Hindenburg in March

Hindenburg was 84 and had no desire to run for a second term, but he expressed interest in continuing office if his term was extended. Brüning developed plans to evade direct elections by a Reichstag resolution to extend Hindenburg's time in office by amending the constitutional provisions requiring elections once every seven years. Hugenberg refused such proposals during the first week of January and insisted that an election be held per the constitution, a position that Hitler would also assume. Hitler was initially open to extending Hindenburg's term, but on the condition that Hindenburg dismissed Brüning, but he refused to.

After elections were guaranteed, Hindenburg's cadre, led by Major General Kurt von Schleicher, courted the militant right's support of another Hindenburg candidacy. However, Hugenberg persuaded Der Stahlhelm to reject such proposals while the NSDAP supported a possible Hitler candidacy. This lack of support made Hindenburg reluctant to run for reelection, which worried both people who wished to preserve the Republic and those who supported Brüning's style of rule by decree. Heinrich Sahm of Berlin approached Schleicher with the possibility of forming a reelection committee for Hindenburg; Schleicher attempted to postpone Sahm's goal pending talks with the Stahlhelm, but as more Hindenburg committees were set up across the country and the prospect of a Hitler candidacy rose Schleicher and Meissner approved the project on 27 January, and the committee was organized on 1 February. Hindenburg insisted on the support of veterans' organizations; with the begrudging support of the Stahlhelm (Note: The Stahlhelm agreed to support Hindenburg under conditions that Hindenburg rejected; nevertheless, Hindenburg considered such support a sign that the Stahlhelm would be persuaded to support him unconditionally.) and the unconditional support of the Kyffhäuser League, and the fact that Sahm's committee had obtained more than 3 million signatures for Hindenburg in two weeks, gave Hindenburg enough motivation to run for reelection, declaring his candidacy on 16 February. Among those who signed the petition were the writer Gerhart Hauptmann, painter Max Liebermann, Artur Mahraun, leader of the Young German Order, the industrialist Carl Duisberg, as well as the former ministers Otto Gessler and Gustav Noske.

=== Hitler ===
Hitler was hesitant to run given Hindenburg's popularity and the fact that the NSDAP was still not the biggest party in the Reichstag. Furthermore, he was not technically allowed to run as he lacked German citizenship, which was rectified upon his appointment to a post in the civil service of Braunschweig on 26 February. However, the Nazis were rapidly growing in popularity throughout late 1931, and Hitler was able to persuade industrialists that Nazism was compatible with capitalism. Hitler considered running Franz Ritter von Epp or Wilhelm Frick for the presidency. The Nazi candidate was meant to be announced on 3 February at a meeting of the Gauleiters, but the party was still undecided. Joseph Goebbels supported a Hitler candidacy while Gregor Strasser felt it would be dangerous as he could not defeat Hindenburg.

The Harzburg Front was starting to show disunity regarding the election, with the DNVP agreeing to support the Stahlhelm's choice of candidate in exchange for support in state elections. Hugenberg attempted to keep Hitler in line with the Harzburg Front at a meeting on 20 February, but to no avail; at a party rally on 22 February NSDAP member Goebbels revealed that Hitler would run in the race. The Stahlhelm's choice – Theodor Duesterberg – was announced later that day, overshadowed by Hitler's candidacy.

== First round campaign ==
Although Hindenburg preferred to have either been the right-wing or an apolitical candidate, he attracted the support of Republican parties in order to defeat Hitler. The liberal parties – German People's Party and German State Party – declared their support for Hindenburg. The Social Democratic leaders Ernst Heilmann and Otto Braun (himself a candidate in the 1925 election), despite the initial resistance of the party's left wing, were able to launch a broad electoral campaign and received the support of the Iron Front alliance, including the democratic Reichsbanner Schwarz-Rot-Gold association, the Free Trade Unions (ADGB, AfA-Bund) and the Arbeiter-Turn- und Sportbund organization. The Social Democrats and Brüning's Centre Party would support Hindenburg – in contrast to the 1925 presidential election, when Hindenburg had been the candidate of the political right and had been strenuously opposed by much of the moderate left and political centre. In 1932 this part of the political spectrum decided to unite with the moderate right in supporting Hindenburg to prevent Hitler's election. The support of the moderate Weimar Coalition was also encouraged by the fact that, contrary to fears expressed at the time of his election in 1925, Hindenburg had not used his office to subvert the constitution, as Hitler now aimed to do. This put Hindenburg's conservative supporters in a difficult position, as their desire for a return to conservatism was at odds with Hindenburg's newfound pro-democracy supporters; indeed, Hindenburg's failure to completely break from the Weimar system would prove a damper on those who had supported him in 1925. Among those who had voted for Hindenburg in 1925 and refused to sign his petition were banker Walter Bernhard, Leipzig mayor Carl Goerdeler, and general August von Mackensen.

Duesterberg's candidacy attracted the votes of industrialists who would have otherwise voted Hindenburg for fear of Hitler. On 1 March the National Rural League (RLB), despite the best efforts of Hindenburg's campaigners, encouraged its followers to vote either Duesterberg or Hitler in order to remove the government of Brüning.

== Results ==
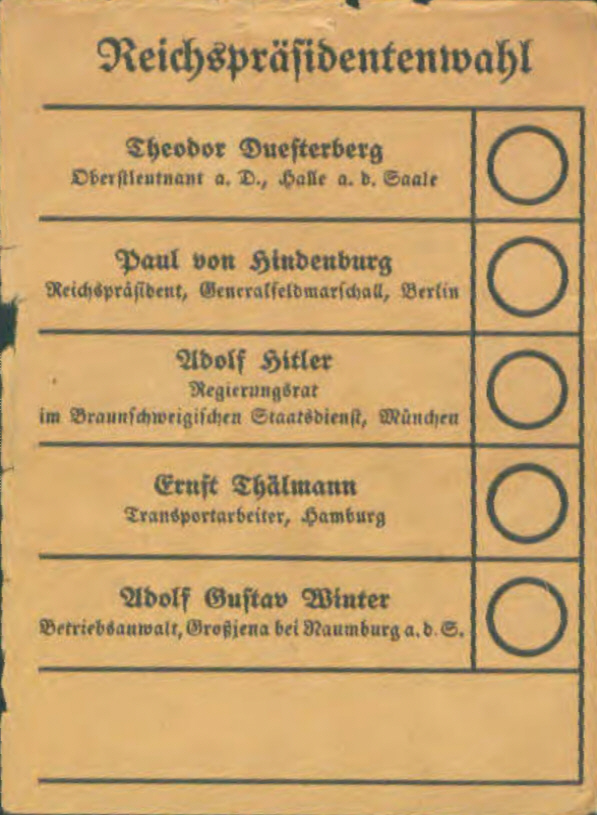
Election ballot

In the first round on March 13 no candidate obtained an absolute majority of the votes cast, though Hindenburg with 49.6% failed only by a narrow margin. He scored higher election results in traditional Social Democratic and Centre strongholds such as the Prussian Rhine Province or Saxony. Hitler's results were a great disappointment to him, nevertheless the NSDAP recorded further gains compared with the 1930 Reichstag election. Hindenburg's failure to win reelection in the first round shocked and disappointed his supporters.

Hitler outperformed Hindenburg in several of his 1925 strongholds, getting up to an estimated 50 percent of the vote of 1925 Hindenburg voters in the first round. Taking Duesterberg's votes into account it has been estimated that Hindenburg retained fewer than a third of those who had voted for him in 1925, fewer than 30 percent excluding Bavaria, where the Bavarian People's Party (BVP) had endorsed him in both elections. The expectations of the Communists presenting "the only left candidate" were not fulfilled, nevertheless they continued their fight against the policies of the Social Democrats and nominated Thälmann for the second round on 10 April.

In reporting the outcome The Des Moines Register warned that "If Hitler wins in April the future of the nation and even of Europe to a great extent is uncertain ... [the Nazis'] extremist policies might easily lead to the gravest international complications." The New York Daily News described Hindenburg as "the grandest character of modern Germany" and said that he had completely defeated the communists and the Stahlhelm, predicting an easy reelection. It was hesitant on the matter of Hindenburg's succession, positing that Hitler would inherit Hindenburg's supporters unless the question of reparations was settled. The Chicago Tribune recorded great disappointment in Paris at the results combined with a confidence that Hindenburg would win in the runoff, and described the Nazi platform as "largely negative[,] ... anti-Republican, anti-parliament, anti-Young Plan, anti-Locarno, anti-league of nations, anti-semitic, and anti-capitalist."

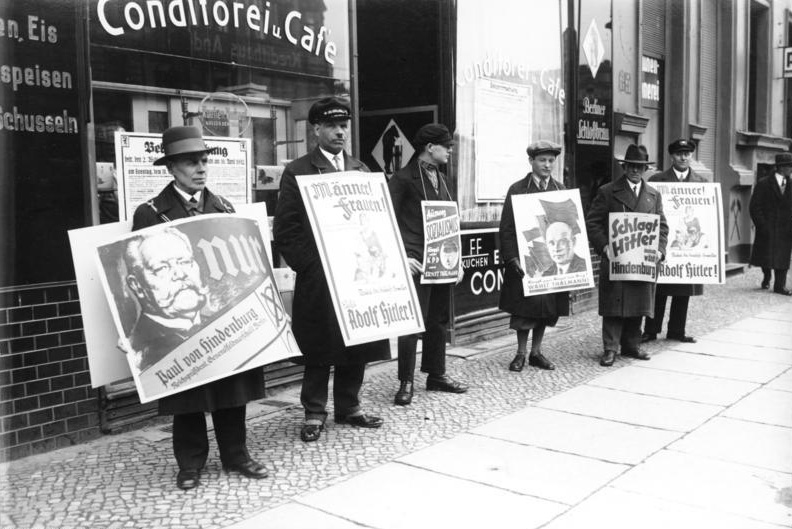
Political advertising in Berlin on 10 April

The narrowness of Hindenburg's failure to obtain reelection in the first round made his reelection almost guaranteed in the runoff. Nobody, especially Hindenburg's supporters, desired a runoff given that elections in several states would be held just two weeks later. Still, a runoff provided another chance for Hindenburg's conservative supporters to promote him, especially as Duesterberg was likely to drop out. A meeting of Stahlhelm's executives on 19–20 March concluded that Duesterberg would not run in the runoff and that the alliance with the DNVP would be rescinded; many of Hindenburg's conservative supporters hoped that Duesterberg voters would mostly swing toward Hindenburg in the runoff. These hopes were increased by the fact that Hugenberg refused to endorse Hitler in the runoff, still sore over the latter's decision to run on his own.

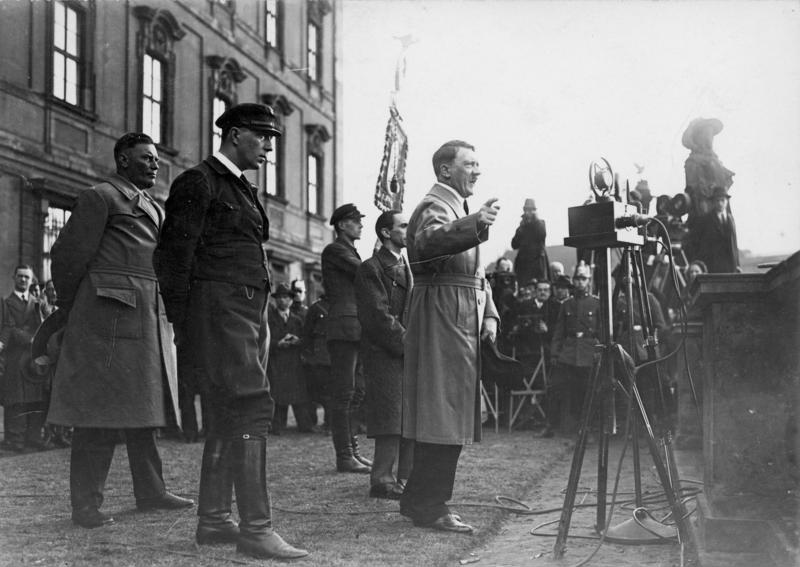
Hitler making a speech on 4 April

Hindenburg, Hitler, and Thälmann competed in the second round, after Duesterberg had dropped out. As in 1925, the Communist Party nominated Ernst Thälmann. Backed by the Communist International, it was hoped that he would gain support from left-wing Social Democrats disgusted by Hindenburg's character. Indeed, leftist splinter parties such as the Socialist Workers' Party of Germany and the Internationaler Sozialistischer Kampfbund organization declared their support, as did intellectuals like Carl von Ossietzky. Hindenburg's conservative supporters had not made any personal attacks against Hitler in the first round, although they criticized the NSDAP and its ideology. In the runoff they portrayed Hitler as a party man whose anti-republican rhetoric disguised the NSDAP's adherence to the system. They also portrayed Hitler and the Nazis as socialists whose rhetoric against Marxism was a disguise towards their own dislike of private property and free enterprise. They contrasted Hindenburg's Christian character with Hitler's apathy towards organized religion. The NSDAP responded to these accusations by noting the reversal of Hindenburg's supporters between the elections, accusing Hindenburg of betraying his 1925 supporters and allying with the Catholics, Marxists, and Jews who had opposed him then and asserting that Hitler was a victim of a scare campaign by those elements. However, the Nazis largely avoided attacking Hindenburg directly owing to his respect and popularity, and instead encouraged people to vote for him if they were satisfied with the unpopular Brüning.

The Nazis pioneered new campaigning tactics, such as direct mailing and transporting Hitler across the country by airplane, allowing him to perform at several rallies in a single day. Furthermore, they would also hire venues that were deliberately too small in order to encourage overcrowding and present the perception of greater popularity for Hitler. The events would last for several hours, with Hitler's actual appearance being delayed (accompanied by continual and misleading announcements on his time to arrival) in order to generate further crowd anticipation.

Industrialists who had supported Duesterberg were not enthusiastic about Hindenburg and did not largely cross over to him in the runoff, contrary to the hopes of his supporters. Brüning was unpopular amongst industrialists such that after meeting Hitler on 19 March Reusch told the Frankischer Kurier to refrain from making any endorsements in the runoff. Duesterberg endorsed Hindenburg in the runoff; nevertheless, the RLB, the Pan-German League, and the United Patriotic Leagues of Germany all endorsed Hitler in order to end the Republic. Their relationships with Hugenberg were all consequently strained, and he asked the DNVP to not play a role in the runoff as he was increasingly isolated within and outside the party. The industrialist Fritz Thyssen declared himself in favour of Hitler.

In the second round, Hindenburg was elected president by an outcome of 53%, while Hitler significantly increased his result by more than two million votes compared to the first round and obtained up to an estimated 60 percent of Hindenburg's 1925 voters, largely benefiting from Duesterberg's withdrawal. About half of those who had voted for Duesterberg in the first round voted for Hitler while less than a third voted for Hindenburg. Less than 15 percent of Hitler's gains came from defectors of Thälmann.

Candidate	Party	First round		Second round	
Candidate	Party	Votes	%	Votes	%
Paul von Hindenburg	Independent	18,651,497	49.54	19,359,983	53.05
Adolf Hitler	Nazi Party	11,339,446	30.12	13,418,547	36.77
Ernst Thälmann	Communist Party	4,983,341	13.24	3,706,759	10.16
Theodor Duesterberg	Der Stahlhelm	2,557,729	6.79		
Gustav Winter	Inflation Victims	111,423	0.30		
Other candidates		4,881	0.01	5,472	0.01
Total		37,648,317	100.00	36,490,761	100.00
Valid votes		37,648,317	99.36	36,490,761	99.24
Invalid/blank votes		242,134	0.64	281,026	0.76
Total votes		37,890,451	100.00	36,771,787	100.00
Registered voters/turnout		43,949,681	86.21	44,063,958	83.45
Source: Gonschior

=== Results by constituency ===
Constituency	First round								Second round					
Constituency	Hindenburg Ind.		Hitler NSDAP		Thälmann KPD		Duesterberg Stahlhelm		Hindenburg Ind.		Hitler NSDAP		Thälmann KPD	
Constituency	Votes	%	Votes	%	Votes	%	Votes	%	Votes	%	Votes	%	Votes	%
1 East Prussia	509,883	43.76	402,300	34.52	116,451	9.99	133,879	11.49	546,624	48.58	493,203	43.83	84,951	7.55
2 Berlin	559,329	43.92	247,387	19.42	371,410	29.16	90,831	7.13	565,523	46.65	331,845	27.37	314,936	25.98
3 Potsdam II	566,070	46.48	326,477	26.81	205,442	16.87	116,885	9.60	581,201	49.91	415,196	35.65	168,123	14.44
4 Potsdam I	505,470	40.56	375,479	30.13	229,503	18.42	132,583	10.64	535,033	44.53	483,597	40.25	182,851	15.22
5 Frankfurt (Oder)	409,484	42.88	338,049	35.40	81,523	8.54	123,219	12.90	443,367	48.04	421,882	45.71	57,411	6.22
6 Pomerania	361,223	34.44	391,815	37.35	94,570	9.02	198,371	18.91	395,667	40.74	510,586	52.58	64,567	6.65
7 Breslau	541,871	48.12	403,281	35.82	96,862	8.60	81,702	7.26	568,454	51.73	461,368	41.98	68,988	6.28
8 Liegnitz	338,024	46.62	275,062	37.94	46,744	6.45	62,910	8.68	359,366	50.82	313,725	44.37	33,936	4.80
9 Oppeln	369,831	51.78	185,301	25.94	102,706	14.38	54,656	7.65	402,983	57.90	213,841	30.72	79,102	11.36
10 Magdeburg	471,107	45.70	350,958	34.04	107,435	10.42	99,050	9.61	491,429	49.84	413,356	41.92	81,177	8.23
11 Merseburg	286,780	33.05	273,410	31.51	201,514	23.22	103,626	11.94	304,645	37.06	352,054	42.83	165,217	20.10
12 Thuringia	497,824	36.43	450,529	32.97	246,561	18.04	168,308	12.32	555,323	42.19	582,820	44.28	177,769	13.51
13 Schleswig-Holstein	393,845	40.23	417,711	42.66	100,327	10.25	61,870	6.32	416,293	43.59	465,950	48.78	72,633	7.60
14 Weser-Ems	463,070	52.28	269,046	30.38	69,844	7.89	81,190	9.17	482,907	56.38	322,954	37.71	50,431	5.89
15 East Hanover	252,232	40.51	240,531	38.63	49,333	7.92	77,765	12.49	271,292	45.50	289,124	48.49	35,651	5.98
16 South Hanover–Braunschweig	602,225	48.84	468,638	38.01	87,868	7.13	71,581	5.81	611,206	50.17	545,782	44.80	61,020	5.01
17 Westphalia North	869,071	60.36	318,775	22.14	173,921	12.08	74,830	5.20	883,176	63.87	376,336	27.22	122,947	8.89
18 Westphalia South	790,678	52.68	363,339	24.21	280,359	18.68	64,053	4.27	823,282	57.64	414,492	29.02	190,405	13.33
19 Hesse-Nassau	737,743	49.81	510,869	34.49	166,745	11.26	63,030	4.26	760,126	52.18	583,894	40.08	112,544	7.73
20 Cologne-Aachen	819,871	65.34	215,982	17.21	182,816	14.57	31,927	2.54	817,617	68.42	244,184	20.44	132,979	11.13
21 Koblenz-Trier	420,510	61.59	155,459	22.77	52,171	7.64	52,799	7.73	441,319	65.36	195,817	29.00	37,897	5.61
22 Düsseldorf East	594,113	45.73	334,550	25.75	319,930	24.63	47,291	3.64	594,407	48.85	388,537	31.93	233,840	19.22
23 Düsseldorf West	564,402	52.56	262,645	24.46	189,646	17.66	54,582	5.08	574,855	57.53	298,983	29.92	125,351	12.54
24 Upper Bavaria–Swabia	978,159	65.17	366,731	24.43	116,139	7.74	31,690	2.11	1,014,385	69.13	365,030	24.88	87,756	5.98
25 Lower Bavaria–Upper Palatinate	472,899	69.91	150,020	22.18	42,798	6.33	8,361	1.24	500,815	72.27	158,289	22.84	33,682	4.86
26 Franconia	811,480	53.30	557,227	36.60	89,218	5.86	61,897	4.07	824,812	54.67	621,110	41.17	62,492	4.14
27 Palatinate	282,578	50.97	196,169	35.38	63,434	11.44	11,300	2.04	287,053	52.32	219,777	40.06	41,687	7.60
28 Dresden–Bautzen	625,859	52.07	342,947	28.53	148,409	12.35	77,410	6.44	640,839	54.02	434,959	36.66	110,496	9.31
29 Leipzig	455,209	51.84	237,724	27.07	144,529	16.46	36,685	4.18	448,892	51.76	296,311	34.16	122,038	14.07
30 Chemnitz–Zwickau	410,335	34.37	487,882	40.87	236,175	19.78	55,653	4.66	445,023	37.71	557,467	47.23	177,646	15.05
31 Württemberg	850,461	58.52	369,725	25.44	145,154	9.99	83,963	5.78	897,912	63.11	416,521	29.28	108,078	7.60
32 Baden	720,430	56.02	385,504	29.98	148,351	11.54	28,539	2.22	737,649	57.37	439,990	34.22	107,987	8.40
33 Hesse-Darmstadt	427,840	51.48	280,170	33.71	104,862	12.62	16,203	1.95	434,965	53.08	314,039	38.32	70,384	8.59
34 Hamburg	446,054	54.61	200,634	24.56	123,879	15.17	37,995	4.65	441,141	56.81	238,753	30.75	96,485	12.43
35 Mecklenburg	245,537	45.24	187,120	34.47	46,712	8.61	61,095	11.26	260,402	49.08	236,775	44.62	33,302	6.28
Total	18,651,497	49.54	11,339,446	30.12	4,983,341	13.24	2,557,729	6.79	19,359,983	53.05	13,418,547	36.77	3,706,759	10.16

== Aftermath ==
Hindenburg, who owed his election to the support of the Social Democrats and the Centre Party, took the results with little enthusiasm. His failure to retain the votes of the vast majority of his 1925 supporters strained his relationship with Brüning irreparably, and he dismissed the chancellor on 30 May. This was a serious blow to those who had supported Brüning's style of presidential rule by decree. Brüning's successor was Franz von Papen, an ally of Schleicher's who had no political experience or support in the Reichstag. Schleicher and Papen courted the support of the Nazis by calling new Reichstag elections and lifting a ban Brüning had placed on the Nazi Sturmabteilung. The NSDAP emerged from the Reichstag elections in July as the largest party ever seen in the Reichstag and having over a third of the vote, while Papen's position was undermined. Papen dissolved the Reichstag again with elections in November, in which the Nazis lost seats but remained the largest party. Although Papen retained the trust of Hindenburg and the army, he was widely unpopular and a strike by the Communists and Nazis enabled Schleicher, who had tired of him, to drum up fears and force Papen from office and become chancellor himself on 2 December.

After two months of an ineffective Schleicher chancery, Hindenburg appointed Hitler chancellor on 30 January 1933 upon the recommendation of Papen. The Reichstag fire of 27 February was used as a pretext by Hitler to issue the Reichstag Fire Decree, which nullified constitutional protections of free speech and other civil liberties. Reichstag elections in March gave him a working majority, and he assumed dictatorial powers with the passage of the Enabling Act on 23 March. Hitler succeeded Hindenburg as head of state upon his death in 1934, whereafter he abolished the office entirely and replaced it with the new position of Führer und Reichskanzler, cementing his rule until his suicide during World War II in 1945.

Hitler's last will and testament once again separated the two offices, giving the presidency to Karl Dönitz and the chancellorship to Joseph Goebbels. The resulting government, known as the Flensburg Government, governed but a tiny and rapidly receding part of Germany and was not recognized by the Allies. Upon the surrender of the German military they divided Germany into four zones, one controlled each by the British, French, Americans, and Soviets, and collectively governed the whole of Germany with the Allied Control Council. By 1949 three of the zones had coalesced into what became West Germany while the remaining Soviet zone became East Germany; both parts each had their own respective presidential elections starting that year. West Germany's constitution provided that the president be chosen indirectly by means of a Federal Convention consisting of parliamentarians and state delegates. East Germany's constitution provided that the president be chosen indirectly by a joint session of both chambers of parliament, though ultimately only a single person would serve as president before the post was abolished. In 1990, East Germany formally became a part of West Germany and was thus bound by its constitution; the first all-German presidential election since unification, and thus since 1932, was held in 1994. The 1932 election is thus the last Presidential election by universal suffrage in Germany as of 2026.

== Works cited ==
- Childers, Thomas (1983). The Nazi Voter: The Social Foundations of Fascism in Germany, 1919-1933. University of North Carolina Press. ISBN 0807815705.
- Evans, Richard J. (2004). The coming of the Third Reich. New York: The Penguin Press. ISBN 9781594200045.
- Falter, Jürgen W. (1990). "The Two Hindenburg Elections of 1925 and 1932: A Total Reversal of Voter Coalitions". Central European History. 23 (2–3): 225–241. doi:10.1017/S0008938900021361. S2CID 145648611. online
- Jones, Larry Eugene (1997). "Hindenburg and the Conservative Dilemma in the 1932 Presidential Elections". German Studies Review. 20 (2): 235–259. doi:10.2307/1431947. JSTOR 1431947.
- Nicholls, A. J. (1979). Weimar and the Rise of Hitler (2nd ed.). New York: St. Martin's Press, Inc. ISBN 0-312-86066-8.
- Nohlen, D.; Stöver, P. (2010). Elections in Europe: A Data Handbook. Nomos. ISBN 978-3-8329-5609-7.
- Orlow, Dietrich (1969). The History of the Nazi Party: 1919-1933. University of Pittsburgh Press. SBN 822931834.
