= State Party =

State Party may refer to:

- a category of political party in India
- German State Party, a short-lived German political party of the Weimar Republic
- Dutch States Party, a political party in the Netherlands early 1600s–mid 1700s
- Liberal State Party, a political party in the Netherlands 1921–1948
- Roman Catholic State Party, a political party in the Netherlands 1926–1945
- State Party of Serbian, Croatian and Slovene Democrats, a political party in Yugoslavia 1919–1924

== See also ==
- One-party state
