= Karl Vetter =

German Nazi official (1895–1964)

Reichstag Deputy
- In office 12 November 1933 – 8 May 1945

Landtag of Prussia Deputy
- In office 24 April 1932 – 14 October 1933

Personal details
- Born: 15 April 1895 Todtnau, Grand Duchy of Baden, German Empire
- Died: 14 January 1964 (aged 68) Bahía Blanca, Argentina
- Party: Nazi Party
- Occupation: Farmer
- Civilian awards: Golden Party Badge

Military service
- Allegiance: German Empire; Nazi Germany
- Branch/service: Imperial German Army; Schutzstaffel; German Army
- Years of service: 1914–1918; 1934–1945; 1939–1943
- Rank: Leutnant; SS-Standartenführer; Major
- Unit: 2nd Mounted Rifles Regiment; SS Race and Settlement Main Office
- Battles/wars: World War I World War II
- Military awards: Clasp to the Iron Cross, 2nd class Iron Cross, 2nd class Wound Badge

Karl Joseph Vetter (15 April 1895 – 14 January 1964) was a German farmer and estate manager who became a Nazi Party official and politician. He held several agricultural and animal husbandry management positions in the Party and the Reich government, sat as a deputy in the Reichstag from 1933 to 1945 and was also an SS-Standartenführer. After Germany's defeat in the Second World War, he was interned and judged to be an offender in a denazification procedure. Vetter was released from custody in 1948 and emigrated to Argentina in 1951 where he died.

== Early life ==
Vetter was born in Todtnau in the Grand Duchy of Baden. After attending Volksschule and Realschule, he completed an agricultural apprenticeship from 1910 to 1912 and worked as the manager on several large estates until 1914. On the outbreak of the First World War, he enlisted as a one-year volunteer in the Imperial German Army with the 2nd Mounted Rifles Regiment. At the end of the war, he was discharged as a Leutnant of reserves, having been awarded the Iron Cross, 2nd class and the Wound Badge. After the war, he became self-employed as a farmer in Switzerland from 1919 to 1923, and at Wanfried in the Prussian Province of Hesse-Nassau from 1923 to 1925.

== Nazi Party career ==
Vetter was active in the nationalist and antisemitic Young German Order from 1925. On 1 December 1929, Vetter joined the Nazi Party (membership number 177,063) as well as the Sturmabteilung (SA), its paramilitary unit, in which he attained the rank of SA-Sturmführer. From 1930, he served as a district agricultural advisor and later an agricultural specialist in the Party's Agricultural Policy Office. In 1932, he was a Party Kreisleiter in Eschwege and, after the Nazi seizure of power, he was appointed chairman of the Farmers' Association of Kurhessen. He was a member of the board of the Kassel Chamber of Agriculture, the Eschwege district agricultural committee and the Wanfried municipal council, as well as serving as the acting Bürgermeister of Wanfried. In October 1933, he became head of Reich Main Department IV in the Reichsnährstand (Reich Food Estate) under Walther Darré. From June 1935 until February 1937, he was the Reichsnährstand Inspector General.

A member of the Reich Farmers Council, Vetter also served as chairman of the Main Association of the German Grain Industry from July 1934 to June 1935, and as Reich deputy commissioner for the Livestock, Dairy, and Fat Industry from October 1934 to April 1935. He was chairman of the Advisory Board of the Reich Research Institute for Small Animal Breeding in Celle, and was also president of the Association of German Small Animal Breeders. From 18 June 1937, he was the Reich Ministry of Food and Agriculture's special representative to the Four-Year Plan, for issues of small animal breeding and rearing. Vetter was the executive president of the 6th World Poultry Congress, which was held in Leipzig from 24 July to 2 August 1936. At this congress, he was elected president of the World Poultry Science Association, effective 1 January 1937. From 28 July to 7 August 1939, he was the German delegate to the 7th World Poultry Congress, which took place in Cleveland, where he was named an honorary past-president.

=== Elective political offices ===
In April 1932, Vetter was elected as a Nazi deputy to the Landtag of Prussia and served until its dissolution in October 1933. At the November 1933 parliamentary election, he was returned as a deputy to the Reichstag from electoral constituency 19 (Hesse-Nassau) and retained this seat until the end of Nazi rule in May 1945.

=== Membership in the SS ===
On 24 September 1934, Vetter transferred from the SA to the Schutzstaffel (SS) with member number 239,794. He was commissioned as an SS-Obersturmführer on 20 November 1934, rose through the ranks and attained his final promotion to SS-Standartenführer on 5 June 1936. From 20 April 1935 to 14 May 1936, he headed Department V.A of the Race Office in the SS Race and Settlement Main Office.

== Second World War ==
On 26 August 1939, Vetter was drafted into the German Army as a company commander. In January 1940, he was granted a three-month leave from military service at the request of the Ministry of Food and Agriculture. He became the first Vorstand (executive board) member and leader of the Reich Office for Eggs, a monitoring agency. He returned to military service in January 1941, and served in the War Administration Department. In November 1942, he fell ill in Stalingrad and was evacuated to the Eschwege Reserve Hospital to recover. In 1943, he was promoted to Major in the reserves. During his war service, he was awarded the Clasp to the Iron Cross, 2nd class.

== Post-war life ==
After Germany's surrender, Vetter was interned by the Allies. In 1947, he was interrogated in connection with the subsequent Nuremberg Trials. In a denazification process, he was classified as an "incriminated person" (Class II). On 10 July 1948, he was released from the Darmstadt internment camp.

On 7 May 1951, Vetter moved from Wanfried to Hamburg. From there, he emigrated to Buenos Aires in Argentina, on 20 August 1951. In 1955, Vetter applied to the Kassel regional council for a certificate of origin to apply for a war disability pension. Karl Vetter died on 14 January 1964, in Bahía Blanca, Argentina.

== SS Ranks ==
SS Ranks
Date	Rank
20 November 1934	SS-Obersturmführer
17 April 1935	SS-Hauptsturmführer
10 December 1935	SS-Sturmbannführer
23 April 1936	SS-Obersturmbannführer
5 June 1936	SS-Standartenführer

== Sources ==
- Information about Karl Vetter in the Reichstag database
- Schiffer Publishing Ltd., ed. (2000). SS Officers List: SS-Standartenführer to SS-Oberstgruppenführer (As of 30 January 1942). Schiffer Military History Publishing. ISBN 0-7643-1061-5.
- Stockhorst, Erich (1985). 5000 Köpfe: Wer War Was im 3. Reich. Arndt. ISBN 978-3-887-41116-9.
- Vetter, Karl entry in the Hessian Regional History Information System (LAGIS)
