= ISO/IEC JTC 1/SC 17/WG 1 =

ISO/IEC JTC 1/SC 17/WG 1 is a working group within ISO/IEC JTC 1/SC 17 of the International Organization for Standardization (ISO) and the International Electrotechnical Commission (IEC), that facilitates standards development within the field of cards and personal identification. A national delegation of experts from various countries meet in person at WG1 to discuss and debate items detailed in a meeting agenda until a consensus is reached. These items include: draft standards, draft test methods, questions from the industry, proposals for new work items or other aspects relating to the Standards and Test Methods that WG1 bears responsibility for. WG1 meetings are usually held three times a year, typically at the beginning of March, the end of June, and at the beginning of October for a period of 2–3 days. The October meeting is typically held in the days just prior to the SC17 Plenary and at the same location.

== Scope of work ==
Members of WG1 examine and research the physical characteristics, embossing, magnetic stripe, and test methods for conformance and card durability.

== Standards and Test methods ==
WG1 is responsible for maintenance, including revisions, of the following standards and test methods:

Standard	Title	Date published	Test method
ISO/IEC 7810	Identification cards – Physical characteristics	2019	10373-1
ISO/IEC 7811-1	Identification cards – Recording technique – Part 1: Embossing	2018	10373-1
ISO/IEC 7811-2	Identification cards – Recording technique – Part 2: Magnetic stripe – Low coercivity	2018	10373-1, 10373-2
ISO/IEC 7811-6	Identification cards – Recording technique – Part 6: Magnetic stripe – High coercivity	2018	10373-1, 10373-2
ISO/IEC 7811-7	Identification cards – Recording technique – Part 7: Magnetic Stripe – High coercivity, high density	2018	10373-1, 10373-2
ISO/IEC 7811-8	Identification cards – Recording technique – Part 8: Magnetic Stripe – Coercivity of 51,7 kA/m (650 Oe)	2014	10373-1, 10373-2
ISO/IEC 7811-9	Identification cards – Recording technique – Part 9: Tactile identifier mark	2015	10373-1
ISO/IEC 8484	Information technology – Magnetic stripes on savingsbooks	2014	
ISO/IEC 15457-1	Identification cards – Thin flexible cards – Part 1: Physical characteristics	2008	15457-3
ISO/IEC 15457-2	Identification cards – Thin flexible cards – Part 2: Magnetic recording technique	2007	15457-3
ISO/IEC 18328-2	Identification cards – ICC-managed devices – Part 2: Physical characteristics and test methods for cards with devices	2015	
ISO/IEC 24789-1	Identification cards – Card service life – Part 1: Application profiles and requirements	2012	24789-2

Test methods

Test method	Title	Date published
10373-1	Identification cards - Test methods - Part 1: General Characteristics	2020
10373-2	Identification cards - Test methods - Part 2: Cards with magnetic stripes	2015
15457-3	Identification cards - Thin flexible cards - Part 3: Test methods	2008
24789-2	Identification cards - Card service life - Part 2: Methods of evaluation	2011

== See also ==
The Summary of SC 17 Standards contains all current and former Sub-Committee 17 administered standards.
