= Mahraun =

Mahraun is a surname. Notable people with the surname include:

- Artur Mahraun (1890–1950), German far right activist
- Winfried Mahraun (1907–1973), German diver
