= Reinhard Höhn =

German businessman and SS officer

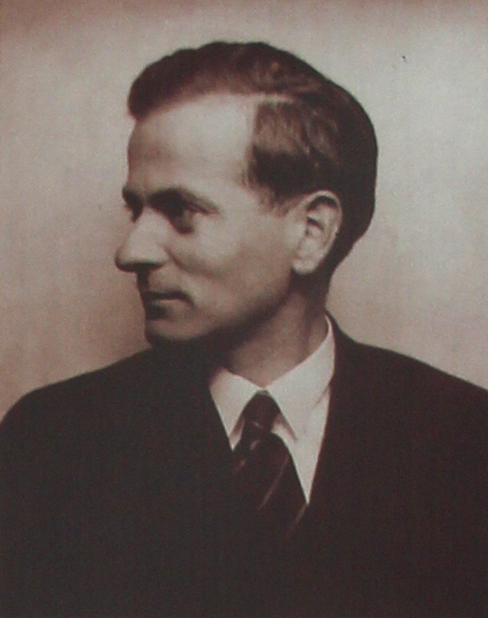
- Born: 29 July 1904; Gräfenthal, Thuringia, Germany
- Died: 14 May 2000 (aged 95); Pöcking, Bavaria, Germany
- Education: Doctorate
- Alma mater: Kiel University; Ludwig-Maximilians-Universität München; University of Jena; Heidelberg University
- Occupation: Lawyer
- Political party: Nazi Party (1933–1945)
- Other political affiliations: Deutschvölkischer Schutz- und Trutzbund (1922–1924); Young German Order (1923–1932)
- Awards: War Merit Cross, 2nd class

Reinhard Höhn (29 July 1904 – 14 May 2000) was a German administrative lawyer and an academic who became a member of the Nazi Party and an SS-Oberführer in its intelligence service, the Sicherheitsdienst (SD). After World War II, he developed the Harzburg Model of business management beginning in the 1950s, which exerted a strong influence on German management training until the 1980s. His past involvement in the Nazi regime was publicized after investigative reporting in 1971.

== Early life and education ==
Höhn was born 29 July 1904 in Gräfenthal, the son of a public prosecutor. He studied law at Kiel University, the Ludwig-Maximilians-Universität München, and the University of Jena, obtained a doctorate in law from Jena, and would go on to earn an habilitation from Heidelberg University in 1934. He was an active militant nationalist, joining the Deutschvölkischer Schutz- und Trutzbund (German Nationalist Protection and Defiance Federation), an antisemitic and Völkisch movement, as early as 1922. He agitated for Der Stahlhelm (The Steel Helmet), a German First World War veteran's organization existing from 1918 to 1935. He was arrested and spent a short while in prison. Between 1923 and 1932, Höhn was a member of the Young German Order and was a close collaborator of its founder, Artur Mahraun.

== Nazi Party career ==
Höhn joined the Nazi Party on 1 May 1933 (membership number 2,175,900), and joined the SS in December (SS number 36,229). He was a member of the Sicherheitsdienst (SD) from 1932 (this is considered "early" as 80% of intellectuals in the SD joined between 1934 and 1938),. In the SD Main Office, later part of the Reich Security Main Office, he became the leader of Department II/2 that had jurisdiction over investigating all "spheres of life" including culture and the economy. His direct superior was Reinhard Heydrich, and he recruited Otto Ohlendorf into his department, later promoting him to chief of staff. Höhn was promoted to SS-Standartenführer on 30 January 1939 and rose to the rank of SS-Oberführer on 9 November 1944.

In 1936, Höhn was named the deputy chairman of the Committee on Police Law in Hans Frank's Academy for German Law. He became professor of constitutional and administrative law at the Humboldt University of Berlin and chair of public law at the University of Jena from 1935 to 1945. During this time he was also director of the Institute for State Research. From 1940 to 1945, he was also a lecturer on administrative law at the Technische Universität Berlin. He was one of the chief architects of National Socialist theory in the Völkisch movement. Höhn was the editor of the journal Deutsches Recht (German Law), the official organ of the National Socialist Association of Legal Professionals. He also was the co-editor of the journal Reich – Volksordnung – Lebensraum (Reich – People's Order – Living Space) from 1941 to 1943, and was the director of the International Academy for Political and Administrative Sciences from 1942. In May 1942, he was awarded the War Merit Cross, 2nd class by Adolf Hitler.

In 1937, Heinrich Himmler entrusted him with the organization of a festival of Nordicism to celebrate Henry the Fowler, founder of the first medieval German State. During this time, he published a debate about whether soldiers should swear an oath to the constitution or to the head of state (be that prince or Führer).

== Post-war life ==
Höhn disappeared from view at the end of World War II and initially worked as a naturopath in Lippstadt and Hamburg. He reappeared as a director for the Akademie für Führungskräfte der Wirtschaft Bad Harzburg (AFK), a business school he founded in 1956 in Bad Harzburg. There, he developed the Harzburg Model of management, which exerted a strong influence on German management training until the 1980s.

In December 1971, the journalist Bernt Engelmann, writing in the newspaper Vorwärts published by the Social Democratic Party of Germany (SPD), brought to light Höhn's past involvement with the Nazi regime as an expert in law, economics and national socialist politics. This caused a public outcry and Helmut Schmidt (then the defense minister) terminated the Bundeswehr's business relationship with Höhn's academy, effective March 1972. In the 1980s, Höhn's management model was gradually replaced with management by objectives in the Federal Republic of Germany.

== Selected written works ==
- Vom Wesen der Gemeinschaft (1934)
- Die Wandlund im staatsrechtlichen Denken (1934)
- Rechtgemeinschaft und Volksgemeinschaft (1935)

== Sources ==
- Höhne, Heinz (1971). The Order of the Death's Head: The Story of Hitler's SS. New York: Ballantine Books. ISBN 0-345-28333-3.
- Klee, Ernst (2007). Das Personenlexikon zum Dritten Reich. Wer war was vor und nach 1945. Frankfurt-am-Main: Fischer-Taschenbuch-Verlag. ISBN 978-3-596-16048-8.
- Schiffer Publishing Ltd., ed. (2000). SS Officers List: SS-Standartenführer to SS-Oberstgruppenführer (As of 30 January 1942). Schiffer Military History Publishing. ISBN 0-7643-1061-5.
- Stockhorst, Erich (1985). 5000 Köpfe: Wer War Was im 3. Reich. Arndt. ISBN 978-3-887-41116-9.
