= Delegation =

One of the core concepts of management leadership

Delegation is the process of distributing and entrusting work to another person. In management or leadership within an organisation, it involves a manager aiming to efficiently distribute work, decision-making and responsibility to subordinate workers in an organization. Delegation may create an accountable chain of authority where authority and responsibility move in an organisational structure. Inefficient delegation may lead to micromanagement.

There are several reasons someone may decide to delegate. These include:

- To free themselves up to do other tasks at their own pace
- To have the most qualified person making the decisions
- To seek another qualified person's perspective on an issue
- To develop someone else's ability to handle the additional assignments judiciously and successfully.

Delegation is widely accepted as an essential of effective management. The ability to delegate is a critical skill for effective management. Several factors facilitate effective delegation, including "Recognising and respecting others’ capabilities; evaluating tasks and communicating how they fit in the big picture; matching people and assignments; providing support and encouragement; tolerating ambiguity and uncertainty; interpreting failure as a key to learning". As organisations are complex and dynamic, achieving objectives depends heavily on how effectively tasks and responsibilities are delegated.

== Process ==
According to Dr. Kanthi Wijesinghe, Senior Lecturer at the National Institute of Education, "Delegation begins when the manager passes on some of their responsibilities to a subordinate. Responsibility is the work assigned to an individual." Delegation is strongly dependent on a supervisor's ability to communicate, motivate, and understand individual preferences and differences. The process of delegation involves ensuring that a task and appropriate employee have been selected. The process of delegation requires "preparation, initiation, implementation, and closure". While a manager can delegate authority for a task, the ultimate responsibility is not transferred. This means that delegation involves a process of sharing, which may include "authority, power, influence, information, knowledge, or risk". This builds trust and morale between managers and subordinates. The internal and external environment of an organisation is often characterised by many interfering factors. Some of these include "too much urgency, inexperience, and lack of trust". In order to minimise the effect of these factors, a clear delegation protocol should be developed and followed within an organisation.

The process of delegation does not always follow a set structure, however, some aspects which are typically involved are:

1. Allocation of duties: the delegator communicates to their subordinate the task which is to be performed. Resources are provided and a time limit is informed.
2. Delegation of authority: In order for the subordinate to perform the task, authority is required. The required authority is granted to the employee when the task is delegated.
3. Assignment of responsibilities: When authority is delegated, the subordinate is assigned with the responsibility of this task. When someone is given the rights to complete a task, they are assigned with the corresponding obligation to perform. Responsibility itself cannot be entirely delegated; a manager must still operate under equal responsibility to the delegated authority.
4. Creation of accountability: At the completion of the delegation process, it is essential that the manager creates accountability, meaning that subordinates must be answerable for the tasks which they have been authorised to carry out.

== Principles ==
There are a number of guidelines which are essential to understanding and implementing the process of delegation. The principles of delegation include:

=== Principle of result expected ===
The authority delegated to an individual subordinate needs to be adequate to ensure their ability to accomplish the results expected of the task. Prior to delegation, the manager needs to know the purpose of such delegation and the results which they expect from it. This means that goals, standards of performance and targets need to be clearly outlined to direct the actions of the subordinate to completion of the task.

=== Principle of parity of authority and responsibility ===
This principle outlines the concept that authority and responsibility co-exist and must go hand-in-hand. This means that the authority which is delegated to an employee must be consistent and equal to that of their responsibility. "Responsibility without authority is meaningless". Each individual in an organisation requires the necessary authorities in order to effectively carry out assigned tasks; disparity should not exist between the responsibility imposed on and the authority granted to an employee in order to carry out a task.

=== Principle of absoluteness of responsibility ===
The principle of absoluteness of responsibility states that delegation of responsibility is not possible. Superiors are unable to relinquish, through the process of delegation, responsibility for the tasks and activities assigned to their subordinates, for they are the ones who delegated this authority and assigned the duty. Responsibility is absolute, with a manager remaining accountable for the actions of their subordinates.

=== Principle of unity of command ===
According to the principle of unity of command, employees should only have one supervisor, who they report to, are granted authority by and receive orders from. This employee should be solely accountable to their direct supervisor. This is associated with increased employee efficiency and less role conflict within an organisation.

=== The scalar principle ===
The scalar principle asserts that there are clear and formal lines of hierarchal authority within an organisation. This hierarchy reflects the flow of authority and responsibility. It clearly outlines to managers and subordinates, who has the power to delegate authority and to whom they are answerable to.

=== Principle of exception ===
This principle asserts that employees should be given complete freedom to fulfill their responsibilities within the purview of their authority. Managers should therefore refrain from interfering with the day-today work of their subordinates, even if minor mistakes are recognized. This level of control leads to more efficient results. In some exceptional cases, managers are able to interfere on matters deviating significantly from the norm; in this case the authority delegated to the subordinate may even be withdrawn.

== Advantages and disadvantages ==
Delegation is considered by some to be an essential and extremely useful management tool. When implemented effectively and successfully delegation results in many benefits to the organisation, manager and subordinate. However, if delegation in unsuccessful and not implemented optimally, the results can lead to serious disadvantages and have resultive effects.

Delegation is one of the best-known methods for efficiently managing time, and is alleged to have numerous benefits within an organisation. One of the most significant advantages of delegation is its use for employee motivation and development. The motivating factor associated with delegations comes from the increased confidence transferred from manager to subordinate. When a supervisor demonstrates their confidence it builds staff trust and self-confidence in the employees. There is a highly significant and positive relationship that exists between delegation and trust between an individual employee and management. Leaders are able to empower subordinates through the sharing of supervisor power. This leads to positive reinforcement of the supervisor's role, builds morale and generates organisation trust. Delegation significantly increases effectiveness and efficiency in multiple ways. It eases the challenges relating to management’ workload, increasing responsiveness and growing and developing the capabilities of employees. Organisational resources are managed more efficiently, and subordinates are able to make decisions and perform tasks faster. Through delegation, lower level employees are able to embrace the opportunity to gain experience, build on capabilities and develop skills, which improves the organisation. Delegation is positively related to organisational commitment, task performance, innovative behavior and job satisfaction. At an organisational level, delegation can provide insight into current strengths and weaknesses, providing the opportunity for improvement and growth. It also increases the capacity of an organisation to respond quickly and effectively.

While the benefits are clear, there are a number of potential disadvantages and challenges to effective delegation. Ineffective use of delegation includes allowing no real influence or granting too much authority to someone who is unwilling or unable to make appropriate decisions. Some supervisors find it challenging to delegate tasks for the fear of becoming out of touch with the required skills or giving up something they truly enjoy. Delegation does involve a level of risk and uncertainty, which can be a powerful deterrent to delegation. When supervisors delegate a task, they remain responsible for whether or not it is carried out effectively and must consider the potential risks and rewards as a result of the delegation. Managers are often reluctant to delegate due to concerns that mistakes will be made, or that the job will not be completed to the standard which they believe they could achieve. Another concern relating to delegation is that top-level management can become wary that middle management will delegate for the benefit of their specific needs rather than those general to the organisation.

== History ==
Delegation became a central feature of training in leadership in the Harzburg Model developed by Reinhard Höhn and taught at the Bad Harzburg Acaademy for Economic Leadership Cadres in Germany from 1956 onwards.
