= 2nd Mounted Rifles =

Military unit

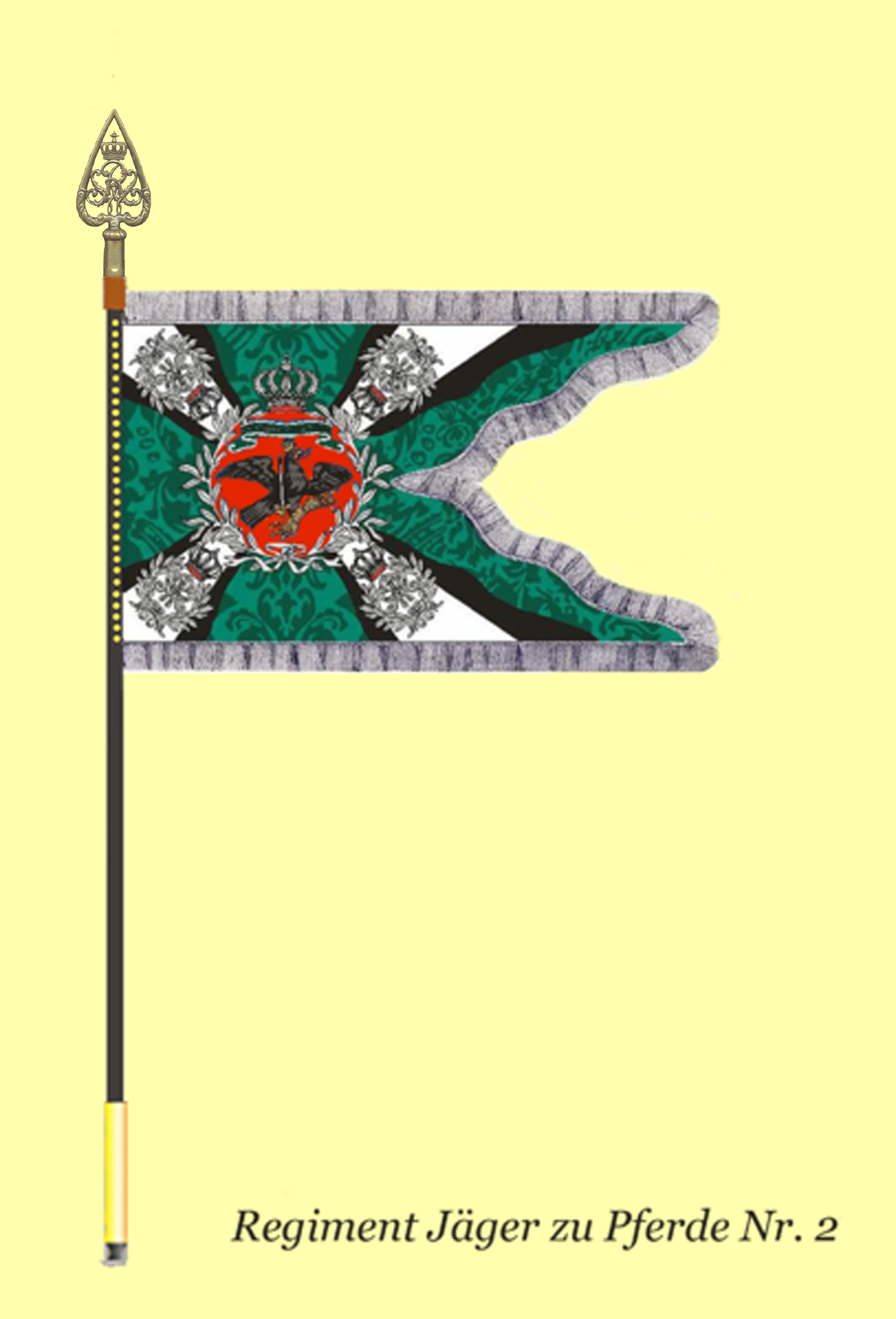
Colors of the royal prussian 2nd Regiment of Mounted Rifles

The 2nd Mounted Rifles were a light cavalry regiment of the Royal Prussian Army. The regiment was formed 1 October 1905 in Langensalza where it belonged to the XI Army Corps.

== See also ==
- List of Imperial German cavalry regiments
