= Young German Order =

Nationalistic German para-military organisation (1920–1933)

Young German Order Jungdeutscher Orden
- Ideology: National liberalism Anti-communism; Corporatism; Populism
- Political position: Centre-right to right-wing (Note: The Young German Order had an right-wing antisemitic element, but was classified as "right-of-centre" by the time because it opposed fascism (especially Nazism), embraced parliamentarism in the Weimar Republic, and advocated political liberalism.)
- National affiliation: People's National Reich Association; German State Party

The Young German Order (German: Jungdeutscher Orden, shortened form Jungdo) (Note: When operating as a Weimar political party, the name People's National Reich Association (Volksnationale Reichsvereinigung, shortened form VNR or VNRV) was preferred.) was a nationalist-liberal association founded by Artur Mahraun in the early years of the Weimar Republic. It grew out of a Freikorps unit but kept its paramilitary structure for only a few years before it turned away from the political Right. It differed from other similar associations in its organisation and customs, which were based on the medieval Teutonic Order, and in its political aims. Mahraun hoped to overcome class and social differences in German society by instilling it with the camaraderie that front-line soldiers had experienced during World War I.

Most of its members belonged to the middle classes. It was antisemitic and in favour of reconciliation with France. It achieved its historical prominence through its brief merger with the left-liberal German Democratic Party to form the German State Party in 1930. It was banned when the Nazi Party came to power in 1933.

== Structure and uniforms ==
The organisation of the Jungdo was hierarchical and based on the medieval Teutonic Order. There were local groups called brotherhoods or sisterhoods. Young members between the ages of 10 and 15 were grouped together in junior troops. For 16- to 19-year-olds, the groups were called junior fellowships (Junggefolgschaften). Several brotherhoods and sisterhoods made up a formation called a Ballei. The leaders of the individual groups were elected and had to be confirmed by the next higher authority, a process known as a "cure". The chairmen of the local groups were known as Grand Masters (Hochmeister) and those of the Balleien as Commanders (Konture). The individual Grand Commanders formed the High Chapter, which was presided over by a Grand Master and was the supreme body of the Order.

The uniform dress of the Jungdo was the field-grey soldier's uniform, the jacket of which was replaced by a windbreaker. There were no rank insignia.

== History ==
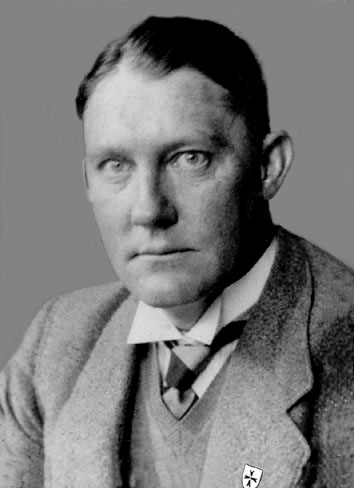
Artur Mahraun, founder and leader of the Young German Order, in 1928

The Young German Order was founded in Kassel on 10 January 1920 by retired captain Artur Mahraun. It grew out of the Freikorps unit Offiziers-Kompanie-Cassel, which Mahraun had founded one year earlier. Mahraun wanted to recreate the camaraderie experienced by soldiers at the front during World War I in order to overcome class and social differences in German society. Estimates of the Jungdo's membership vary widely, from 70,000 in the summer of 1921, 200,000 in 1925, to over a million at peak. Mahraun, however, stated in an interview with the magazine Der Spiegel in 1949 that membership had never exceeded 37,000.

Initially the Jungdo was a nationalist defense association with ties to the political Right through such groups as the paramilitary Organisation Escherich. It kept the underlying structure of a paramilitary for a number of years, although during the Kapp Putsch of 1920, its leadership declared its solidarity with the legitimate government of Chancellor Gustav Bauer of the Social Democrats (SPD). As late as 1923 the Jungdo took part in the resistance to the occupation of the Ruhr.

Mahraun broke away from right-wing groups after only a few years. Historian Ernst Maste wrote:

The initial character of the "middle-class peasant self-protection organisation" was very soon shed; the more general character of the defense association then faded to the extent that the Young German Order, without joining the ranks of the parties, became a political factor comparable to them, although the terms "right" and "left" were soon no longer applicable to its position.

The Jungdo declared its goal to be a "true democratic state structure" from the "compact spaces of neighbourhoods or residential quarters". Mahraun criticised the influence of investors who only supported certain political parties – above all Alfred Hugenberg of the right-wing German National People's Party – which he saw as a constant attempt to distort the true will of the people.

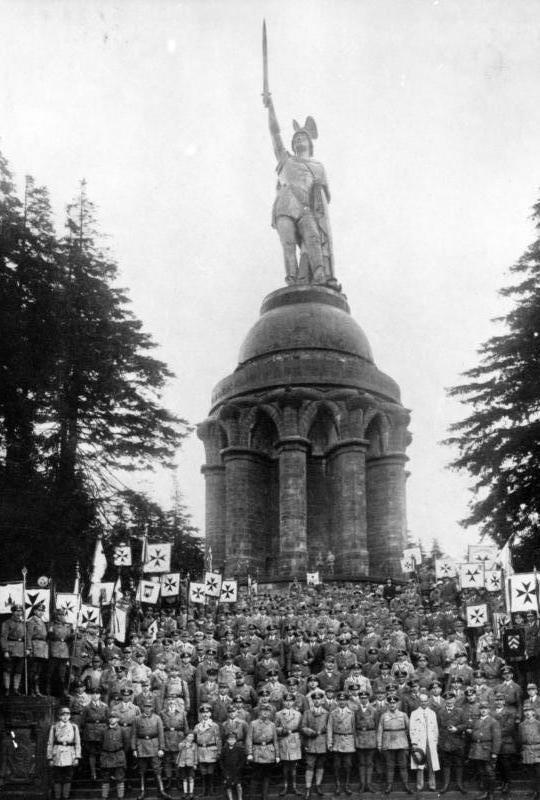
Young German Order rally at the Hermannsdenkmal, 9 August 1925

In northern Bavaria in particular, the Young German Order was notably antisemitic, partly due to its strong personal ties with the Deutschvölkischer Schutz- und Trutzbund (German Nationalist Protection and Defiance Federation). Jews were not permitted to join the organisation beginning in 1922. The Schutz- und Trutzbund district leader for northern Bavaria from 1920 to 1923, Hans Dietrich, was the second commander of the Young German Ballei of Franconia. The German nationalists among the Young Germans in Franconia worked closely with the National Socialists at an early stage, which was an isolated case in the history of the Order. After Hitler's Beer Hall Putsch of 1923, there was a break between the Franconian Ballei and the leadership of the Young German Order, which had declared that it would not actively participate in the Hitler Putsch. Since the Ballei in Franconia nevertheless supported the putsch, Mahraun expelled it from the Jungdo.

The Order's leadership also took a clearly antisemitic stance with regard to the "Jewish question". Mahraun stated in a letter on 9 July 1922: "In Germany there is a Jewish question which has an extraordinarily fragmenting effect, especially in patriotic associations. With the admission of Jews, the ideal of the Order, unity in a fraternal sense, would never be possible. Quarrels and disputes would thwart the best intentions." As a result, an Aryan paragraph excluding non-Aryans (meaning primarily Jews) was introduced into the Young German Order's statutes.

In 1925 the Young German Order campaigned for reconciliation with France and Great Britain and thus distanced itself from reactionary and nationalist groups. For his efforts, Artur Mahraun was accused of high treason by nationalist circles but won the court case. Politicians such as Gustav Stresemann of the German People's Party saw Artur Mahraun and his Young German Order as a respectable political partner.

After the Presidential election of 1925 and the victory of Paul Von Hindenburg, the Jungdo began to take on a more pro-republic stance. This ideological shift led to the Stahlhelm and other anti-republican right wing organization to denounce the Jungdo for its "march to the Left". Mahraun responded by calling these critics "reactionary pawns of plutocratic interests". Mahraun was motivated in this change by a belief that Germany would be best served by the foreign policy of Gustav Stresemann and not by any particular love of the republic.

In 1930 the Young German Order and its subsidiary organisation Volksnationale Reichsvereinigung (People's National Reich Association), founded in 1929, merged with the liberal German Democratic Party to form the German State Party (DStP). As a result of the merger, almost the entire left wing of the DDP split off and founded its own party.

The DStP committed itself to equal rights for all citizens. The electoral alliance confronted the Order with the issue of the Aryan Paragraph and the antisemitic stance of the organisation. While the Nazi Party denounced the antisemitism of the Order and the Volksnationale Reichsvereinigung as unreliable, the Left, liberals and Jewish organisations accused them of a coverup. Prominent DDP politicians such as Gertrud Bäumer took a stand against them. In July 1930 Mahraun claimed that his organisations were far removed from antisemitism in any form. The Young German Order nevertheless did not allow the Aryan paragraph to be shaken as the ethnic and racial basis of its membership, and Mahraun said that it was not antisemitism. The Order and the VNR fought "demagogic antisemitism" for reasons of national unity and pacification and supported the principles of civic equality. The credibility of his statements was frequently attacked.

The historians and political scientists Gideon Botsch and Christoph Kopke consider antisemitism to be a characteristic of the Jungdo, although it was "never at the centre of the Order's ideology and propaganda". There were always disputes between the "more moderate" leadership and regional organisations on the issue.

== Activities ==
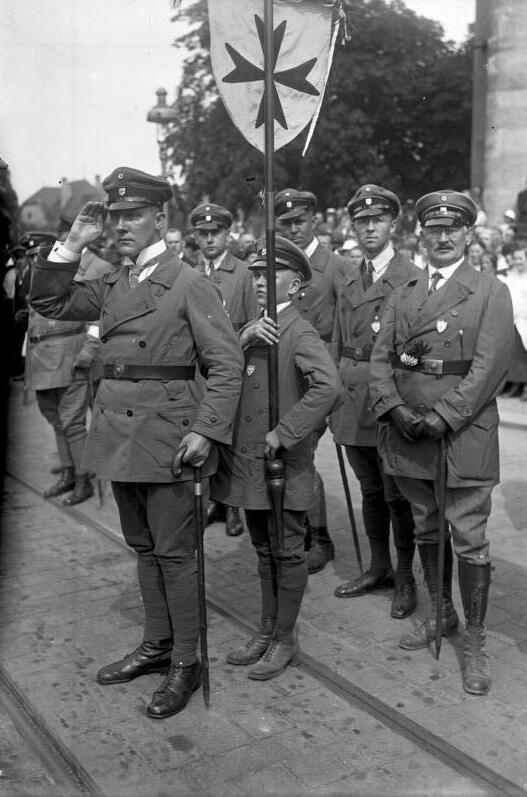
Grand Master Artur Mahraun (saluting), July 1930

Mahraun sought a general compulsory labour service to replace unproductive military service with productive work. He wrote a paper on the subject in March 1924 and sought a referendum to introduce the measure into law, but it failed.

To disseminate its political ideas, the Order maintained its own publishing house, the Jungdeutscher Verlag, which published several magazines and Der Jungdeutsche as a daily newspaper from 1 June 1924. In particular, it published the writings of Artur Mahraun. His book Der nationale Friede am Rhein (The National Peace on the Rhine), which advocated rapprochement with France, came out on 20 November 1926.

== Prohibition ==
After the Nazis came to power in 1933, the Young German Order was banned since it could not be brought into line or integrated into a National Socialist organisation. The Order avoided a ban in Prussia and the associated expropriation by dissolving itself on 3 July 1933 and working underground and in resistance.

=== Notable members in the Nazi era ===
- Artur Mahraun was arrested by the Gestapo on 11 July 1933 and maltreated. He was released on 8 September and had to remain in hiding until the end of the war.
- Wilhelm Adam, a member from 1920 to 1923, was a Wehrmacht Oberst who was captured after the Battle of Stalingrad. He became a politician in East Germany and a general in its National People's Army.
- Paul Giesler. a member from 1920 to 1922, became an SA-Obergruppenführer and the Gauleiter in southern Westphalia and Upper Bavaria. He was named interior minister in Hitler's political testament and died by suicide at the end of the war.
- Reinhard Höhn, a member from 1923 to 1932, had a doctorate in political science and was an important collaborator of Mahraun. He joined the SS in 1932 and made a career in its SD Main Office, but increasingly withdrew from SD work from 1936 onwards. A professor of law, he was editor of Nazi journals and a member of the Academy for German Law. After the war, he headed the Akademie für Führungskräfte der Wirtschaft Bad Harzburg, an "Academy for Executives" in Bad Harzburg.
- Friedrich Jeckeln, a member from 1922 to 1924, was an SS-Obergruppenführer and a Higher SS and Police Leader in the occupied Soviet Union, and was executed as a war criminal.
- Harro Schulze-Boysen was a member from 1928. After the forced dissolution of the Order in June 1933, he worked in several left-wing resistance groups until his arrest and murder in Plötzensee prison on 22 December 1942.
- Gustav Staebe, a member from 1923 to 1926, became a Nazi propagandist for the Hitler Youth, an editor of several Nazi newspapers and a regional administrator of the Reich Press Association from 1937 to 1945.
- Hans von Tschammer und Osten, leader of the Young German Order in Saxony from 1923 to 1926, later became leader of the National Socialist League of the Reich for Physical Exercise.
- Karl Vetter, a member from 1925, became a Nazi Party agricultural specialist who held posts in the Reich Ministry of Food and Agriculture. He was also an SS-Standartenführer and a Reichstag deputy from 1933 to 1945.

The following people were members of the Young German Order in their youth:

- Heinz Jost, commander of the SS Einsatzgruppe A
- Walter Hänsch, commander of Sonderkommando 4b of SS Einsatzgruppe C
- Josias zu Waldeck und Pyrmont, upper SS and Police Leader with the rank of SS-Obergruppenführer
- Hermann Lehmann, senior member of the Sicherheitsdienst (the SS intelligence service) and Reich Security Main Office (RSHA)

== After 1945 ==
After the war, Artur Mahraun opposed the immediate re-establishment of the Young German Order since, in his opinion, the time was not yet ripe for an "order-like" association. He explained his view to his old comrades-in-arms in personal letters and expressly emphasised:

The Young German Order will arise again at a later date. It will then be the bearer of the ideas of the Young German doctrine. Anyone who has ever been a Young German with all his heart has seen the level on which the great saving deed that fate imposes on all German contemporaries must take place. He has seen from afar the political homeland in which the German nomads of the intellectual mass migration are to be settled again.

Until his death, Artur Mahraun devoted himself to building neighbourhoods in local communities.

== Publications ==
- Mahraun, Artur (1927). Das Jungdeutsche Manifest. Volk gegen Kaste und Geld, Sicherung des Friedens durch Neubau der Staaten [The Young German Manifesto. People against Caste and Money, Securing Peace through the Reorganisation of Countries] (in German). Berlin: Jungdeutscher Verlag. OCLC 19331466.
- Der Jung-Deutsche Orden. Magazine published by the Young German Order. Kassel 1921–1922, OCLC 183394371.
- Jahrbuch des Jungdeutschen Ordens. [Yearbook of the Young German Order] Selbstverlag, Kassel 1922–1925, OCLC 183379383.
- Mahraun, Artur (1926). Der nationale Friede am Rhein [The National Peace on the Rhine] (in German). Berlin: Jungdeutscher Verlag. OCLC 246260602.
- Gedichte und Lieder des Jungdeutschen Orden [Poems and Songs of the Young German Order] (in German). Kassel: Selbstverlag. 1920. OCLC 180112075.
- Der jungdeutsche Orden in der Politik [The Young German Order in Politics] (in German). Berlin: Ordensamt des Jungdeutschen Ordens. 1930. OCLC 72676975.
- Mahraun, Artur (1949). Der Protest des Individuums [The Protest of the Individual] (in German). Gütersloh: Nachbarschafts-Verlag. OCLC 24223853.
