= German State Party =

German State Party Deutsche Staatspartei
- Founded: July 1930; 96 years ago
- Dissolved: 28 June 1933; 93 years ago
- Merger of: German Democratic Party; Young German Order (original)
- Merged into: Free Democratic Party (not legal successor)
- Ideology: Liberalism (German); Liberal corporatism Nationalism; Populism; Factions: Social liberalism
- Political position: Centre to centre-right

The German State Party (German: Deutsche Staatspartei or DStP) was a short-lived German political party of the Weimar Republic. The party was formed on 28 July 1930 by the merger of the German Democratic Party with the People's National Reich Association (the political wing of the Young German Order).

== Background ==
Following the 1928 German federal election, the DDP was forced to reckon with electoral losses, and many within the party sought to gain ground by shifting rightward ahead of state and local elections in 1929. Following failed attempts at unifying with the German People's Party and Economic Party in 1930, the party, under the leadership of Erich Koch-Weser, went on to merge with the People's National Reich Association. Several Young Liberals from the DVP also joined the party.

== History ==
As part of the initial merger agreement, the Weser became the leader of the parties Reichstag delegation while Artur Mahraun, the leader of both the VNR, and the Jungdo itself, became the party's national leader.

The merger of the social liberalism of the DDP with the nationalist corporatism of the Young German Order did not prove a successful one: the party lost seats drastically in the 1930 election from its showing in 1928. The party continued to compete in parliamentary elections, with little success. By the November 1932 election, the party was reduced to two seats. After all requests to merge with other parties were turned down, it ran on a joint list with the Social Democratic Party of Germany in the March 1933 election. However, this saw little change in the party's fortunes; it only won five seats.

The poor showing was largely the result of traditional DDP supporters, who opposed the merger, voting for the SPD. Additionally, about half of those who had once supported the Jungdo cast their ballots for the NSDAP instead. The merger collapsed in October 1930 when old-line DDP politicians blocked Koch’s election as faction leader while demanding a liberal platform unacceptable to Mahraun. Once the VNR left the DStP the parties Reichstag delegation was reduced to 14 seats. This crisis led to the resignation of Weser and it was a death blow to German Liberalism.

Herman Dietrich led the party after the October crisis until September 1932, when the party, came under the leadership of Herman Dietrich, Reinhold Maier, and Carl Wilhelm Petersen. The three controlled the party until its demise.

After a 3-2 vote among their parties' Reichstag delegates, the party supported the Enabling Act of 1933 which gave Adolf Hitler of the Nazi Party dictatorial powers. Following the passage of the Enabling Act, the party was the target of severe harassment, as was the case with the other remaining parties. Pro-DStP civil servants defected to the Nazis out of fear for their jobs. Soon after the government banned the SPD, it stripped the State Party of its Reichstag seats, taking the line that since they ran on the SPD list, they were effectively SPD deputies. What remained of the party dissolved on 28 June.

== Election results ==
Election	Votes	%	Seats	+/–
1930	1,322,034	3.78 (7th)	20 / 577	▼5
July 1932	371,800	1.01 (8th)	4 / 608	▼16
November 1932	336,447	0.95 (9th)	2 / 584	▼2
March 1933	334,242	0.85 (9th)	5 / 647	▲3

== See also ==
- Liberalism
- Contributions to liberal theory
- Liberalism worldwide
- List of liberal parties
- Liberal democracy
- Liberalism in Germany
