= Artur Mahraun =

Leader of the Young German Order

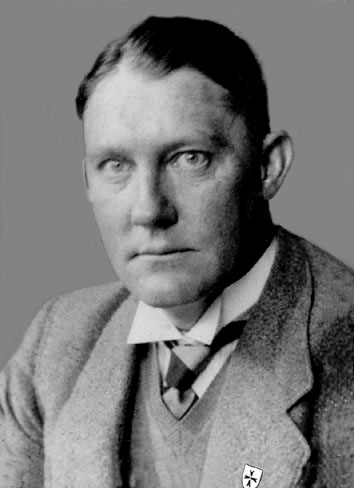
- Born: December 30, 1890; Kassel, German Empire
- Died: March 29, 1950 (aged 59); Gütersloh, West Germany
- Military career
- Allegiance: German Empire
- Branch: Imperial German Army
- Conflicts: First World War

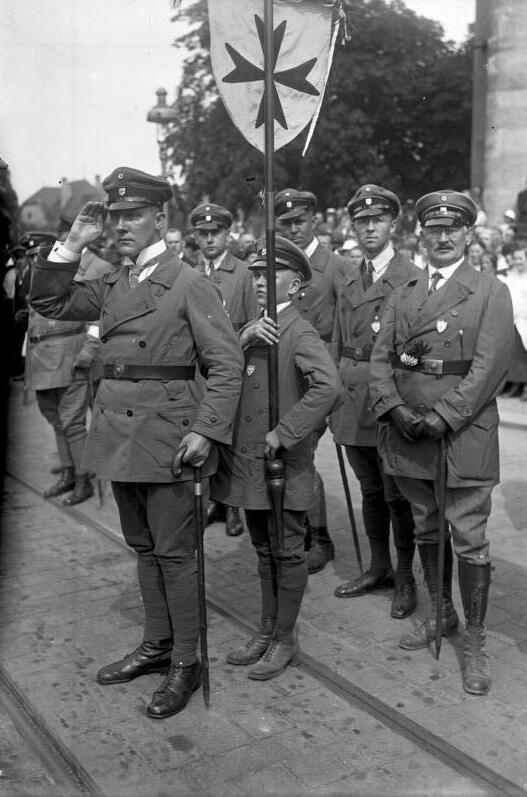
Artur Mahraun, July 1930

Artur Mahraun (30 December 1890 – 29 March 1950) was the founder and leader of the Young German Order (Jungdeutscher Orden or Jungdo) and an early contender for the leadership of the right-wing youth in Weimar Germany.

== Biography ==
Born the son of a privy councillor in Kassel, Mahraun became a career soldier with the Prussian Army when he enlisted in the Prussian Infantry Regiment No. 83 in 1908. He served with distinction on the Eastern Front during the First World War, earning "high decorations".

Like many of his contemporaries he became involved in Freikorps activity after the Armistice, forming his own group, the Officers' Company Kassel (Offizierkompagnie Kassel) in January 1919, though he left this group in 1920, then founding the Young German Order in March of that year. And by 1921 Mahraun could call on 70,000 followers. And at its peak Mahraun's movement could call on up to 300,000 followers.

After the Presidential election of 1925 and the victory of Paul Von Hindenburg, the Mahraun began to take on a more pro-republic stance. This ideological shift led to the Stahlhelm and other anti-republican right wing organization to denounce him and the Jungdo for its "march to the Left". Mahraun responded by calling these critics "reactionary pawns of plutocratic interests". Mahraun was motivated in this change by a belief that Germany would be best served by the foreign policy of Gustav Stresemann and not by any particular love of the republic.

Mahraun entered the political arena in 1928 when he formed the People's National Reich Association (Volksnationale Reichsvereiningung) as an electoral arm of his movement, merging it with the German Democratic Party to form the German State Party in 1930 due to the alarming rise of radicalism after the 1929 stock market crash. However the new party was not successful and it performed very poorly in subsequent elections.

Mahraun's party and the Jungdo were banned in 1933 after the Nazi's seizure of power and he was imprisoned for several weeks by the Gestapo, during this time he suffered severe mistreatment which would cause long-term health problems. He survived Nazi rule but under constant surveillance and moving constantly.

After the war, Artur Mahraun opposed the re-establishing the Young German Order since, in his opinion, it was not the proper time for an "order-like" association. He explained his view to his old comrades-in-arms in personal letters and expressly emphasized:

The Young German Order will arise again at a later date. It will then be the bearer of the ideas of the Young German doctrine. Anyone who has ever been a Young German with all his heart has seen the level on which the great saving deed that fate imposes on all German contemporaries must take place. He has seen from afar the political homeland in which the German nomads of the intellectual mass migration are to be settled again.

He was briefly associated with a group called the Nachbarschafts-Bewegung (English: Neighborhood Movement) after the war, but apart from a few speeches at assemblies, he limited himself to writing. His literary output is extensive, though because he self-published them they failed to circulate past his limited number of supporters. They covered a wide range of topics including: political commentary, poetry, and political theory.

He died in Gütersloh in 1950.

== Political positions ==
During the early years of his political career Mahraun was firmly situated on the Political Right, as time went on he distanced himself further and further from the Right. His domestic politics were based compromise, especially overcoming class conflict, and bringing the divide between the Republicans and Anti-Republicans. Mahraun believed that caste divisions tore Germany apart, and that a spirit of peoples unity (German: Volksgemeinschaft) which had first been established amongst the soldiers of World War 1 needed to be re-established. After 1925 he took on a more populist orientation.

A strong believer in law and order, he rejected revolutionary activity and instead called for Germany to reconcile with France and rebuild her prestige through Franco-German co-operation. While condemning the co-operation between the Reichswehr and the Soviet Red Army.

After meeting Adolf Hitler during the Beer Hall Putsch he quickly became a critic of the Nazi leader and was strongly opposed to National Socialism.
