= Great Depression in Germany =

Economic downturn from 1929 to 1935

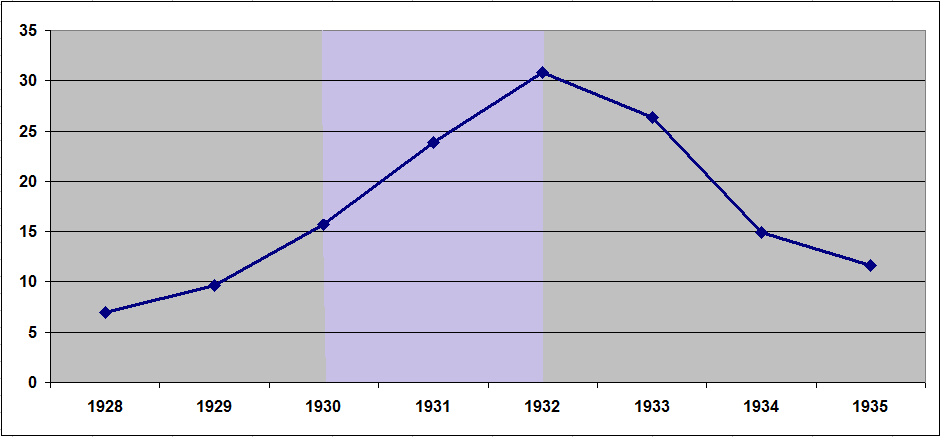
Unemployment rate in Germany from 1928 to 1935. The Brüning period is highlighted.

The Great Depression in Germany (German: Weltwirtschaftskrise in Deutschland) was a severe economic downturn during the late Weimar Republic and early years of Nazi Germany. As part of the global Great Depression of 1929 to 1939, it had profound effects on the nation both economically and politically. At its peak in 1932/33, Germany's unemployment rate hit 30%, with nearly six million unemployed. The economic crisis exacerbated the political weaknesses of the Weimar Republic. Germans lost faith in the centrist parties that had been in control of its governments and turned increasingly to the Communist Party of Germany (KPD) on the far left and the Nazi Party on the far right. The effects of the Great Depression played a significant role in Adolf Hitler's rise to power in 1933.

The depression hit Germany especially hard because it had become highly dependent on American loans during the second half of the 1920s. When American banks began calling in the loans after the Wall Street crash of late October 1929, it led to a major capital crisis in Germany. The government's fiscal and monetary problems were made worse by Germany's large World War I reparations debt. Chancellor Heinrich Brüning introduced a policy of austerity and deflation in an attempt to handle the twin crises. After the Reichstag rejected his initial proposals, he began ruling by decree, marking the start of the presidential cabinets that continued until the end of the Weimar Republic. Rather than improving Germany's economic situation, Brüning's deflationary measures made it worse. The two short-lived cabinets that followed Brüning's failed to halt either the economic slide or the rise of the Nazis. After Adolf Hitler became chancellor in 1933, he used public works projects, a massive rearmament program and deficit spending to return Germany to near full employment by 1939.

== Background ==
When the German Empire entered World War I in 1914, it was a technologically and industrially advanced country with an overall high standard of living. The enormous monetary and human costs of the war worsened Germany's economic situation dramatically. Its central bank, the Reichsbank, suspended convertibility of paper money to gold at the beginning of the war. Most of the costs of the war were covered by debt that the government expected to repay with reparations extracted from its enemies after a German victory. By 1918 Germany's national debt had reached 94% of its gross domestic product (GDP). Industrial production, which was severely affected by the Allied blockade of Germany, fell to 57% of its pre-war value and per capita GDP to 73% of the 1913 level.

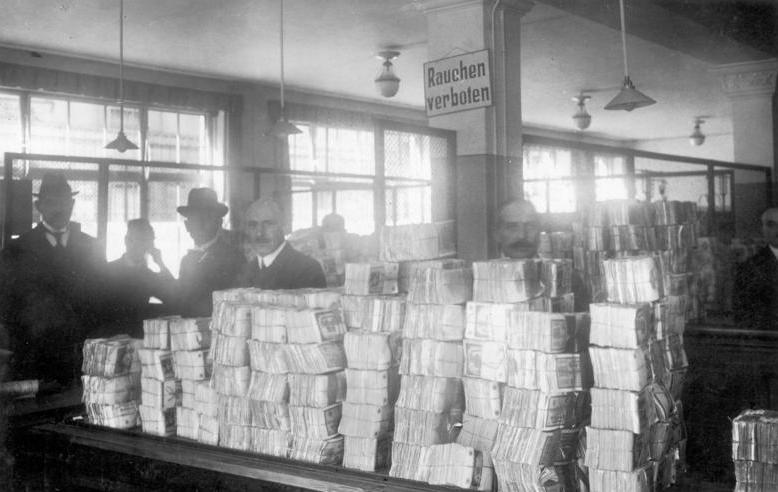
Piles of new banknotes awaiting distribution at the Reichsbank during the Weimar hyperinflation

Prior to 1923, unemployment remained mostly below 5% even as millions of demobilized soldiers returned to the workforce. Fear of social unrest led employers, with the support of the government, to accept high wage settlements (the Stinnes-Legien Agreement) even though it was known that inflation would likely follow the higher pay packages. The government turned primarily to the Reichsbank and the inflationary practice of printing money to cover its budget deficits. Most workers' real wages were significantly lower in January 1922 than they had been in 1913 due to the effects of inflation. In May 1921, the German economy received a major shock when the World War I Allies presented Germany with a reparations bill of 132 billion Reichsmarks, roughly equivalent to $400 billion in 2010 dollars. After the Inter-Allied Reparations Commission declared Germany in default in January 1923 and French and Belgian troops occupied the Ruhr, the government backed a policy of passive resistance. To underwrite the enormous losses of idled factories and mines and to pay jobless workers, it again resorted to printing money. The massive amount of new currency introduced into circulation caused the nation's already rising cost of living to explode into the unprecedented Weimar hyperinflation of 1923. The collapse of the Reichsmark's value made individuals' monetary savings all but worthless. The hyperinflation was quickly stopped by the introduction of the Rentenmark in November, but the experience left many Germans on both the left and the right bitter with the Weimar Republic and the capitalist economic system.

The period from 1924 to 1929 came to be known as the Golden Twenties in Germany. The economy improved along with its foreign relations, and civil unrest decreased. National income rose by 25% between 1925 and 1928. An essential basis for the stabilization was the restructuring of reparations through the 1924 Dawes Plan. It brought the Weimar Republic a significant inflow of American loans from both state funds and private investors. The money served as start-up financing for reparations and as an aid to economic revival. But while Germany's recognition of its reparations obligations promoted reintegration into the European state system and world markets, it also led to a strong dependence on American capital. Public anger continued over reparations payments, as shown in the failed 1929 referendum against the Young Plan. The Treaty of Versailles and its reparations demands played a significant role in Nazi propaganda during Adolf Hitler's rise to power.

== Onset ==
The worldwide Great Depression triggered by the Wall Street crash of late October 1929 hit Germany harder than any country except the United States. The key reason was that Germany had become so heavily dependent on American loans. The hyperinflation of 1923 had significantly reduced Germans' ability and desire to save. Due to the resulting shortage of domestic capital, Germany turned to foreign sources, primarily in the United States. Furthermore, of the 20.6 billion marks in foreign loans that came into Germany before 1931, roughly half were short term. When American banks began calling in the loans after the Wall Street crash, it caused a major capital crisis in Germany. German industry, which had still been investing in the first part of 1929, faced significant overcapacity as orders plummeted. Production shrank, workers were let go and some firms collapsed. A self-reinforcing downward spiral followed, with declining purchasing power leading to falling demand, falling production and more layoffs. The crisis also affected agriculture. By 1931/32, agricultural output had fallen to 62% of its 1928/29 level. Many small and mid-sized farms went into foreclosure.

=== Bank crisis and reparations ===
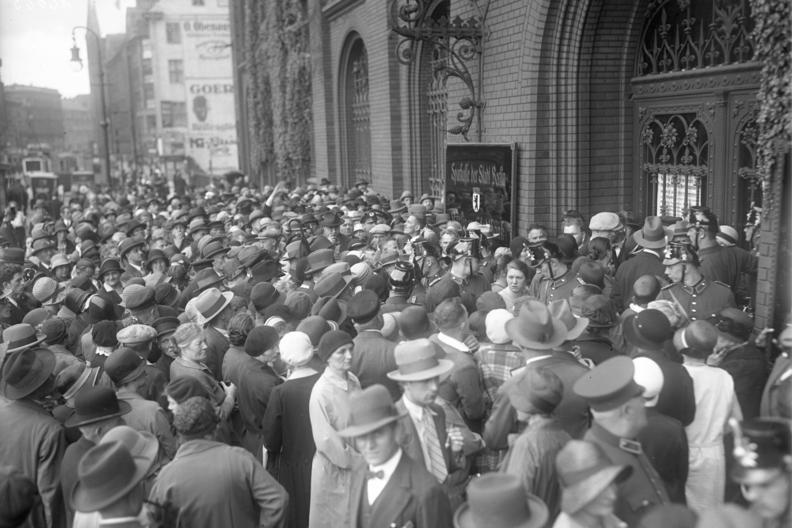
A crowd outside the Berlin Savings Bank after the closure of the banks, 13 July 1931

A second wave of loan recalls took place after the September 1930 Reichstag election in which the Nazi Party went from 12 to 107 seats and became the second strongest party in the German parliament. Then in May 1931, the Creditanstalt Bank of Vienna collapsed at the peak of the European banking crisis of 1931, sending economic shock waves into Germany. The Reichsbank lost 180 million marks in the first week of June and 540 million in the second. In July Germany's second largest bank, the Darmstädter und Nationalbank (Danat), became insolvent. The German government briefly closed all banks to avoid a run and infused the Reichsbank with 250 million marks. On 15 July 1931, the Reichsbank suspended the convertibility of the Reichsmark, effectively taking Germany off the gold standard. In an attempt to stabilize the world monetary system, U.S. President Herbert Hoover gained European agreement for a moratorium on payment of war reparations. The Lausanne Conference in June/July 1932 failed to find a permanent resolution to the reparations problem, and Germany did not resume payments.

=== Economic statistics ===
In 1932, key indices of the German economy were down an average of 38% from 1928. Unemployment stood at 30%, with the number of unemployed pushing towards the six million mark. The average income of German workers, who had been the best paid in Europe coming into the depression, was at 62% of its 1928 level, although real income was still at 86% because deflation had brought consumer prices down to 67% of the 1928 mark. Hardest hit were workers in heavy industry and the building trades, along with 18 to 30 year olds. Sixty percent of university graduates were reported to be out of work, reflecting the high unemployment that also affected government and white-collar workers. Crime and suicides both increased.

Effects of the depression on the German economy (1928 = 100)
	1929	1930	1931	1932	1933
Gross National Product	101	94	79	65	67
Gross investment	77	60	28	33	41
Industrial production	102	87	69	58	66
Capital goods production	103	81	61	46	49
Consumer goods production	97	91	87	74	74
Consumer prices	98	91	-	67	67
Private consumption	103	98	84	67	68
Average income	101	94	80	62	63
Real income	106	107	102	86	84
Stock prices (1924/26 = 100)	134	109	81	55	67
Employment (in millions)	17.9	16.5	14.4	12.5	13.4
Unemployed (in millions)	1.9	3.7	5.1	5.3	6.0
Percent unemployed	9.6	15.7	24	30	26

Germany had introduced a government program of unemployment insurance in 1927, the year when per capita GDP exceeded pre-war levels for the first time. Paid for equally by employers and employees, the insurance covered 26 weeks of unemployment, after which the unemployed had to rely on welfare at the local level. The system, funded to handle up to 1.4 million people, was overwhelmed by the massive increase in the number of unemployed after the depression began. At the start of 1929, it was covering 80% of the unemployed; by January 1932, that had sunk to 30%.

The financial distress of the unemployment insurance program caused the first significant political crisis of the depression era. The government of Hermann Müller of the Social Democratic Party (SPD) – a grand coalition that included parties stretching from the working-class SPD to the business-oriented German People's Party (DVP) – found it impossible to reach an agreement on who should bear the financial burden of stabilizing the system. The government resigned on 27 March 1930 and was replaced three days later by the first cabinet of Heinrich Brüning of the Centre Party. Müller's government was the last during the Weimar Republic to be based on parliamentary majorities. The three presidential cabinets that followed ruled largely without the Reichstag, using the emergency powers that the Weimar Constitution granted to the German president.

== Government responses ==
=== Heinrich Brüning and deflation ===
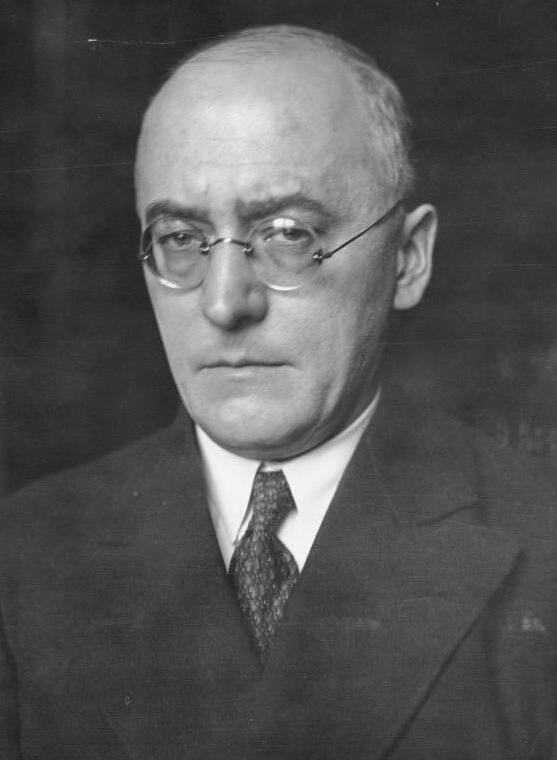
Heinrich Brüning, German chancellor from 30 March 1930 to 1 June 1932. His failure to manage the effects of the Great Depression earned him the nickname 'hunger chancellor'.

From the time of its formation, Brüning's government departed from parliamentary norms. Germany's president, Paul von Hindenburg, had made it clear when he appointed Brüning that his cabinet was to be built without regard to coalition ties. Made up of members of seven parties, the cabinet did not command a majority in the Reichstag. Lacking any ministers from left-of-center parties, it was considerably more conservative than the previous SPD-led Müller government. In his first statement to the Reichstag, Brüning announced a policy of governmental austerity and deflation. His budget proposal included a significant reduction in social services, higher consumption taxes and tariffs on agricultural goods. The austerity budget was meant to balance state expenditures with its falling revenues. At the same time, state-mandated wage and price cuts were to reduce production costs, which Brüning hoped would ensure a positive trade balance when coupled with reduced imports. Once the Allies had been convinced to end reparations and the depression had reached its low point, the mark would be devalued and put Germany in a leading position as the export market revived. Industry, labor and the classic economic thinking of the time all initially agreed that a policy of deflation, although painful at first, was the only way for Germany to fight its way out of the depression.

Initially, Brüning's domestic, economic and financial policies were subordinate to his push to eliminate reparations. He intended to accomplish that end by meeting the renegotiated reparations schedule of the Young Plan, which the Müller government had ratified just weeks before Brüning became chancellor. The obvious suffering of the German people under a policy of deflation, which was fully compliant with the Young Plan, would prove that fulfilling the reparations payment schedule was not feasible in the long term. Once Germany was freed of its reparations burden. Brüning hoped to make Germany Europe's strongest continental power through a complete revision of the European system that had developed under the Treaty of Versailles. That would in turn, he thought, help calm Germany's internal political situation.

In the 1970s, economic historian Knut Borchardt presented a different interpretation of Brüning's motives. He argued that the German economy was so constrained by factors such as its massive foreign debt, shortage of capital and high wages that Brüning had no viable alternative to embarking on a program of austerity and deflation.

Brüning succeeded in pushing a first bundle of austerity measures through the Reichstag with the help of both conservatives and the SPD, but in mid-July the Reichstag rejected a part of his budget for 1930 by a vote of 256 to 193. With Hindenburg's approval, he then used Article 48 of the Weimar Constitution to issue two emergency decrees to implement the budget plans. The Reichstag, also using the provisions of Article 48, almost immediately reversed the decrees on a 236 to 222 vote. Hindenburg then dissolved the Reichstag, and more rigorous versions of the previous emergency decrees were put into effect.

The September 1930 Reichstag election was a triumph for the Nazi Party. It gained an additional 95 seats to become the second strongest in the Reichstag behind the SPD; third was the Communist Party. The results made it impossible for Brüning to build a majority coalition. Only because the SPD agreed to tolerate his cabinet was he able to survive votes of no confidence. Confronted with a weakened political position and the still worsening economic, social and political crisis, Brüning turned away from the Reichstag and began to rule through emergency decrees, cementing his government as a presidential cabinet. The number of emergency decrees issued quickly grew to exceed the number of laws passed by the Reichstag:

Uses of Article 48 1930–1932
Year	Sitting days of the Reichstag	Laws passed by the Reichstag	Laws passed under Article 48
1930	94	98	5
1931	41	34	44
1932	13	5	60
Totals		137	109

Shortly after the end of his term as chancellor on 31 May 1932, the Allies at the Lausanne Conference agreed to lower Germany's reparations debts by 90%, but by then the German economy was in far worse shape than it had been when Brüning took office in 1930. Unemployment had almost doubled to some six million, and Germany's GNP had fallen by nearly a third. By the summer of 1931, the party-spanning support for a policy of deflation began to break down in the face of the ever worsening economic situation. The agreement in the Hoover Moratorium on war debt repayments in July 1931 also made it harder for Brüning to use ending reparations as a justification for his policies. In economic terms, deflation had singularly failed to work:

Brüning's policies between 1930 and 1932 can be characterized as a race between the internal crisis and the solution of the problem of reparations in external affairs. The successes won over reparations and other matters concerning foreign affairs were however bought dearly, in so far as they hindered an active policy of dealing with the crisis. There are in fact many indications to support the thesis that the Brüning government attempted to settle the reparations problem by means of orthodox financial and economic policies, before facing the tasks at home.

As a result of the government's subordination of the fight against mass unemployment to the goal of ending reparations payments, and because there was no significant state program to create jobs, the Brüning government increasingly lost the confidence of the population. More critically for Brüning, he also lost Hindenburg's support. On 31 May 1932, Hindenburg forced Brüning's resignation and the next day appointed Franz von Papen chancellor on the recommendation of General Kurt von Schleicher.

=== Papen, Schleicher and Hitler ===
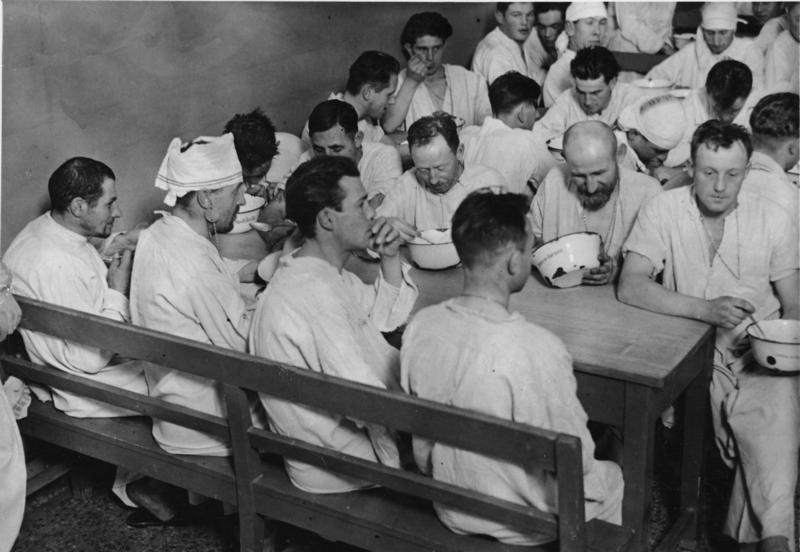
Dining hall of a homeless shelter in Berlin-Prenzlauer Berg, 1932

The Papen cabinet, which lasted only six months, primarily backed the interests of military leadership and Junker owners of large agricultural estates east of the Elbe river. Industrialists were represented only secondarily and workers and the middle classes not at all. Papen accused past Weimar governments of instituting state socialism and wanting to turn Germany into a "welfare institution". Papen's cabinet had almost no support in the Reichstag. Only three days after his appointment, he was faced with such intense opposition that he had Hindenburg dissolve the Reichstag and call a new election for 31 July. The Nazi Party ran on a program of "work and bread" and in an economic immediate-action program promised "job creation through productive credit creation". The party picked up 123 seats to become the largest party in the Reichstag.

On 12 September, the Reichstag passed a motion of no confidence against the Papen cabinet in a 512–42 vote, and Hindenburg called for another snap election. When it left Papen still unable to form a coalition that would support him, Hindenburg removed him and named Schleicher chancellor. In his inaugural declaration, Schleicher emphasized job creation as his government's major goal. Through a program of public works, two million unemployed were put to work by July 1933, but his indecision on the matter of agricultural tariffs angered the large landowners in the eastern provinces of Germany. When Schleicher found out that Papen was working with Hitler to oust him, he went to Hindenburg with a plan for a state of emergency. After Schleicher backed down in the face of Hindenburg's reluctance to make such a move, the conservatives who opposed the Nazis also attacked him. With virtually all his support lost, Schleicher resigned on 28 January 1933, opening the way for Hitler to be named chancellor.

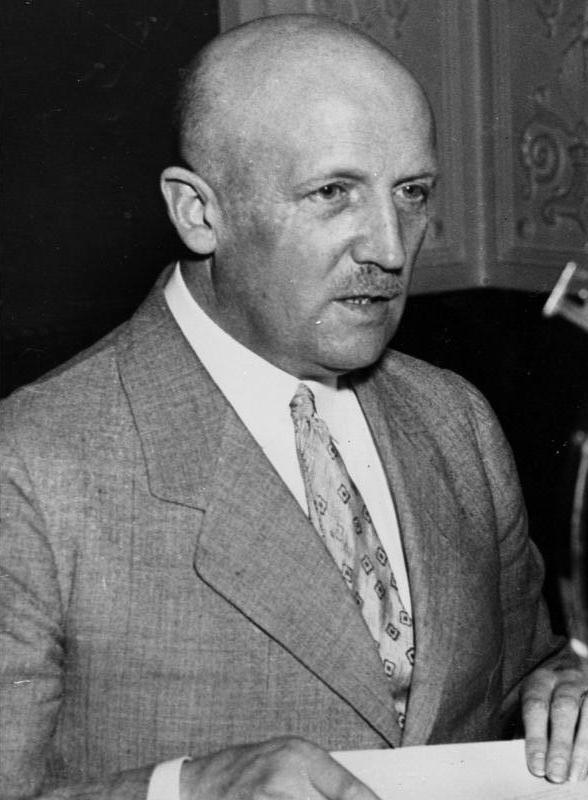
Kurt von Schleicher, the last German chancellor before Adolf Hitler. He introduced the public works programs that the Nazis continued.

In its first years, the Nazi government continued the economic policies introduced by the Schleicher government. Under Hjalmar Schacht as president of the Reichsbank (1933) and minister of economics (1934), the government undertook large public works programs such as the construction of the Autobahn network in order to stimulate the economy and reduce unemployment. Schacht created a scheme for deficit financing in which capital projects were paid for with the issuance of promissory notes called Mefo bills that could be traded between companies. When the notes were presented for payment, the Reichsbank printed money.

By far the largest program that the Nazi government embarked on was an enormous military buildup financed largely through deficit spending, including Mefo bills. Between 1933 and 1939, the total revenue of the German government amounted to 62 billion Reichsmarks, whereas government expenditure, up to 60% of which consisted of rearmament costs, exceeded 101 billion Reichsmarks. The imbalance caused huge deficits and a rising national debt that by 1939 reached 38 billion Reichsmarks, equivalent to €169.0 billion in 2021. Price, rent and wage controls helped keep inflation in check. Hitler and his economic team expected that the planned territorial expansion through war would provide the wealth and manpower to repay the national debt. By 1939, the year Germany invaded Poland to start World War II, unemployment had practically been eliminated.

== Evaluation ==
The Great Depression, and especially Heinrich Brüning's deflationary policies, not only crippled Germany economically but also had serious social and political consequences. The mass unemployment and economic hardships led many people to blame the Weimar Republic for their suffering. Politics radicalized as voters moved away from the center-left and centrist parties that had supported the Republic and gave their support to the Communist Party on the left and the Nazis on the right. Between the May 1928 and the July 1932 Reichstag elections, the Nazis went from 12 to 230 seats and the KPD from 54 to 89, giving them 319 of 608 total seats (52.5%), enough to block any moderate coalition from forming a majority. According to historian Dieter Petzina,

The internal political situation was characterized on the one hand by the rapid growth of the right-wing anti-democratic forces whose breakthrough into a mass movement was made possible by the impoverishment of millions, and on the other by the decline and deformation of the parliamentary system and the transition to the politics of presidential cabinets and emergency laws. But these could do nothing to halt the growing crisis. Economic helplessness gradually produced and merged with the helplessness of the democratic system, establishing a cause and effect relationship between the crisis and the fall of the Weimar Republic.
