= The Hague conference on reparations =

Conference on World War I reparations (1929–30)

The Hague conference on reparations of 1929–30 was an international conference on World War I reparations that reviewed and adopted the Young Plan, the final attempt during the Weimar Republic to settle the reparations issue. The conference was held in The Hague, Netherlands in two parts, from 6 to 31 August 1929 and from 3 to 31 January 1930.

The first session centred around British demands for better terms and a larger share of the reparations payments for itself. Compromises, mostly on Germany's side, eventually resolved the issues. Outside of the formal Young Plan discussions, France agreed to an early withdrawal of the troops occupying the Rhineland in exchange for German concessions on reparations. The second session, which took place after the Wall Street crash of October 1929, set up the Bank for International Settlements to handle the transfer of payments between countries and settled the remaining Young Plan issues despite sometimes furious objections from Germany's Hjalmar Schacht. The Young Plan and the separate agreement on evacuation of the Rhineland were signed on 20 January 1930.

== Background ==
The 1924 Dawes Plan set up a framework that stabilized the German currency and made it possible for Germany to access capital markets in the United States for loans that it could then use to make reparations payments under a more favourable schedule than previously. Even though it led to a notable upswing in the German economy, France, the United States and Germany were looking for a more permanent solution by 1928.

Following extensive diplomatic consultations during the autumn meeting of the League of Nations, the six interested powers – Germany, France, Great Britain, Belgium, Italy and Japan – agreed on 16 September 1928 to set up an international commission of experts under the leadership of American economist Owen D. Young to settle the reparations question and at the same time to begin negotiations on the evacuation of foreign troops from the Rhineland. The fourteen international financial experts who were selected to draw up the new reparations plan were to be independent and guided only by their economic expertise.

The governments of the six powers that had commissioned the drafting of the Young Plan agreed to it in principle in June 1929. In order to put it into effect and to agree on an early withdrawal from the last occupied zone of the Rhineland, they decided to hold a conference. The French and German foreign ministers, Aristide Briand and Gustav Stresemann, agreed at the Madrid meeting of the League of Nations in June 1929 that the "general winding up of the war" should be decided there, i.e. the consensual and final settlement of all questions still arising from the First World War.

== First session ==
The first part of the conference, which met from 6 to 31 August 1929 in The Hague, showed that British-French solidarity on the reparations question had broken down. The British Chancellor of the Exchequer, Labour Party politician Philip Snowden, made three demands: deliveries in kind (such as coal) that affected British trade negatively would have to be limited; Britain would be entitled to a higher share of German reparations; and their share was to be payable under all circumstances according to the distribution formula established at the Spa Conference of 1920. All in all, Snowden demanded an increase in annual reparations payments to Britain by the equivalent of 48 million Reichsmarks. He came into sharp, even personal, arguments with his French colleague, Finance Minister Henry Chéron, over the demands. Snowden signalled to Germany that he was prepared to let the whole Young Plan fall through if necessary. He noted that it would cause a serious financial crisis, but the transfer protection of the Dawes Plan would remain in force, and "Germany would be better off in a few months than at present". The Germans did not want to go along because, as Finance Minister Rudolf Hilferding informed them, the savings in reparations that would result from the Young Plan had already been "completely used up" in the 1930 budget. If the Young Plan were to come to nothing, it would not only cause a financial crisis but would also plunge Germany into immediate financial difficulties. The German government was not prepared to accept such an outcome.

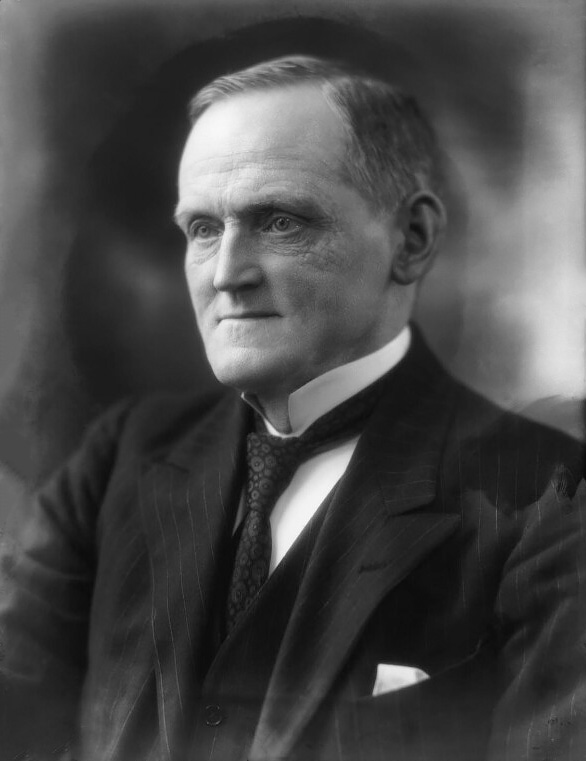
Lord Philip Snowden. He drove a hard line for British interests at the first session.

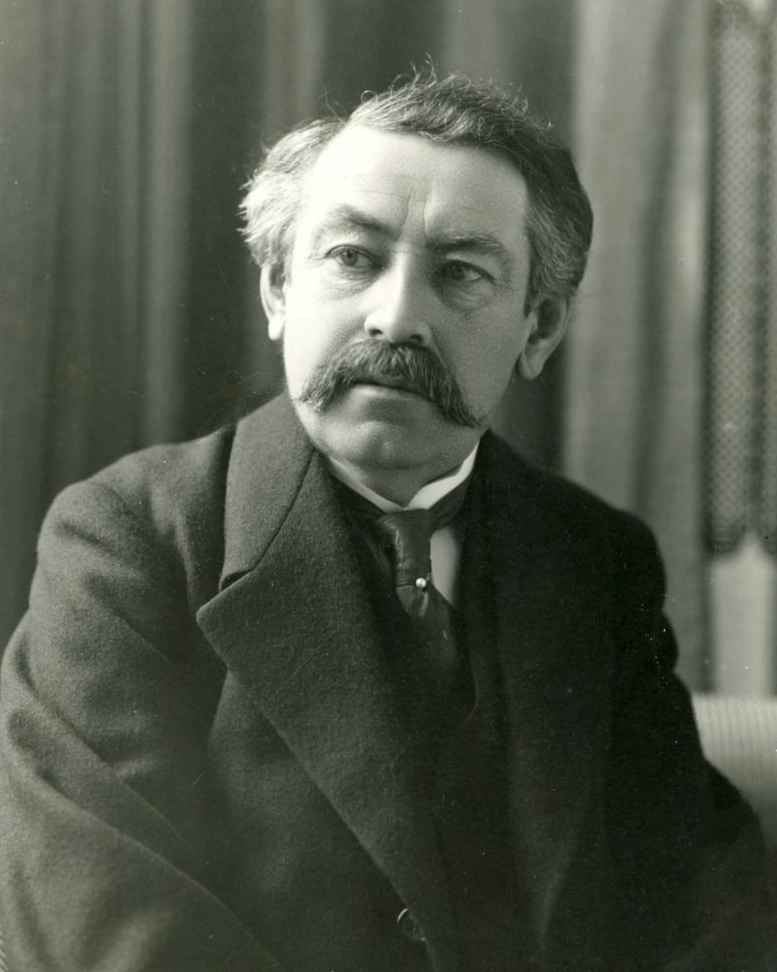
Aristide Briand, who represented France at the conference

Snowden stubbornly insisted on his demands for several weeks, which also delayed the negotiations on the withdrawal of troops from the Rhineland. For domestic political reasons, Briand, who had become prime minister for the eleventh time, refused to set a date for the evacuation before an agreement had been reached on the reparations issue. A solution was finally agreed upon that shifted the amounts due to the various creditors. Germany waived the so-called surplus, the difference between the Dawes Plan and the Young Plan during the five-month transition period, amounting to 300 million Reichsmarks. That alone satisfied three-quarters of the British demands. At a cost to Germany of several million Reichsmarks annually, Stresemann also waived any possibility of payment deferrals. Compromise solutions were found as well on the question of deliveries in kind.

Briand was then prepared to give in on the withdrawal from the Rhineland and agreed to 30 June 1930 as the final date for the occupation. He also dropped the French demand that it control the demilitarisation of the Rhineland. The Young Plan and the evacuation of the Rhineland were basically complete at that point, but because the negotiations had taken considerably more time than planned, it was agreed that the remaining questions should be clarified at a second meeting.

== Second session ==
The second part of the Hague Conference took place from 3 to 20 January 1930. Issues of a mostly technical nature were clarified, specifically the establishment of the Bank for International Settlements, which was to replace the Agent General for Reparations Seymour Parker Gilbert; the question of whether creditors could continue to impose sanctions in the event of a German default as provided for in the Treaty of Versailles; and the mobilisation of a first tranche of reparations.

Between the two sessions, the New York stock market had crashed (24 October 1929), making it apparent that the American capital market would be unable for the foreseeable future to pre-finance the entire value of the German reparations debt for the European creditor powers as had originally been discussed. Pre-financing would have allowed Germany to pay off its reparations in a lump sum, and Britain, France and the other countries that had borrowed money from the United States in 1917 and 1918 could then pay their war debts to the US with a single payment. The new French prime minister, André Tardieu, insisted that as large a portion as possible be mobilised and thus made immediately available to France. In order to interest the Germans in mobilising the reparations, he proposed that part of the Young bond, as the new financial product was called, be paid out to Germany. Since the government of Hermann Müller had chronic problems balancing the budget, it agreed. In the Young bond, $200 million in reparations were pooled with $100 million for Germany. This, and the fact that another foreign bond of the German government was included in the treaty, made its creditworthiness abroad closely linked to punctual payment of reparations. At the same time, the new foreign minister, Julius Curtius, had to solemnly affirm the finality of the Young Plan and promise that Germany would not make light use of the possibilities to postpone reparations payments.

In the previous negotiations, it had remained open when the German government had to transfer the monthly payments. While the Germans wanted to pay at the end of the month, the creditor powers unanimously insisted that payments be made in the second week. Calculated over the entire term of the Young Plan, it meant a loss of interest for the German side and thus an increase in costs by 80 million Reichsmarks. Curtius nevertheless agreed.

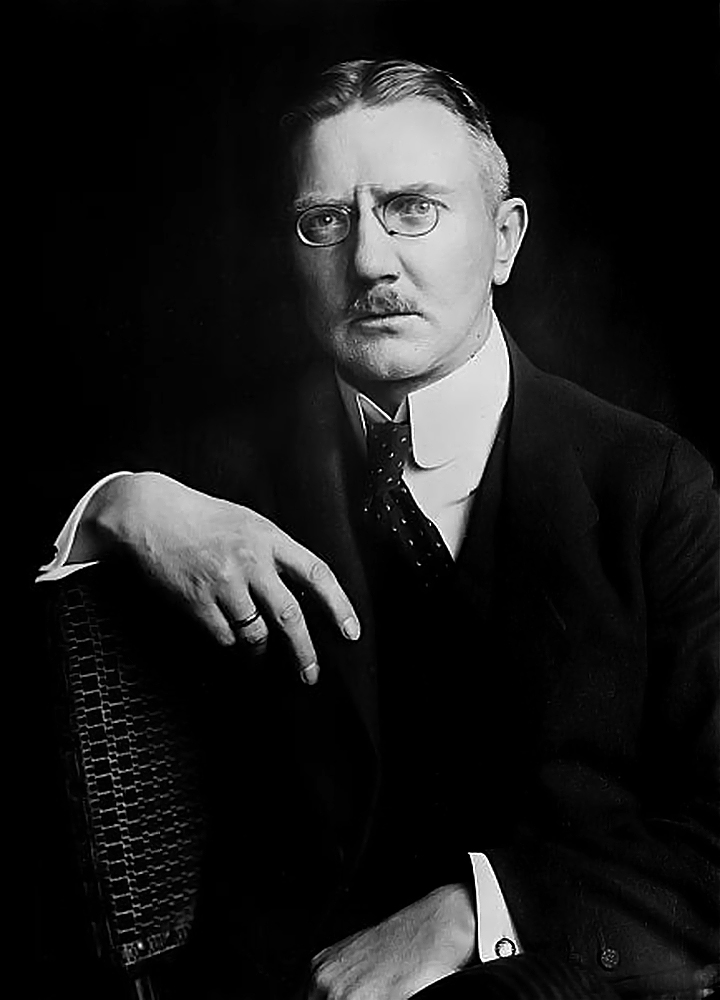
Reichsbank President Hjalmar Schacht, whose opposition to German concessions at the conference created ill-will

Hjalmar Schacht, the head of the Reichsbank, was furious. He considered the Young Plan as it had been negotiated in Paris beyond Germany's capacity. After it had been made even more disadvantageous to Germany at the first Hague discussions, he began opposing the German government and blocked a foreign loan that Finance Minister Hilferding needed to cover gaps in the budget. Foreign Minister Curtius nevertheless brought him into the German delegation to help set up the Bank for International Settlements. When Schacht learned that Germany had compromised once again, he demanded that the new bank be established under his responsibility. The organising committee was compelled to temporarily stop its work because of Schacht, and he had to be forced by the ministers to cooperate constructively. Even after he had begun to do so, the spectacle he had created damaged the confidence of the creditor powers, especially France, in Germany's willingness to pay.

The French public's lack of confidence in Germany was the reason for the long and thorny negotiations on the sanctions issue. Tardieu said that having the item on the agenda was "necessary [only] because parliamentarism exists". A compromise was eventually agreed on under which the creditor powers would regain their "full freedom of action" if the International Court of Justice found that Germany was in the process of "tearing up" the Young Plan. The phrasing could be interpreted differently by each of the states involved. The French read into it the chance to fall back on the robust sanction possibilities of the Versailles Treaty, while the Germans recognised in it merely the freedom of action to which every sovereign state is entitled under international law. After the sanctions question had also been settled, the "New Plan", as the Young Plan was officially called, and the agreement on the evacuation of the Rhineland were signed by the heads of government of the six powers on 20 January 1930. In doing so, they expressed their hope that "in the near future the consequences of the World War can be regarded as settled."

== Aftermath ==
The occupation of the Rhineland formally ended on 30 June 1930, five years earlier than required by the Treaty of Versailles.

The world-wide financial crisis that followed the Wall Street crash made it impossible for Germany to meet the reparations payments set up in the Young Plan. In 1931 President Herbert Hoover of the United States convinced 15 other nations to participate in a one year moratorium on reparations and war debt payments. The agreement reached in the 1932 Lausanne Conference for a final German payment of 3 billion gold marks was never ratified and was the last attempt during the Weimar Republic to regulate German reparations. Nothing more was paid until after the 1953 London Agreement on German External Debts. Germany paid off the last of its First World War debts in 2010.

== Literature ==
- Anglo-American Relations in the 1920s: The Struggle for Supremacy, B.J.C. McKercher, 1991
- The End of the European Era: 1890 to the Present, Gilbert & Large, 2002
- 1929, The Year of the Great Crash, William K. Klingaman, 1989
