= Hedwig Maier-Reimer =

German lawyer

Hedwig Maier (January 20, 1905, in Berlin – July 4, 2006, in Hamburg) was a German lawyer. Hedwig Maier received her doctorate in 1937 at the University of Berlin, she was later until her retirement the director of the district court Tübingen. From 1969 to 1979, she belonged to the International Arbitration Court in Koblenz, which had to negotiate international claims against the Federal Republic of Germany from the First World War, the Young Plan of 1929 and the London Debt Agreement of 1953, from 1959 to 1970, she was also a member of the voluntary film self-control in Wiesbaden.
