= 1929 German Young Plan referendum =

Failed vote against a war reparations agreement

- 22 December 1929
- Against the Enslavement of the German People (Freedom Act)
- Outcome: Not passed

Results
Choice	Votes	%
For	5,838,890	94.53%
Against	338,195	5.47%
Valid votes	6,177,085	97.92%
Invalid or blank votes	131,493	2.08%
Total votes	6,308,578	100.00%
Registered voters/turnout	42,323,473	14.91%
- Results by district and independent city. Black lines delineate states and Prussian provinces.

A referendum on the Young Plan was held in Germany on 22 December 1929. It was an attempt to use popular legislation to annul the Young Plan agreement between the German government and the World War I opponents of the German Empire regarding the amount and conditions of reparations payments. The referendum was the result of the initiative "Against the Enslavement of the German People (Freedom Act)" launched in 1929 by right-wing parties and organizations. It called for an overall revision of the Treaty of Versailles and stipulated that government officials who accepted new reparation obligations would be committing treason.

Eligible voters had from 16 to 29 October to sign the initiative and register their support for the draft Freedom Act. With just over 10% of those eligible to vote signing, the minimum requirement to pass the initiative was narrowly met. The German Reichstag debated the draft on 29 and 30 November, and it was rejected by a majority of deputies. The initiators then requested a referendum, which took place on 22 December. Since the Reich government had judged the Freedom Act to be unconstitutional, the decision required approval by a majority of all those eligible to vote instead of just the votes cast. Even though 94.5% of those voting supported the referendum, it failed due to the low turnout of just under 15% of eligible voters.

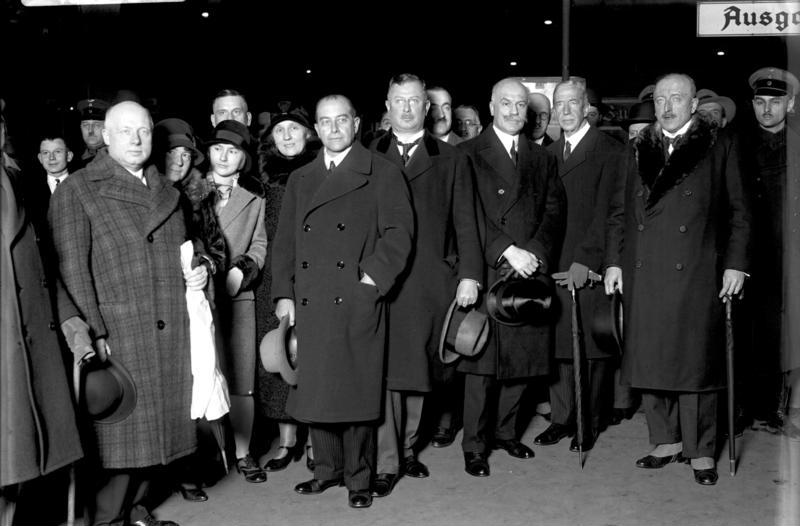
The German delegation at the second Hague Conference: Reich Finance Minister Paul Moldenhauer, Reich Foreign Minister Julius Curtius, Minister for the Occupied Territory Joseph Wirth, far right State Secretary in the Foreign Ministry Carl von Schubert.

The initiative and referendum were nevertheless significant for the political development of the following years. The propaganda campaign led by the political right was one of the largest of its kind during the Weimar Republic, and the government responded with considerable counter-propaganda. For the first time the traditional right, such as the German National People's Party (DNVP), acted together with the Nazi Party (NSDAP). The significance that the referendum had for the rise of Adolf Hitler and the Nazi party is disputed historically.

== Young Plan ==
One of the problems that weighed most heavily on the Weimar Republic's domestic politics was the reparations that the German Reich had to pay under Article 231 of the Treaty of Versailles as a result of its defeat in World War I. There were repeated foreign policy disputes between Germany and the victorious powers over the amount of the payments, which had first been set at 132 billion gold marks in the London Payment Plan of 1921. When Germany failed to meet its payment obligations in 1923, French and Belgian troops occupied the Ruhr, in part to take reparations payments in goods such as coal. In 1924 international commissions of experts examined Germany's economic strength and drew up proposals for the payment of reparations. The results were the Dawes Plan and the London Agreement of 1924, which for the first time led to regular German payments.

For what was intended to be a final settlement of the reparations question, another international commission of experts drafted the Young Plan (named after American industrialist Owen D. Young) in Paris between February and June 1929. At two government-level international conferences in The Hague in August 1929 and January 1930, the amount of German reparation debt was reduced to the equivalent of 36 billion Reichsmarks. The annual payments were lower than in the Dawes Plan, but they were to run until 1988. It was nevertheless to Germany's advantage that the reparations commission and all international economic controls were eliminated, giving the country back a large share of its sovereignty. In addition, acceptance of the plan meant that the Rhineland, occupied by Allied troops since 1920, would be vacated ahead of schedule. The government highlighted these advantages in its disputes with its opponents. Particular emphasis was placed on the lower payments and the resulting relief to the Reich budget. The Young Plan is considered the last success of the policy of rapprochement of Foreign Minister Gustav Stresemann of the German People's Party (DVP), who died before its final adoption on 3 October 1929.

== Domestic controversy ==
Domestic political disputes about the Young Plan began in the summer of 1929. Much of the public was appalled by the long duration and the total amount of payments to which Germany had committed itself. The sum of all annual payments came to 115 billion Reichsmarks, and since total Reich revenue in the fiscal year 1929–30 was 7.73 billion Reichsmarks, the figure seemed very high. The political right was able to make use of the agreement for propaganda purposes. It conjured up the image of grandsons up to their necks in debt at birth. The fight against the Young Plan offered itself as a point around which the divided right wing could crystallize in order to be able to strike out at the hated system of the "November criminals" – the government leaders who had signed the Armistice of 11 November 1918.

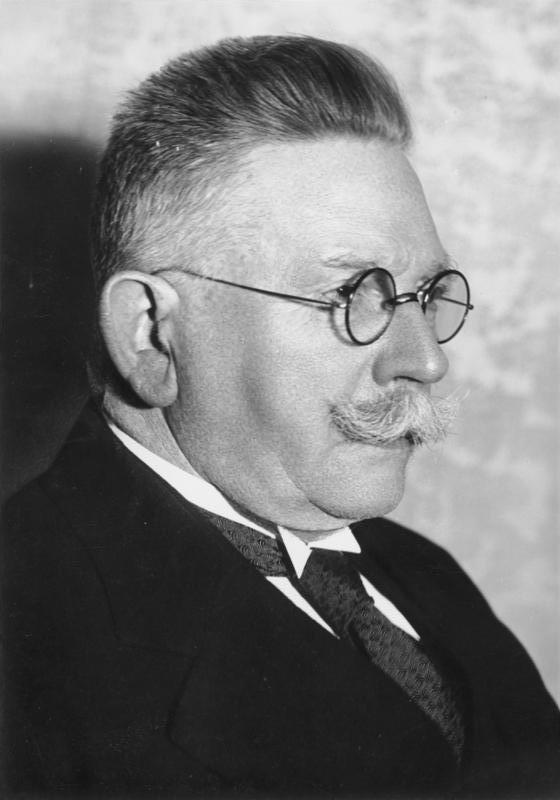
Alfred Hugenberg was the driving force for the alliance of the right against the Young Plan.

Representatives of agriculture and heavy industry in particular opposed the plans. The Reich Committee of German Agriculture called them economically unacceptable. The Association for the Protection of Common Economic Interests in the Rhineland and Westphalia passed a resolution claiming that the Young Plan would impose "unbearable burdens" on the German economy. Industry's opposition was, however, by no means unanimous. It was primarily heavy industry that opposed the Young Plan. In the business community as a whole, approval tended to dominate since the plan was associated with financial relief.

Alfred Hugenberg, a media baron and chairman of the German National People's Party (DNVP), had led the party on a radical course against the Weimar Republic after the party's losses in the 1928 Reichstag elections. In January 1929 Hugenberg was seeking to rally the political right, and the fight against the Young Plan seemed a likely means to do so. At the same time he was leading an intra-party conflict to bring the German nationalist Reichstag faction under Kuno von Westarp under his control. Hugenberg controlled a large number of newspapers and news services, including Germany's most important film company, UFA. Through them he had a strong influence on the formation of public opinion.

== Reich Committee for the initiative ==
In June 1929 Hugenberg put together a "Reich Committee for the German People's Initiative against the Young Plan and the War Guilt Lie". The first meeting was attended by Heinrich Class of the Pan-German League, Franz Seldte of the Stahlhelm, a veterans' association closely associated with the DNVP, Martin Schiele (DNVP) and Karl Hepp (CNBLP/DVP) for the Agricultural League, and, thanks to Hugenberg's invitation, Adolf Hitler of the NSDAP. Hugenberg admired the Nazis' dynamism and youthful enthusiasm and hoped to use them as a 'drum' in the campaign against the Young Plan. The Reich Committee also included Fritz Thyssen of the Reich Association of German Industry, and the industrialist and co-founder of the German People's Party (DVP) Albert Vögler, who had participated in the expert consultations at the Paris conference but had resigned in protest.

At the first meeting, a working committee (presidium) of 16 people was elected, among them Adolf Hitler. In addition to the leading representatives mentioned above, the presidium included members of the participating political parties. The actual tone, however, was set by the two chairmen of the executive committee, Seldte and Hugenberg. The committee was financed primarily by businesses. The Reich Committee divided the funds among the parties and organizations involved. There is no evidence of favoritism towards the NSDAP as some have claimed.

The goal was not just to prevent the Young Plan's reparations clauses from being implemented. They believed that accepting the Young Plan meant confessing to the 'war guilt clause', which had not been modified under the Young Plan, and wanted to explicitly reject it. In addition they wished to topple the government led by Hermann Müller of the Social Democratic Party (SPD) and to hold new elections. The course of action did not meet with everyone's approval even in the Reich Committee's more conservative camp. Paul Reusch, one of the leading figures in the Ruhrlade, a group of twelve leading industries from the Ruhr area, called the initiative "profoundly stupid" because, like large sections of German industry, his association rejected the Young Plan and had no interest at the time in new elections or a political crisis.

== Reich Committee and the NSDAP ==
After Hitler's failed 1923 Beer Hall Putsch, the German National People's Party (DNVP) had severed its ties to the National Socialists until Hugenberg restored them by including the NSDAP in the Reich Referendum Committee. Although he was fundamentally opposed to democracy and against popular legislation, Hitler participated because he expected political advantages from it. Until then he had been regarded as a Bavarian beer hall bigwig (bayerische Bierkellergröße) who headed a comparatively insignificant party with just twelve seats in the Reichstag and whose members were regarded as bullies. Now he sat with recognized leaders of the bourgeois right and played a role at the Reich level. Participation in the Reich Committee was for Hitler a great success.

In the NSDAP's own ranks, especially in the circles around Gregor and Otto Strasser, associating with the conservative right was controversial. Joseph Goebbels noted in his diary: "Under the appeal are names! Oh my God! In Hitler's case one can only say: it hurts my soul to see you in such society." He saw the collaboration as compromising. Hitler too had reservations. The cooperation, as the historian Otmar Jung points out, was not on Hitler's part based on sympathy with the conservative right but was rather purely tactical.

== Freedom Act ==
By means of the initiative and the subsequent referendum, the political right made use of the particularly progressive plebiscite elements of the Weimar Constitution. According to Article 73, an initiative was successful if at least 10% of those entitled to vote approved it. The Reich Committee's relationship to the people's legislative power was purely a means to pursue an aim. Franz Seldte made this clear in a speech on 26 October: "The initiative is only a means of struggle. Whether we get 3 million or 6 million [votes], we are ready and determined to continue the struggle with new weapons."

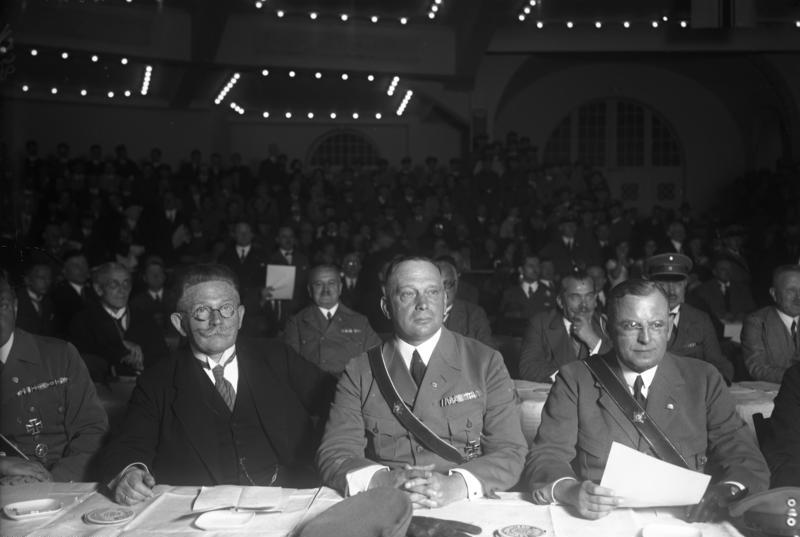
Hugenberg and Stahlhelm leaders Franz von Stephani and Franz Seldte at a rally for the referendum in the Berlin Sportpalast.

On 28 September 1929 the Reich Committee for the initiative against the Young plan submitted a bill to the Reich ministry of the interior that both the right wing of the DNVP around Hugenberg and the NSDAP had been involved in drafting. It stipulated that it was to be put to a popular vote if the Reichstag rejected it. Reich Minister of the Interior Carl Severing (SPD) allowed the proposal to go forward in spite of reservations from within his own party. He assumed that a refusal would only play into the hands of the right wing and that the initiative drive would likely fail. The draft was entitled: "Law Against the Enslavement of the German People". In its abbreviated form it was called propagandistically the "Freedom Law".

The draft was divided into four paragraphs and went beyond reparations issues in the narrow sense.

§1 rejected the recognition of war guilt.

§2 demanded the abrogation of the corresponding Article 231 in the Treaty of Versailles and the evacuation of the occupied territories.

§3 rejected accepting new reparation obligations.

§4 stated that "Reich Chancellors, Reich Ministers and their authorized representatives who sign treaties with foreign powers in contravention of the provisions of § 3, para. 1 shall be subject to the penalties provided for in § 92 No. 3 of the Criminal Code." The clause referred to treason, which was punishable by no less than two years in prison. Paragraph 4 in particular was included at Hitler's insistence.

The last paragraph was highly controversial even within the Reich Committee. Hugenberg and the Agricultural League found the passage embarrassing and wanted to dispense with it altogether, but the NSDAP made its continued participation conditional on retaining it. Hitler insisted on his position, and at the meeting of the Reich Committee on 21 September, the supporters of Section 4 prevailed. The clause was, however, made somewhat less provocative. In a first draft it would also have affected Reich President Paul von Hindenburg. While Joseph Goebbels and other National Socialists would have had no objection to including Hindenburg, the conservative members of the Reich Committee saw things differently. The wording was therefore changed to exclude the Reich President. Hindenburg nevertheless still refused to support the goals of the initiative. He rejected any connection with it and forbade using him or his name in the campaign. As a result, Hugenberg's propaganda was also directed against the head of state. Hindenburg was called senile and it was claimed that he was a tool of the left and had no will of his own.

== Propaganda of the right-wing parties ==
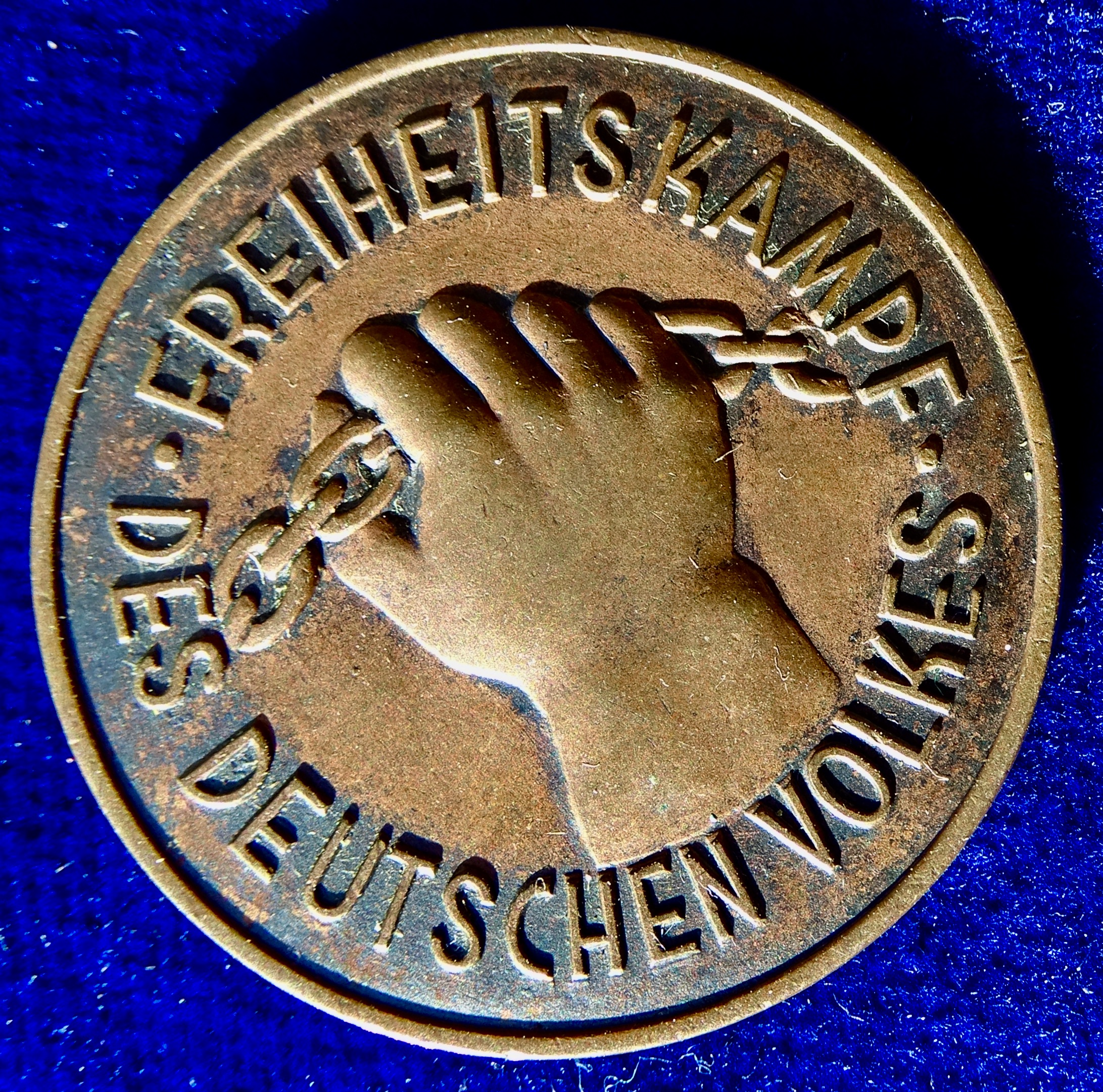
Referendum campaign medal against the Young Plan. The inscription reads "Freedom Fight of the German People".

The right-wing parties made forceful use of propaganda to canvass for voters to take part in the initiative. One particularly effective slogan was: "To the third generation you must labor", using the German word fronen, referring to unpaid labor for a feudal lord. The Reich Committee established a regular press service and published the series "Away with the Paris Tribute". They also used such normal advertising media as posters and leaflets but relied primarily on the Hugenberg press. Relatively new was the use of advertising films in the cinema for political propaganda.

Hugenberg gave a speech every other day and visited numerous cities throughout Germany during the first two weeks of the registration period. Goebbels was similarly active, while Hitler made only a few public appearances. The NSDAP held 7,000 meetings in October and often attracted unexpectedly large audiences. However, the campaign against the Young Plan overlapped with various state and local elections, and they were the priority for the party.

In addition to the Reich Committee there were local committees that were active in varying degrees. Noteworthy was a large rally that took place on 1 September at the Hermann Monument near Detmold.

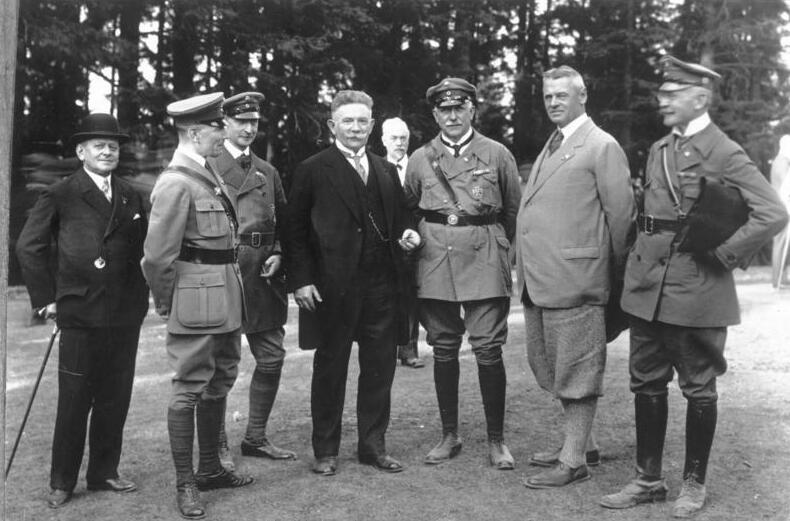
Participants in a rally for the initiative at the Hermann Monument on 1 September. In the center, Alfred Hugenberg (in frock coat).

The committees used sometimes absurd conspiracy theories, such as claiming that the government could not have published all the provisions of the Versailles Treaty. There were rumors of "German citizens who would have to be sold abroad as something like wage slaves to work in the creditor states' colonies". The criticism of Versailles was also combined with anti-Semitic allegations and included completely false allegations such as claiming that the unmarried former Reich Chancellor Joseph Wirth was married to a Jewess.

Gustav Stresemann was defamed "as the epitome of all the dangerous tendencies of our nation ... whose psychological decadence is clearly derived from his political decadence." The NSDAP in particular pushed its position to the extreme during the period leading up to the initiative. In the "New Front" published in the Ruhr area it said "that the National Socialist struggle against Stresemann would not stop at his grave!" At the 1929 Reich Party Congress, it introduced the concept of the "Un-German". "The initiative creates ... two categories [of people]; the one that believes in a German future, the Germans, and the other that for some reason is against it, the Un-Germans." The extreme positions of the NSDAP and also of Hugenberg led to conflicts within the Reich Committee. There were also forces within the DNVP that were increasingly skeptical of the matter. Some of the original supporters, such as the Agricultural League, turned away. The Young German Order and even leading members of the former Freikorps also opposed the initiative. Captain Hermann Ehrhardt, former leader of the violent Organisation Consul, called the action "a nonsensical prank" which would ultimately prove counterproductive for the nationalist camp.

== Countermeasures by the government ==
Initially the Reich government was forced by the ongoing negotiations in The Hague concerning the Young Plan to act with restraint. The political situation of Hermann Müller's 5-party coalition was difficult, and it left the field open to the agitation of opponents of the Young Plan. Only after the first Hague conference in August 1929 did the government begin its countermeasures. It employed the United Press Department of the Reich government and of the Foreign Office. Above all, the Reich Agency for Homeland Service played a major role. The departments at the state level were instructed to pay special attention to the Young Plan. In addition, the government set up a special press office. In view of the strong position of the Hugenberg press, it had only limited success.

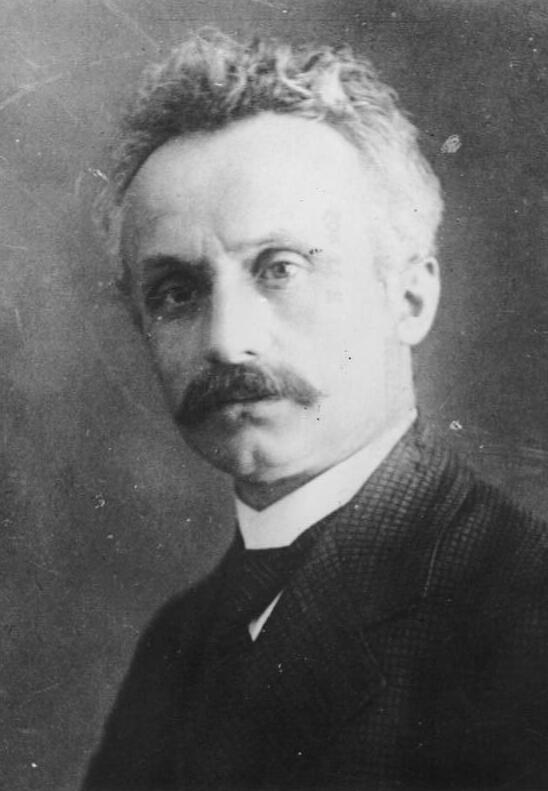
Carl Severing was seen by the public as the most outspoken opponent of the campaign.

The period during which voters could register on the appropriate lists lasted from 16 to 29 October. The Reich government spent a considerable amount of money on counter-propaganda. In September 1929 the plan was to harness the parties, trade unions and other organizations close to the government. The hope was for a thousand speakers from these groups and expenses of 250,000 Reichsmarks. Total costs of 400,000 Reichsmarks were expected, some of which came out of the budgets of the Foreign Office and the Reich Chancellery, but most of the money came unbudgeted from the Ministry of Finance under Rudolf Hilferding (SPD). The state government of Prussia also joined the effort. In addition to speeches and print media, radio and film were used for counter-propaganda. The use of radio, which was state controlled but had been relatively apolitical until then, met with criticism even among government supporters. In contrast, Reich Minister of the Interior Carl Severing (SPD) saw radio as a crucial propaganda tool. Stations were required to broadcast so-called "instructional discussions" (Auflagevorträge) unchanged. A total of six were put on the air during the registration period. At some stations there was noticeable interference, but suspicions of sabotage could not be proven.

Prussian civil servants were forbidden to take part in the initiative and could face disciplinary action if they failed to comply. The DNVP brought a legal action against the policy. The Prussian State Court initially rejected the motion, but in the final decision, which was issued only after the election, the court recognized the right of civil servants to participate in a legal initiative. Only active advocacy of the goals could be construed as official misconduct.

The parties in the government coalition were comparatively restrained. The DVP, the party of the late Gustav Stresemann, fought most strongly against the initiative. Shortly before his death he ruled out cooperation between the DVP and the Hugenberg-led DNVP on the grounds of the upcoming initiative. The refusal, however, narrowed the party's political room to maneuver: "I see that we have to go with the left, because parts of the right in Germany have gone crazy." The position did not last long after Stresemann's death. Instead the party swung to the right.

Severing took the clearest position against the initiative, with the result that the public saw the dispute as a battle between Severing and Hugenberg. Severing initiated a public appeal by the Reich government entitled "To the German People". In it the content of the initiative was described as an "attempt at the worst kind of incitement of the people". It declared its support for the Republic and for Stresemann's policy of rapprochement. The appeal was signed by influential public figures, among them the economist and banker Hjalmar Schacht, industrialist Robert Bosch, physicists Albert Einstein and Max Planck, and the writers Gerhart Hauptmann and Thomas Mann. Others such as entrepreneur Carl Friedrich von Siemens, independent politician Hans Luther and industrialist Carl Duisberg refused to sign.

== Reichstag debate on the Freedom Act ==
Results of the petition by district and independent city. Black lines delineate states and Prussian provinces.

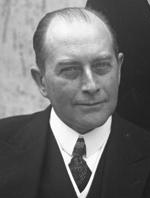
Julius Curtius in 1930.

By the end of the registration period on 29 October, 10.02% of eligible voters had entered their names on the lists, 0.02 percentage points more than was needed for the initiative to succeed. The Reich Committee was most successful in Germany's eastern states. East Prussia, Pomerania and Mecklenburg alone accounted for three quarters of all votes.

In accordance with the provisions of the constitution, the bill was debated in the Reichstag on 29 November. The Reich Committee submitted an explanatory statement on the Freedom Act in which it once again presented its views.

Foreign Minister Julius Curtius of the DVP spoke for the government in Severing's stead. The government wanted to make it clear that the dispute would not be a fight between Severing and Hugenberg or of a Marxist and an anti-Marxist. Curtius accused the originators of the initiative of "throwing the constitutional order and separation of the Reich's political powers into complete disarray". The campaign, he said, was "an attack against the authority of the state". Speaking for the DNVP was not Hugenberg, who had not spoken in parliament for nine years, but Ernst Oberfohren and Axel von Freytagh-Loringhoven. Gottfried Feder spoke for the NSDAP. During the debate a representative of the NSDAP made it clear that the party's participation in the initiative was a matter of the "abolition of the system by legal means". The position of the governing parties was presented by Thomas Esser of the Catholic Centre Party. He emphasized that the initiative wanted to replace "a policy of negotiation and understanding" with one "of sabotage and provocation". "It creates the illusion that Germany can, by mere protest, throw off the burden of war reparations and all at once completely liberate the Rhineland and the Saar region."

As expected, on 30 November parliament rejected the bill by a large majority on its second reading. Hugenberg did not have all members of the DNVP behind him in the vote. While they approved the first three paragraphs of the bill, it was not the same with the fourth paragraph which spoke of treason charges against ministers. Of 72 DNVP members, only 52 voted yes. Hugenberg's intra-party critics around chairman Kuno von Westarp accused him of pushing a policy that exacerbated antagonisms and made cooperation with other middle-class parties impossible. The threat of punishment in paragraph 4 of the Freedom Act hitched the party "to the wagon of the National Socialists", whose methods of agitation they rejected just as much as they did their social and economic policy demands. As a result, Hugenberg acted sharply against the dissenters, a move that contributed to a split in the party. Westarp resigned, and some dissenters founded the "German National Association". This gave rise to the short-lived Conservative People's Party.

== The path to the referendum ==
The initiators now applied for a referendum to be held. The Reich government deliberately set the date for it on 22 December, the last Sunday before Christmas, in order to keep the number of people voting low. The referendum's sponsors again stepped up their propaganda. They were able to exploit statements critical of the government made by Reichsbank President Hjalmar Schacht as well as the state court ruling that allowed civil servants to participate in the vote. In contrast, opponents of the referendum scarcely addressed the issue.

The Reich government judged the bill behind the referendum to be unconstitutional, which meant that adoption of the bill would require amendments to the constitution. Passing the referendum therefore required the approval of more than 50% of those eligible to vote, whereas if the bill that had been constitutional, a majority of those voting would have sufficed. As it turned out, only 13.8% of eligible voters approved the referendum, barely more than in the initiative. Thus the right-wing parties' campaign failed to reach its goal. Overall, a comparison with the 1930 Reichstag election shows that there were correlations between a high approval rating for the referendum and a particularly strong showing by the NSDAP.

On 12 March 1930 the Reichstag ratified the Young Plan by a vote of 270 to 192.

== Consequences ==
The failure of the campaign seemed to show the Republic's remarkable stability. But the propaganda that for months had attempted to tarnish the reputation of parliamentary democracy permanently altered the political culture. Changes began to take place on the political right that ultimately led to the weakening of its more conservative forces in favor of the NSDAP. Just how unstable the Republic was became apparent only a few months later with the onset of the Great Depression, the subsequent rise of the NSDAP and the final erosion of parliamentary democracy.

One of Hugenberg's core goals was to use the campaign against the Young Plan to bring the political right together. This goal failed with the breakup of his own party and the founding of the People's Conservative Association, out of which grew the short-lived Conservative People's Party and the Christian Social People's Service. In the Reichstag election of 1930, the Protestant conservative right was fragmented, and the DNVP received only 7% of the vote. The party's closeness to the NSDAP, which had been emphasized during the campaign, made the formation of a middle-class bloc including the DNVP impossible. It marked the beginning of a development that contributed to the decline of the middle-class parties as a whole.

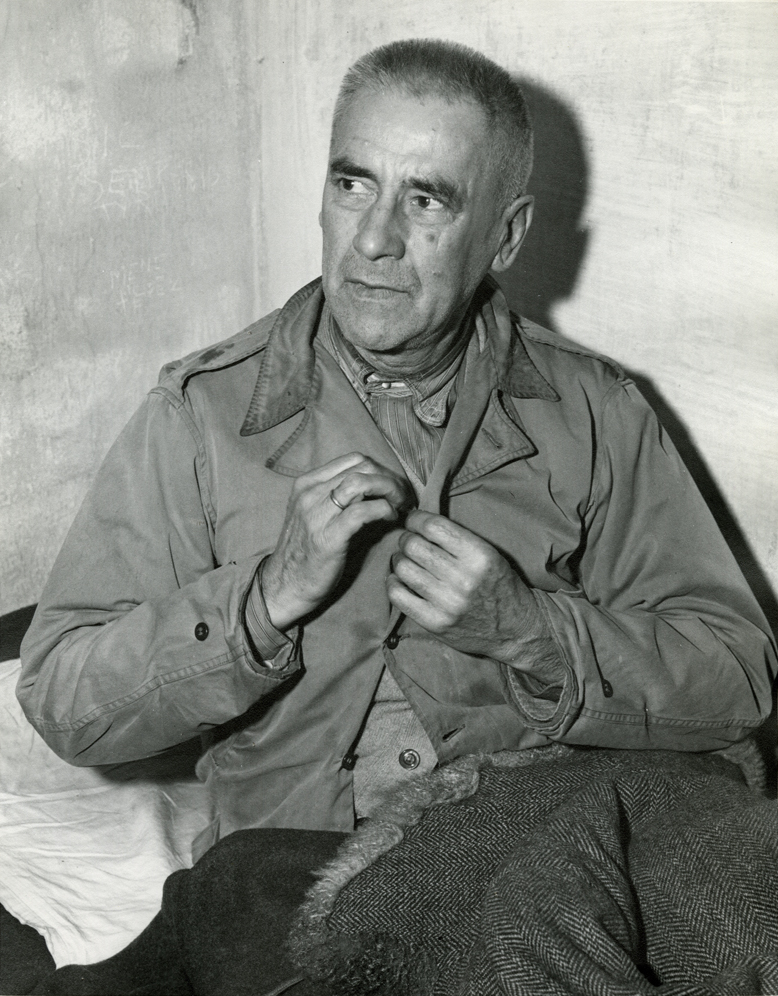
Wilhelm Frick in his cell during the Nuremberg trials in 1945.

In retrospect the NSDAP appears to have been the real winner. At the end of 1929 and the beginning of 1930, it made gains in the state parliamentary elections in Baden and Thuringia as well as in the civic elections in Lübeck. In January 1930 Wilhelm Frick in Thuringia became Germany's first NSDAP minister. In the 1930 Reichstag election, the party's representation increased from 2.6% to 18.3%.

With its participation in the Reich Committee, the NSDAP succeeded in breaking its previous political isolation. For the first time since 1923 Hitler played a significant role in German politics. A considerable body of research argues that Hitler's participation made him a potential alliance partner for the middle class political right. During the campaign and afterwards, the NSDAP received large amounts of money from industry, and that, the research says, played a significant role in the party's success in the Reichstag elections of 1930. In addition, the Hugenberg press was from then on at Hitler's disposal. The direct effect of the campaign on the rise of the NSDAP is, however, disputed. Historian Otmar Jung in particular warned against overestimating it. According to his view, participation in the referendum in itself played only a minor role in the rise of the NSDAP. Participation in the Reich Committee was associated with little money or additional propaganda opportunities for the party. Others do not see this so conclusively. According to Eberhard Kolb, the NSDAP was certainly able to draw on the financial resources of the Reich Committee. That made it possible for them, in the midst of the anti-Young Plan campaign, to organize the largest party congress to date with 200,000 participants and to uniform 20,000 SA men in September 1929. Historian Gerhard Schulz early on emphasized that Hitler had succeeded in shaping his cooperation in such a way that he did not come across as an opportunist and could continue to be seen as a revolutionary radical. The NSDAP became both a partner and a rival for the still powerful traditional right, especially the Stahlhelm. The party's strategy was to avoid permanent ties to other groups. On the other hand, it was open to short term alliances if they contributed to its own strengthening.

In light of the campaign against the Young Plan, Josef Stalin demanded in September 1929 that the Communist Party of Germany (KPD) take a fundamentally different position on the reparations issue. He saw the campaign as the key to the NSDAP's sudden success. There were still reservations in the Comintern about a turn towards a nationalist-populist position, but they ended in 1930 in the face of further successes by the NSDAP. In August of that year, the KPD newspaper Die Rote Fahne published a "Program Declaration for National and Social Liberation" in which the party used strongly nationalist language. The attempt to draw protest voters away from the NSDAP with national slogans failed. In the 1930 Reichstag election, the KPD barely made gains, while the NSDAP leapfrogged them by adding 95 seats.

== Results ==
Yes votes in referendum as percent of all eligible voters by district.

Although 94.5% of valid votes were cast in favor of the proposal, voter turnout was only 15%, well below the 50% requirement, rendering the vote null.

Choice	Votes	%
For	5,838,890	94.53
Against	338,195	5.47
Total	6,177,085	100.00
Valid votes	6,177,085	97.92
Invalid/blank votes	131,493	2.08
Total votes	6,308,578	100.00
Registered voters/turnout	42,323,473	14.91
Source: Nohlen & Stöver

== Text of the proposed law ==
Entwurf eines Gesetzes gegen die Versklavung des deutschen Volkes
Draft Law against the Enslavement of the German People
§1 Die Reichsregierung hat den auswärtigen Mächten unverzüglich in feierlicher Form Kenntnis davon zu geben, daß das erzwungene Kriegsschuldanerkenntnis des Versailler Vertrags der geschichtlichen Wahrheit widerspricht, auf falschen Voraussetzungen beruht und völkerrechtlich unverbindlich ist.
§1 The Reich government shall immediately inform the foreign powers in a solemn manner that the forced acknowledgement of war guilt of the Treaty of Versailles contradicts the historical truth, is based on false premises and is not binding under international law.
§2 Die Reichsregierung hat darauf hinzuwirken, daß das Kriegsschuld-anerkenntnis des Art. 231 sowie die Art. 429 und 430 des Versailler Vertrags förmlich außer Kraft gesetzt werden.

Sie hat ferner darauf hinzuwirken, daß die besetzten Gebiete nunmehr unverzüglich und bedingungslos, sowie unter Ausschluß jeder Kontrolle über deutsches Gebiet geräumt werden, unabhängig von Annahme oder Ablehnung der Beschlüsse der Haager Konferenz.

§2 The Reich government shall endeavor to ensure that the acknowledgement of war guilt under Article 231 and Articles 429 and 430 (Note: Article 231 is the so-called war guilt clause that assigned full responsibility for all of the Allies' war losses to Germany. Articles 429 and 430 deal with the occupation of the Rhineland.) of the Treaty of Versailles are formally repealed.

It must also work for the immediate and unconditional evacuation of the occupied territories, and for the exclusion of any control over German territory, irrespective of the acceptance or rejection of the decisions of the Hague Conference.

§3 Auswärtigen Mächten gegenüber dürfen neue Lasten und Verpflichtungen nicht übernommen werden, die auf dem Kriegsschuldanerkenntnis beruhen.

Hierunter fallen auch die Lasten und Verpflichtungen, die auf Grund der Vorschläge der Pariser Sachverständigen und nach den daraus hervorgehenden Vereinbarungen von Deutschland übernommen werden sollen.

§3 No new burdens and obligations based on the acknowledgement of war guilt may be assumed with respect to foreign powers.

This also includes the burdens and obligations to be assumed by Germany on the basis of the proposals of the Paris experts and according to the agreements resulting from them.

§4 Reichskanzler, Reichsminister und deren Bevollmächtigte, die entgegen der Vorschrift des § 3 Abs. 1 Verträge mit auswärtigen Mächten zeichnen, unterliegen den im § 92 Nr. 3 StGB, vorgesehenen Strafen.
§4 Reich Chancellors, Reich Ministers and their authorized representatives who sign treaties with foreign powers in contravention of the provisions of § 3, para. 1 shall be subject to the penalties provided for in § 92 No. 3 of the Criminal Code. (Note: §92 No. 3 of the Criminal Code referred to treason, which was punishable by no less than two years in prison.)
§5 Dieses Gesetz tritt mit seiner Verkündung in Kraft.
§5 This Law shall enter into force upon its promulgation.

== Bibliography ==
- Eyck, Erich, (1964), A History of the Weimar Republic, Volume II: From the Locarno Conference to Hitler's Seizure of Power, translated by Hanson, Harlan P. and Waite, Robert G.C, London: Oxford University Press.
- Kolb, Eberhard, (1988), The Weimar Republic, New York: Routledge.
- Nicholls, A.J, (2000), Weimar and the Rise of Hitler, London: MacMillan Press, Ltd.
