= London Agreement on German External Debts =

1953 debt relief treaty

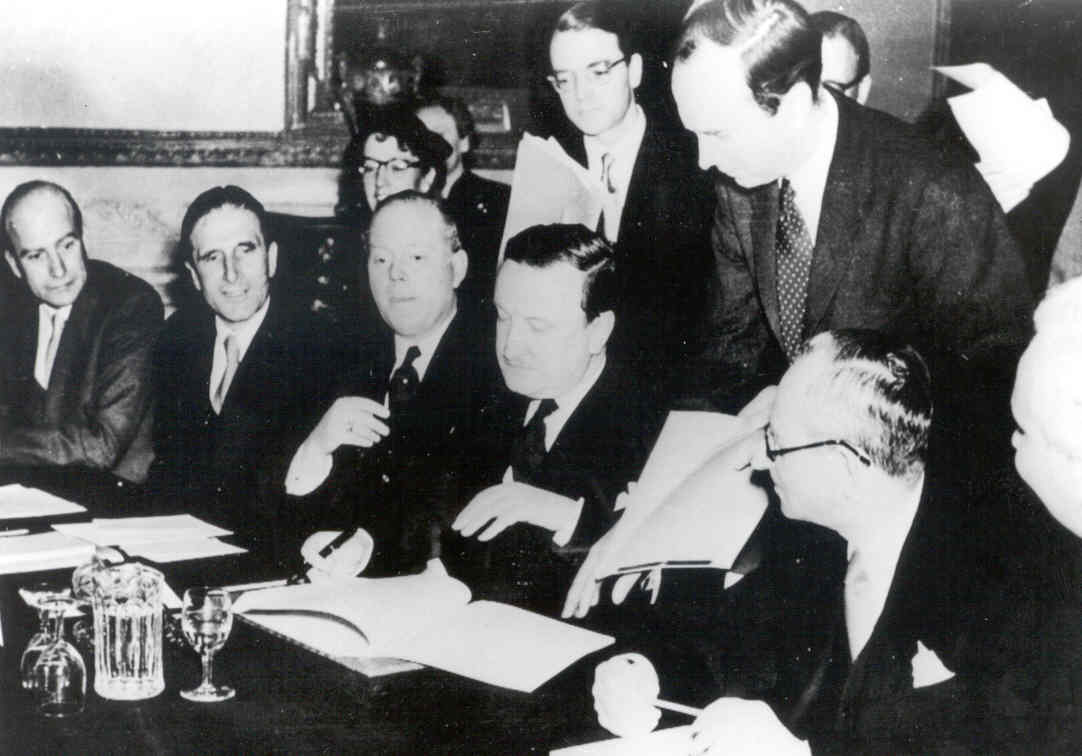
Hermann Josef Abs signing the London Agreement on German External Debts on 27 February 1953.

The London Agreement on German External Debts, also known as the London Debt Agreement (German: Londoner Schuldenabkommen), was a debt relief treaty between the Federal Republic of Germany and creditor nations. The Agreement was signed in London on 27 February 1953, and came into force on 16 September 1953.

== Overview ==
On 24 May 1951, the US and UK Departments of Foreign Affairs respectively, informed the Allied Countries involved in the settlement, about a new arrangement regarding Germany's External Debts. The content of the dispatch made the main points of discussion clear from the start. The dispatch contained the following texts.

4. The three Governments, in order to make an overall settlement of German debts possible, are prepared to modify the priority of their claims in respect of the post-war economic assistance which they furnished to Germany, on condition that the settlement plan is acceptable to them.
5. The arrangements contemplated relate to Germany's pre-war public and private indebtedness and to the German debt arising out of post-war economic assistance; they do not relate to claims arising out of the war which can only be dealt with in connexion with a peace treaty.

In response to the Allies, Adenauer informed them about Germany’s desire to repay its debts. The Conference on German External Debts (also known as the London Debt Conference) was held between 28 February and 28 August 1952. The Agreement reached at the Conference was signed in London on 27 February 1953. The Agreement was ratified by the United States, France, and United Kingdom on 16 September 1953, at which point the agreement came into force. The Agreement was firstly turned down by the Bundestag and then approved on a following vote.

== Debts covered by the Agreement ==
The parties that were involved besides West Germany included Belgium, Canada, Ceylon, Denmark, France, Greece, Iran, Ireland, Italy, Liechtenstein, Luxembourg, Norway, Pakistan, Spain, Sweden, Switzerland, South Africa, the United Kingdom, the United States, and Yugoslavia. The states of the Eastern Bloc were not involved.

Some amounts owed by Germany arose from its efforts to pay war reparations, and others were associated with large scale loans by the United States. In total, 80 percent of Germany's external obligations were owed to the United States, the Netherlands, the United Kingdom, and Switzerland.

The Agreement covered loans arising from external investments due to the Dawes Plan, and loans from economic aid to Germany. The support was provided by two major programs, the GARIOA and the Marshall Plan.

Debts that would be settled by different arrangements were excluded from the London Agreement. Claims arising by countries damaged by Germany during World War II were not included. The debts to be settled by the London Agreement included:

- "non-contractual pecuniary obligations, the amount of which was fixed and due before May 8th 1945"
- "pecuniary obligations arising out of loan or credit contracts entered into before May 8th 1945"
- "pecuniary obligations arising out of contracts other than loan or credit contracts and due before May 8th 1945"

The Agreement was based on three important conditions. Firstly, the total amount that Germany was obligated to pay would be greatly reduced. The repayments' timeframe should be stretched long enough in order to help Germany's economy grow. Last but not least, the total that was supposed to be paid per year was associated with Germany's "ability to make transfers". It can be described as a broad based agreement as it settled just about every kind of German debt arising from the period before and after the Second World War.

The total under negotiation was 16 billion DM of debt resulting from the Treaty of Versailles after World War I which had not been paid in the 1930s, but which Germany decided to repay to restore its reputation. This money was owed to government and private banks in the U.S., France, and Britain. Another 16 billion marks represented postwar loans by the U.S. According to several commentators, the total of debts arising before World War II were 16.1 billion marks, while debts after the war were calculated to be 16.2 billion marks. Under the London Agreement, the repayable amount was reduced by 50% to about 15 billion marks and stretched out over 30 years, and compared to the fast-growing German economy were of minor impact. An important term of the agreement was that repayments were only due while West Germany ran a trade surplus, and that repayments were limited to 3% of export earnings. The amounts set by the Agreement were meant to be paid by the profit resulting from German exports, not from stockpile or new loaned amounts. This gave Germany's creditors a powerful incentive to import German goods, assisting reconstruction. After the settlement came into force, for the next five years, until 1958, Germany had to pay only debts arising from unpaid interest. This is another example of attempts made to help Germany's economy grow before starting to pay the owed amounts. This way, the Allies also acknowledged the willingness of Germany to compensate Israel.

After the five-year mark, Germany was under obligation to pay a fixed amount of 765 million marks per year. As time went by Germany's exports increased significantly, making fulfilment of payments a lot easier and reducing their negative effects on the economy. Debts covered by the Agreement were almost paid off during the 1970s. Germany continued to pay the fixed amount, a smaller and smaller relative burden on the treasury with each year, until the last payment was settled in 1983.

Part of the agreement concerned debts to be paid after the reunification of Germany. For many decades this seemed unlikely to transpire, but in 1990, DM 239.4 million in deferred interest became due. These claims were repaid by means of Fundierungsschuldverschreibungen (funding debt securities) with a maturity of 20 years. On 3 October 2010 the final payment of €69.9 million was made on these bonds, the last payment by Germany on known debts from both world wars.

== Negotiations ==
The negotiations started with the Allies creating a Commission. The Commission's key role was to determine the types of debts that would be addressed by the London Agreement. During the process, the two sides negotiated the terms of the Agreement “as equals”. The first conference was held in Bonn, in June 1951. The next conference was held in London in July 1951.

In February 1952 another conference occurred. This was the most essential moment of the entire negotiation process. The total amounts of debts and the compensations’ deadlines were the main topic of conversation. Germany’s negotiating skills played a huge role in the settlements’ outcome.

In the last parts of negotiations, some “intergovernmental debts” were settled and “detailed technical reports” were produced that were included in the London Agreement.

== Impact ==
The agreement significantly contributed to the growth of the post-war German economy and re-emergence of Germany as a world economic power. A 2018 study in the European Review of Economic History showed that the London Agreement "spurred economic growth in three main ways: creating fiscal space for public investment; lowering costs of borrowing; and stabilising inflation." It allowed Germany to enter international economic institutions such as the World Bank and the International Monetary Fund. Another study has shown that the London Agreement can be associated with a "rise in real per capita social expenditure in health, education, housing, and economic development". The stabilization of inflation was a major benefit for the German economy. West Germany's new currency, the Deutsche Mark, was highly unstable until 1953. After the signing of the agreement, it stabilized due to the debt relief. The transition of West Germany from a debtor to a creditor by the middle of the 1950s had an impact on Germany's economic growth as well. The agreement's outcome can be described as a German economic miracle. Germany achieved all of the above, despite being obligated to pay the total amount of war reparations (with interest) prior to the London Conference and despite the presence of an arbitral tribunal.

== See also ==
- German reparations for World War II
- Marshall Plan
- World War I reparations
- Dawes Plan, 1924–29
- Young Plan, 1930–32
- Hoover Moratorium stopped payments in 1931
