= Eberhard Kolb =

German historian

Professor Eberhard Kolb (born 8 August 1933, Stuttgart) is a German historian, best known for his research of the German history of the nineteenth and twentieth centuries.

== Biography ==
Eberhard Kolb studied at the universities of Tübingen and Bonn, and attained a doctorate 1960 at the University of Göttingen on the topic of the influence of workers' councils on German domestic politics.

He wrote his habilitation in 1969, and one year later became a professor of modern history at the University of Würzburg. He served as a professor at the University of Cologne from 1979 until his retirement in 1998. In 1981 he spent a year as a visiting professor at the Hebrew University of Jerusalem.

Professor Kolb has published books on Imperial Germany, the Weimar Republic, and the Third Reich. His summary of research on the Weimar Republic has been frequently revised and reissued since its publication in 1984, and was translated into English in 1988.

== Historical scientific work ==
=== Belsen ===
The Bergen-Belsen concentration camp plays a key role in Kolb's work. In 1959 he was a participant in the first study trip on behalf of the state government of Lower Saxony for political education to Israel. In 1960 he compiled a scientific presentation of the camp's history. Initiated by the government of Lower Saxony, it was the first official Belsen exhibition.

Kolb's monograph, "Bergen-Belsen", was published in 1962 in an abbreviated form. It is now in its sixth edition. A "document house" built in 1966 at Bergen-Belsen was conceived by Kolb, and in the 1980s he was instrumental in the redesign of the memorial, which opened in 1990.

=== Weimar Republic ===
Heinrich August Winkler describes Kolb as "one of the best authorities on the history of the Weimar Republic". Kolb wrote the book The Weimar Republic, which highlights problems and trends of the ongoing research, and gives an overview of the most important topics.

=== Memorial places ===
Kolb has sat continuously since 1998 as a member of the scientific advisory board of the Otto von Bismarck Foundation. In addition to being an active member, he is co-editor of the Neuen Friedrichsruher Ausgabe, a publication about Bismarck, his sons, and his employees. He sat as advisory chairman of German Chancellor Friedrich Ebert memorial place from 1990 to 2001. Besides his work at the Bergen-Belsen camp, he was involved in the development of the National Memorial at Buchenwald and the redevelopment of the concentration camp memorial at Neuengamme.

== Honours ==
In 1992 he was awarded the Order of Merit of Lower Saxony, and in 2004 received the Merit First Class of the Federal Republic of Germany.

== Works ==
- (in German) Thesis – Die Arbeiterräte in der deutschen Innenpolitik. 1918–1919. Thesis at the University of Göttingen, 1959; Ullstein Verlag, Frankfurt am Main / Berlin / Vienna 1978
- Bergen Belsen : Geschichte des "Aufenthaltslager" 1943-1945 [Bergen Belsen: History of the "Residence Camp" 1943-1945] (in German). Hannover: Verlag für Literatur und Zeitgeschehen. 1962. OCLC 2540600.
- Die Weimarer Republik [The Weimar Republic] (in German). München: Oldenbourg. 1984. ISBN 978-3-486-58870-5.
- Gustav Stresemann (in German). München: CH Beck. 2003. ISBN 3-406-48015-2.
- Der Frieden von Versailles [The Treaty of Versailles] (in German). München: CH Beck. 2005. ISBN 3-406-50875-8.
- Bismarck. München: CH Beck. 2009. ISBN 978-3-406-56276-1.
