= Young Plan =

1929 attempt to settle Germany's World War I reparations

The Young Plan was a 1929 attempt to settle issues surrounding the World War I reparations obligations that Germany owed under the terms of Treaty of Versailles. Developed to replace the 1924 Dawes Plan, the Young Plan was negotiated in Paris from February to June 1929 by a committee of international financial experts under the leadership of American businessman and economist Owen D. Young. Representatives of the affected governments then finalised and approved the plan at The Hague conference of 1929–30. Reparations were set at 36 billion Reichsmarks payable through 1988. Including interest, the total came to 112 billion Reichsmarks. The average annual payment was approximately two billion Reichsmarks (US$473 million in 1929). The plan came into effect on 17 May 1930, retroactive to 1 September 1929.

In a parallel agreement, France agreed to withdraw its troops from the occupied Rhineland in 1930, five years earlier than called for in the Treaty of Versailles.

Due to the effects of the Great Depression, the Young Plan was suspended by the Hoover Moratorium in June 1931 and payments reduced by 90% at the Lausanne conference in July 1932. The National Socialist government under Adolf Hitler made no payments after it came to power in 1933. However, Germany continued to pay interest on Dawes and Young bonds until 1939.

== Origins ==
=== Problems with the Dawes Plan ===
The Treaty of Versailles did not set the total amount or the terms for German reparations. It established an interim 20 billion Reichsmarks to be paid through April 1920 and left the full details to be determined by the Inter-Allied Reparations Commission. The Commission drew up the May 1921 London Schedule of Payments that fixed the total sum at 132 billion Reichsmarks. After Germany was declared in default in January 1923, French and Belgian troops occupied the Ruhr. Germany responded with passive resistance to the occupation, and the government's payments to the idled workers of the Ruhr fuelled the hyperinflation that nearly wrecked the economy. The Dawes Plan of 1924 was drafted to replace the London Schedule.

The Dawes Plan came into effect on 1 September 1924. It reopened the American capital market to Germany, and billions in long-term bonds and short-term loans flowed to the German private and public sectors in roughly equal parts. The economy of the Weimar Republic grew significantly during the Golden Twenties (1924–1929), and in spite of a negative trade balance, there was enough foreign exchange to pay the instalments of the plan. The payments came, however, at the price of a large foreign debt.

All sides began to be more uneasy about the plan from 1927 onwards. Wall Street banks and the United States Treasury grew increasingly concerned that Germany would become overindebted. Since 1924, foreign loans worth more than ten billion Reichsmarks had flowed into Germany. The question arose as to whether private loans or reparations should have priority in the event of a payment crisis.

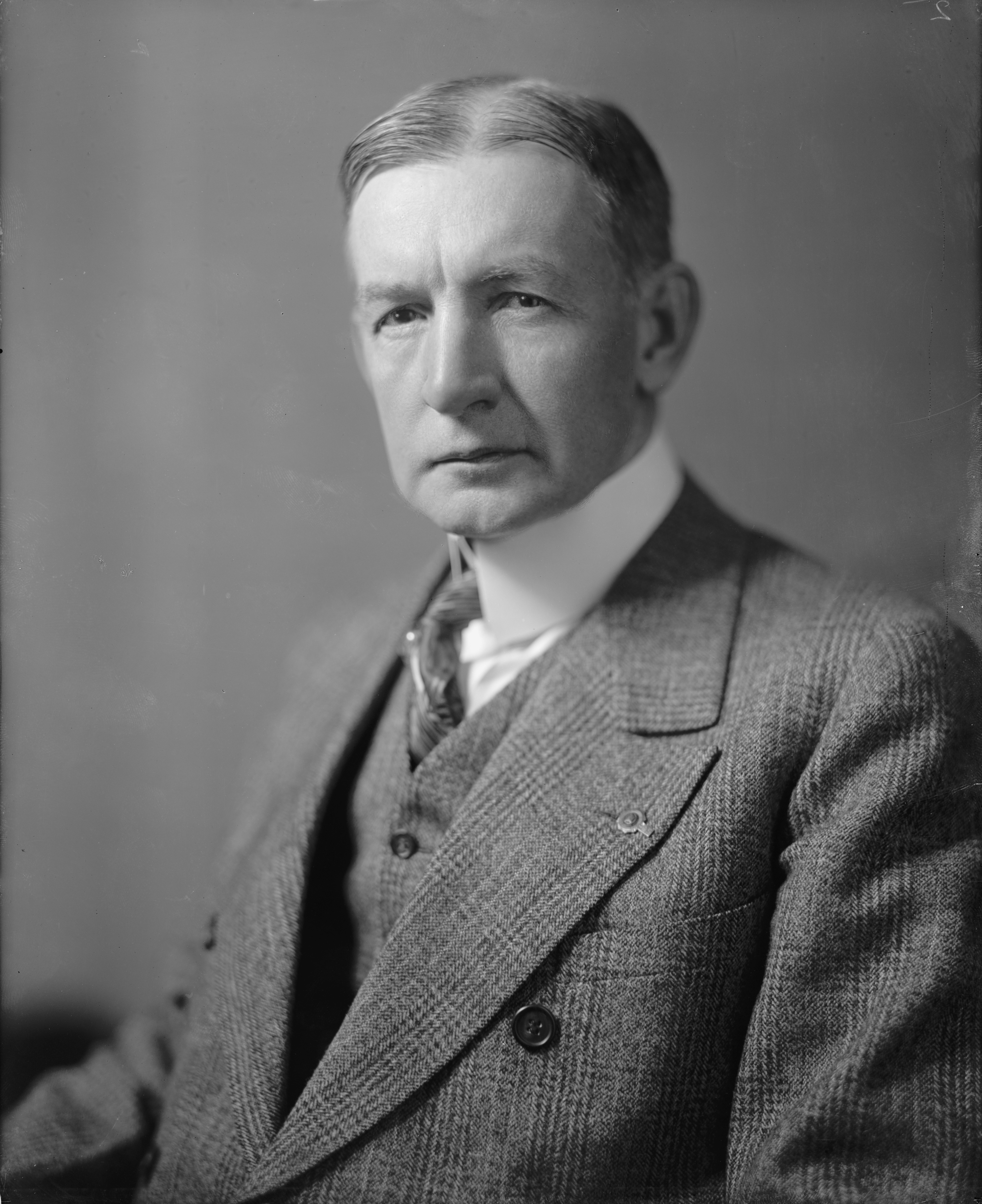
Charles Dawes, who led the committee that developed the Dawes Plan

The French government also became increasingly concerned. Since 1919 the United States had been calling for the repayment of the inter-allied war debts incurred by France in 1917 and 1918. France urgently needed loans to stabilise the franc after the inflation of 1924 and 1925, but the American capital market was closed to it as long as the war debt remained unpaid. The matter was settled with the Mellon–Berenger Agreement in April 1926 that established a schedule for French repayment to the United States. The French Chamber of Deputies, however, refused to ratify it until the German reparations issue was settled. Since the money from Germany was to be used for French payments to the United States, France became more willing to agree to a new reparations plan, even to settle for less than the 132 billion gold marks demanded in the 1921 London Schedule of Payments.

Germany was not completely satisfied with the Dawes Plan either. In 1928 the full annual payment of 2.5 billion Reichsmarks was due for the first time. It corresponded to 12.4 per cent of total German government expenditure and 3.3 per cent of national income. If the economy continued to develop positively, the plan's prosperity index would have required an even higher sum, which could have threatened to exceed Germany's ability to pay.

Following extensive diplomatic consultations during the autumn meeting of the League of Nations, the six interested powers – Germany, France, Great Britain, Belgium, Italy and Japan – agreed on 16 September 1928 to set up an international commission of experts under the leadership of American economist Owen D. Young to settle the reparations question and at the same time to begin negotiations on the evacuation of the occupied Rhineland. The fourteen international financial experts chosen to draw up the new reparations plan were to be independent and guided only by their economic expertise.

=== Hague Conference ===
Owen D. Young, who headed the Young Commission

The governments of the six powers that had commissioned the drafting of the Young Plan agreed to it in principle in June 1929. The foreign ministers of France and Germany, Aristide Briand and Gustav Stresemann, then called for a conference to be held to decide on the final settlement of all questions still arising from the First World War.

At the first session of the Hague Conference from 6 to 31 August 1929, the British chancellor of the Exchequer, Labour Party politician Philip Snowden, demanded an increase of annual reparations payments to Britain by the equivalent of 48 million Reichsmarks. Snowden signalled that he was prepared to let the Young Plan fail if necessary. A solution was reached through shifts within the creditor instalments, above all at German expense, and compromise solutions were found on the question of deliveries in kind. Briand was then prepared to give in on the evacuation of the Rhineland and agreed to 30 June 1930 as the final date for the occupation.

The second session of the conference took place from 3 to 20 January 1930. Issues of a mostly technical nature were clarified, specifically the establishment of the Bank for International Settlements to handle the transfer of reparations payments and the question of whether, as provided for in the Treaty of Versailles, creditors could continue to impose sanctions in the event of a German default. It was agreed that the creditor nations would regain their "full freedom of action" if the International Court of Justice found that Germany was in the process of "tearing up" the Young Plan. The French saw in the statement the chance to fall back on the robust sanctions possibilities of the Versailles Treaty, while the Germans recognised in it merely the freedom of action to which every sovereign state was entitled under international law.

Due to the New York stock market crash of 24 October 1929, which had occurred between the two sessions at The Hague, it had become apparent that for the foreseeable future the American capital market would be unable to pre-finance the entire value of the German reparations debt for the European creditor powers. They had wanted to use mobilisation bonds to be able to repay the inter-Allied war debt to the US in a lump sum. The "New Plan", as the Young Plan was officially called, and the agreement on the evacuation of the Rhineland were nevertheless signed by the heads of government of the six powers on 20 January 1930.

== The Plan ==
The Young Plan provided for a German reparation debt of the equivalent of 36 billion Reichsmarks. It was to be repaid with interest through 1988, resulting in a total sum of 112 billion Reichsmarks. The annual installments were to rise rapidly from 1.7 billion to 2.1 billion Reichsmarks, falling to 1.65 billion after 1966. Taking 1930 as a basis, Germany would be required to pay annually, on average, the equivalent of about 12 per cent of its exports, 2.5 per cent of its net national product and 7.3 per cent of all public revenues.

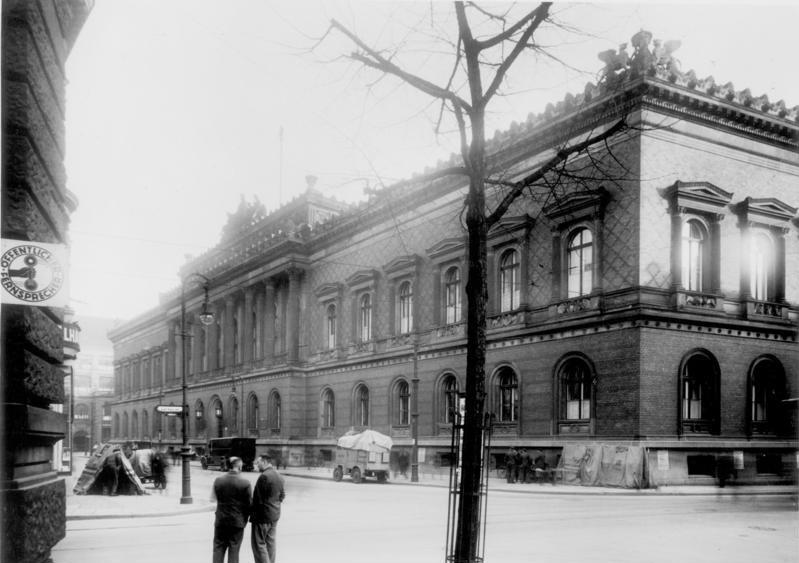
The Reichsbank building in Berlin. The Young Plan brought the bank back fully under German control.

The transfer protection of the Dawes Plan was abolished, meaning that in the future, Germany was responsible for ensuring that the sum raised from tax revenue could be transferred in foreign currency or in kind to the Bank for International Settlements. The institution took over the functions of the Reparation Commission, which was abolished, as was the office of the general agent for reparations payments. The control that the creditor powers had secured in the Dawes Plan over the German National Railway and the Reichsbank were also dropped, as was the prosperity index, which meant that Germany could be sure that it would not have to pay more if the economic situation was favourable.

The deliveries in kind (as, for example, coal), which had often competed with companies in the creditor countries, were to expire after ten years. The remaining payment obligation in foreign currency was divided into an unprotected installment, which had to be transferred in foreign currency under all circumstances and amounted to a constant 600 million Reichsmarks. The protected installment, which was more than twice as large, could initially be transferred in Reichsmarks in the event of a "relatively short depression", but the foreign currency had to be delivered within two years. The protected installment was closely linked to inter-allied war debts through the Concurrent Memorandum that the creditor powers attached to the Young Plan.

On 17 May 1930, the Young Plan came into force retroactively to 1 September 1929. At the same time, the Young bond was put on the market. Germany borrowed 1.47 billion Reichsmarks (300 million gold marks) at 5.5 percent interest for 35 years. Two-thirds of the sum went to the reparation creditors and to support the German economy and one-third to the postal service and the national railway. In spite of the poor capital market after the Wall Street crash, the bond was a success with the international public.

== Reactions ==
=== France ===
The Young Plan was mostly welcomed in France. The left-wing and liberal press judged it positively; only on the political right was criticism levelled that the plan and its accompanying withdrawal from the Rhineland affected both the financial and military security of the French Republic.

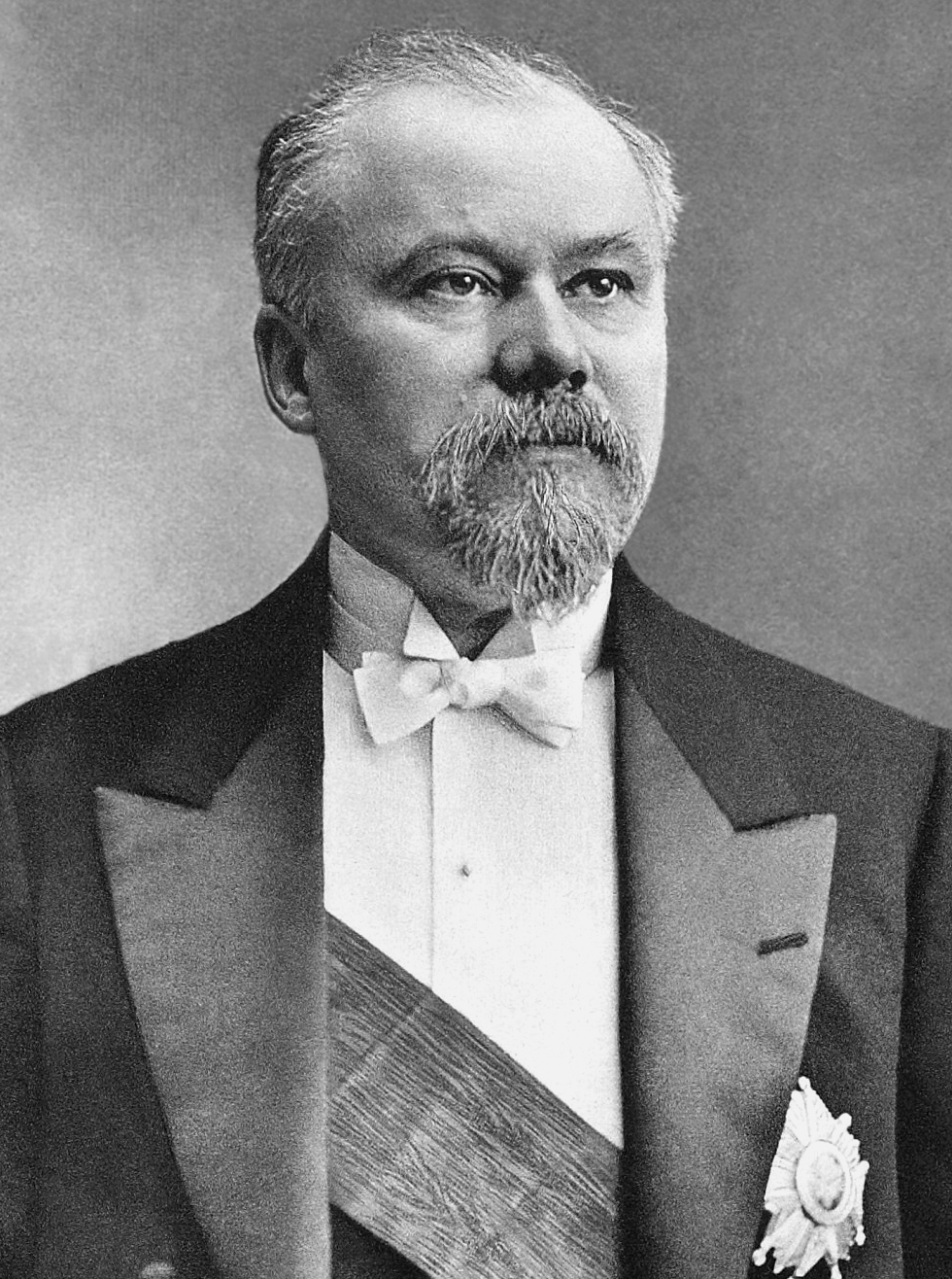
Prime Minister Raymond Poincaré. He was unable to convince the French parliament to accept the Young Plan.

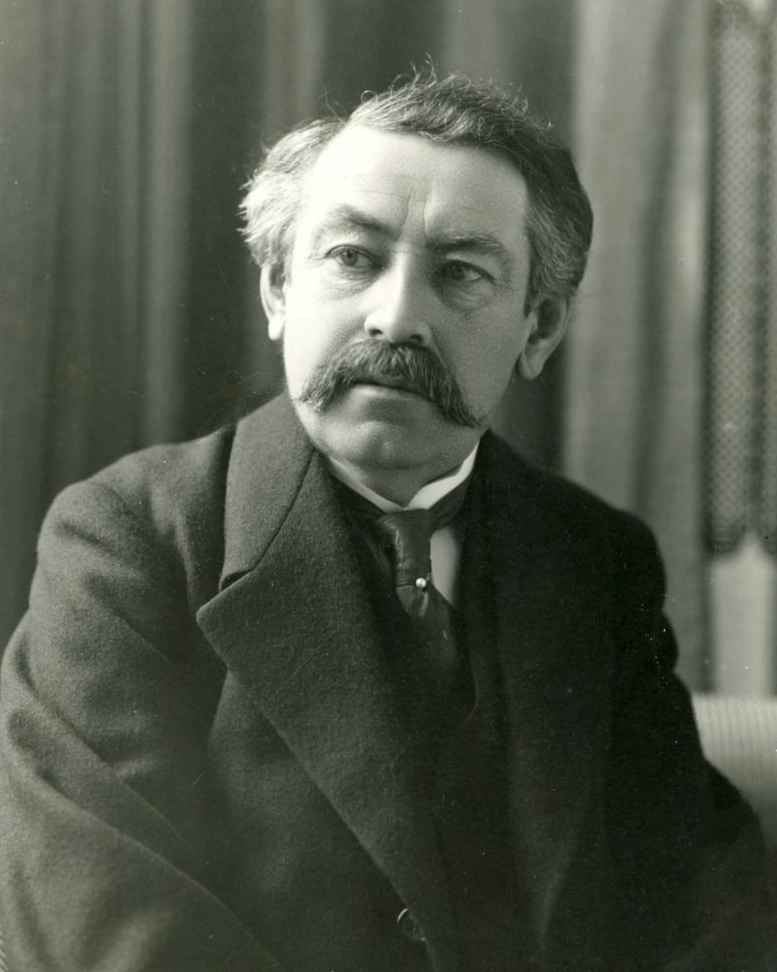
Aristide Briand. The foreign minister also failed to pass the Young Plan as prime minister.

Since all the governments from 1926 to 1932 were based on the political centre in coalition with the nationalists and right-wing Catholics, difficulties arose in the French parliament. It had not been possible to complete the Young Plan by July 1929, the deadline for ratification of the agreement on inter-allied war debts. Poincaré therefore had to ask the parliament to ratify the Mellon–Berenger Agreement on French debt owed to the United States before Germany had agreed to the Young Plan. Both the political right and the opposition Socialists, who otherwise supported Briand's foreign policy, insisted on linking the two debts, a position that the United States strongly opposed. By a narrow majority, the Chamber of Deputies approved the Mellon–Bérenger Agreement on 12 July 1929 with the reservation that it would only be serviced as long as sufficient reparations were collected from Germany. Since a conditional ratification would not be recognised by the United States, the reservation did not acquire legal force and only the debt agreement became legally binding. Poincaré resigned a few days later.

He was succeeded by Aristide Briand, whose attempt to pass the Young Plan also failed. After he too resigned, André Tardieu of the Democratic Republican Alliance became prime minister. He succeeded on 29 March 1930 in securing a majority for the ratification of the Young Plan. Following the wishes of several deputies of the Republican Federation, he had delayed the parliamentary debate until the German Reichstag had given its approval. The speech of the new finance minister Paul Reynaud expressed a highly positive balance: the Young Plan had put reparations on an equal footing with Germany's private debt and thus secured them, it covered the inter-allied war debts and generated a surplus for the reconstruction of French territories destroyed in the war. Although Versailles' original sum of 132 billion gold marks plus interest had had to be dropped, "the sacrifice is the price of the permanent solution". He did not mention the original goal of mobilising reparations on a large scale and repaying the inter-allied debt as a lump sum because a financial operation of such a magnitude had become impossible after the New York Stock Exchange crash.

After the adoption of the Young Plan, the French sought closer cooperation with Germany. Tardieu told the German ambassador that "conscious rapprochement with Germany" was the goal of his government. With the seemingly permanent solution to the reparations question and the withdrawal from the occupied Rhineland, the last points of contention stemming from the Treaty of Versailles appeared to have been resolved and the way cleared for a secure and peaceful future.

=== Germany ===
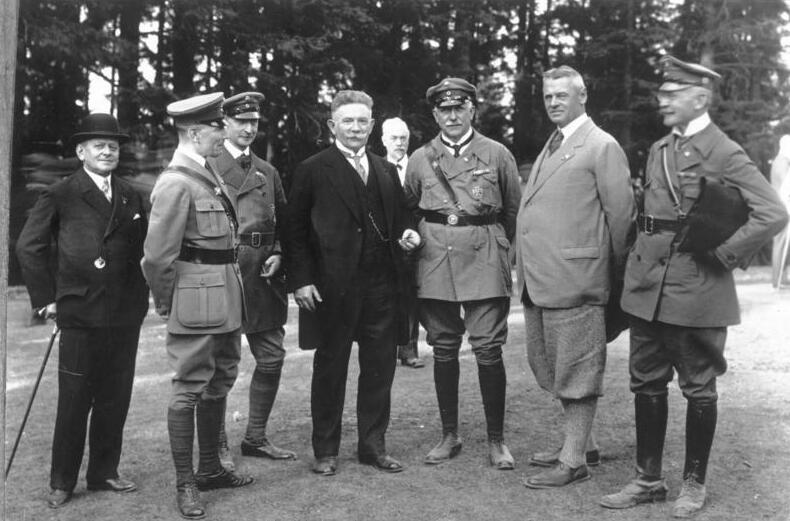
Participants in a rally against the Young Plan at the Hermann Monument on 1 September. Alfred Hugenberg is in the center.

Although the Young Plan had effectively reduced Germany's obligations, it was opposed by parts of the political spectrum in Germany. Nationalist parties had been most outspoken against reparations and seized on the Young Plan as an issue. A committee was formed of various nationalist groups under the leadership of Alfred Hugenberg, a media baron and head of the German National People's Party. One of the groups that joined was the Nazi Party led by Adolf Hitler.

The committee's goal was the enactment of what it called the "Law Against the Enslavement of the German People", or in its shortened form, the "Freedom Law". It would renounce all reparations and make it a criminal offense for any German official to sign a treaty that imposed new reparations obligations. It would also renounce the German acknowledgement of war guilt and the occupation of German territory, both of which were terms of the Treaty of Versailles The Freedom Law proposal was officially presented on 16 October 1929. The committee succeeded in collecting enough signatures to put the proposal before the Reichstag, which voted the bill down by a 318–82 margin. In the subsequent Freedom Law referendum, 94.5% of the votes cast were in favour of the proposed law, but voter turnout was just 14.9%, meaning that only 13.8% of eligible voters had voted in favour of the law. The referendum therefore failed, since it needed 50% of all eligible voters to pass.

The Young Plan was accepted by the Reichstag on 12 March 1930.

== Subsequent events ==
The Wall Street Crash of October 1929 had occurred between the initial agreement and the adoption of the Young Plan. With the severe world-wide economic downturn that heralded the Great Depression, United States President Herbert Hoover won support for a one-year moratorium on reparations payments from 15 nations by July 1931. A final effort to resolve the reparations issue was made at the Lausanne Conference of 1932. It essentially ended Germany's reparations payments.

However, Germany continued to pay interest on both Dawes and Young bonds, issued in 1924 and 1930. These were traded on the London Stock Exchange until the end of World War II, with Germany only stopping interest payments at the outbreak of war in 1939. In November 1934, Britain and Germany made what is known as the Anglo-German Payments Agreement, wherein among other terms, Germany agreed to continue paying interest on both Dawes and Young bonds in sterling.

It is estimated that Germany's total reparations payments up to 1931 came to about 36.1 billion marks.

After Germany's defeat in World War II, an international conference (London Agreement on German External Debts, 1953) decided that Germany would pay the remaining debt only after the country was reunified. West Germany nevertheless paid off the principal by 1980; then in 1995, after reunification, the new German government announced it would resume payments of the interest, including on the Young bonds. Germany was due to pay off the interest to the United States in 2010, and to other countries in 2020. In 2010, Time magazine reported that Germany made "final reparations-related payment for the Great War on Oct. 3, nearly 92 years after the country's defeat by the Allies".
