= 1932 Lausanne Conference =

Conference on post-WWI German war reparations

The Lausanne Conference of 1932, held from 16 June to 9 July 1932 in Lausanne, Switzerland, was a meeting of representatives from the United Kingdom, France, Italy, Belgium, Japan and Germany that resulted in an agreement to lower Germany's World War I reparations obligations as imposed by the Treaty of Versailles and the 1929 Young Plan. The reduction of approximately 90 per cent was made as a result of the difficult economic circumstances during the Great Depression. The Lausanne Treaty never came into effect because it was dependent on an agreement with the United States on the repayment of the loans it had made to the Allied powers during World War I, and that agreement was never reached. The Lausanne Conference marked the de facto end of Germany's reparations payments until after World War II.

== Background ==
In mid-1931, eighteen months after the Wall Street crash of 1929, Germany experienced a severe banking crisis that saw the collapse of the Danat-Bank, the country's second largest, and the suspension of gold convertibility. In July 1931 United States President Herbert Hoover, with the support of 15 other nations, announced a one-year moratorium on Germany's war reparations payments under the Young Plan and also on the payment of war debts between the Allies, which were owed mostly to the United States.

A number of expert commissions then determined that Germany would not be able to resume its reparations payments even after the moratorium expired. The conclusion was confirmed in the December 1931 final report of the Special Advisory Committee of the Bank for International Settlements, which had met at Germany's request and recommended that a new reparations conference be convened. The conference in Lausanne, Switzerland was originally scheduled to begin on 18 January 1932 but was postponed until June. Shortly before it opened, the government of German chancellor Heinrich Brüning resigned. The new chancellor, Franz von Papen, whose cabinet was ruling by presidential decrees rather than through the German Reichstag, represented Germany at the Lausanne conference.

== Negotiations ==
The German delegation, in keeping with former chancellor Brüning's policy, sought the complete cancellation of reparations payments. Economics Minister Hermann Warmbold and Finance Minister Lutz Graf Schwerin von Krosigk defended the position, which was also widely held in the British financial world. Warmbold and Krosigk argued that the reparations paid up to that point, together with the payments of inter-allied war debts and related loans, were the cause of the worldwide financial and economic crisis. Unproductive capital of that kind, they said, capital that was not used for investments, only worsened the crisis.

The French government insisted that the Young Plan could be terminated only by Germany paying the full remaining balance. German proposals to make the complete termination of reparations acceptable through closer political ties with France were rejected and then countered with an offer of economic and financial participation in a European reconstruction programme. It was thought that reparations payments would be supportable since Germany would also benefit from the hoped-for general improvement of the European economy.

As an additional political consideration, the draft of an advisory pact between France, Great Britain, Italy and Germany was presented. It was intended to bind Germany more closely to the Western Allies in foreign and security policy. The Franco-German talks even proposed a military entente between the two nations, with regular joint general staff meetings.

When the conference threatened to fail after two weeks, its president, British Prime Minister Ramsay MacDonald, asked under what political conditions Germany would agree to a final reparations payment. Only then did Germany put on the agenda the removal of the so-called war guilt clause from the Treaty of Versailles and the replacement of its military limitations in Part V of the Treaty with equal rights for Germany.

On 5 July, after difficult negotiations among the Western powers, a solution was reached which, for a final payment of four billion Reichsmarks, offered not only the termination of all reparations but also an advisory pact between France, Great Britain, Italy and Germany; a common, Europe-wide monetary policy; the striking of the "war guilt" article and a declaration of Germany's "moral equality" at the ongoing Geneva Disarmament Conference.

The Papen government then overstepped the mark with even more comprehensive and specific wishes in the political sphere along with a counter-offer of only 2.6 billion Reichsmarks. On 7 July French Prime Minister Édouard Herriot rejected the inclusion of political issues in the Lausanne conference and two days later the Treaty of Lausanne was announced.

== Result and consequences ==
The Treaty of Lausanne obliged the Weimar Republic to make a final payment of three billion gold marks, payable in five-percent bonds to the Bank for International Settlements in Basel, Switzerland. The bonds were redeemable only after a period of three years – thus providing a 3-year suspension of payments – with the interest income accruing to the creditor powers. The bonds were then to be put on the market within 15 years when economic conditions became favorable or, if that failed to occur, destroyed. The terms reduced Germany's obligations by 90%, from $33 billion to $714 million.

The far right parties in Germany – the German National People's Party and National Socialists – rejected the Treaty of Lausanne as unacceptable since it did not contain the expected deletion of the war guilt article and the disarmament provisions of the Treaty of Versailles.

The Lausanne Treaty was to become effective as soon as a corresponding agreement had been reached with the United States on the repayment of the loans it had made to the Allied powers during World War I. Due to the failure to come to such an agreement, the Lausanne Treaty was not ratified by any of the states involved and therefore never became legally valid. Germany's presentation of the bonds for three billion marks to the Bank for International Settlements effectively marked the end of the reparations issue. After the National Socialists came to power in 1933, they repudiated the debt.

The bonds were ceremonially burned in Basel in 1948.
