= Hoover Moratorium =

Suspension of German war reparations payments

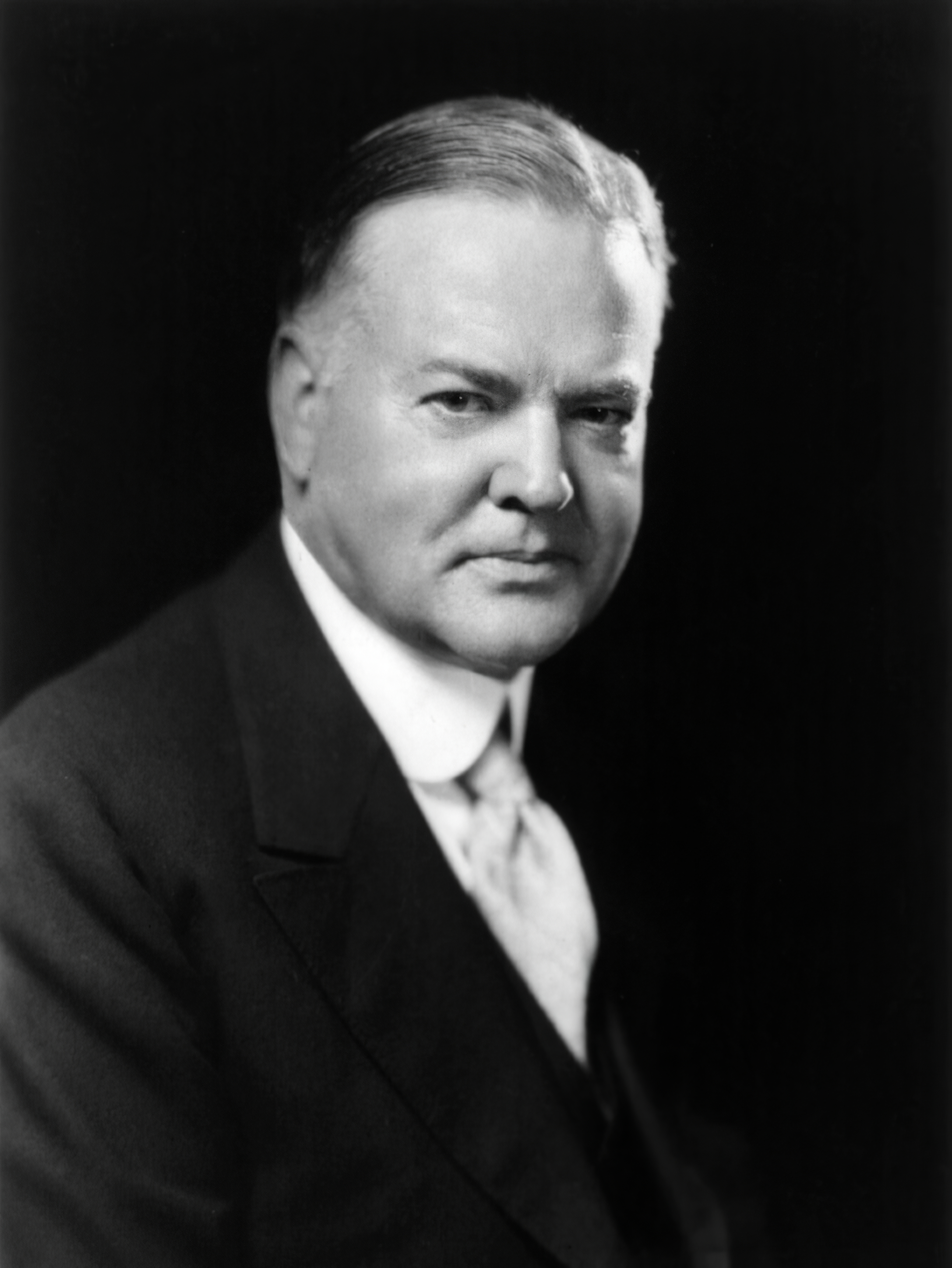
- President Herbert Hoover, who proposed the moratorium in June 1931.
- Date: June 20, 1931 (proposed); July 6, 1931 (effective)
- Location: International (primarily United States, Germany, France, and United Kingdom)
- Type: Economic policy / Debt suspension
- Participants: Herbert Hoover (United States); Heinrich Brüning (Germany); Pierre Laval (France)
- Outcome: One-year suspension of World War I reparations and war debts; Temporarily eased the German banking crisis; Failed to stop the broader economic collapse of the Great Depression; Led to the Lausanne Conference (effectively ending reparations)

The Hoover Moratorium was a one-year suspension of Germany's World War I reparations obligations and of the repayment of the war loans that the United States had extended to the Allies in 1917–18. The moratorium was the result of a proposal issued on 20 June 1931 by United States President Herbert Hoover which was intended to ease the effects of the Great Depression and the ongoing international financial crisis and provide time for recovery.

The proposal was met with mixed reactions. Germany welcomed the relief, but other nations resisted, particularly France, which was heavily reliant on German reparations to service its own war debts, and many American citizens. After much telephone lobbying by Hoover, it had gained support from 15 nations by 6 July. It was approved by the United States Congress in December.

The moratorium did little to slow the economic downturn in Europe. Germany was caught in a major banking crisis, Britain left the gold standard – the US would follow suit in 1933 as part of President Franklin Roosevelt's New Deal – and France intended to address the issues again once the one-year suspension had ended.

A few of the former Allies continued to make payments to the United States after the moratorium expired, but only Finland was able and willing to meet all obligations. A committee formed under the terms of Young Plan – a previous reduction in Germany's reparations schedule – concluded that Germany would not be able to meet its obligations and recommended that they be permanently cancelled. At the Lausanne Conference of 1932, the United Kingdom and France relieved Germany of its reparation obligations, subject to their being able to reach an agreement with the United States concerning their own outstanding war debts. Although the United States Congress voted against the proposal to relieve France and the United Kingdom of their debt, they never restarted payments, since previously German reparations had been used for the purpose, and the economic conditions militated against Germany being able to do so in the future.

== See also ==
- Dawes Plan
- Young Plan
- Lausanne Conference of 1932
