= Dawes Plan =

1924 plan to resolve Germany's World War I reparations

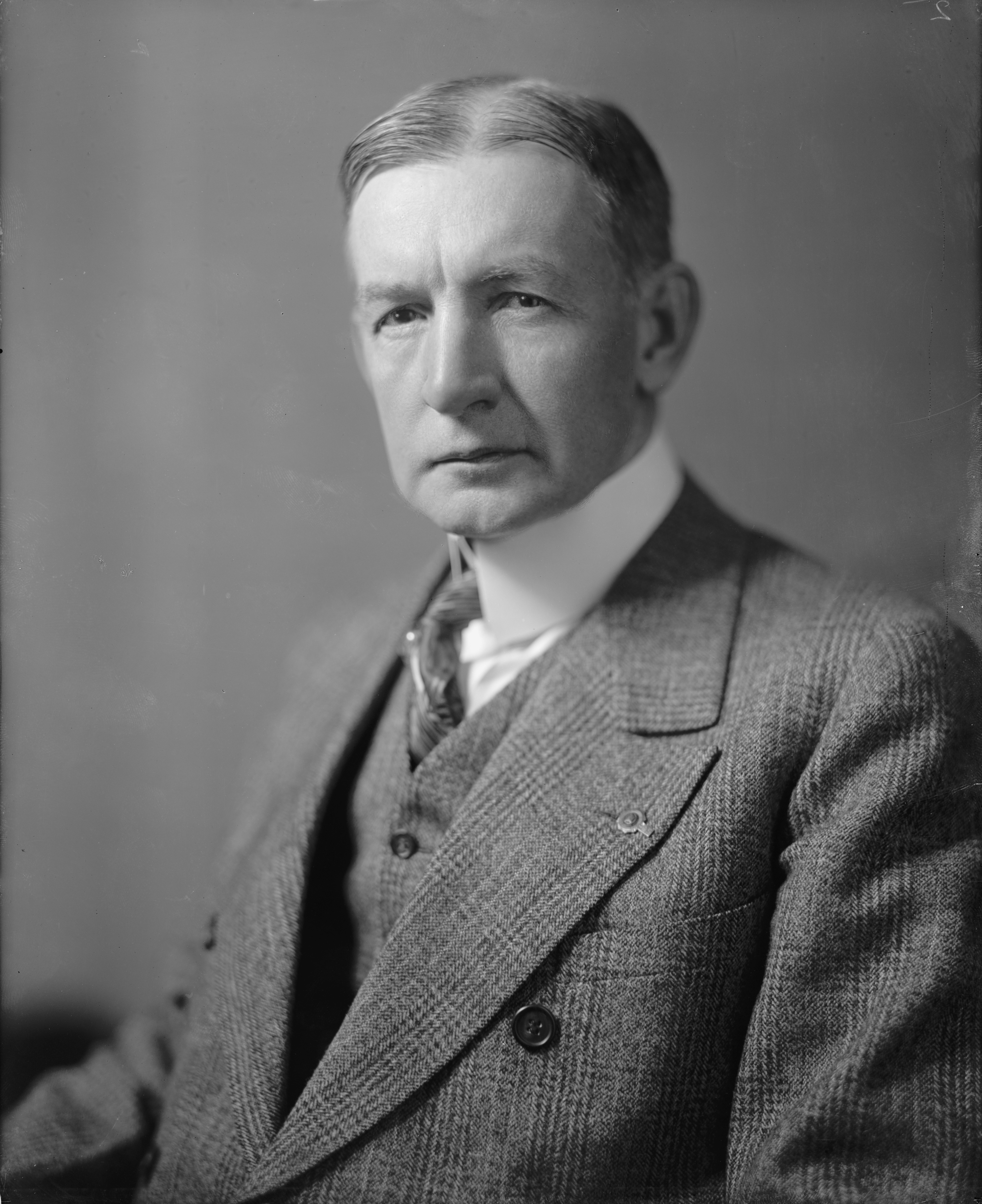
- Charles G. Dawes, chairman of the Dawes Committee, whose work resolved the 1923–1924 reparations crisis.
- Type: International economic restructuring agreement / Reparations plan
- Context: World War I reparations crisis and the Allied Occupation of the Ruhr
- Signed: 16 August 1924
- Effective: 1 September 1924
- Expiration: Superseded by the Young Plan (1929)
- Negotiators: Charles G. Dawes (Chairman); Owen D. Young
- Signatories: Weimar Republic; United States; United Kingdom; France; Belgium; Kingdom of Italy
- Language: English, French, German

The Dawes Plan temporarily resolved the issue of the reparations that Germany owed to the Allies of World War I. Enacted in 1924, it ended the crisis in European diplomacy that occurred after French and Belgian troops occupied the Ruhr in response to Germany's failure to meet its reparations obligations.

The Plan set up a staggered schedule for Germany's payment of war reparations, provided for a large loan to stabilise the German currency and ended the occupation of the Ruhr. It resulted in a brief period of economic recovery in the second half of the 1920s, although it came at the price of a heavy reliance on foreign capital. The Dawes Plan was superseded by the Young Plan in 1929.

Because the Plan resolved a serious international crisis, the American Charles G. Dawes, who headed the group that developed it, received the Nobel Peace Prize in 1925.

== Background ==
At the end of World War I, the Allied Powers included in the Treaty of Versailles a plan for the reparations for which Germany would be liable. It established an interim 20 billion Reichsmarks to be paid through April 1920 and left the full details to be determined by an Inter-Allied Reparation Commission. In April 1921, the Allies adopted the London Schedule of Payments that the Commission had developed. It established the total German reparations figure at 132 billion gold marks (US $442 billion in 2023 dollars). The schedule was separated into three classes, of which only the first two, amounting to 50 billion gold marks, were expected to be paid.

On 5 May 1921 the Allies delivered an ultimatum to Germany demanding that it accept the London Schedule within six days and threatening to occupy the heavily industrialized Ruhr district if it did not. The Reichstag voted to accept on 11 May, following which the government began to implement its fulfilment policy (Erfüllungspolitik), an effort to show the impossibility of meeting the payments by attempting to fulfil them. Germany made its first payment of one billion gold marks in the summer of 1921 but after that paid little in cash and fell behind in its deliveries of materials such as coal and timber. After Germany was declared in default in January 1923, French and Belgian troops occupied the Ruhr. Germany responded with passive resistance to the occupation. The government printed money in order to pay the idled workers, which fuelled the hyperinflation that all but wrecked the German economy.

Ensuing events led the Allies to decide that the London Schedule needed to be re-examined. The Ruhr occupation had heightened tension between France and Germany. The acceptance of the London Schedule by Germany's government increased political instability. Chancellor Joseph Wirth's fulfilment policy angered many on the right, who called it traitorous. Radical right-wing groups instigated a hate campaign against representatives of the Republic that included the assassination in August 1921 of Matthias Erzberger, one of the signers of the Armistice of 11 November 1918, and in June 1922 of Foreign Minister Walther Rathenau. The United States feared a coup from either the right or the left and that if one did take place, the large amount of money it had loaned to France and England during the war – the repayment of which was in large part dependent on the receipt of German reparations – might never be recovered.

=== Dawes committee ===
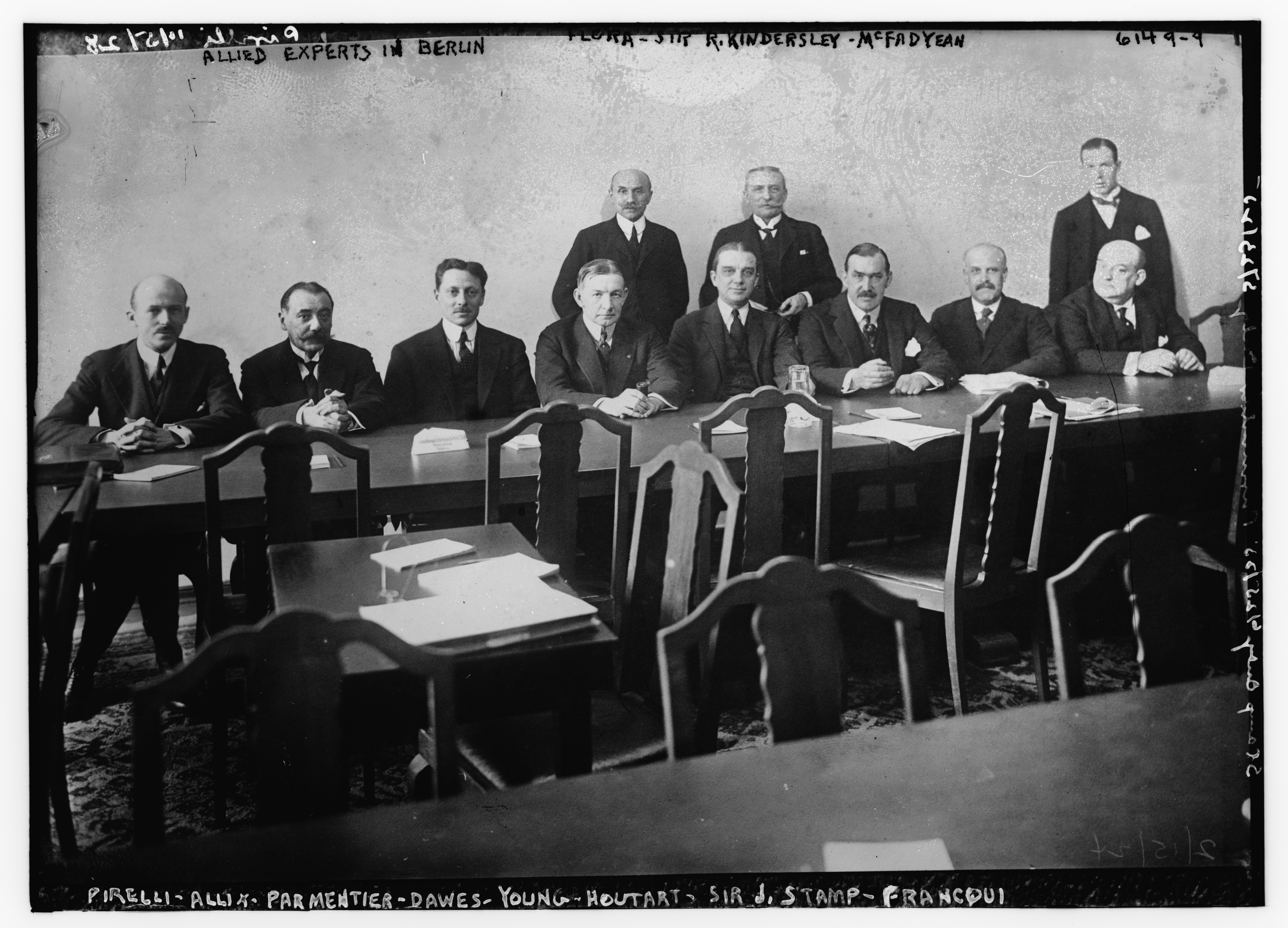
The Dawes committee in Berlin. Dawes is seated fourth from left. On his left is Owen Young, from whom the 1929 Young Plan took its name.

In 1923 the new German chancellor Gustav Stresemann ordered an end to passive resistance, implemented a currency reform that brought an end to the hyperinflation and sought discussions with the Allied Powers which would take into consideration what Germany was financially capable of paying. The Reparations Commission set up the Dawes committee, consisting of ten expert representatives nominated by their respective countries: two each from Belgium (Baron Maurice Houtart, Emile Francqui), France (Jean Parmentier, Edgard Allix), Britain (Sir Josiah C. Stamp, Sir Robert M. Kindersley), Italy (Alberto Pirelli, Federico Flora) and the United States (Charles G. Dawes and Owen D. Young). Dawes, the head of the committee, was a former army general, banker and politician. His committee was tasked with examining the stabilization of Germany's currency, its budget and its resources. Based on the studies, the committee was to recommend a realistic schedule of payments – one taking into account Germany's ability to pay – that would replace the London Schedule.

== The Plan ==
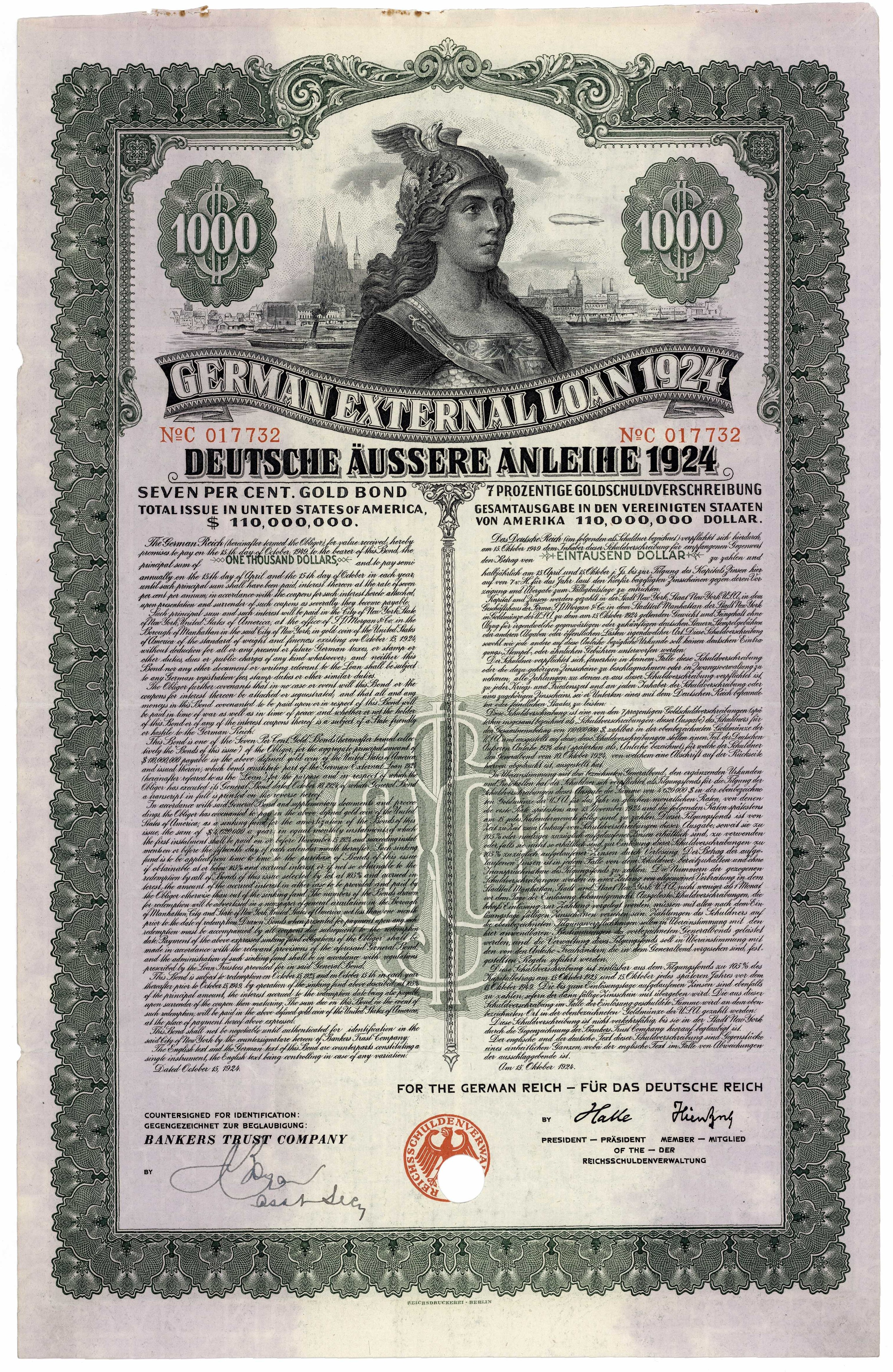
German External Loan, issued 15 October 1924

The Dawes Report stressed in its introduction that "the guarantees we propose are economic and not political in nature". The resulting Dawes Plan covered payment amounts and timing, sources of revenue, loans to Germany, currency stabilization and ending the Ruhr occupation:

- Reparations payments began at one billion Reichsmarks the first year, increasing annually to two and a half billion after five years. No total sum was set. The terms included a prosperity index, based on which Germany would have to pay more under favourable economic circumstances.
- The sources for reparation payments included taxes on customs duties, alcohol, tobacco and sugar, and revenue from railroads and the budget. As a guarantee for payments, the German National Railway was converted into a corporation under creditor-state supervision. An interest-bearing mortgage on German industry for 5 billion Reichsmarks also served as a guarantee.
- The Reichsbank was reorganized under the supervision of the creditor states. It had seven representatives from the creditor states and seven Germans on its board and was independent of the central government.
- Germany was loaned 800 million Reichsmarks to be the base capital of the central bank and to ensure the Reichsmark’s stability. About half of the sum was raised through Wall Street bond issues in the United States.
- The Allied Reparations Commission was replaced by a Transfer Committee which was to take the value of the Reichsmark into consideration when making payment transfers. Payments were not to be made if they endangered the gold that backed the Reichsmark. Repayment of commercial debts took priority over reparations payments in order to maintain Germany's creditworthiness.
- Foreign troops were to be withdrawn from the Ruhr.

== Reichstag approval ==
The debate over the Dawes Plan in the Reichstag affected the formation of a new government following the May 1924 Reichstag election. The Communist Party of Germany (KPD) saw the Dawes Plan as economic imperialism, and the Nazi Party objected altogether to paying reparations. Many on the political right objected to it because of the limits it placed on German sovereignty (control of the Reichsbank and the national railroad). The right-wing nationalist German National People's Party (DNVP) had campaigned against the Dawes Plan and gained 24 additional seats, making it the second strongest party in the Reichstag after the Social Democrats. The party's refusal to change its stance on the Dawes Plan resulted in Chancellor Wilhelm Marx of the Centre Party remaining in office presiding over a centrist minority cabinet. Since the clause in the Dawes Plan regarding the German National Railway required a change in the Weimar Constitution and therefore a two-thirds majority in the Reichstag to pass, it was necessary for some DNVP members to vote for acceptance. A number of influential industrial and agricultural interest groups urged the DNVP to accept the Plan, with the result that it passed on 29 August 1924 with the help of 48 DNVP votes. The Dawes Plan formally went into effect on 1 September 1924.

== Results ==
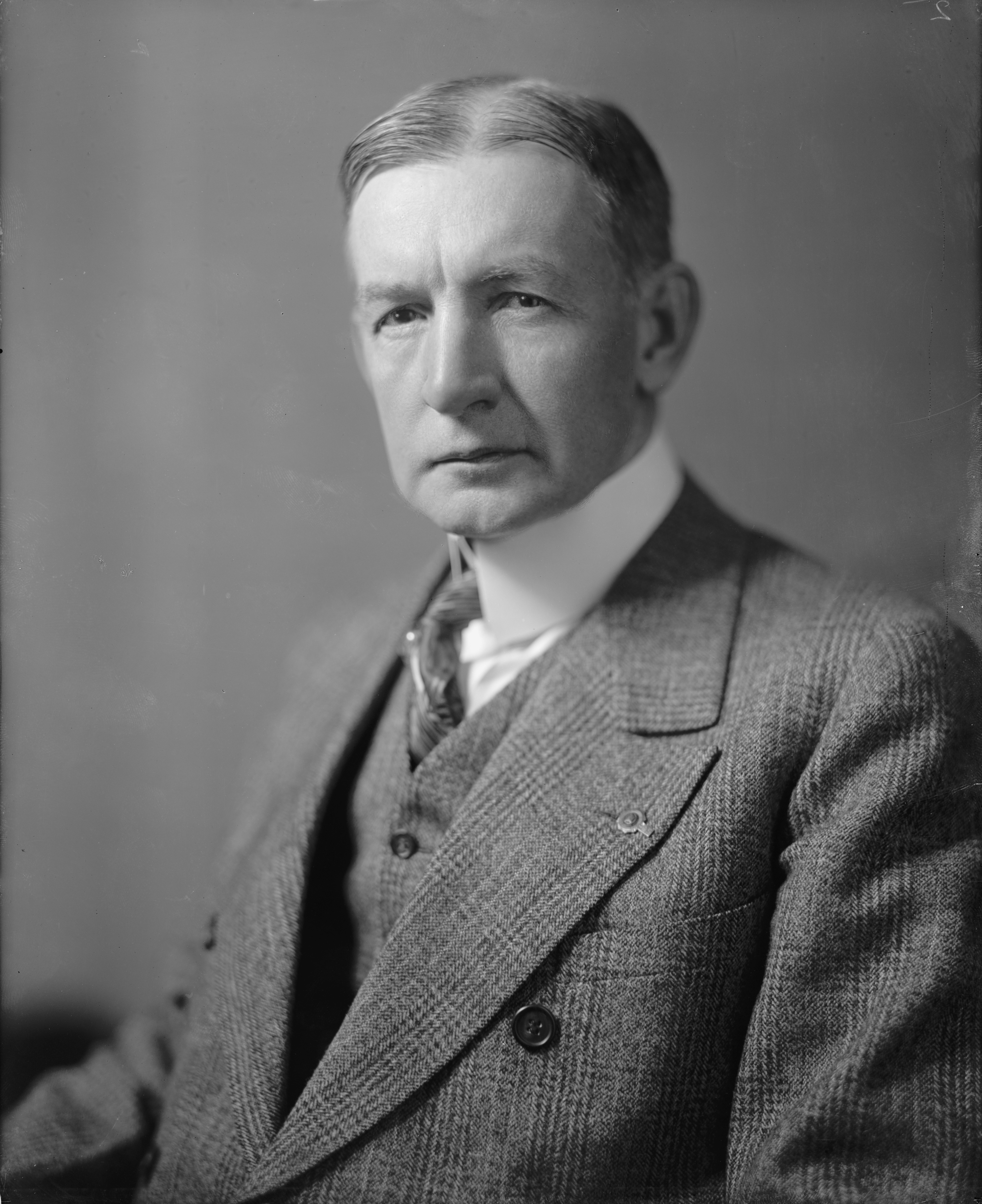
Charles G. Dawes (1865–1951), who was awarded the 1925 Nobel Peace Prize for his work on the Dawes Plan

The influx of foreign credit led to the upswing in the German economy that underpinned the "Golden Twenties" of 1924–1929. Overall economic production increased 50% in five years, unemployment fell sharply and Germany's 34% share of world trade was higher than it had been in 1913, the last full year before the outbreak of World War I. By the start of the world economic crisis in 1929, Germany had received 29 billion Reichsmarks in loans. In spite of the stronger economy, Germany was unable to achieve the trade surpluses necessary to finance reparations. It met almost all of its payments under the Dawes plan but could do so only on the basis of its large foreign debt. Most loans were short term, which meant that they could be quickly called in if the creditor nation experienced an economic downturn. Germany found itself heavily reliant on foreign capital.

The occupation of the Ruhr ended on 25 August 1925.

Germany considered the Dawes Plan to be a temporary measure and expected a revised solution in the future. In 1928 German Foreign Minister Gustav Stresemann, the former chancellor, called for a final plan to be established, and the Young Plan was enacted in 1929.

Dawes, who was the U.S. vice president at the time, received the Nobel Peace Prize of 1925 for "his crucial role in bringing about the Dawes Plan", specifically for the way it reduced the state of tension between France and Germany resulting from Germany's missed reparations payments and France's occupation of the Ruhr. British foreign minister Austen Chamberlain shared the prize with Dawes, although his award was for the Locarno Treaties, which dealt with post-war territorial settlements.
