= Gabor Batonyi =

Hungarian historian

Gabor Batonyi is a Hungarian historian who has published numerous historical articles.

== Education ==
He earned a degree in history at the Faculty of Teacher Training of Eötvös Loránd University.

== Career ==
Since the late 1990s, he has been a lecturer in the Department of Peace Studies and International Development at the University of Bradford where he teaches History. He served as the Foreign Affairs Editor for the Hungarian Television Company (MTV) in 1989–1992. He is a fellow of the Royal Historical Society and one of the editors of the journal Central and Eastern European Review.

His principal research topics are recent Central European history, focusing on the history of Hungary 1918–1989, British foreign policy in Central Europe, including interwar diplomatic history, British intelligence and special operations during the Second World War, and the relationship between Britain and Hungary from 1918.

== Publications ==
- ‘Mission to survive: Hungarian historian Gyula Szekf¿ as agent and diplomat’, Slavonic and East European Review,90/4 (2012), 705–34.
- ‘Hungarian opposition and resistance to Stalinism in the early 1950s’, in L. Péter and M. Rady (eds), Resistance, Rebellion and Revolution in Hungary and Central Europe: Commemorating 1956 (UCL, London, 2009), 159–70.
- ‘Anglo-Austrian relations between the wars’, in K. Koch and A. Suppan (eds), Von Saint Germain zum Belvedere: Österreich und Europa 1919–1955,Außenpolitische Dokumente der Republik Österreich 1918–1938 (ADÖ), Special Issue (Oldenbourg Wissenschaftsverlag, Munich and Vienna, 2007), 115–28.
- ‘Magyarország világháborús részvétele brit szemszögbol’, in Gy. Markó (ed.), Háború, Hadsereg, Összeomlás: Magyarpolitika, katonapolitika a második világháborúban (Zrínyi Kiadó, Budapest, 2005), 61–9.
- ‘British foreign policy and the problem of Hungarian revisionism in the 1930s’, in L. Péter and M. Rady (eds), British-Hungarian Relations since 1848 (UCL, London, 2004), 205–16.
- Britain and Central Europe, 1918–1932 (Clarendon Press, Oxford, 1999).

=== Conferences ===
- ‘British diplomacy and the “lingering trace” of Anglophilia in post-war Hungary’, Anglophilia and the British Constitution in Central Europe 1700–2000, University of Notre Dame, London, October 2013.
- ‘Egy elkésett brit kísérlet a magyar kommunisták megfékezésére és a megtorlás’,International Symposium on the Crimes of Communism, Konrad Adenauer Stiftung, Budapest, November 2011.
- ‘Hungarian opposition and resistance to Stalinism’, Resistance, Rebellion and Revolution in Central Europe: Commemorating 1956, UCL, London, September 2006.
- ‘Magyarország világháborús részvétele az angolszász hatalmak szemszögéb¿l’, International Conference on Hungary’s Participation in the Second World War, Institute of Military History, Budapest, May 2005.
- ‘British foreign policy and the problem of Hungarian revisionism in the 1930s’, British–Hungarian Relations since 1848, UCL, London, May 2004.
- ‘The myth of disinterest: Britain and ethnic conflict in interwar Central Europe’, Forum of British, Czech and Slovak Historians, University of Dundee, March 2002.
- ‘Nationalism and communism in Hungary in the early 1950s’, German History Society Annual Regional Conference, University of Swansea, June 2001.
- ‘British intelligence and Horthy’s peace initiatives’, Albion Conference, University of Debrecen, May 2001.
