= International relations (1919–1939) =

Relations between countries from 1919 to 1939

International relations (1919–1939) covers the main interactions shaping world history in this era, known as the interwar period, with emphasis on diplomacy and economic relations. The coverage here follows the diplomatic history of World War I.

The important stages of interwar diplomacy and international relations included resolutions of wartime issues, such as reparations owed by Germany and boundaries; American involvement in European finances and disarmament projects; the expectations and failures of the League of Nations; the relationships of the new countries to the old; the distrustful relations between the Soviet Union and the capitalist world; peace and disarmament efforts; responses to the Great Depression starting in 1929; the collapse of world trade; the collapse of democratic regimes one by one; the growth of economic autarky; Japanese aggressiveness toward China; fascist diplomacy, including the aggressive moves by Fascist Italy and Nazi Germany; the Spanish Civil War.

Other articles cover causes of World War II in 1938–1939. See Second Sino-Japanese War regarding Japan and China. See appeasement regarding Germany's expansionist moves toward the Rhineland, Austria, and Czechoslovakia, and the last, desperate stages of rearmament as another world war increasingly loomed.

== Peace and disarmament ==
There were no great wars in the 1920s. There were a few small wars on the periphery that generally ended by 1922 and did not threaten to escalate. The exceptions included the Russian Civil War of 1917–1922, Polish–Soviet War of 1919–1921, the Greco-Turkish War of 1919–1922, and some civil wars, such as in Ireland. Instead, the ideals of peace is a theme that dominated the international agenda of all major nations in the 1920s. British Labour leader and Prime Minister Ramsay MacDonald was especially articulate:

"So soon as you aim at a guarantee by a body like the League of Nations you minimize and subordinate the military value of the pact and raise to a really effective standard the moral guarantees that flow from Conciliation, arbitration, impartial, and judicial judgment exercised by the body."

=== League of Nations ===
The main institution intended to bring peace and stability and resolve disputes was the League of Nations, created in 1919. The League was weakened by the non-participation of the United States, Germany, and the Soviet Union, as well as (later) of Japan. It could not handle the refusal of major countries, especially Japan and Italy, to accept adverse decisions. Historians agree it was ineffective in major disputes.

A series of international crises strained the League to its limits, the earliest being the Japanese invasion of Manchuria. Japan was censured and quit the League. This was soon followed by the Abyssinian Crisis of 1934–1936, in which Italy invaded Ethiopia (Abyssinia), one of the two independent African nations. The League tried to enforce economic sanctions upon Italy, but to no avail. The incident highlighted French and British weaknesses, exemplified by their reluctance to alienate Italy and lose it as a counterweight against Hitler's Germany. The limited actions taken by the Western powers pushed Mussolini's Italy towards alliance with Hitler's Germany. The Abyssinian war showed the world how ineffective the League was at solving disputes. It played no role in dealing with the Spanish Civil War. The league also could not resolve other smaller conflicts involving major European nations, such as the Rif War between Spain and Morocco separatists.

=== Disarmament ===
The Washington Naval Conference, also known as the Washington Arms Conference or the Washington Disarmament Conference, was a military conference called by US President Warren G. Harding and held in Washington, under the Chairmanship of Secretary of State Charles Evans Hughes from 12 November 1921 to 6 February 1922. Conducted outside the auspice of the League of Nations, it was attended by nine nations: the United States, Japan, China, France, Great Britain, Italy, Belgium, Netherlands, and Portugal. The Soviet Union was not invited. The conference focused on resolving misunderstandings or conflicts regarding interests in the Pacific Ocean and East Asia. The main achievement was a series of naval disarmament postals agreed to by all the participants, which lasted for a decade. These resulted in three major treaties – Four-Power Treaty, Five-Power Treaty (the Washington Naval Treaty), the Nine-Power Treaty – and a number of smaller agreements.

Britain now took the lead. The successful London Naval Treaty of 1930 continued the warship limitations among the major powers first set out in 1922. The treaties of 1922–30 preserved peace during the 1920s but were not renewed, as the world scene turned increasingly negative starting in 1931.

=== The peaceful spirit of Locarno ===
The seven international treaties negotiated at Locarno in 1925 by the major powers in Europe (not including the Soviet Union) significantly strengthened the legitimacy of Germany, paving the way to its return to the role of a major power and membership in the League of Nations in 1926, with a permanent seat on its council. The Locarno Treaties marked a dramatic improvement in the political climate of western Europe in 1924–1930. They promoted expectations for continued peaceful settlements, often called the "spirit of Locarno". This spirit was made concrete when Germany joined the League in 1926, and the withdrawal of Allied troops occupying Germany's Rhineland.

Historian Sally Marks says:

"Henceforth the spirit of Locarno would reign, substituting conciliation for enforcement as the basis for peace. Yet for some peace remained a desperate hope rather than an actuality. A few men knew that the spirit of Locarno was a fragile foundation on which to build a lasting peace."

Nazi Germany had no use for a peaceful spirit. It repudiated Locarno by sending troops into the demilitarized Rhineland on 7 March 1936.

=== Outlawing war ===
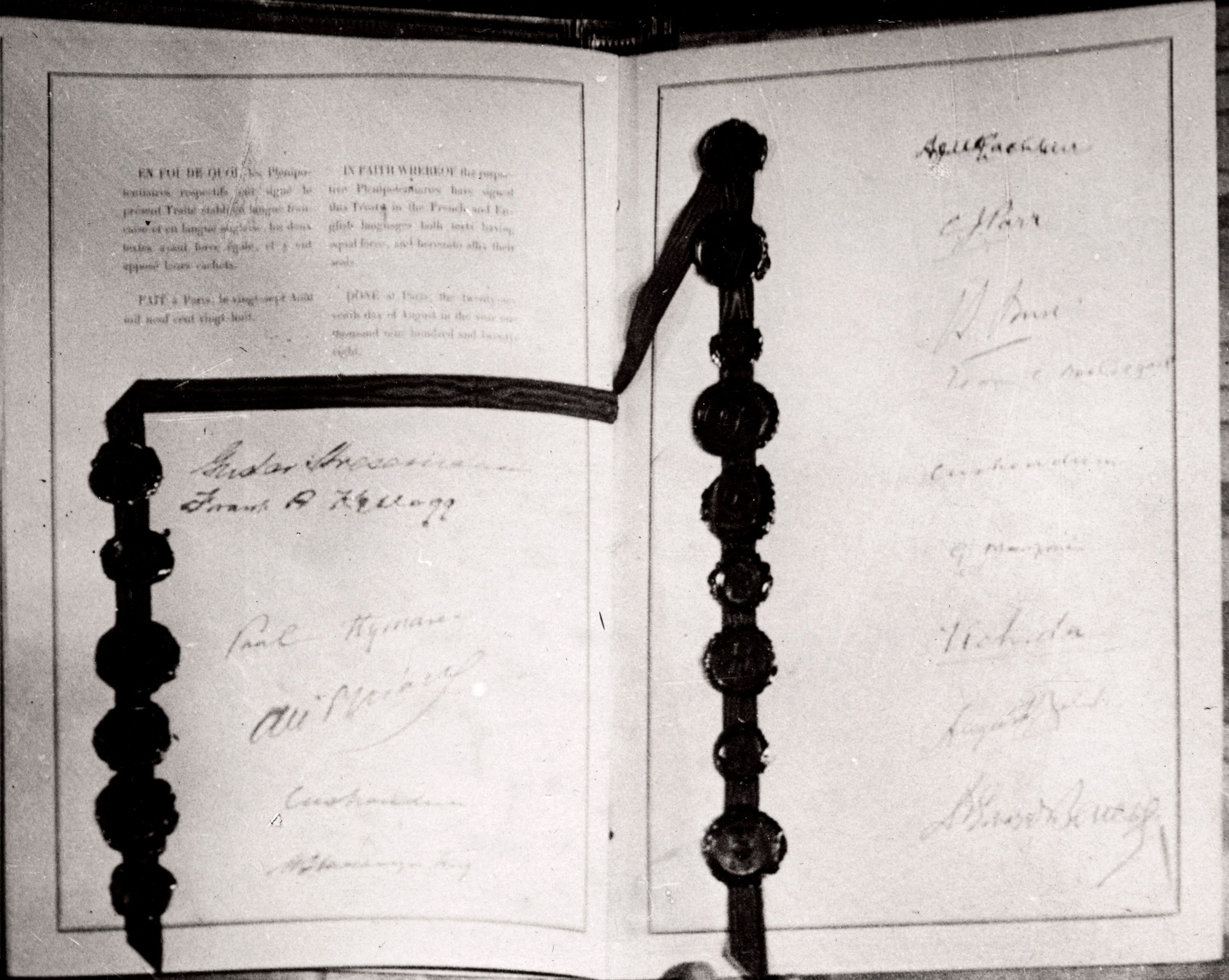
Fourteen major nations were the first to sign the Kellogg-Briand Pact in Paris in 1928

The Kellogg–Briand Pact of 1928 resulted from a proposal drafted by the United States and France that, in effect, outlawed war to resolve "disputes or conflicts of whatever nature or of whatever origin they may be, which may arise among them". Most nations readily signed up and used the occasion to promote the goal of peaceful foreign policies. The only issue was the actual formula of the renunciation of all wars – the French wanted the definition restricted to wars of aggression, while the Americans insisted it should include all kinds of warfare. Historian Harold Josephson notes that the Pact has been ridiculed for its moralism and legalism and lack of influence on foreign policy. He argues that it instead led to a more activist American foreign policy. Its central provisions renouncing the use of war, and promoting peaceful settlement of disputes and the use of collective force to prevent aggression, were incorporated into the UN Charter and other treaties. Although civil wars continued, wars between established states have been rare since 1945, with a few exceptions in the Middle East, Africa, and Asia.

In the United States, much energetic grass-roots support came from women's organizations and Protestant churches.

=== Criminalizing poison gas ===
Poison gas became the focus of a worldwide crusade in the 1920s. Poison gas did not win battles, and the generals did not want it. The soldiers hated it far more intensely than bullets or explosive shells. By 1918, chemical shells made up 35 percent of French ammunition supplies, 25 percent of British, and 20 percent of the American stock. The "Protocol for the Prohibition of the Use in War of Asphyxiating, Poisonous, or Other Gases and of Bacteriological Methods of Warfare" (Geneva Protocol) was issued in 1925, and was accepted as policy by all major countries.

=== Protecting power ===
In the interwar period, the diplomatic role of an official protecting power was formalized in the Geneva Convention of 1929. Protecting powers were allowed to inspect prisoner of war camps, interview prisoners in private, communicate freely with prisoners, and supply books for the prison library. However, a suggestion by the International Committee of the Red Cross that it be made responsible for ensuring compliance with the treaty was rejected.

== Europe ==
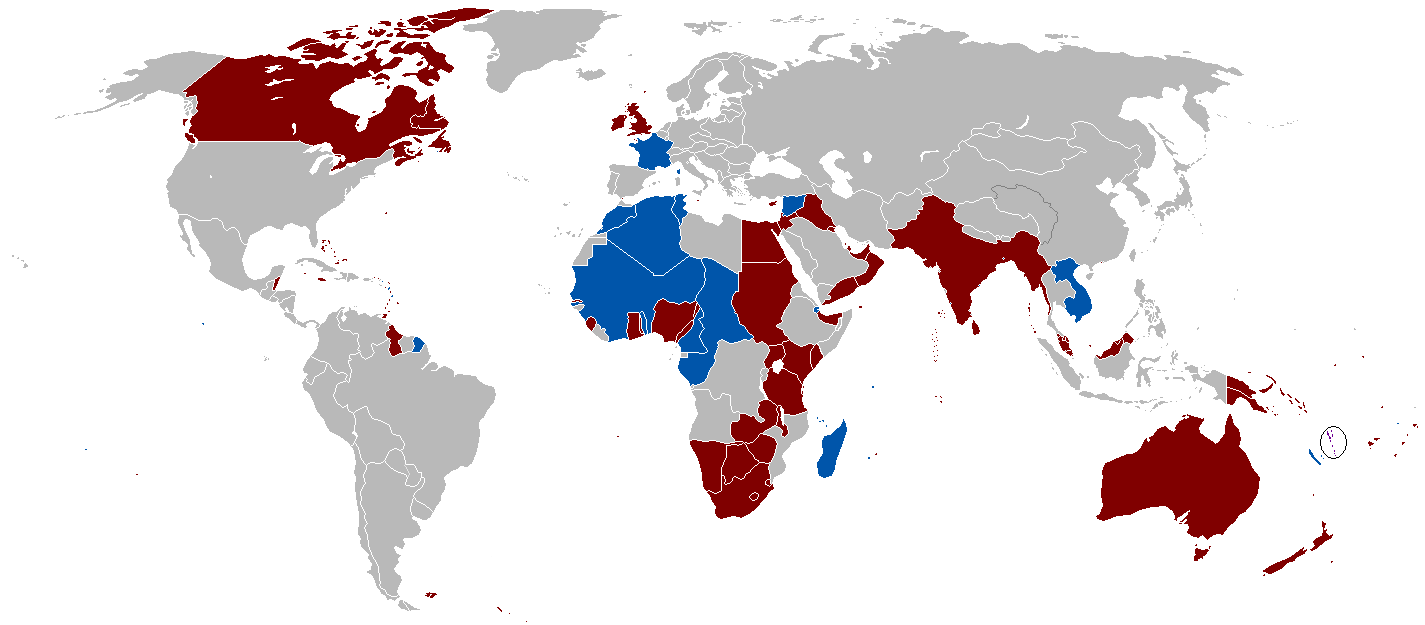
The British and French colonial empires in 1920

=== United Kingdom ===
The UK was a troubled giant that was less of a dominant diplomatic force in the 1920s than before. It often had to give way to the United States, which frequently exercised its financial superiority. The main themes of British foreign policy include a role at the Paris Peace Conference of 1919, where Prime Minister Lloyd George worked hard to moderate French demands for revenge. He was partly successful, but Britain repeatedly had to restrain the French regarding Germany. Britain was an active member of the new League of Nations, but repeated frustration was the main result.

Politically the coalition government headed by Lloyd George, a Liberal, depended primarily on Conservative Party support. He increasingly antagonized his dwindling base of Liberals supporters by working mostly with Conservatives, and he antagonized his main base of Conservative supporters by foreign policy miscues. The Chanak Crisis of 1922 brought Britain to the brink of war with Turkey, but the Dominions were divided and the British military was hesitant. Lloyd George's aggressive policy was rejected in favour of peace and he lost control of the coalition. He was replaced as prime minister and never held power again.

Britain maintained close relationships with France and the United States, rejected isolationism, and sought world peace through naval arms limitation treaties. It sought peace with Germany through the Locarno treaties of 1925. A main goal was to restore Germany to a prosperous and peaceful state.

The Dominions (Canada, Australia, South Africa, and New Zealand) achieved virtual independence in foreign policy in 1931, though each depended heavily upon British naval protection. After 1931 trade policy favoured the Commonwealth with tariffs against the US and others. Relations with the independent Irish Free State remained chilly, with a trade war underway in 1932–1937.

The success at Locarno in handling the German question encouraged Foreign Secretary Austen Chamberlain, working with France and Italy, to find a master solution to the diplomatic problems of Eastern Europe and the Balkans. It proved impossible to overcome mutual antagonisms, because Chamberlain's program was flawed by his misperceptions and fallacious judgments.

Disarmament was high on the agenda, and Britain played a major role following the American lead in the Washington Naval Conference of 1921. The goal was naval disarmament of the major powers and it worked until 1933. Then disarmament collapsed and the issue became the risk of war with Germany.

Britain faced a large debt of money to the US Treasury it borrowed to fight the war. Washington refused to cancel the debt but in 1923 the British renegotiated its £978 million war debt. It promised regular payments of £34 million for ten years then £40 million for 52 years, at a reduced interest rate. Britain supported the international solution to German payments through the Dawes Plan, which stabilized Germany's economy sufficiently to allow it to borrow from New York banks in order to pay reparations – money that Britain and France then used to pay against war debts owed to the US. In 1931, all German payments ended as a result of the Great Depression, and in 1932 Britain suspended its payments to the US. The German and British debts were finally repaid in 1952.

==== Labour Party ====
In domestic British politics, the fast-rising Labour Party had a distinctive and suspicious foreign policy based on pacifism. Its leaders believed that peace was impossible because of capitalism, secret diplomacy, and the trade in armaments. That is it stressed material factors that ignored the psychological memories of the Great War, and the highly emotional tensions regarding nationalism and the boundaries of the countries. Nevertheless, party leader Ramsay MacDonald as Prime Minister (1924, 1929–1935) spent much of his attention on European policies. In his 10 months as Prime Minister 1924 he established the basic tenets of British foreign policy for the next dozen years. He had been a strong opponent of entering the First World War, and in the unhappy aftermath many observers thought he had been vindicated. Incessant French demands against Germany annoyed the British leadership, and undermined the bilateral relationship with France. MacDonald made it a matter of high principle to dispense even-handed justice between France and Germany, saying, "let them put their demands in such a way that Great Britain could say that she supported both sides." MacDonald played a key role in enabling acceptance of the Dawes plan, and worked hard to make the League of Nations dream a reality. In his 10 months as Prime Minister in 1924, he set the course of British foreign policy MacDonald, and his Labour Party had a strong record of fighting communists for control union activities. In foreign affairs, however, he came to a détente with Russia and officially recognized it in 1924. A frustrating issue was repayment of British loans to Russia during the war; Moscow said it would pay only if given a loan. There was strong opposition inside Britain, so discussion focused on a commercial treaty with Russia. Just days before the 1924 general election, the media released a bombshell document signed by Grigory Zinoviev, the head of the Communist International (COMINTERN) in Moscow, ordering the British Communist Party to engage in all sorts of seditious activities. Historians agree the letter was a clever forgery, and that it disrupted the campaign, but that it did not decide the election, which was won by the Conservatives. The most negative impact on Labour was its post-election focus on trickery rather than its own structural weaknesses.

==== Great Depression ====
The Great Depression starting in 1929 put enormous pressure on the British economy. Britain move toward imperial preference, which meant low tariffs among the Commonwealth of Nations, and higher barriers toward trade with outside countries. The flow of money from New York dried up, and the system of reparations and payment of old war debt died in 1931. The disarmament efforts of the 1920s stopped and most of the major nations rearmed.

==== Appeasement of Germany and Italy ====
Vivid memories of the horrors and deaths of the World War inclined many Britons—and their leaders in all parties—to pacifism in the interwar era. This led directly to the appeasement of dictators in order to avoid their threats of war.

The challenge came from dictators, first Benito Mussolini of Italy, then Adolf Hitler of a much more powerful Nazi Germany. The League of Nations proved disappointing to its supporters; it was unable to resolve any of the threats posed by the dictators. British policy was to "appease" them in the hopes they would be satiated. By 1938, it was clear that war was looming, and that Germany had the world's most powerful military. The final act of appeasement came when Britain and France sacrificed Czechoslovakia to Hitler's demands at the Munich Agreement of 1938. Instead of satiation Hitler menaced Poland, and at last Prime Minister Neville Chamberlain dropped appeasement and stood firm in promising to defend Poland. Hitler, however, cut a deal with Joseph Stalin to divide Eastern Europe; when Germany did invade Poland in September 1939, Britain and France declared war; the British Commonwealth followed London's lead.

==== Dominions and the Statute of Westminster ====
Legislative independence of the dominions from the United Kingdom occurred in the years after the passage of the Statute of Westminster 1931 in the British parliament. The statute declared the dominions of the British Empire as "autonomous communities," that was "equal in status, [and] in no way subordinate to one another in any aspect of their domestic or external affairs." The Act gave legal recognition to the de facto independence of the dominions, going into effect almost immediately after its passage in the dominions of Canada, the Irish Free State, and South Africa. However, the Statute of Westminster did not immediately apply to the dominions of Australia, Newfoundland, and New Zealand; with Section 10 of the statute outlining that the enactment of the Act was dependent the aforementioned realms ratifying the Statute of Westminster in their local parliaments. (Note: Australia passed the Statute of Westminster Adoption Act 1942 on 9 October 1942, although made retroactive to 3 September 1939. New Zealand passed the Statute of Westminster Adoption Act 1947 on 25 November 1947. The Statute of Westminster was never ratified by the Dominion of Newfoundland, which joined Canadian confederation in 1949.)

=== France ===
The main goal of French foreign policy between the wars was the diplomatic response to the demands of the French army in the 1920s and 1930s to form alliances against the German threat, especially with Britain and with smaller countries in central Europe.

==== 1920s ====
France had a policy of active interventions, as in Russia (1918–1920), and the Rhineland following the Armistice. France wanted Poland and provided support in the Polish–Soviet War. It supported Spain in the Rif War. From 1925 to 1932, Aristide Briand, was prime minister off and on. He supported Weimar Germany and the League of Nations. He realized France was too weak to handle Germany and was dubious about British support. The solution was alliances with small weak countries called the "Little Entente".

In January 1923, as a response to the failure of the Germans to ship enough coal as part of its reparations, France (and Belgium) occupied the industrial region of the Ruhr. Germany responded with passive resistance including printing vast amounts of marks to pay for the occupation, thereby causing runaway inflation. Inflation heavily damaged the German middle class (because their bank accounts became worthless) but it also damaged the French franc. France fomented a separatist movement pointing to an independent buffer state, but it collapsed after some bloodshed. The intervention was a failure, and in summer 1924 France accepted the international solution to the reparations issues as expressed in the Dawes Plan.

In the 1920s, France established an elaborate system of static border defences called the Maginot Line, designed to fight off any German attack. It followed the German border but did not extend north into Belgium. Germany attacked through Belgium in 1940 and marched around the Maginot Line .

==== 1930s ====
Appeasement was increasingly adopted as Germany grew stronger after 1933, for France suffered a stagnant economy, unrest in its colonies, and bitter internal political fighting. Appeasement, says Martin Thomas, was not a coherent diplomatic strategy nor a copying of the British. France appeased Italy on the Ethiopia question because it could not afford to risk an alliance between Italy and Germany.

When Hitler sent troops into the Rhineland—the part of Germany where no troops were allowed—neither Paris nor London would risk war, and nothing was done.

Appeasement of Germany, in cooperation with Britain, was the policy after 1936, as France sought peace even in the face of Hitler's escalating demands. Édouard Daladier refused to go to war against Germany and Italy without British support as Neville Chamberlain wanted to save peace using the Munich Agreement in 1938. France's military alliance with Czechoslovakia was sacrificed at Hitler's demand when France and Britain agreed to his terms at Munich in 1938.

The Blum government joined Britain in establishing an arms embargo during the Spanish Civil War (1936–1939). Blum rejected support for the Spanish Republicans because of his fear that civil war might spread to deeply divided France. As the Republican cause faltered in Spain, Blum secretly supplied the Republican cause with arms, funds and sanctuaries. Financial support in military cooperation with Poland was also a policy. The government nationalized arms suppliers, and dramatically increased its program of rearming the French military in a last-minute catch up with the Germans.

French foreign policy in the 1920s and 1930s aimed to build military alliances with small nations in Eastern Europe in order to counter the threat of German attacks. Paris saw Romania as an ideal partner in this venture, especially in 1926 to 1939. During World War II, the alliance failed. Romania was first neutral and then after Germany defeated France in 1940 and the Soviet Union annexed Northern Bukovina and all of Bessarabia it aligned with Germany. The main device France had used was arms sales in order to strengthen Romania and ensure its goodwill. French military promises were vague and not trusted after the sellout of Czechoslovakia at Munich in 1938, By 1938, France needed all the arms it could produce. Meanwhile, Germany was better poised to build strong economic ties. In 1938–1939, France made a final effort to guarantee Romanian borders because it calculated that Germany needed Romanian oil, but Romania decided war with Germany would be hopeless and so it veered toward Berlin.

=== Fascism ===
Fascism is a form of radical authoritarian nationalism in Europe shortly after the First World War. It dominated Italy (1923–1943) and Nazi Germany (1933–1945) and played a role in other countries. It was based in tightly organised local groups, all controlled from the top. It violently opposed to liberalism, Marxism, and anarchism, and tried to control all aspects of society. The foreign policy Militaristic and aggressive. Fascist Italy and Nazi Germany were critical allies in the second world war. Japan, with an authoritarian government that did not have a well-mobilised popular base, was allied with them to form the Axis.

Fascists saw World War I as a revolution that brought massive changes to the nature of war, society, the state, and technology. The advent of total war and the total mass mobilization of society had broken down the distinction between civilians and combatants. A "military citizenship" arose in which all citizens were involved with the military in some manner during the war. The war had resulted in the rise of a powerful state capable of mobilizing millions of people to serve on the front lines and providing economic production and logistics to support them, as well as having unprecedented authority to intervene in the lives of citizens.

Fascists argue that liberal democracy is obsolete, and they regard the complete mobilization of society under a totalitarian one-party state as necessary to prepare a nation for armed conflict and to respond effectively to economic difficulties. Opposition parties or organizations or publications are not tolerated. Such a state is led by a strong leader—such as a dictator his fascist party—to forge national unity and maintain a stable and orderly society without dissent. Fascism rejects assertions that violence is automatically negative in nature, and views political violence and warfare as tools that can achieve national rejuvenation.

Hitler re-militarised Germany's Rhineland district in 1936 in defiance of the Treaty of Versailles which said no troops would be stationed there. France and Britain did nothing. Hitler discovered that threats and bold moves paid off, and he escalated demands against Austria, Czechoslovakia and Poland. Finally Britain and France declared war after his invasion of Poland in September 1939. The Second World War had begun.

=== Germany ===
Germany, stripped of its overseas colonies, its Polish regions in the east and Alsace-Lorraine in the West, became a republic in 1919. It was committed to democracy and modernity, but faced internal challenges from the far left and the far right, and external pressures from France.

==== Weimar Germany (1919–1933) ====
In November 1918, the Kaiser and the aristocracy were overthrown. Friedrich Ebert, leader of the Socialists (the Social Democratic Party of Germany or SPD) became Chancellor of Germany, serving until his death in 1925. His moderate faction of the SPD expelled the radical element led by Karl Liebknecht and Rosa Luxemburg. They went on to form a Communist Party, seeking the violent overthrow of the government in the name of the working class. In January 1919, communists led the Spartacist uprising in Berlin, Bremen, Braunschweig, and the Ruhr. The Army was largely demobilized, but many veterans volunteered to form Freikorps ("free corps") which supported Ebert and his defense minister Gustav Noske. They easily crushed the poorly organized uprisings. Liebknecht and Luxemburg were killed, leading to a permanent breach between socialists and communists that was never healed. In Bavaria, a communist revolt created the short lived Bavarian Socialist Republic on 6 April 1919. It was suppressed by the Army and the Freikorps the following month.

===== Reparations =====
The Versailles Treaty required Germany to pay reparations for the damage it did during the war. Germany tried to have the obligation revised downward, but France used military force and occupied German industrial areas, making reparations the "chief battleground of the post-war era" and "the focus of the power struggle between France and Germany over whether the Versailles Treaty was to be enforced or revised".

The Treaty of Versailles and the 1921 London Schedule of Payments required Germany to pay 132 billion gold marks (US$33 billion) in reparations to cover civilian damage caused during the war. This figure was divided into three categories of bonds: A, B, and C. Of these, Germany was only required to pay towards 'A' and 'B' bonds totaling 50 billion marks (US$12.5 billion). The remaining 'C' bonds, which Germany did not have to pay, were designed to deceive the Anglo-French public into believing Germany was being heavily fined and punished for the war.

Due to shortfalls in reparation payments by Germany, France occupied the Ruhr in 1923 to enforce payments, causing an international crisis. It was resolved by international intervention in the form of the Dawes Plan in 1924. Among much else, it provided a loan to help stabilize Germany's currency and lowered annual reparations payments. That enabled Germany to borrow from American banks, which allowed it to meet its reparations payments. In 1928 the Dawes Plan was replaced by the Young Plan, which established the German reparation requirements at 112 billion marks (US$26.3 billion) and created a schedule of payments that would see Germany complete payments by 1988. As a result of the severe impact of the Great Depression on the German economy, reparations were suspended for a year in 1931. A treaty to further reduce reparations was agreed on at the 1932 Lausanne Conference, but it failed to be ratified by the countries involved and payments were not restarted. Between 1919 and 1932, Germany paid an estimated 36.1 billion marks in reparations. After 1953 West Germany paid the entire remaining balance.

The German people saw reparations as a national humiliation; the German Government worked to undermine the validity of the Treaty of Versailles and the requirement to pay. British economist John Maynard Keynes called the treaty a Carthaginian peace that would economically destroy Germany. His arguments had a profound effect on historians, politicians, and the public at large in Britain and elsewhere. Despite Keynes' arguments and those by later historians supporting or reinforcing Keynes' views, the consensus of contemporary historians is that reparations were not as intolerable as the Germans or Keynes had suggested and were within Germany's capacity to pay had there been the political will to do so.

===== Rapallo and Locarno Treaties =====
Apart from the reparations issue, Germany's highest priority was normalizing its relations with its neighbors. The new policy was to turn east for a new friendship with the communist Soviet Union In 1922, they signed the Treaty of Rapallo. The Soviets for the first time were recognized; it opened the way for large scale trade. Moscow secretly allowed Germany to train soldiers and airmen in exchange for giving Russia military technology.

==== Nazi Germany (1933–1945) ====
Hitler and his Nazis turned Germany into a dictatorship with a highly hostile outlook toward the Treaty of Versailles and Jews. It solved its unemployment crisis by heavy military spending.

Hitler's diplomatic tactics were to make seemingly reasonable demands, then threatening war if they were not met; concessions were made, he accepted them and moved onto a new demand. When opponents tried to appease him, he accepted the gains that were offered, then went to the next target. That aggressive strategy worked as Germany pulled out of the League of Nations (1933), rejected the Versailles Treaty and began to re-arm (1935) with the Anglo-German Naval Agreement, won back the Saar (1935), re-militarized the Rhineland (1936), formed an alliance ("axis") with Mussolini's Italy (1936), sent massive military aid to Franco in the Spanish Civil War (1936–1939), seized Austria (1938), took over Czechoslovakia after the British and French appeasement of the Munich Agreement of 1938, formed a peace pact with Stalin's Russia in August 1939, and finally invaded Poland in September 1939.

==== 1933–1935 ====
Hitler and the leading Nazis had little diplomatic experience before they came to power in January 1933, and they moved slowly in that arena, concentrating on a total takeover of the power centers inside Germany. The first external move was to cripple a disarmament conference that was underway in Geneva, by rejecting troop limitations. The Germans insisted that the Nazi storm troopers should not be counted in any quota system. Although Britain, France, Italy, and the United States were ready to freeze armaments for four years, the Germans insisted on having "defensive weapons" immediately.

Germany quit the disarmament conference and the League in October 1933 but even then few European leaders (apart from Winston Churchill) saw Hitler as an enemy or threat to peace. For example, Eric Phipps the British ambassador 1933–1937 eagerly promoted policies, later known as appeasement. He believed that the League of Nations Was the key to preventing the next war, and tried to enlist the French in efforts to get the Germans to cooperate. Mussolini was also eager to cooperate with Hitler, and succeeded in getting the German signature on the Four-Power Pact, between Britain, France, Italy, and Germany. The Pact failed, and after Hitler visited Mussolini in Rome, they had a falling out over German intentions to take over Austria. Britain and France tried for the next several years to attract Italy more to their side than to Germany's. In January 1934 Germany signed a non-aggression pact with Poland, which disrupted the French network of anti-German alliances in Eastern Europe. In March 1935, Hitler denounced the requirement of German disarmament contained in the Versailles Treaty of 1919. Germany and Britain came to terms in June 1935, in the Anglo-German Naval Agreement. Germany promised to limit their naval expansion to 35 percent of the British, thereby driving a wedge between Britain and France.

Americans had a deep negative attitude toward Hitler and the Nazis, and relations steadily deteriorated over trade disputes, anti-Jewish demonstrations, and rearmament. Washington decided that German foreign policy primarily reflected two factors: its internal economic problems and Hitler's expansionist dreams. Meanwhile, the new Roosevelt administration opened relations with the Soviet Union on a basis of détente, along with the promise there would be no espionage.

=== Eastern Europe ===
A major result of the First World War was the breakup of the Russian, Austro-Hungarian, and Ottoman Empires, as well as partial losses to the German Empire. A surge of ethnic nationalism created a series of new states in Eastern Europe, validated by the Versailles Treaty of 1919. Ukraine, Belarus, Georgia, Armenia, and Azerbaijan tried to do the same but were later retaken by the Bolsheviks in Russia. Czechoslovakia and Yugoslavia became entirely new nations. Austria and Hungary survived with much smaller territories based on their German and Hungarian core populations.

Poland was reconstituted after the partitions of the 1790s had divided it between Germany, Austria, and Russia. Romania, Bulgaria, and Albania survived the tumble, but their borders were adjusted. All the countries were heavily rural, with little industry and only a few urban centers. Nationalism was the dominant force but most of the countries had ethnic or religious minorities who felt threatened by majority elements. Nearly all became democratic in the 1920s, but all of them (except Czechoslovakia and Finland) gave up democracy during the depression years of the 1930s, in favor of autocratic, strong-man or single party states. The new states were unable to form stable military alliances, and one by one were too weak to stand up against Nazi Germany or the Soviet Union, which took them over between 1938 and 1945.

==== Baltic states ====
Estonia, Latvia, and Lithuania successfully broke away from Russia in 1918–1920 and became independent countries. Bolshevik radicals at first held power, especially in Latvia, but were replaced during the 1920s with conservative political coalitions based on ethnic nationalism. The population in the early 1920s ranged from 1.1 million in Estonia, and 1.8 million in Latvia, to 2.2 million in Lithuania. Minorities comprised 12% of the population of Estonia, 27% in Latvia, and 20% in Lithuania. Each was heavily rural, especially Lithuania. Each privileged its main ethnic majority and its language and religion. They all had to deal with a mosaic of minorities: Germans, Jews, Belarusians, Russians, and Poles. The minorities had different languages, religions, and cultures. The Germans generally were the main landowners. There were outside attempts to incite separatist movements, with little success. The Baltic governments limited the rights and privileges of the minorities, but the minorities had enough solidarity to resist assimilation. These attempts caused an unfavorable international reaction. Poland's seizure of Vilnius outraged the Lithuanians and made impossible any coordination or diplomatic cooperation among the three countries.

All three survived until 1939–40, when they were taken over by the Soviet Union and the local leadership was suppressed, executed or escaped into exile. The Germans invaded in 1941 and were expelled in 1944. After additional purges large numbers of Russians were resettled in Estonia and Latvia, and smaller numbers in Lithuania.

==== Greece ====
Greek troops occupied Smyrna area and also areas north of Constantinople.

In Greece, the site of several revanchist wars in the years prior to the First World War, the divided international loyalties of the political elite reached a crisis over entering the World War against its historic enemy, the Ottoman Empire. During what was known as the National Schism, a pro-British, liberal, and nationalist movement led by Eleftherios Venizelos struggled with the conservative and pro-German monarch Constantine I for control.

Greek troops seized Smyrna and a large sector of western Anatonia in 1919. They had British support. In 1920, the Ottoman government agreed to the Treaty of Sèvres; it stipulated that in five years time a plebiscite would be held in Smyrna on whether the region would join Greece. However, Turkish nationalists, led by Mustafa Kemal Atatürk, overthrew the Ottoman government and tried to expel the Greeks in the Greco-Turkish War (1919–1922). A major Greek offensive ground to a halt in 1921, and by 1922 Greek troops were in retreat. The Turkish forces recaptured Smyrna and drove out all the Greek forces. The war with Turkey ended with an agreement to stage massive ethnic exchange, with 1.1 million ethnic Greek Christians who had lived in what was now Turkey (and perhaps could not speak Greek) moving back to Greece, and 380,000 Muslims moving to Turkey.

==== Hungary ====
In the chaos of 1919, Hungarian communists, encouraged by Moscow, overthrew the government and established the Hungarian Soviet Republic on 21 March 1919. Béla Kun was officially the foreign minister but in practice was the new leader. His regime nationalized industry and finance but made the mistake of not redistributing land to the peasants. The plan was to establish a large-scale collective farms managed by the old landlord class. Dissent grew but was violently suppressed in the Red Terror. Hungary was soon at war with Romania and Czechoslovakia, both aided by France, and the regime collapsed in August 1919. The "white" counter-revolutionaries, rooted in the landowning class, came to power under Admiral Miklós Horthy, an authoritarian ruler from 1920 to his arrest in 1944. They used force to suppress the remnants of the revolutionaries.

In the 1920 Treaty of Trianon, Hungary lost a great deal of historic territory and resources, with many ethnic Hungarians now located in other countries. Ethnic Hungarians wanted a restoration of their status. Hungarians stranded elsewhere formed organizations to maintain their identity, such as Czechoslovakia's St. George Scout Circle (later called "Sarló" ) and Romania's Transylvanian Youth (Erdélyi Fiatalok). One result was closeness to fascist Italy and Nazi Germany, which promised to restore lost territories.

==== Franco-British failed alliance with Moscow ====
After the German occupation of Prague in March 1939, in violation of the Munich agreement, the Chamberlain government in Britain sought Soviet and French support for a Peace Front. The goal was to deter further Nazi aggression by guaranteeing the independence of Poland and Romania. However Stalin refused to pledge Soviet support for these guarantees unless Britain and France first concluded a military alliance with the USSR. In London, the cabinet decided to seek such an alliance. However the western negotiators in Moscow in August 1939 lacked urgency. The talks were poorly conducted at a slow pace by diplomats with little authority, such as William Strang, an assistant under-secretary. Stalin also insisted on British and French guarantees to Finland, the Baltic states, Poland, and Romania against indirect German aggression. Those countries, however, became fearful that Moscow wanted to control them. Although Hitler was escalating threats against Poland, it refused under any circumstances to allow Soviet troops to cross its borders. Historian Michael Jabara Carley argues that the British were too committed to anti-communism to trust Stalin. Meanwhile, Stalin simultaneously was secretly negotiating with the Germans. He was attracted to a much better deal by Hitler—control of most of Eastern Europe and decided to sign the Molotov–Ribbentrop Pact.

=== Soviet Union ===
==== Allied intervention in Russia 1918–1920 ====
France, Britain, Japan, the United States led an armed intervention into Russia during the last year of World War I and the Russian Civil War. The goals were to block German advances, then help the Czechoslovak Legion in securing supplies of munitions and armaments in Russian ports. At times between 1918 and 1920, the Czechoslovak Legion controlled the entire Trans-Siberian Railway and several major cities in Siberia. By 1919, the goal was to help the White forces in the Russian Civil War. When the Whites collapsed, the forces were withdrawn by 1920 (or 1922 in the case of Japan). The Soviet government until its collapse in 1991 made the episode a feature of their anti-Western propaganda. Allied troops also landed in Arkhangelsk and in Vladivostok as part of the North Russia Intervention.

Allied efforts were hampered by divided objectives and war-weariness from World War I. These factors, together with the evacuation of the Czechoslovak Legion in September 1920, compelled the Allied powers to end the North Russia and Siberian interventions in 1920, though the Japanese intervention in Siberia continued until 1922 and the Japan continued to occupy the northern half of Sakhalin island until 1925.

Historian John Thompson argues that while the intervention failed to stop the Bolshevik revolution in Russia, it did prevent its spread to Central Europe:

However, it did succeed and so thoroughly engaging the forces of revolutionary expansionism that the countries of war-torn eastern and central Europe, potentially most susceptible to the Bolshevik contagion, were able to recover enough social and economic balance to withstand Bolshevism. The interventionist attempt left an ugly legacy of fear and suspicion to future relations between Russia and the other great powers, and it strengthened the hand of those among the Bolshevik leadership who were striving to impose monolithic unity and unquestioning obedience on the Russian people.

==== Soviet foreign policy ====
Soviet foreign policy went through a series of stages. The first stage from late 1917 into 1922 involved defeating foreign interventions, and an internal Civil War. The Soviets maintained control over much of the former Russian Empire, and regained control over the Transcaucasian republics. They lost Finland, Poland and the Baltics, which remained independent until the Second World War. They regained control of the eastern half of Ukraine in 1921 after a short war with Poland. There was a short war in 1919–20 with Romania. Flushed with victory, Lenin, Trotsky, and the other leaders in Moscow were convinced that they represented the wave of the future, and that with a little help provided by the Communist International (Comintern), headed by Grigory Zinoviev they could spark anti-capitalist revolutions across the globe. However the interventions were all failures. In most cases the insurgents were quickly defeated by the established national forces. A communist-socialist coalition came to power in Hungary, with communist Béla Kun becoming the dictator. The Romanians invaded and overthrew his regime in early August 1919. In Berlin, the communist forces under the Spartacist red banner led revolts in Berlin, Munich and the Ruhr that were quickly crushed by the army in a matter of days.

The long series of defeats produced a cordon sanitaire or chain of buffer states. The USSR had become a pariah state and the second stage was to work around that bad reputation. Its size and economic importance facilitated making trade agreements (which did not include official diplomatic recognition) with Britain, Italy, Austria, Germany, and Norway in 1921. The Treaty of Rapallo, 1922 with Germany—another pariah state—opened up trade and recognition. It secretly allowed large-scale military training for German forces in hidden Soviet military installations. The New Economic Policy (1921–1928) allowed a limited capitalism in the USSR and led to invitations to foreign corporations to do business. Henry Ford and his experts came from Detroit and built modern factories at GAZ; Ford was convinced that commerce made for peace.

==== Joseph Stalin ====
Lenin was incapacitated by 1922 and died in 1924. Joseph Stalin gradually took power, and rejected the goal of sponsoring communist uprisings. In 1924, came recognition by Britain, Italy, France, and Japan. Stalin removed Zinoniev and purged Trotsky and his hard-line allies who preached world revolution. The first priority, said Stalin, was expressed in the official slogan, "Socialism in One Country." In 1928, the NEP experiment with capitalism was ended.

Britain had formally recognised the USSR on 1 February 1924. However, the fake Zinoviev letter was believed in Britain and caused a chill. Diplomatic relations were severed at the end of May 1927 after prime minister Stanley Baldwin presented the House of Commons with deciphered Soviet telegrams that proved Soviet espionage activities. In 1929, the incoming Labour government successfully established permanent diplomatic relations.

At the Sixth World Congress of the Communist International in 1928, Stalin issued orders that across the world Communist parties would never be allowed to cooperate with Socialists or other leftist parties—they were all "social fascists" and were as evil as the capitalists because they were enemies of the proletariat. Communists infiltrated and tried to seize control of labour unions and the Socialists fought back as hard as they could.

In a return to normal relations with nearby states, in 1932 Stalin signed non-aggression treaties with the cordon sanitaire states of Poland, Estonia, Latvia, Finland, and France. The USSR joined the League of Nations in 1934. The United States was the last major country to recognize the Soviet state. Recognition in 1933 was popular in the US; businessmen planned for large-scale trade, but it never materialized.

==== Popular front ====
Communists and parties on the left were increasingly threatened by the growth of the Nazi movement. Hitler came to power in January 1933 and rapidly consolidated his control over Germany, destroyed the communist and socialist movements in Germany, and rejected the restraints imposed by the Versailles treaty. Stalin in 1934 reversed his decision in 1928 to attack socialists, and introduced his new plan: the "popular front". It was a coalition of anti-fascist parties usually organized by the local Communists acting under instructions from the Comintern. The new policy was to work with all parties on the left and center in a multiparty coalition against fascism and Nazi Germany in particular. The new slogan was: "The People's Front Against Fascism and War". Under this policy, communist parties were instructed to form broad alliances with all anti-fascist parties with the aim of both securing social advance at home and a military alliance with the USSR to isolate the fascist dictatorships. The "Popular Fronts" thus formed proved to be successful in only a few countries, and only for a few years each, forming the government in France, Chile and Spain, and also China. It was not a political success elsewhere. The popular front approach played a major role in resistance movements in France and other countries conquered by Germany after 1939. In the post-war period, it even had some influence on French and Italian politics.

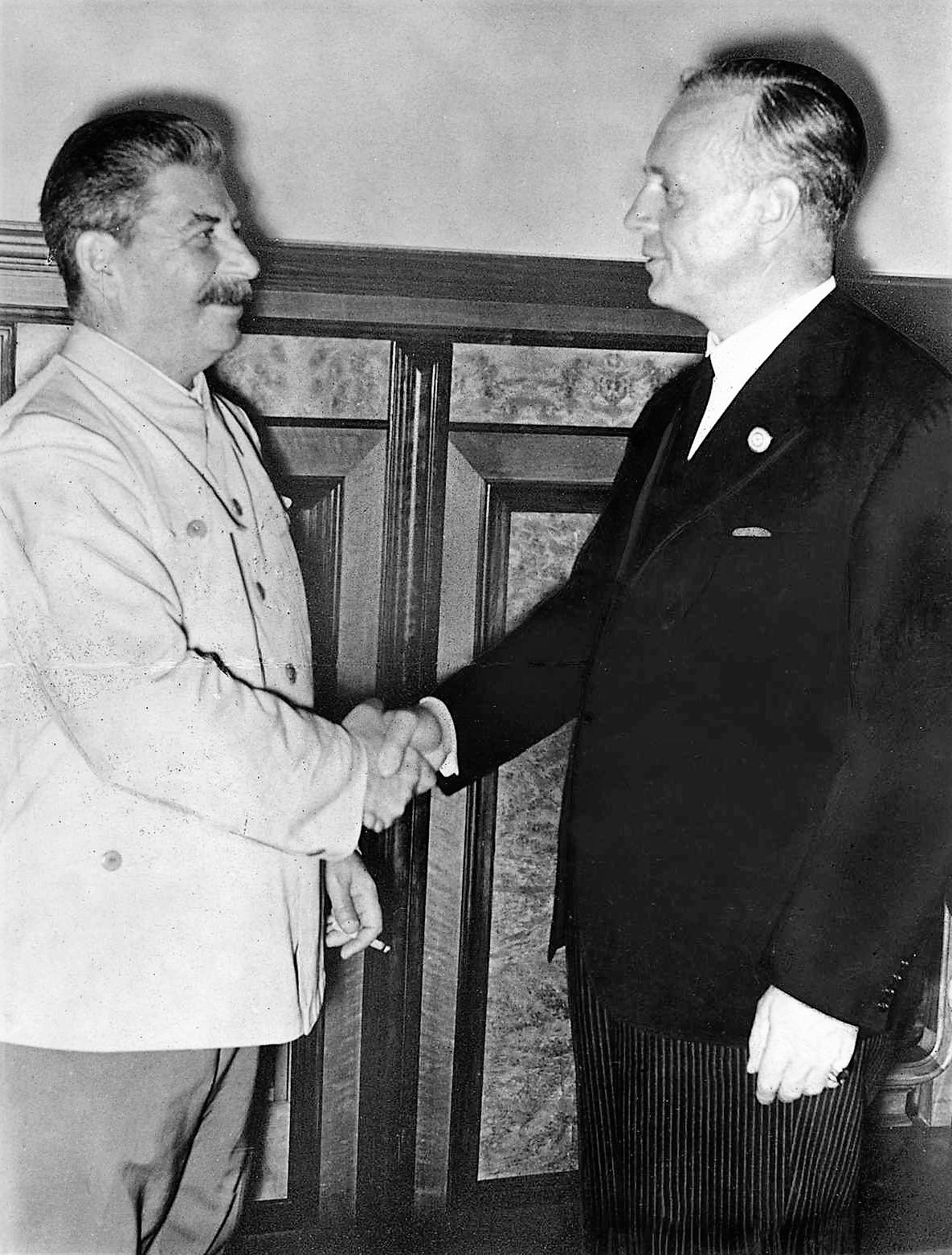
Stalin and Ribbentrop shaking hands after the signing of the pact in Moscow in August 1939.

In 1938–1939, the Soviet Union attempted to form strong military alliances with Germany's enemies, including France, and Great Britain. The effort failed, and the last stage unfolded to the astonishment of the world: Stalin and Hitler came to terms. Historian François Furet says, "The pact signed in Moscow by Ribbentrop and Molotov on 23 August 1939 inaugurated the alliance between the USSR and Nazi Germany. It was presented as an alliance and not just a nonaggression pact." The secret covenants agreed on a mutual division of Poland, and split up Eastern Europe, with the USSR taking over the Baltic states. The USSR helped supply oil and munitions to Germany as its armies rolled across Western Europe in May–June 1940. Despite repeated warnings, Stalin refused to believe that Hitler was planning an all-out war on the USSR. It came in June 1941.

==== Ukraine ====
Ukraine was a complex ethnic mix, comprising Ukrainians, Russians, Jews, Poles, and other minorities and lacking a strong sense of nationalism. The social, political, cultural, and economic elites were based in the major cities, espoused Russian nationalism, and were generally indifferent or hostile to Ukrainian nationalism. Peasants on the other hand, were strongly in favor of independence in order to redistribute the land. Ukraine tried to break free from Russia after the February 1917 revolution in Saint Petersburg. The leadership was young, ideological, hostile to capitalism and landowners, and inexperienced. It did not realize the necessity of a strong army—it turned down a force of 40,000 trained soldiers as unnecessary—nor the need to build infrastructure and public support in the rural areas.

Outside powers acted on entirely different visions for Ukraine. The British ridiculed the pretensions of the new nation. White Russians, united only by their opposition to Bolshevism, wanted to restore Ukraine as a Russian province. Russian Bolsheviks did not believe in nationalism and twice invaded Ukraine in failed efforts to seize control and collectivize the farms; they succeeded the third time in 1920. Americans were outraged at the large-scale massacres of Jews in 1919. Germany supported Ukrainian nationalism as a foil to Russia, but its chief goal was to obtain urgently needed food supplies. Ukraine was too poorly organized to fulfill the promised food shipments. Poland wanted Ukraine in order to build a population that could stand up against Germany. France wanted Poland as a strong anti-German ally and therefore supported Polish ambitions. Poland did seize Ukraine in 1919, but was driven out in the Polish–Soviet War in 1920.

Historian Paul Kubicek states:

Between 1917 and 1920, several entities that aspired to be independent Ukrainian states came into existence. This period, however, was extremely chaotic, characterized by revolution, international and civil war, and lack of strong central authority. Many factions competed for power in the area that is today's Ukraine, and not all groups desired a separate Ukrainian state. Ultimately, Ukrainian independence was short-lived, as most Ukrainian lands were incorporated into the Soviet Union and the remainder, in western Ukraine, was divided among Poland, Czechoslovakia, and Romania.

A Canadian scholar Orest Subtelny provides a context from the long span of European history:

In 1919 total chaos engulfed Ukraine. Indeed, in the modern history of Europe no country experienced such complete anarchy, bitter civil strife, and total collapse of authority as did Ukraine at this time. Six different armies—those of the Ukrainians, the Bolsheviks, the Whites, the Entente [French], the Poles and the anarchists—operated on its territory. Kiev changed hands five times in less than a year. Cities and regions were cut off from each other by the numerous [military] fronts. Communications with the outside world broke down almost completely. The starving cities emptied as people moved into the countryside in their search for food.

The Ukrainian War of Independence of 1917 to 1921 produced the Ukrainian Soviet Socialist Republic (in 1919 merged from the Ukrainian People's Republic and West Ukrainian People's Republic) which joined the Soviet Union in 1922.

=== Spanish Civil War ===
The Spanish Civil War exposed political divisions across Europe. The right and the Catholics supported the Nationalists as a way to stop the expansion of Bolshevism. On the left, including labor unions, students and intellectuals, the war represented a necessary battle to stop the spread of fascism and support the cause of the Spanish Republicans. Antiwar and pacifist sentiment was strong in many countries, leading to warnings that the Civil War had the potential of escalating into a second world war. In this respect, the war was an indicator of the growing instability across Europe.

The Spanish Civil War involved tens of thousands of outsiders from right and left who came to fight. Italy sent infantry regiments; Germany sent its air force.

Communist elements around the world, working through popular front collaborations with anti-fascist parties but supervised by Moscow, sent volunteers to the "International Brigades." Most of these volunteers were Communist party members, typically with a dedication of their time, energy, and lives To an idealistic cause. Many writers and intellectuals on the left became involved, including Ernest Hemingway, who supported the Republican cause, and George Orwell, who reversed himself and turned sharply anti-Communist. Moscow also sent along a cadre of agents from their secret police force, NKVD and GUM. Their mission was to enforce solidarity and the party line, and to identify and execute left-wing anarchists whose agenda threatened the Stalinist line. The Spanish government in 1937 shipped its entire gold supply (worth over $500 million at the time) to Moscow for safekeeping. This gave Stalin leverage over the Spanish government, as he controlled the payments for all sales of arms to Spain. The gold was never returned.

Britain and France led a coalition of 27 nations that promised non-intervention in the Spanish Civil War, including an embargo on all arms to Spain. The United States unofficially went along. Germany, Italy, and the Soviet Union signed on officially, but ignored the embargo. The attempted suppression of imported materials was largely ineffective, however, and France especially facilitated large shipments to Republican troops. The League of Nations did not try to act.

As the Spanish Civil War progressed, most governments maintained diplomatic relations with the Republicans, but as the Nationalists' imminent victory became apparent, the western democracies had to quickly readjust their diplomacy to prevent a permanent allegiance of the new Spanish government to the eventual Axis powers. The French government, previously a tentative sympathizer of the Republican cause, formed the Bérard-Jordana Agreement with the Spanish Nationalists on 25 February 1939, formally recognizing Franco's government as the legitimate government of Spain. Philippe Pétain, the eventual leader of Vichy France, became France's ambassador to Francoist Spain. The British government recognized the Franco government on the same day, and the United States government followed suit on 7 April 1939. The Franco government maintained an ambiguous stance between the western democracies and the European fascists and joined the German-Japanese Anti-Comintern Pact on 24 March 1939. However, the Spanish government, put off by the German-Soviet cooperation in the Molotov–Ribbentrop Pact in August 1939, ultimately declined open membership in the Axis powers and maintained neutrality in World War II, although Spanish volunteers were allowed to fight for the Axis cause as part of the German 250th Infantry Division.

== United States ==
In the 1920s, American policy was an active involvement in international affairs, while ignoring the League of Nations, setting up numerous diplomatic ventures, and using the enormous financial power of the United States to dictate major diplomatic questions in Europe. There were large-scale humanitarian food aid missions during the war in Belgium, and after it in Germany and Russia, led by Herbert C. Hoover. There was also a major aid to Japan after the 1923 earthquake.

The Republican presidents, Warren Harding, Calvin Coolidge, and Herbert Hoover, avoided any political alliances with anyone else. They operated large-scale American intervention in issues of reparations and disarmament, with little contact with the League of Nations. Jerald Combs reports their administrations in no way returned to 19th-century isolationism. The key Republican leaders:

... including Elihu Root, Charles Evans Hughes, and Hoover himself, were Progressives who accepted much of Wilson's internationalism. ... They did seek to use American political influence and economic power to goad European governments to moderate the Versailles peace terms, induce the Europeans to settle their quarrels peacefully, secure disarmament agreements, and strengthen the European capitalist economies to provide prosperity for them and their American trading partners.

=== Rejection of the World Court ===
The US, played a major role in setting up the "Permanent Court of International Justice", known as the World Court. Presidents Wilson, Harding, Coolidge, and Hoover supported membership but were unable to get a 2/3 majority in the Senate for a treaty. Roosevelt also supported membership, but he did not make it a high priority. Opposition was intense on the issue of losing sovereignty, led by the Hearst newspapers and Father Coughlin. The US never joined. The World Court was replaced by the International Court of Justice (ICJ) in 1945. However, the Connally Amendment of 1944 reserved the right of the US to refuse to abide by its decisions. Margaret A. Rague, argues this reduced the strength of the ICJ, discredited America's image as a proponent of international law, and exemplified the problems created by vesting a reservation power in the Senate.

=== Naval disarmament ===
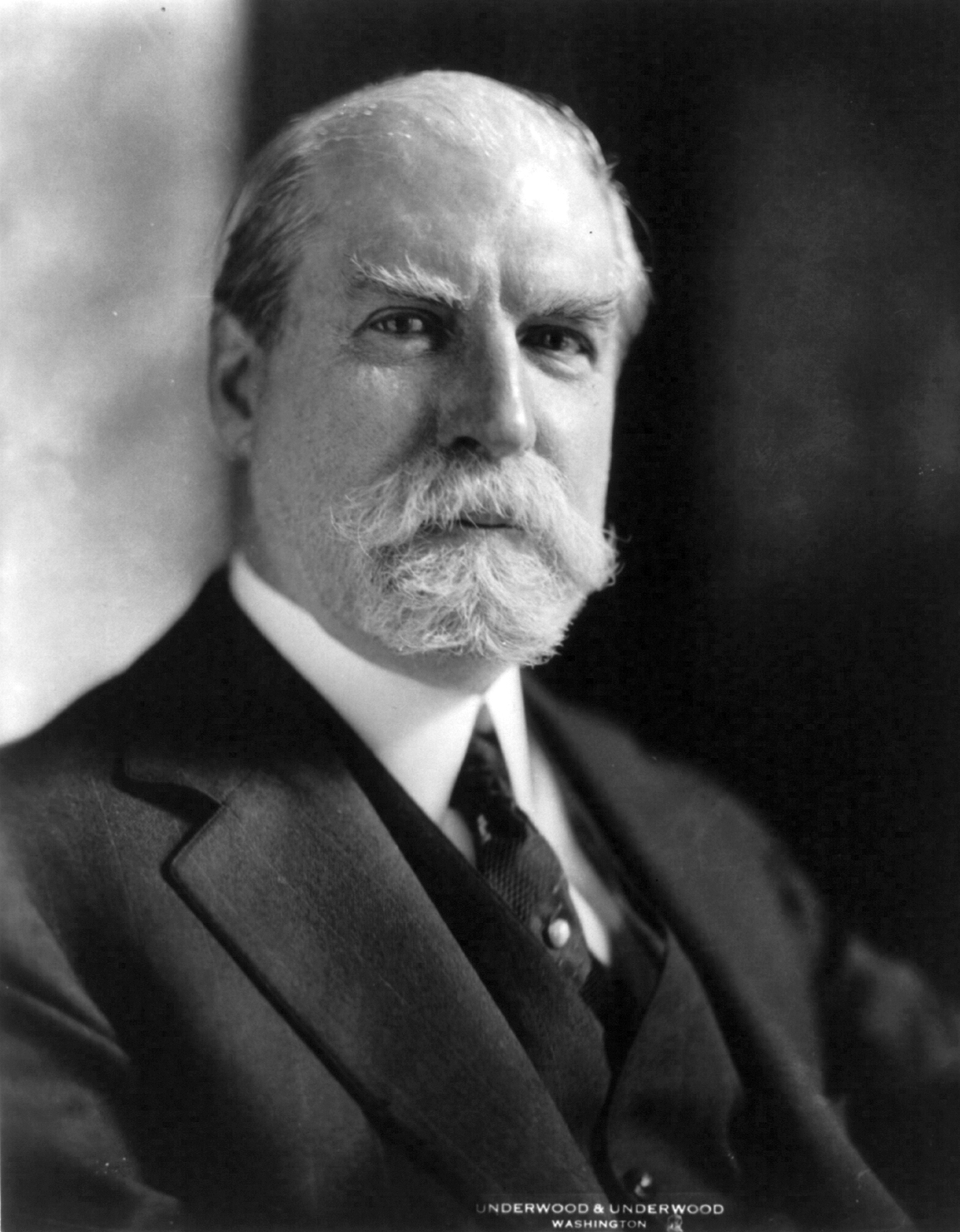
Secretary of State Charles Evans Hughes chaired the Washington Naval Conference in 1921–1922

The Washington Naval Conference (its formal title was "International Conference on Naval Limitation") was the most successful diplomatic venture the 1920s. Promoted by Senator William E. Borah, Republican of Idaho, it had the support of the Harding administration. It was held in Washington, and was chaired by Secretary of State Charles Evans Hughes from 12 November 1921, to 6 February 1922. Conducted outside the auspice of the League of Nations, it was attended by nine nations—the United States, Japan, China, France, Great Britain, Italy, Belgium, the Netherlands, and Portugal. The USSR and Germany were not invited. It focused on resolving misunderstandings or conflicts regarding interests in the Pacific Ocean and East Asia. The main achievement was a series of naval disarmament agreements agreed to by all the participants, that lasted for a decade. It resulted in three major treaties: the Four-Power Treaty, Five-Power Treaty (Washington Naval Treaty), and Nine-Power Treaty, as well as a number of smaller agreements. These treaties preserved peace during the 1920s but were not renewed, as the world scene turned increasingly negative after 1930.

=== Dawes Plan and Young Plan ===
The Dawes Plan was an attempt to find a solution to the crisis of World War I reparations, in which France was demanding that Germany pay strictly according to the London Schedule of Payments. When Germany was declared in default, French and Belgian troops occupied the key industrial Ruhr district in January 1923. Germany responded with a policy of passive resistance and supported the idled workers by printing additional money, spurring the onset of hyperinflation. The immediate crisis was solved by the 1924 Dawes Plan, an international effort chaired by the American banker Charles G. Dawes. It set up a staggered schedule for Germany's payment of war reparations, provided for a large loan to stabilize the German currency and ended the occupation of the Ruhr. It resulted in a brief period of economic recovery in the second half of the 1920s. By 1928, Germany, France, and the US were all interested in a new payment plan, leading to the 1929 Young Plan, named after its chairman, the American Owen D. Young. It established German reparations at 112 billion marks (US$26.3 billion) and created a schedule that would see Germany complete payments by 1988. It was also meant to allow France and Britain to repay the war loans owed to the United States using German reparations. With the onset of the Great Depression, however, the Young Plan crumbled. In 1931, the Hoover administration convinced 15 nations to sign on to suspending reparations for a year, and after Adolf Hitler came to power in 1933, no additional payments were made for 20 years. Between 1919 and 1932, Germany paid less than 21 billion marks in reparations. After 1953, West Germany paid the entire remaining balance.

=== Intervention ends in Latin America ===
Small-scale military interventions continued after 1921 as the Banana Wars tapered off. The Hoover administration began a goodwill policy and withdrew all military forces. President Roosevelt announced the "Good Neighbor policy" by which the United States would no longer intervene to promote good government, but would accept whatever governments were locally chosen. His Secretary of State Cordell Hull endorsed Article 8 of the 1933 Montevideo Convention on Rights and Duties of States; it provides that "no state has the right to intervene in the internal or external affairs of another".

The emerging threat of World War II has forced the US to agree to a compromise solution to Mexican controls over American business properties. The US negotiated an agreement with President Manuel Avila Camacho that amounted to a military alliance.

== Latin America ==
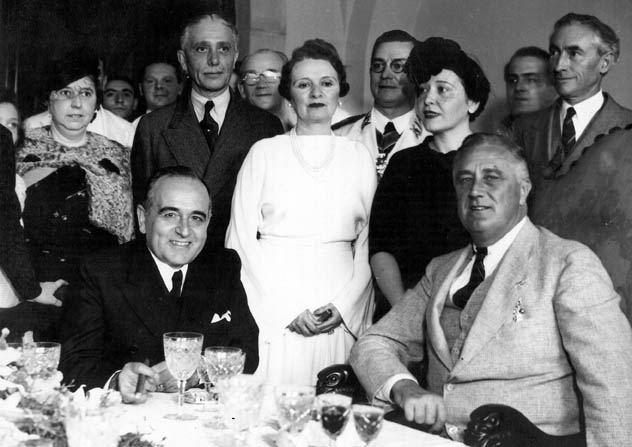
Brazil's President Getúlio Vargas (left) meets with US President Franklin D. Roosevelt (right) in 1936, hoping a good relationship with the United States would deter an attack from Argentina.

The main foreign policy initiative of the United States was the Good Neighbor policy, which was a move toward a more non-interventionist US policy in Latin America. Since the 1890s, Americans had seen this region as an American sphere of influence. American forces were withdrawn from Haiti, and new treaties with Cuba and Panama ended their status as US protectorates. In December 1933, Roosevelt signed the Montevideo Convention on the Rights and Duties of States, renouncing the right to intervene unilaterally in the affairs of Latin American countries. The US repealed the Platt Amendment, freeing Cuba from legal and official interference by the United States.

The Great Depression in Latin America had a devastating impact, as the demand for its raw materials drastically declined, undermining the critical export sector. Chile, Peru, and Bolivia were hardest hit. Intellectuals and government leaders in Latin America turned their backs on the older economic policies and turned toward import substitution industrialization. The goal was to create self-sufficient economies, which would have their own industrial sectors and large middle classes and which would be immune to the ups and downs of the global economy. Despite the potential threats to United States commercial interests, the newly inaugurated Roosevelt administration (1933–1945) understood that the United States could not wholly oppose import substitution. Roosevelt implemented the Good Neighbor policy and did not block the nationalization of some American companies in Latin America. Mexican President Lázaro Cárdenas nationalized American oil companies, out of which he created Pemex.

=== Brazil ===
In Brazil, the largest country, a liberal revolution of 1930 overthrew the oligarchic coffee plantation owners and brought to power an urban middle class that had business interests that promoted industrialization and modernization. Aggressive promotion of new industry turned around the economy by 1933, and encouraged American investors' support. Brazil's leaders in the 1920s and 1930s decided that Argentina's implicit foreign policy goal was to isolate Portuguese-speaking Brazil from Spanish-speaking neighbors, thus facilitating the expansion of Argentine economic and political influence in South America. Even worse, was the fear that a more powerful Argentine Army would launch a surprise attack on the weaker Brazilian Army. To counter this threat, Brazil forged closer links with the United States. Meanwhile, Argentina moved in the opposite direction. During World War II, Brazil was a staunch ally of the United States and sent its military to Europe. The United States provided over $100 million in Lend-Lease grants, in return for free rent on air bases used to transport American soldiers and supplies across the Atlantic, and naval bases for anti-submarine operations. In sharp contrast, Argentina was officially neutral and at times favored Germany.

=== Border disputes and warfare ===
Small-scale border disputes were common, but only one spiralled out of control, leading to a major war: the Chaco War in 1932–1935. Two small countries, Bolivia (with 2.2 million people) and Paraguay (with only 900,000) fought grueling battles over control of the Gran Chaco, a large but long-neglected border region where oil had recently been discovered. Bolivia was rich in oil, but needed a port on the rivers controlled by Paraguay to export it. Bolivia used authoritarian methods to raise a large, well-equipped army. However, its soldiers were accustomed to high altitudes and became sickly in the low-lying, disease infested Chaco jungles. Paraguay, employing émigré Russian officers, had much better planning and logistics, and was generally more successful militarily. About 28,000 soldiers and all were killed, but a precise breakdown of whose soldiers they were is unknown. Paraguay was awarded about three fourths of the disputed territory in a peace treaty brokered by Argentina and four other South American nations. Frustrated Bolivian veterans formed a political party, staged a coup and ruled for three years until they in turn were overthrown by the next coup

== Asia and Africa ==
=== Egypt ===
In December 1921, demonstrations again led to violence. In deference to the growing nationalism and at the suggestion of the High Commissioner, Lord Allenby, the UK unilaterally declared Egyptian independence on 28 February 1922. Britain, however, continued in control of what was renamed the Kingdom of Egypt. Britain guided the king and retained control of the Canal Zone, Sudan and Egypt's external and military affairs. King Fuad died in 1936 and King Farouk inherited the throne at the age of sixteen. Alarmed by the Second Italo-Abyssinian War when Italy invaded Ethiopia, he signed the Anglo-Egyptian Treaty, requiring Britain to withdraw all troops from Egypt by 1949, except at the Suez Canal. During World War II, British troops used Egypt as its primary base for all Allied operations throughout the region. British troops were withdrawn to the Suez Canal area in 1947, but nationalist, anti-British feelings continued to grow after the war.

=== Japan ===
In Japan, the Army increasingly took control of the government, assassinated opposing leaders, suppressed the left, and promoted a highly aggressive foreign policy with respect to China. Japanese policy angered the United States, Britain, France, and the Netherlands. Japanese nationalism was the primary inspiration, coupled with a disdain for democracy. The extreme right became influential throughout the Japanese government and society, notably within the Kwantung Army, which was stationed in Manchuria along the Japanese-owned South Manchuria Railroad. During the Mukden incident of 1931, radical army officers conquered Manchuria from local officials and set up the puppet government of Manchukuo there without permission from the Japanese government. International criticism of Japan following the invasion led to Japan withdrawing from the League of Nations.

The Greater East Asia Co-Prosperity Sphere in 1942, after conquest of the colonies of the US, Britain, and the Netherlands.

Japan's expansionist vision grew increasingly bold. Many of Japan's political elite aspired to have Japan acquire new territory for resource extraction and settlement of surplus population. These ambitions led to the outbreak of the Second Sino-Japanese War in 1937. After their victory in the Chinese capital, the Japanese military committed the infamous Nanjing Massacre. The Japanese military failed to destroy the Chinese government led by Chiang Kai-shek, which retreated to remote areas. The conflict was a stalemate that lasted until 1945. Japan's war aim was to establish the Greater East Asia Co-Prosperity Sphere, a vast pan-Asian union under Japanese domination. Hirohito's role in Japan's foreign wars remains a subject of controversy, with various historians portraying him as either a powerless figurehead or an enabler and supporter of Japanese militarism. The United States grew increasingly worried about the Philippines, an American colony, within easy range of Japan and started looking for ways to contain Japanese expansion.

American public and elite opinion—including even the isolationists—strongly opposed Japan's invasion of China in 1937. President Roosevelt imposed increasingly stringent economic sanctions intended to deprive Japan of the oil and steel it needed to continue its war in China. Japan reacted by forging an alliance with Germany and Italy in 1940, known as the Tripartite Pact, which worsened its relations with the US. In July 1941, the United States, Great Britain, and the Netherlands froze all Japanese assets and cut off oil shipments—Japan had little oil of its own.

=== China ===
The 1911 Revolution that overthrew the last Emperor resulted in a decade of chaotic conditions, with power held by regional warlords with no functioning national government. A series of economic boycotts, aimed especially at the dominant intruder Great Britain, effectively ended European domination of China. Sun Yat-sen, the ideological leader of the revolution against the old Chinese Empire, established a revolutionary base in south China, and tried but failed to unite the fragmented nation. With assistance from the Communist International based in the USSR, he entered into an alliance with the fledgling Chinese Communist Party. After Sun's death in 1925, his protégé, Chiang Kai-shek was in control of the Kuomintang (Nationalist Party or KMT) and brought most of south and central China under its rule the Northern Expedition military campaign of 1926–1927. Having defeated the warlords in south and central China by military force, Chiang was able to secure the nominal allegiance of the warlords in the North. In 1927, Chiang turned on the communists and relentlessly chased the CPC armies and its leaders from their bases in southern and eastern China. In 1934, driven from their mountain bases such as the Chinese Soviet Republic, the CPC forces embarked on the Long March across China's most desolate terrain to the northwest, where the survivors established a guerrilla base at Yan'an in Shaanxi Province. During the Long March, the communists reorganized under a new leader, Mao Zedong (Mao Tse-tung), who looked to the peasants—not the small industrial proletariat—for his party's base.

Japan's army in China was a virtually autonomous unit that was not well controlled by Tokyo. It sought to control all of Manchuria and indeed was ambitious toward moving deep into China. It seized Manchuria in September 1931 and set up Puyi as head of the puppet state of Manchukuo in 1932. The League of Nations denounced Japan, and Tokyo quit the League. The United States and Britain refused to recognize the conquest, but made no military moves at this point. The Japanese began to push from south of the Great Wall into northern China and the coastal provinces. In 1937, the Imperial Japanese Army, still largely independent of Tokyo, clashed with Chinese forces in the Marco Polo Bridge Incident outside Beijing.

A full-scale war now began—the Second Sino-Japanese War. Japan held enormous advantages in wealth, technology, firepower, mobility and organizational strength. China had a very large, poor, population with a weak nation government and a large, poorly equipped and poorly trained army. China did enjoy the sympathy of most of the world, especially the United States and Britain, but they did not intervene. Shanghai fell after a three-month battle and Japan took control virtually all the coastal cities. The capital of Nanjing fell in December 1937. It was followed by an orgy of mass murders and rapes known as the Nanjing Massacre. Chiang moved his national capital to remote Chongqing. Japan set up a second puppet government, the Wang Jingwei regime, based in Nanjing. The United States took the lead in expressing outrage, and began plans to systematically aid Chiang's regime by a long supply line through Indochina while demanding that Japan withdraw. Japan took control of Indochina from France in 1941, cutting the main supply line, and escalating the conflict toward a war with the United States and Britain.

=== India ===
India participated in the negotiations that led to the Treaty of Versailles that formally ended the World War I. Although the delegation represented the colonial government of British India rather than an independent state, India was allowed to sign the treaty as a separate entity. The Indian delegation included representatives of the colonial administration as well as prominent Indian figures such as Ganga Singh and Satyendra Prasanna Sinha. By signing the treaty independently of the United Kingdom, India became an original member of the League of Nations in 1920. This arrangement gave British India a formal presence in international diplomacy, although its foreign policy remained largely directed by London. Participation in Imperial Conferences India also took part in several sessions of the Imperial Conference, periodic meetings that brought together leaders of the British Empire to discuss political and economic cooperation. Indian representation at these conferences was usually composed of officials appointed by the colonial government rather than elected representatives. Participation in these conferences allowed India to raise issues affecting the Indian diaspora and imperial trade. However, the constitutional status of India differed from that of the self-governing dominions such as Canada, Australia, and New Zealand, which possessed greater autonomy in external affairs.

==== Diplomatic disputes with South Africa ====
One of the most persistent diplomatic issues involving India in the treatment of people of Indian origin in the Union of South Africa. Large Indian communities had been established in South Africa during the nineteenth century, particularly in the province of Natal. Discriminatory legislation imposed by the South African government led to protests from Indian leaders and diplomatic pressure from the Government of India. Negotiations between the two governments resulted in the Cape Town Agreement, which sought to address the legal status and rights of Indians living in South Africa. The agreement also led to the establishment of diplomatic representation through Agents-General between the two territories. However, tensions continued throughout the interwar period as the South African government introduced further racial restrictions. These disputes became a recurring issue in imperial diplomacy and were frequently discussed in the Imperial Conference and in the League of Nations. Membership in the League of Nations As a signatory of the Versailles settlement, British India was admitted as an original member of the League of Nations in 1920. India participated in the League Assembly and served on various technical committees dealing with issues such as labor standards, health, and international communications.

== Coming of World War II ==
=== Wars ===
- Turkish War of Independence
  - Greco-Turkish War (May 1919 – October 1922)
  - Turkish–Armenian War (September–December 1920)
  - Franco-Turkish War (December 1918 – October 1921)
  - Royalist and separatist revolts (1919–1923)
- Unification of Saudi Arabia
  - Rashidi-Saudi War (1903–1921)
  - Kuwait-Saudi War (1919–1920)
  - Hejaz-Saudi War (1919–1925)
  - Transjordan-Saudi War (1922–1924)
- Polish–Soviet War (February 1919 – March 1921)
- Irish War of Independence (January 1919 – July 1921)
- Iraqi Revolt (1920)
- Rif War (1920–1927)
- Pacification of Libya (1923–1932)

== See also ==
- International relations (1648–1814)
- International relations (1814–1919)
- Aftermath of World War I
- Appeasement
- Causes of World War II
- Communist International (The "Comintern")
- European foreign policy of the Chamberlain ministry
- Germany–Soviet Union relations before 1941
- Soviet Union–United States relations
- Interwar period
- Interwar Britain
- Jazz Age
- Minority Treaties
- Political history of the world

=== Timelines ===
- Timeline of the 2nd millennium
- Timeline of the Great Depression
- Timeline of the 20th century, since 1900
- Timeline of events preceding World War II
  - Events preceding World War II in Europe
  - Events preceding World War II in Asia
- Diplomatic history of World War I
- Diplomatic history of World War II
