= France–Spain relations =

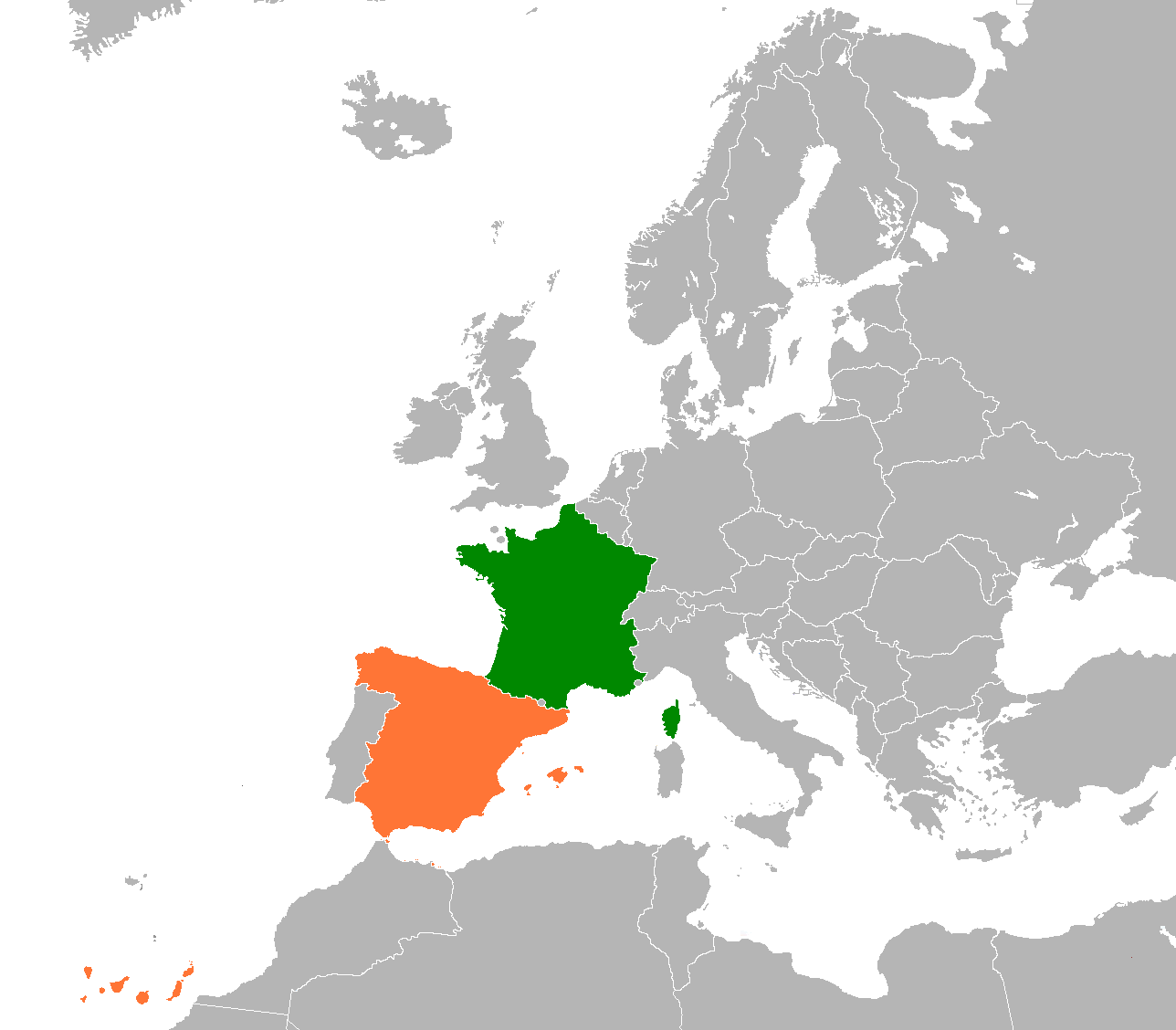
- France: Spain

Diplomatic mission
- Embassy of France, Madrid: Embassy of Spain, Paris

Envoy
- Ambassador Kareen Rispal: Ambassador Victorio Redondo Baldrich

France and Spain maintain bilateral relations, in which both share a long border across the Pyrenees, other than one point which is cut off by Andorra. As two of the most powerful kingdoms of the early modern era, France and Spain fought a 24-year war (the Franco-Spanish War) until the signing of the Treaty of the Pyrenees in 1659. The treaty was signed on Pheasant Island between the two nations, which has since been a condominium, changing its allegiances each six months. Louisiana was under French and Spanish control.

Both nations are member states of the European Union (and both nations utilize the euro as currency); both are also members of the Council of Europe, OECD, NATO, Union for the Mediterranean, and the United Nations as well as the former colonial legacies of Cuba as a Spanish colony and Saint-Domingue (Haiti) as a French colony.

== History ==
=== Antiquity ===
Trade networks predated the Roman conquest, with Phoenician and Greek foundations in southern Hispania and southern Gaul from the 8th century BC.

The entire mainlands of both Gaul and Hispania were possessions of the Roman Empire during Antiquity. Under Roman rule, exchange intensified to secure stable supply chains for luxury goods and essential resources, binding Hispania and Gaul into an integrated economic system.

Maritime routes constituted the principal axis of exchange, with important trading hubs such as Massalia and Empúries. Overland transport relied on major roads like the Via Augusta and Via Domitia. From the 2nd century BC onward, increasing incorporation into the Roman economy led to the specialization of regional industries in accordance with wider roman demand.

The Roman trading network facilitated the circulation of high-value commodities: Hispania notably exported wine, olive oil, and garum, while Gaul supplied Terra sigillata, textiles, and agricultural produce. Iron also formed a significant component of trade, moving in raw and semi-finished forms between Gallic production centers into nearby provices, including Hispania.

=== Medieval ===
While the term "Spain" may be improper when used to refer to France–Spain relations before the union of the Crown of Castile and the Crown of Aragon in 1476, there has always been important relations between what are now France and Spain.

One important feature of those early relations was that counts from the Marca Hispanica and Navarre fought shoulder to shoulder with Frankish Kings (during the Carolingian dynasty), against the Al Andalus Muslim kingdom. Barcelona was a County of the Frankish Empire, under protection of the Frankish King/Emperor.

This vassalty of Marca Hispanica and Navarre to the Frankish empire remained effective up to 985. At that point, because his armies were mobilized in the Verdum's county, Lothair of France and his Byzantine allies did not assist Navarre and Marca Hispanica in its defense against the Caliph, implying that they failed to defend Barcelona from the Arabs. Almanzor did not stay in the cities (the first assault was launched 6 July 985; withdrew their troops 23 July), but this incursion was arguably the first step of a process of independence of the county of Barcelona from the kingdom of France, and heralded what would become the Aragon kingdom. While independent of France and integrated in the Crown of Aragon, Barcelona remained legally a county of France and the King of France retained a de jure right to vote in the Barcelone Courts in the next centuries. This situation generated numerous territorial conflicts between the two kingdoms to control what is now the south of France and the north of Spain (the support of Aragon to the Count of Toulouse, death in Perpignan of Philip III of France married to Isabel of Aragon, and Albigenses Crusades are some of the most famous examples) and played a significant political role in the start of the Catalan Revolt which ended with the treaty of Pyrenees.

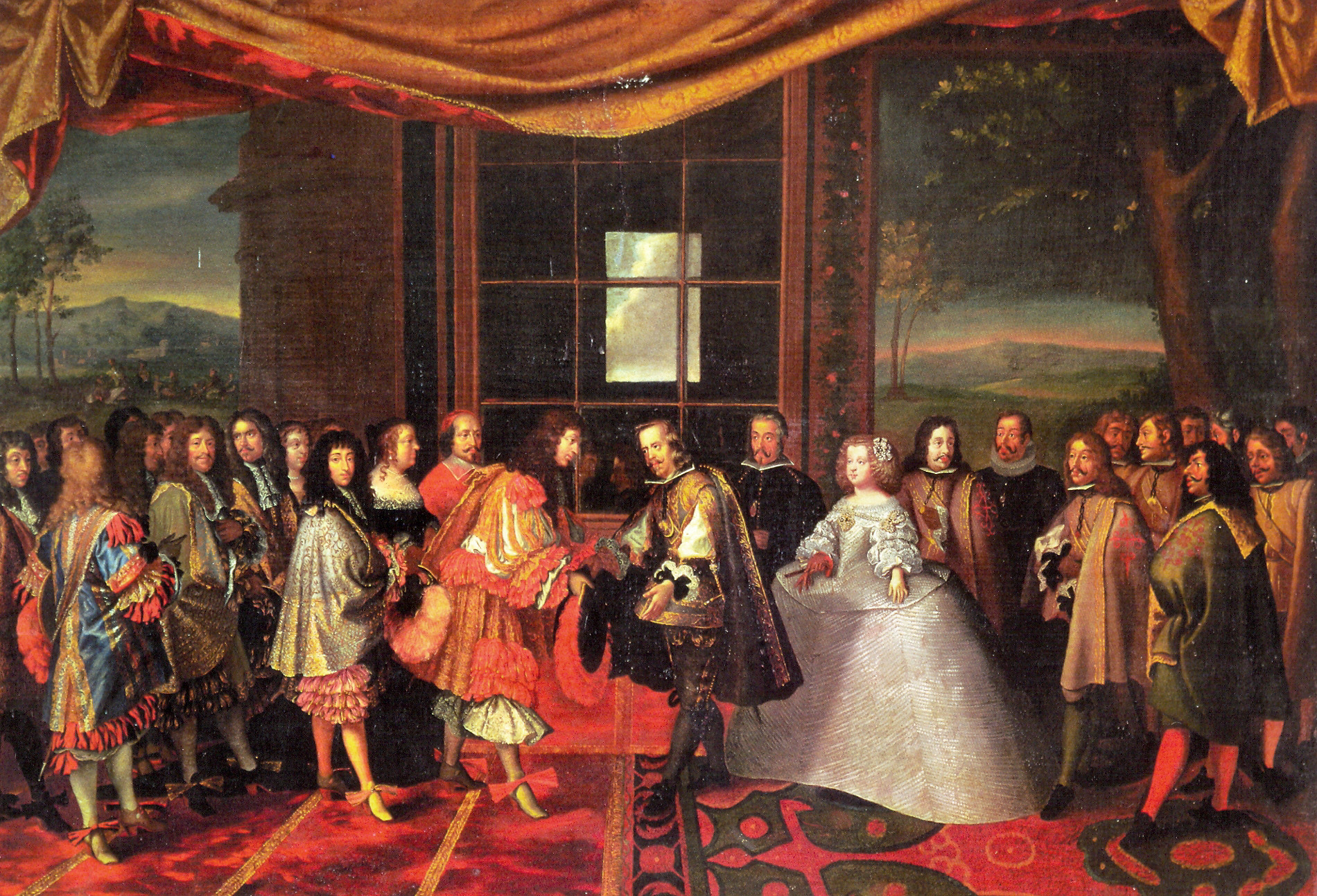
Louis XIV of France and Philip IV of Spain signing the Treaty of the Pyrenees in 1659, ending the 24-year Franco-Spanish War.

=== 17th century ===
The Franco-Spanish War broke out in 1635, when French king Louis XIII felt threatened that his entire kingdom was bordered by Habsburg territories, including Spain. In the Caribbean island of Martinica, Spain had ceded to France on 15 September 1635. In 1659, the Treaty of the Pyrenees ended the war and ceded the Spanish-possessed Catalan county of Roussillon to France, which had supported the Principality of Catalonia in a revolt against the Spanish crown. Western Flanders, roughly equivalent to the modern French department of Nord, was also ceded. An anomaly of the treaty was that although all villages in Roussillon were ceded to France, Llívia was deemed to be a city and was therefore retained by Spain to the present day as an exclave 3 kilometres (2 mi) into France. The treaty was signed on Pheasant Island, an uninhabited, unserviced island in the Bidasoa river between the French commune of Hendaye and the Spanish municipality of Irun. Both settlements, and therefore their countries, took sovereignty of the island for six months out of each year. After Philip IV of Spain defeat, Marie-Thérèse of Austria, Infant of Spain, was married to the king of France Louis XIV. In 1697, The Spanish ceded the western part of Hispaniola to France of what will become known as French Saint-Domingue (later known as Haiti).

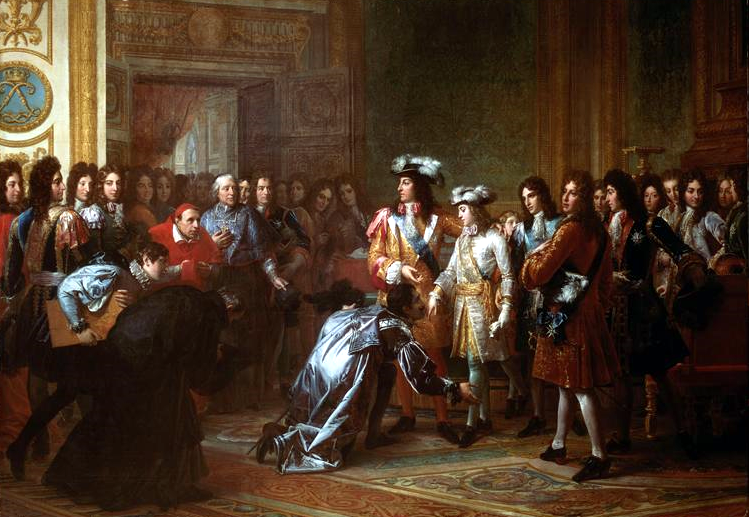
Philip of Anjou is proclaimed Philip V of Spain on 16 November 1700 at Versailles.

=== 18th century ===
In 1701, after the death of the last Habsburg king of Spain, Charles II, the French House of Bourbon, led by Louis XIV, staked a claim to the Spanish throne. The war ended with the Bourbon Philip V being recognised as King of Spain. The House of Bourbon remains on the Spanish throne to the present day.

Francisco Goya painting, The Third of May 1808 (1814), depicting French soldiers executing civilians defending Madrid.

The wars were very expensive; despite Mexican silver Spain declines economically.

=== 19th century ===
Revolutionary France and Bourbon Spain signed the Treaty of San Ildefonso in 1796 as part of their shared opposition to Britain. In 1804, after the Haitian Revolution had ended, France was almost defeated and driven out of the colony by Toussaint Louverture's successors Jean-Jacques Dessalines and Henri Christophe which declared Haiti independent and become the world's first and oldest black republic in human history and the second independent nation in the Western Hemisphere after the United States. The relationship spoiled after defeat in 1805 at the Battle of Trafalgar, and in 1808, French Emperor Napoleon invaded Spain and named his brother Joseph as King of Spain as part of a plan to get closer to invading Britain's ally, Portugal. The British under the Duke of Wellington drove the French out of Spain in 1813 following the Battle of Vitoria.

The Bourbon king Ferdinand VII was imprisoned by Napoleon, but still remained recognized as Spanish monarch by Napoleon's adversaries. He returned to the throne in 1813 after the defeat of the French in the Peninsular War.

In 1820, a military uprising in Spain lead to a liberal government, the Trienio Liberal, to come to power. Two years later, Ferdinand VII lobbied the monarchs of Europe to help him restore his power, to which France responded by sending 60,000 troops which overthrew the liberal government and re-installed Ferdinand as the absolute monarch.

=== 20th century ===
==== Aftermath of the Spanish Civil War and the outbreak of World War II, 1939–1945 ====
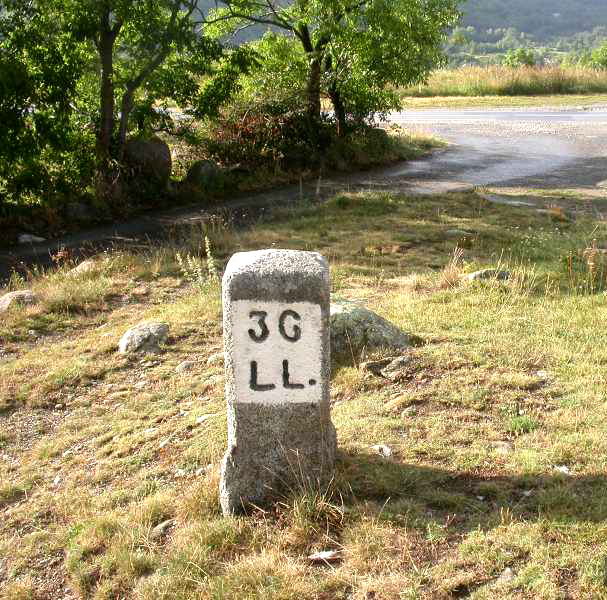
Border stone between France and the Spanish city of Llívia. After a stalled deal to allow the defeated Republican Army control the city, France permitted Spain to control it.

When the Nationalist forces of General Francisco Franco were victorious at the end of the Spanish Civil War in 1939, there was discussion of Llívia, a small exclaved Spanish city 3 km (2 mi) into France, becoming territory of the defeated Republican Army. No conclusion was reached and the French authorities allowed the Nationalists to occupy Llívia.

France had tentatively supported the Spanish Republicans during the civil war, and had to readjust its foreign policy towards Spain in the fact of the Nationalists' imminent victory. On 25 February 1939, France and Francoist Spain signed the Bérard-Jordana Agreement, in which France recognized the Franco government as the legitimate government of Spain and agreed to return Spanish property of various types (including, among others. weapons and munitions, gold reserves, art and livestock) previously in the possession of the Republicans to the Nationalists. In return, the new Spanish government agreed to good neighborly relations, colonial cooperation in Morocco, and made informal assurances to repatriate the more than 400,000 refugees that had fled from the Nationalists' Catalonia Offensive into France in early 1939. Philippe Pétain, later the leader of the Vichy regime during the German occupation of France, became the French ambassador to the new Spanish government. Spain would later undermine the spirit of the Bérard-Jordana Agreement when the Spanish entry into the Anti-Comintern Pact and subsequent alignment with the German and Italian fascists resulted in a military buildup in colonial Morocco, in spite of the promise of cooperative policy in that area. Spain was however unwilling to be drawn into World War II, and had announced its intentions to remain neutral in German expansionist designs to France as early as the 1938 Sudeten crisis. This scepticism towards Spanish involvement on German behalf was further strengthened when the Spanish government got news of German cooperation with the Soviet Union, formerly a supporter of the Spanish Republicans during the civil war, under the 1939 Molotov–Ribbentrop Pact. Although Spain remained neutral, Spanish volunteers were allowed to fight on the side of the Axis powers as part of the German "Blue" 250th Infantry Division.

With the restoration of the French government in the latter part of the Second World War, relations between Spain and France became more complex. Exiled Spanish Communists had infiltrated northern Spain from France via the Val d'Aran but were repelled by Franco's army and police forces. The border between the two countries was temporarily closed by the French in June 1945.

==== Between World War and Cold War, 1945–1949 ====
The border between France and Spain was closed indefinitely on 1 March 1946, following the execution of the Communist guerrilla Cristino García in Spain. The Franco government criticized the action, commenting that many refugees from France had used the same border to escape to safety in Spain during the war. Several days after the border closing, France issued a diplomatic note with the United States and Britain calling for the formation of a new provisional government in Madrid. Additionally, Spain's formerly close relationship with Italy and Nazi Germany led to suspicion and accusations. Some Nazis and French collaborators fled to Francoist Spain following the end of the war, most notably Pierre Laval, who was turned over to the Allies in July 1945. One French report claimed that 100,000 Nazis and collaborators were sheltered in Spain. The Soviet Union declared there were 200,000 Nazis in the country and that Franco was manufacturing nuclear weapons and intended to invade France in 1946.

==== The Franco regime during the Cold War, 1949–1975 ====
With the advent of the Cold War, relations gradually improved. The Pyrenean border was re-opened again in February 1948. Several months later France (along with Britain) signed a commercial agreement with the Franco government. Relations further improved in 1950 when the French government, concerned about international subversion, forced the Spanish Communist Party to leave France.

Franco-Spanish relations would become more tense with the rise to power of Charles de Gaulle, especially when the rebel French general Raoul Salan found sanctuary among Falangists in Spain for six months in 1960–61. Nevertheless, some commercial relations were done, the French finance minister visited Madrid in April 1963 to conclude a new commercial treaty.

==== Post-Francoist Spain, 1975–2000 ====
When Spain was led by general Francisco Franco, the French believed that ETA attacks were aimed at overthrowing the government of Franco, and did not feel targeted by ETA. The reason for this was the help that regime of Franco gave to the terrorist organization OAS and because of that when ETA started to kill people de Gaulle gave them shelter in the French Basque Country, the so-called Le Sanctuaire. However, when the attacks continued after the death of Franco, France started a collaboration with the Spanish government against ETA.

In recent years, due to an improving economy in Spain, the balance between France and Spain has shifted somewhat. The balance has also changed because of the democratization of Spain since the death of Franco in 1975. France, Spain, and the United Kingdom were the main European Union (EU) member countries that classified the ETA organization as a terrorist group. In addition, this group was also associated with the IRA terrorist group.

=== 21st century ===
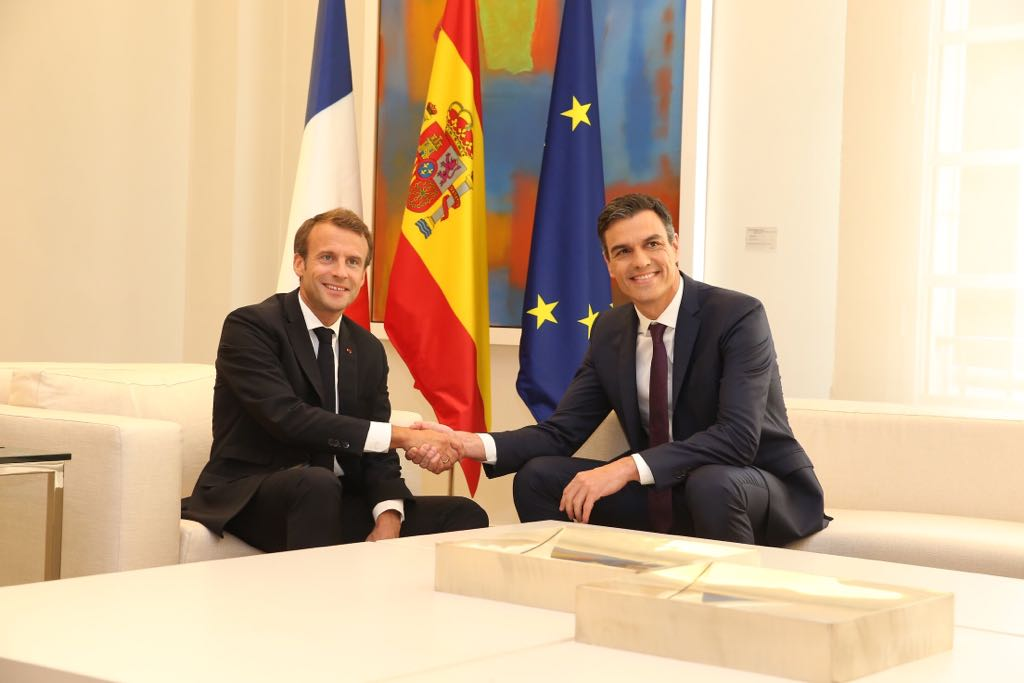
Spanish Prime Minister Pedro Sánchez and French President Emmanuel Macron meeting at the Moncloa Palace in Madrid; on 26 July 2018.

France is one of the largest trading partners of Spain. In March 2015, Philip VI of Spain chose to go to France as its first diplomatic visit since his accession. The visit was widely regarded as a way to hail the excellent bilateral relations between France and Spain.

Since May 2022, both countries finalize their first Friendship Treaty. In this way, Spain would be the third country with which France reaches such a status in its diplomatic relations, after Germany (1963, renewed 2019) and Italy (2021). As a consequence of the Russian invasion of Ukraine, new proposals for the transport of natural gas through Europe were reconsidered. In this sense, France, Portugal and Spain would discuss the distribution of costs and the deadlines for new energy projects, which would bring green hydrogen from the Iberian Peninsula to the rest of the continent.

On 19 January 2023, Spanish Prime Minister Pedro Sánchez and French President Emmanuel Macron signed a Treaty of Friendship between both countries.

Macron is set to made a state visit to Spain (the third since 1905) in September 2026.

== Cultural exchange ==
During the Roaring' 20s, France was the scene of major art exhibitions attended by famous Spanish artists, such as Joan Miró, Joaquín Sorolla, Pablo Picasso or Salvador Dalí.

The Spanish Civil War and hardship immediately after spurred Spanish migration to the more developed and democratic France, which had a labour shortage in the aftermath of the Second World War. The Spanish artist Pablo Picasso, resident in the French capital Paris since 1901, was refused naturalisation shortly after Franco took control of Spain, but remained in Paris until his death in 1973.

A Eurostat publication in 2016, estimated that 122,385 French citizens live in Spain and 128,000 Spanish citizens live in France, while it is also estimated that 144,039 people in France were born in Spain. Currently, it is estimated that there are more than 125,000 French residents in Spain and more than 275,000 Spanish residents in France. Furthermore, after English, French is the second most studied foreign language in Spain, while Spanish is the second most studied foreign language in France.

With a dual nationality agreement, French and Spaniards can acquire nationality without giving up their nationality. France is the first country outside the Ibero-American sphere with which Spain signed an agreement of this nature.

== Resident diplomatic missions ==
of France in Spain

- Madrid (Embassy)
- Barcelona (Consulate-General)
- Bilbao (Consulate-General)
- Seville (Consulate-General)

of Spain in France

- Paris (Embassy)
- Bayonne (Consulate-General)
- Bordeaux (Consulate-General)
- Lyon (Consulate-General)
- Montpellier (Consulate-General)
- Marseille (Consulate-General)
- Pau (Consulate-General)
- Perpignan (Consulate-General)
- Strasbourg (Consulate-General)
- Toulouse (Consulate-General)

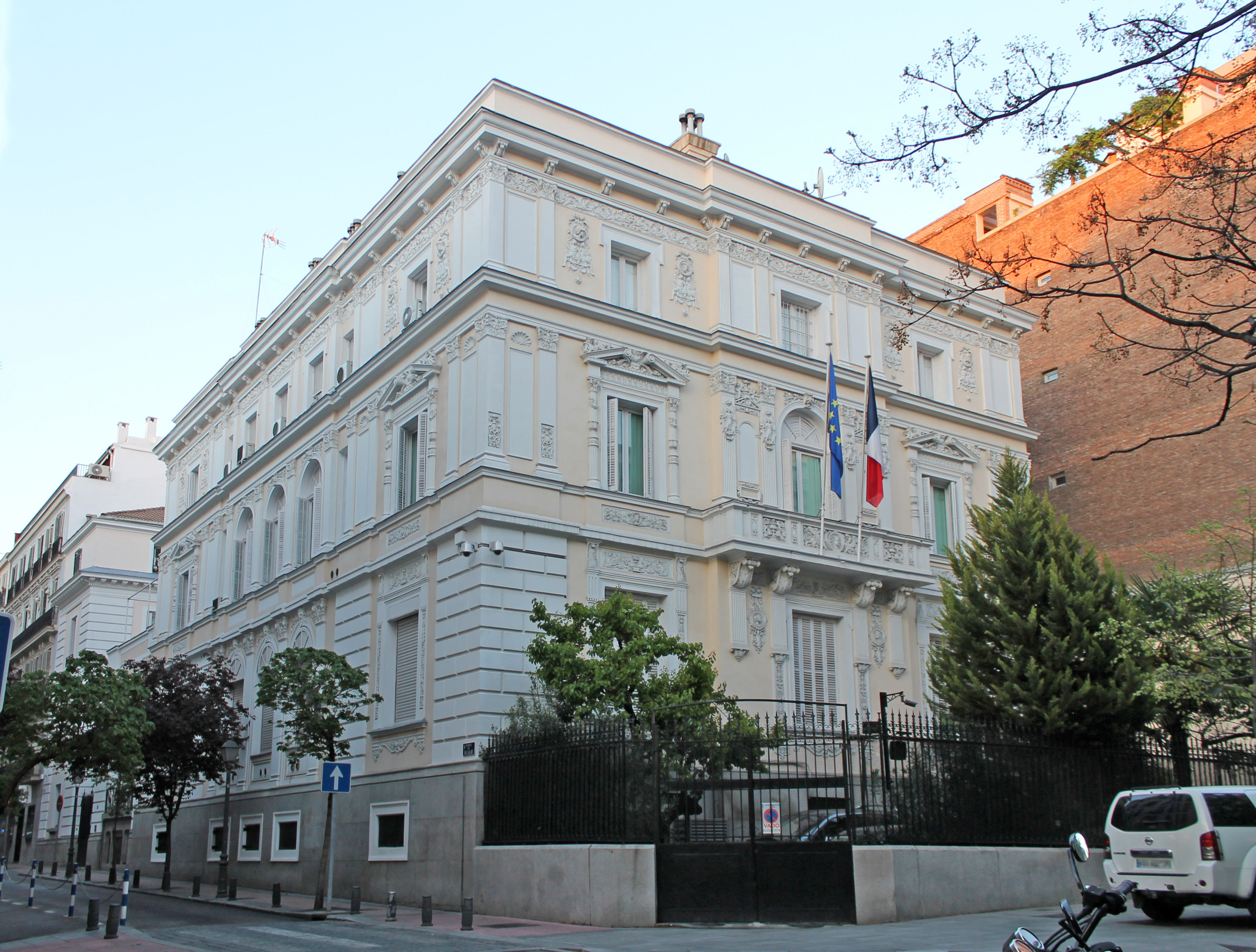
Embassy of France in Madrid

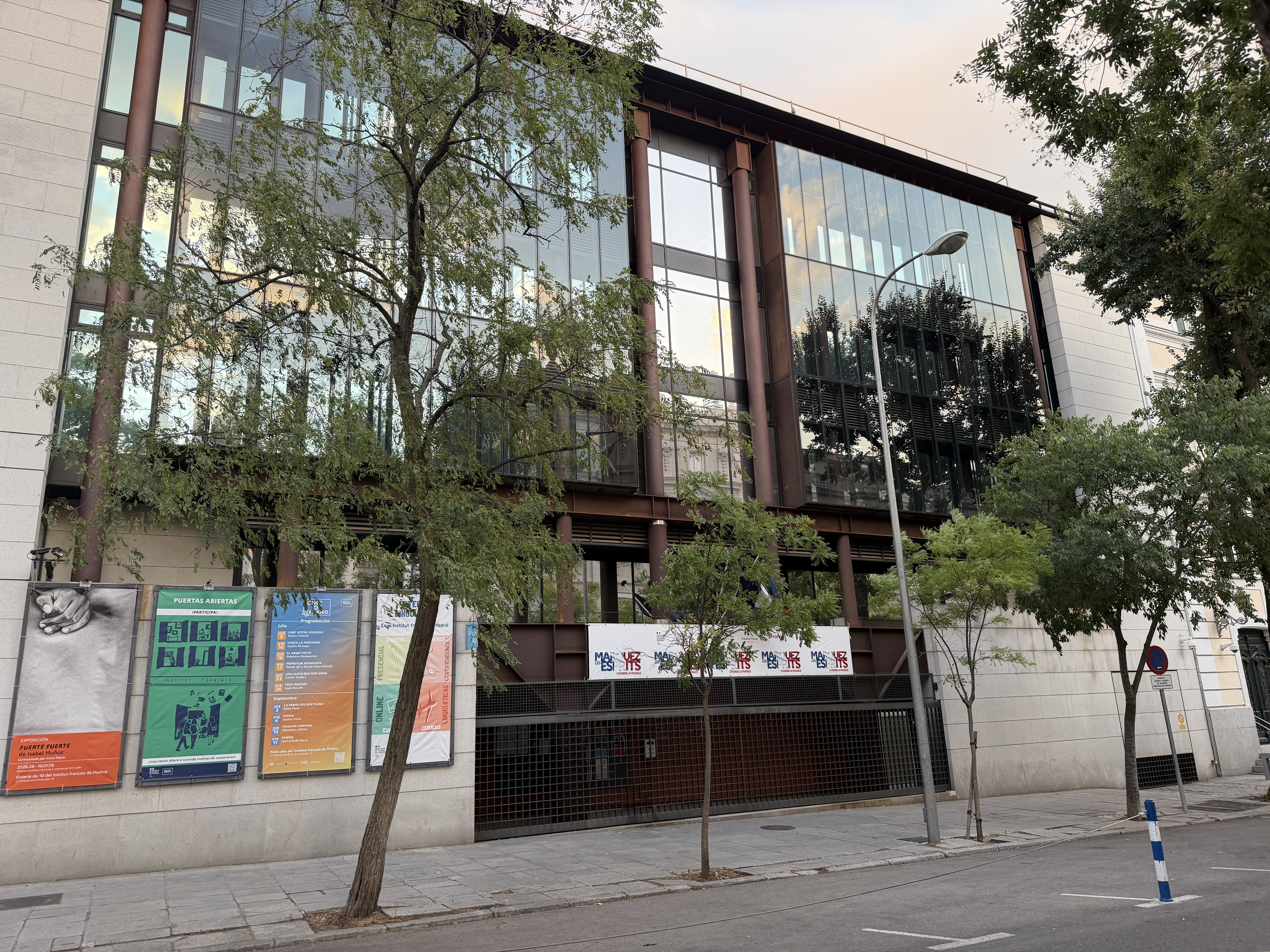
Consulate-General of France in Madrid

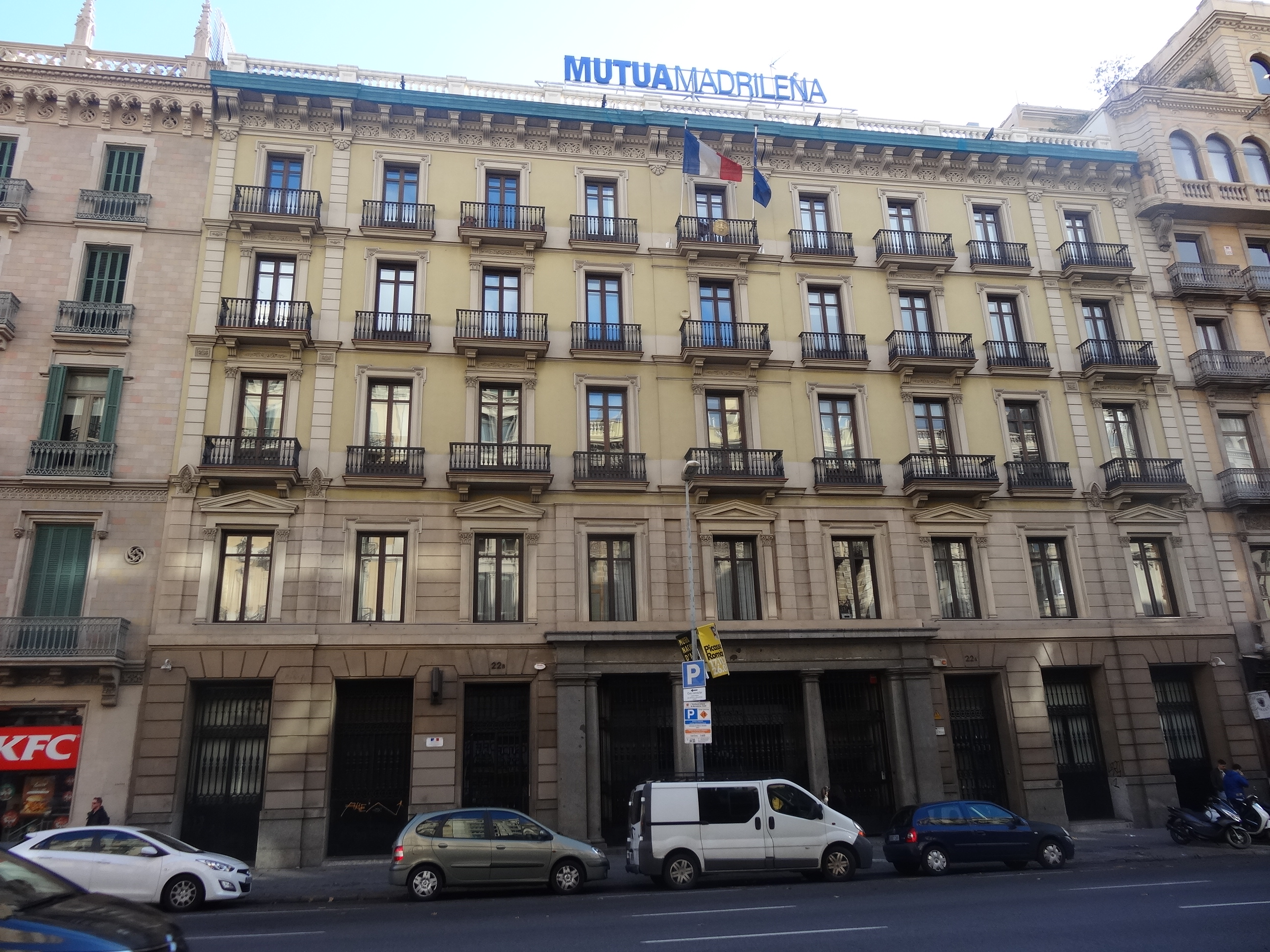
Consulate-General of France in Barcelona
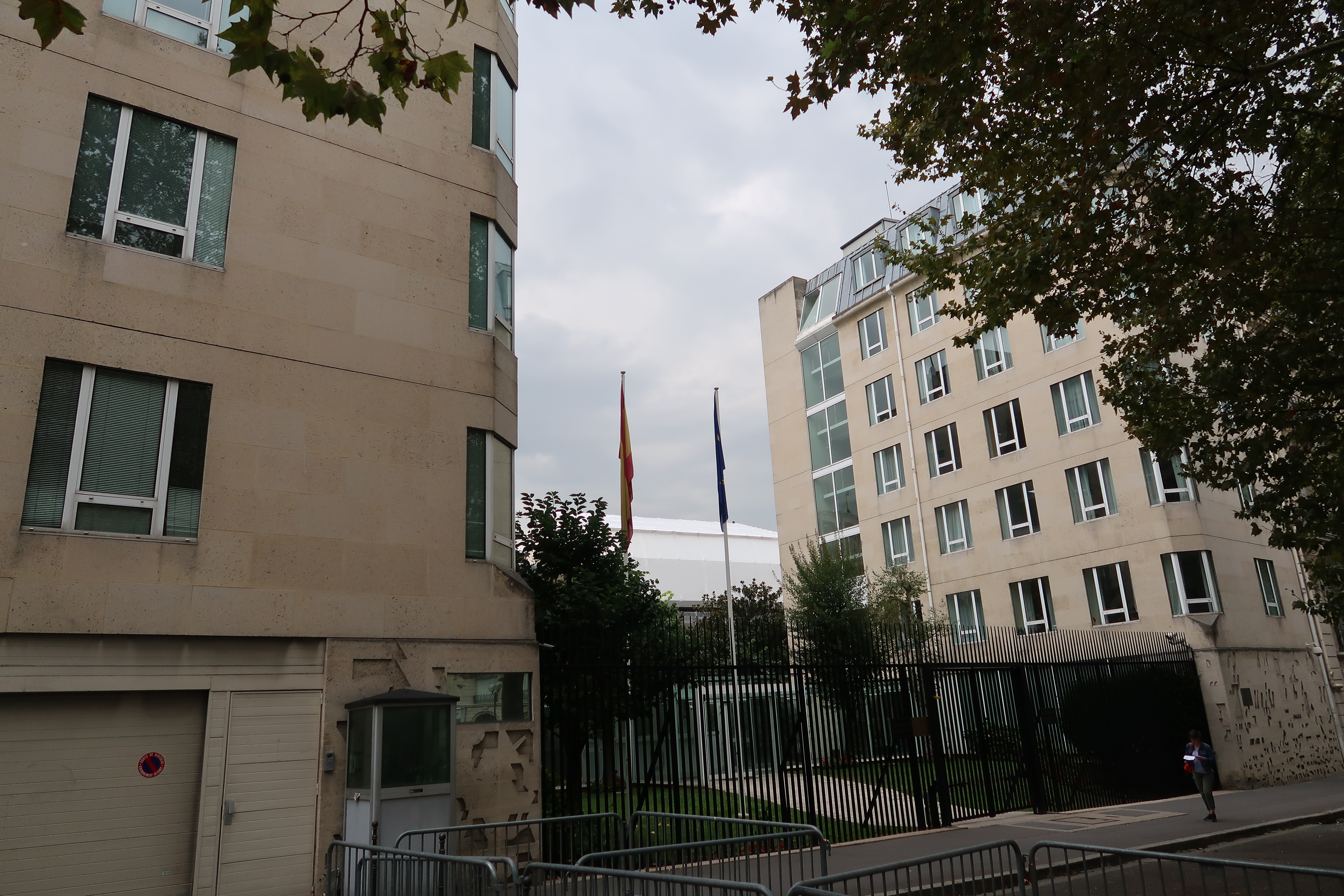
Embassy of Spain in Paris

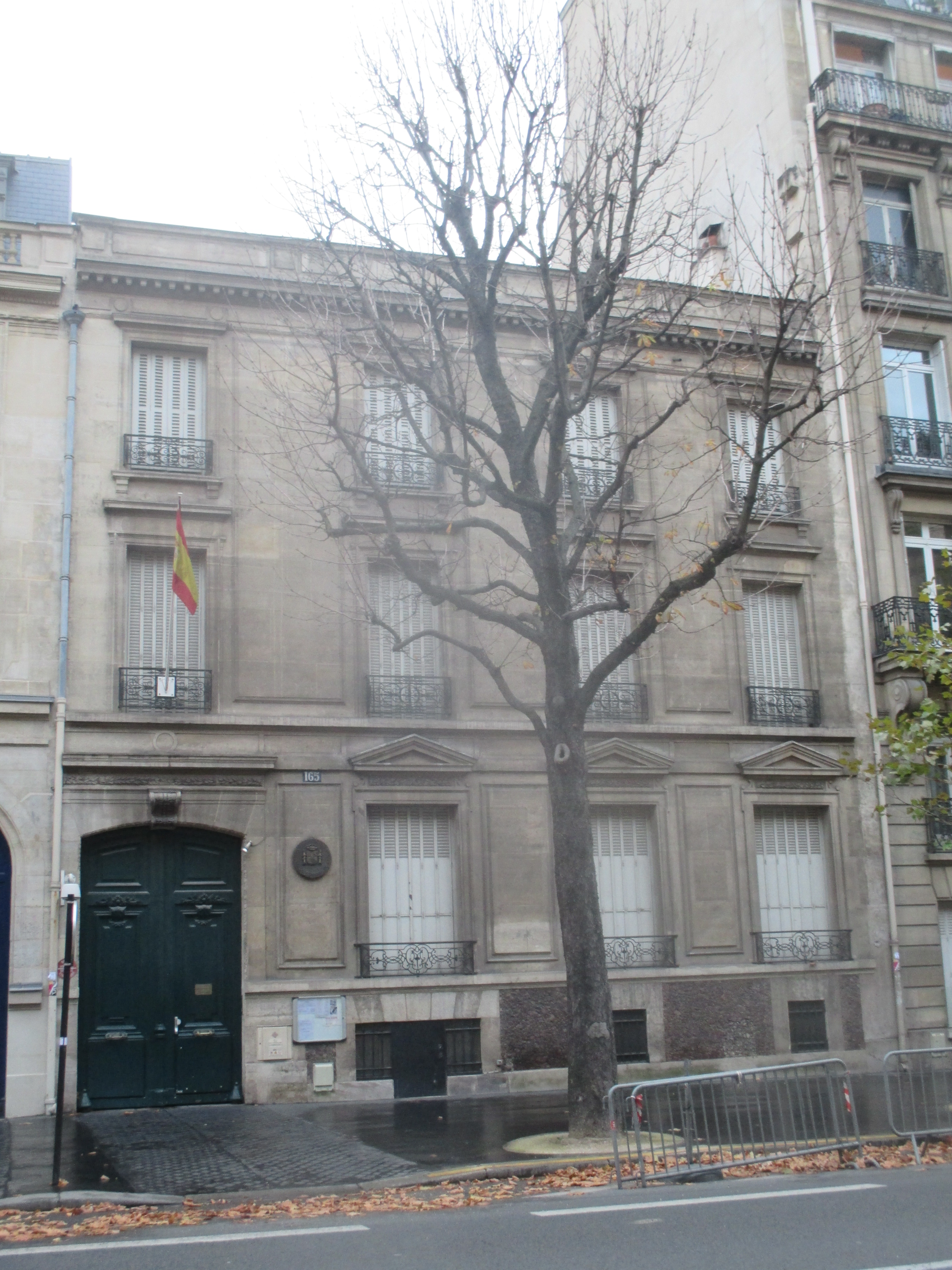
Consulate-General of Spain in Paris

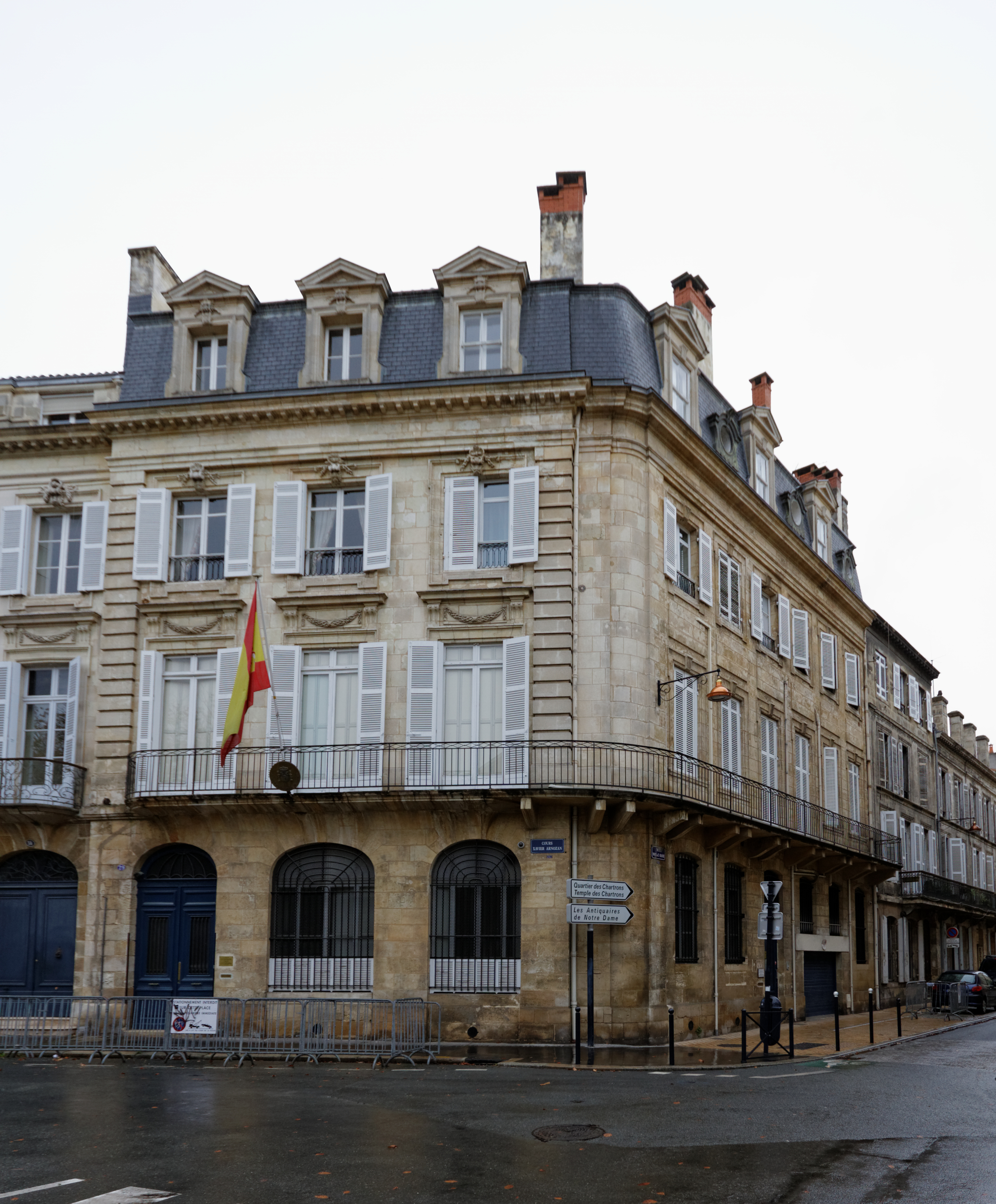
Consulate-General of Spain in Bordeaux

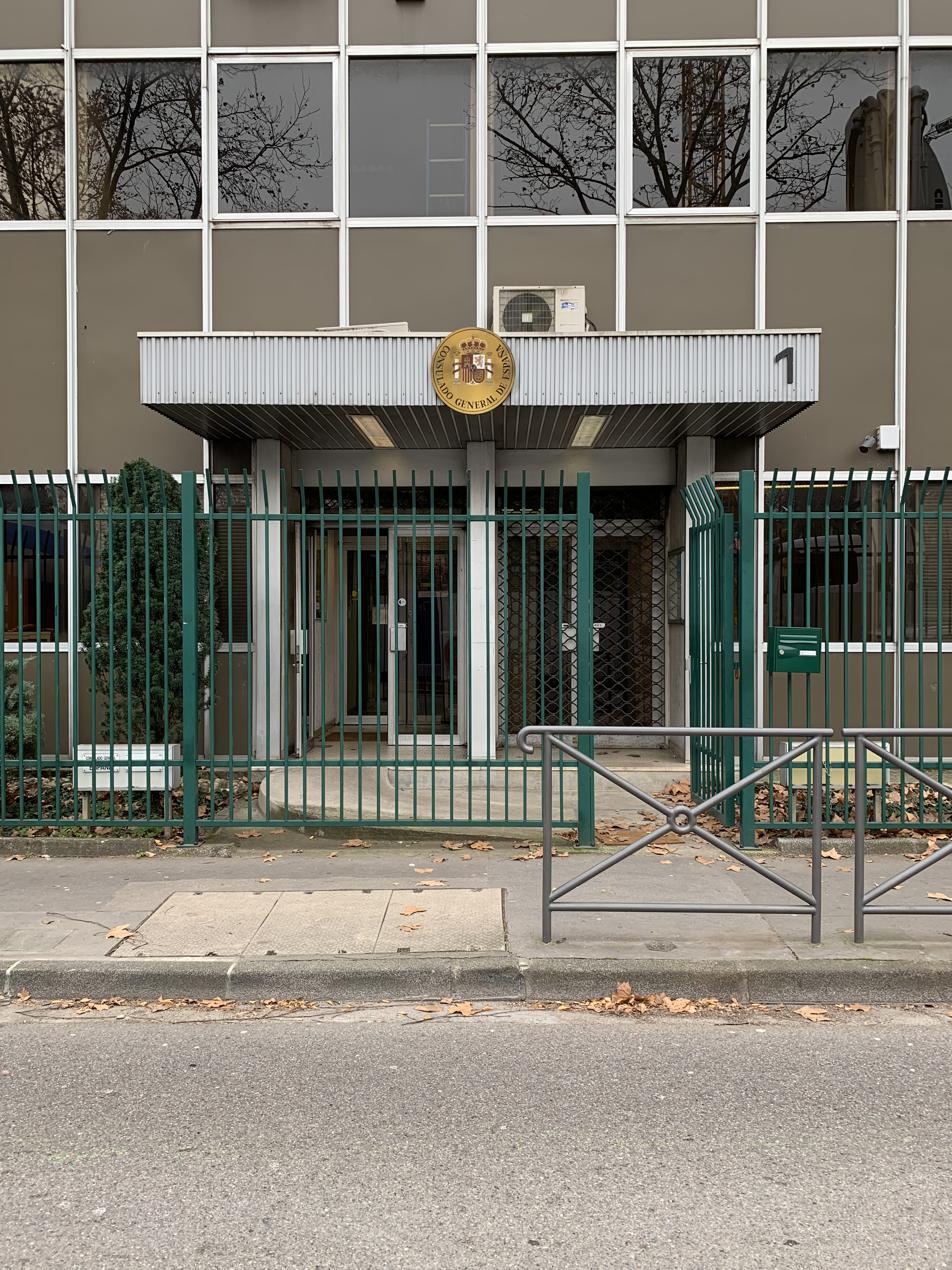
Consulate-General of Spain in Lyon

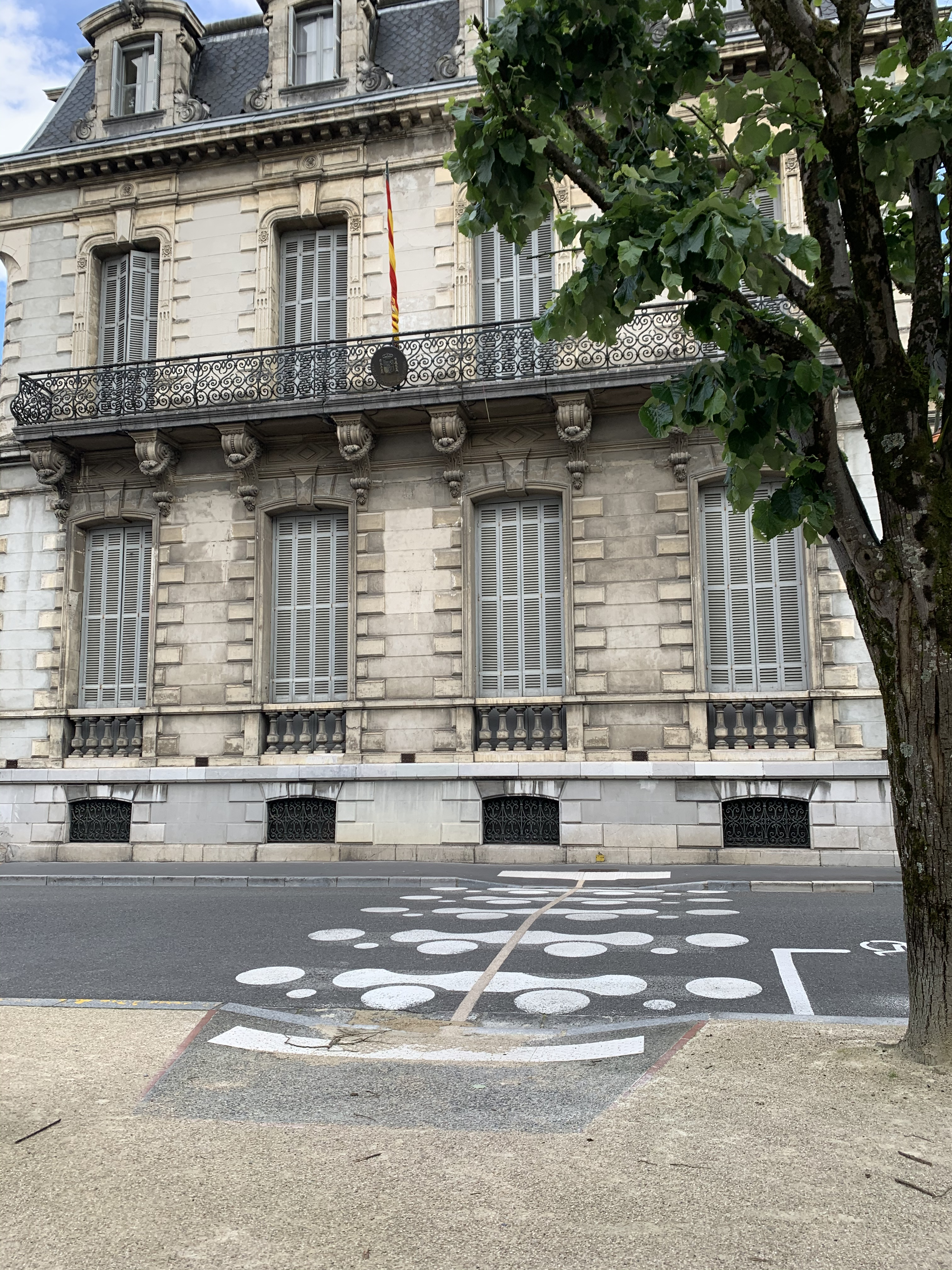
Consulate-General of Spain in Pau

== Summits ==
- 23rd French–Spanish Summit; 27 November 2013 in Madrid.
- 24th French–Spanish Summit; 1 December 2014 in Paris.
- 25th French–Spanish Summit; 20 February 2017 in Málaga.
- 26th French–Spanish Summit; 15 March 2021 in Montauban: Spain and France signed an agreement on dual citizenship.

== See also ==
- Foreign relations of France
- Foreign relations of Spain
- France–Spain border
- List of ambassadors of France to Spain
- List of ambassadors of Spain to France
