= Léon Bérard =

French politician and lawyer

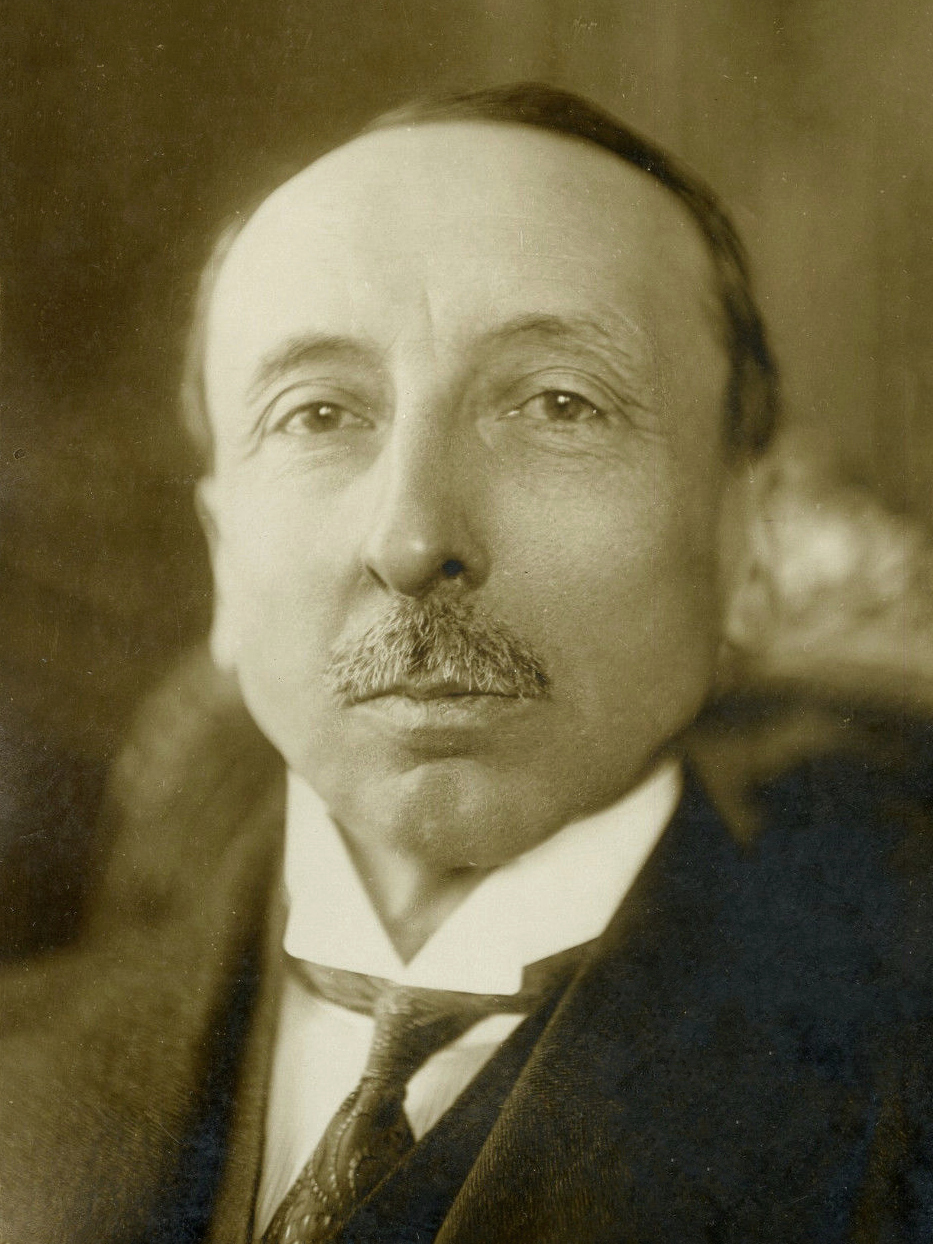
Léon Bérard

Léon Bérard (French pronunciation: [leɔ̃ beʁaʁ]; 6 January 1876, Sauveterre-de-Béarn – 24 February 1960 in Saint-Étienne) was a French politician and lawyer.

Bérard was Minister of Public Instruction in 1919 and from 1921 to 1924, and Minister of Justice from 1931 to 1932. He was elected to the Académie française in 1934. He was the Ambassador from Vichy France to the Holy See from 1940 to 1945.

During his time as Senator, he was called upon by Édouard Daladier in early February 1939 to travel to Burgos, then under control of the Spanish Nationalists during the Spanish Civil War, which was drawing to its conclusion and Nationalist victory, to secure a treaty with Francoist Spain. France had previously provided tentative support to the Spanish Republicans, but was now forced to make deals with the soon to be victorious Nationalist government on the question of refugees from the Catalonia region. More than 400,000 refugees had flooded into south-eastern France since the beginning of 1939. The resulting treaty, the Bérard-Jordana Agreement, was signed on 25 February 1939 and signalled French recognition of the Francoist government in Spain. Soon after, the governments of the United Kingdom (27 February) and the United States (7 April) also recognized Franco's government as legitimate. Philippe Pétain became French ambassador to Spain and oversaw the implementation of the treaty. He was awarded Order of the White Eagle.

== Opposition to Esperanto ==
Bérard was strongly opposed to Esperanto, which he considered an instrument of Internationalism and a potential rival of French as a diplomatic language. As Minister of Public Instruction, he banned the teaching or the promotion of Esperanto in public schools, and he had a prominent role in the rejection by the League of Nations of a resolution in favor of the adoption of Esperanto as an auxiliary international language.

Political offices
Preceded by Georges Pernot	Minister of Justice; 1931–1932	Succeeded by Marc Rucard
