= Bérard-Jordana Agreement =

1939 treaty between France and Spain

- Drafted: 5–23 February 1939
- Signed: 25 February 1939
- Location: Burgos, Francoist Spain
- Effective: 27 February 1939
- Signatories: Léon Bérard; Francisco Gómez-Jordana Sousa
- Parties: France; Spain

The Bérard-Jordana Agreement (French: Accords Bérard-Jordana, Spanish: Acuerdo Bérard-Jordana), also called Berard-Jordan Agreement in English, was a political treaty signed by France and Spain in Burgos on 25 February 1939. Its name is based on the two principal signatories, Léon Bérard for France and General Francisco Gómez-Jordana Sousa for Spain.

== Background ==
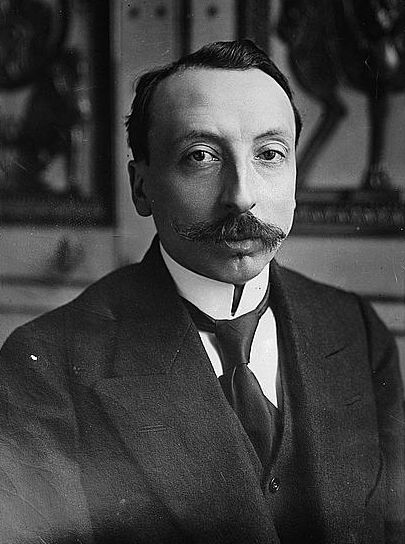
Léon Bérard

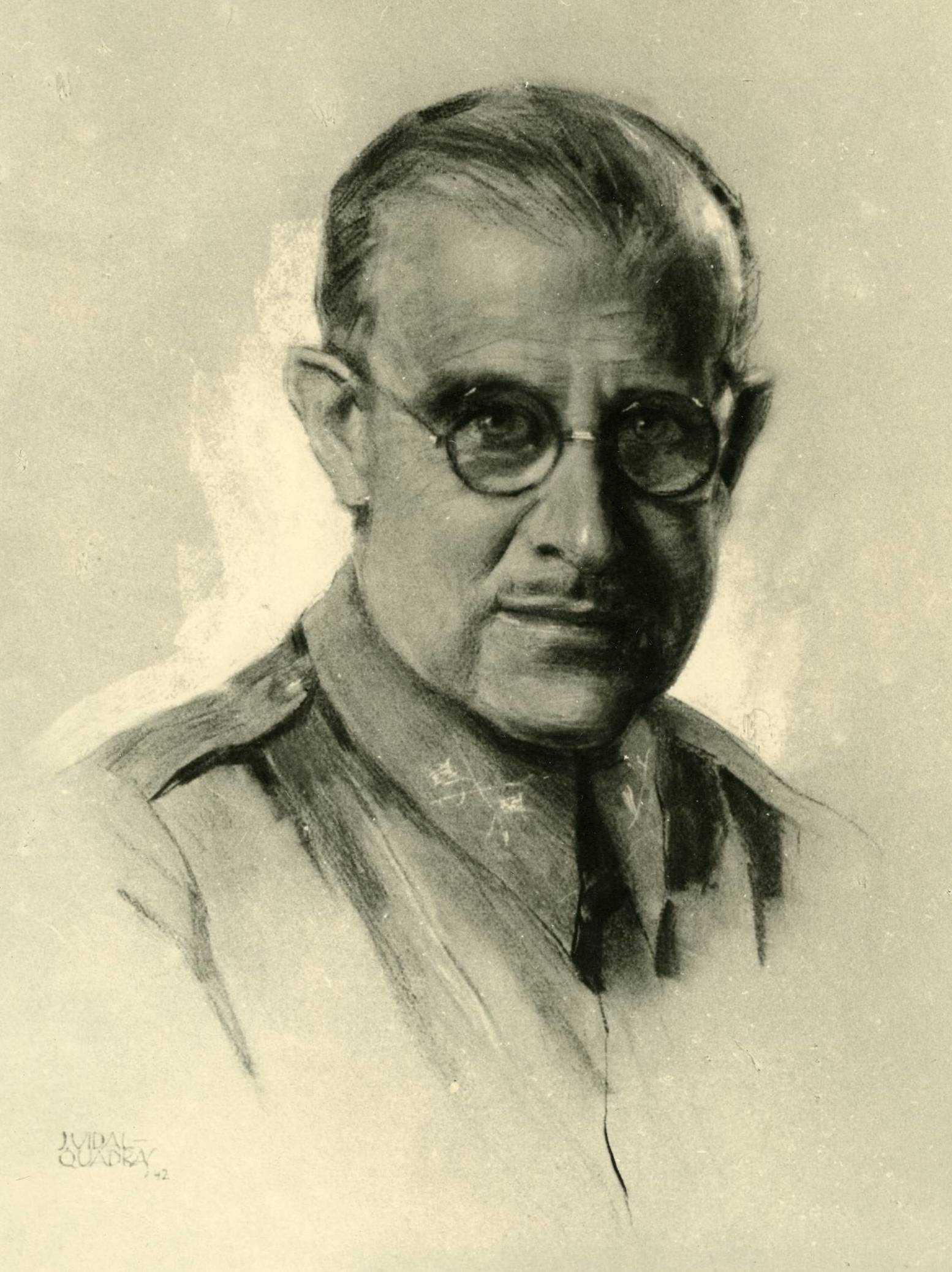
Francisco Gómez-Jordana Sousa

The Spanish Civil War had begun between the left-leaning Republicans (or "Loyalists") and the right-leaning Nationalists on 17 July 1936, but by January 1939, it had decisively turned to favour the Nationalists, with major Republican defeats at the Battle of the Ebro in November 1938 and the Catalonia Offensive of 1938–1939 causing the fall of Barcelona. In the meantime, Nazi Germany advanced its foreign policy goals on France's other flank by achieving the Remilitarization of the Rhineland and the Anti-Comintern Pact in 1936 and the Anschluss of Austria and the Munich Agreement in 1938.

The Spanish Nationalists, who accepted German and Fascist Italian assistance against the Republicans, did not want to be drawn into a potential conflict between Germany and France and signalled to unofficial French envoys to the Nationalist leadership that they would maintain strict neutrality in Germany's expansionist designs.

The left-leaning French government of Léon Blum, which had tentatively supported the Republicans, was now faced with more than 400,000 refugees, who attempted to escape the Nationalist advance and crossed the border into France, as well as with the diplomatic prospect of Spain being ruled by Francisco Franco, who was diplomatically aligned with France's rivals: Germany and Italy. As a result, the French government was forced to clarify its relationship with Francoist Spain to deal with the refugee crisis and to prevent a Spanish military alliance with Germany and Italy that might be aimed against France. The new Francoist government in Spain, on the other hand, wanted to maximise its own political and diplomatic legitimacy by normalising the relations with France and the United Kingdom as soon as possible. The Spanish leadership was willing to grant the French request to prevent permanent German and Italian troop presence in Spain, which the Francoists had not intended to allow anyway. However, Spain in return demanded for France to deliver all goods of the Spanish Republic that were currently in France, including art collections, financial assets and military equipment.

Meetings took place between the French Senator Léon Bérard and General Francisco Gómez-Jordana Sousa, Franco's leading advisor on foreign policy and later foreign minister, in February 1939. The first meeting started on 5 February, the second on 18 February. The final convention at which the treaty was signed between Bérard and Jordana started on 23 February. France accepted almost all of Spain's demands for the diplomatic relationship and could not secure any major concessions from the Spanish in return.

The agreement was signed on 25 February 1939. It remained secret until the French government published it on 27 February.

The French legislature voted to confirm the recognition of Franco on 24 February and in favour of Édouard Daladier's desire to normalise relations with the new Spanish regime by a margin of 323 to 261.

== Content ==
The agreement contained a political declaration, a declaration of good neighbourly relations, and a declaration on the Spanish assets in France. Furthermore, Jordana gave verbal assurances on the refugee situation in France.

=== Political Declaration ===
The French government recognised the Franco government as legitimate in Spain. Spain and France affirmed that they would co-operate in Morocco. (Note: The promise of co-operation in Morocco was promptly undermined by a Spanish military buildup in Spanish Morocco, which came in the aftermath of the Spanish joining the Anti-Comintern Pact on 27 March 1939; see Stone 1989, p. 221.)

=== Declaration of good neighbourly relations ===
Both governments agreed to undertake every necessary measure for the close supervision of any activity directed against the tranquility and security of the other party. The French government promised to take specific measurements to prevent subversive activities of Spanish nationals in France directed against Spain.

=== Verbal assurances by General Jordana regarding the refugee question ===
The Spanish government declared its willingness to receive all refugees, without distinction between men, women and children, who had gone to France. However, the Spanish government reserved itself the right to prosecute in Spanish courts any refugees for any crimes that they might have committed.

=== Declaration on Spanish assets in France ===
The French government promised to return Spanish property of the following types:

- Gold deposited as a pledge of a loan to the Banque de France at Mont-de-Marsan.
- Weapons and war material of all kinds belonging to or intended for the Republicans.
- Livestock of all kinds entered from Spain into France against the will of the legitimate proprietors.
- All of the merchant or fishing fleet registered in Spain.
- All Spanish artistic heritage that had been exported since 18 July 1936 against the will of the legitimate owners or possessors.
- The deposits of gold, jewels, and precious stones, currency, banknotes, currency, securities, securities, stocks, bonds etc. belonging to the Spanish State and exported since July 18, 1936 against the will of their legitimate owners or owners.
- All vehicles without distinction of nature or owner registered in Spain and diverted by export in France to the detriment of their legitimate owners.

== Aftermath ==
The French and British governments recognized Franco's leadership of Spain on 27 February 1939. Philippe Pétain, who later became the leader of the collaborationist Vichy regime in France, became the French ambassador in Burgos on 2 March. He would oversee the repatriation of the Republican gold reserves and the paintings of the Museo del Prado from France to Spain. The Spanish Civil War ended on 1 April 1939 with a Nationalist victory. Franco, who was neutral in the Second World War, would remain as Spain's caudillo until his death in 1975. After the British and the French recognitions of the Franco government, the United States followed suit on 7 April 1939.

Spain continued its policy of diplomatic ambivalence between the western democracies and the European fascists and on 27 March 1939 joined the Anti-Comintern Pact, which had initially been formed by Germany and the Japanese Empire in November 1936. Spain was, however, appalled by the German co-operation with the Soviet Union under the Molotov–Ribbentrop Pact I August 1939 since the Soviets had supported the Spanish Republicans during the Spanish Civil War against Franco. Subsequently, the Spanish government was neutral in the Second World War on either side and denied the German aims for an Axis attack on Gibraltar, a British territory, under the German military's proposed Operation Felix. However, Spain allowed volunteers to fight in the German Wehrmacht as part of the 250th Infantry "Blue" Division. The entry of Spain to the Anti-Comintern Pact resulted in a Spanish buildup against the western democracies, including French Morocco, which directly went against the terms of the Bérard-Jordana Agreement. France and Spain had promised each other to maintain good neighbourly relations and to act co-operatively in both countries' Moroccan colonies in the agreement.

== See also ==
- France–Spain relations
- Spain–United Kingdom relations
- Spain–United States relations
