= Carthaginian peace =

Brutal peace imposed after war

A Carthaginian peace is the imposition of a very brutal peace intended to permanently cripple the losing side. The term is derived from the harsh peace terms imposed on the Carthaginian Empire by the Roman Republic following the Punic Wars, a series of three conflicts beginning in 264 BC and ending in 146 BC.

== Origin ==
The term was popularized by the 20th century economist John Maynard Keynes. It originates from the outcomes of the Punic Wars, where Rome progressively dismantled Carthaginian power and territory with each successive peace, and levied severe financial indemnities.

The First Punic War ended with the Treaty of Lutatius, which saw the Carthaginians cede the islands of Corsica, Sardinia, and Sicily, as well as agreeing to pay the Romans war reparations of 4,400 talents of silver. Following the Second Punic War, Carthage lost all its colonies, was forced to demilitarize, paid a constant tribute to Rome, and was barred from waging war without Rome's permission.

At the end of the Third Punic War, the Romans laid siege to Carthage. When they took the city, they killed most of the inhabitants, sold 50,000 prisoners into slavery, burned the city to the ground, and annexed its remaining territory into the Roman province of Africa. There is no ancient evidence for modern accounts that the Romans sowed the ground with salt.

== Modern use ==
Usage of the term is often extended to any peace settlement in which the peace terms are overly harsh and designed to accentuate the inferiority of the defeated belligerent.

=== Treaty of Versailles ===
After World War I, Keynes described the Treaty of Versailles as a Carthaginian peace. Keynes argued that imposing reparations on Germany beyond its economic capacity would harm the broader European economy; he also criticized statesmen such as Georges Clemenceau, whom he viewed as seeking security through ensuring an economically weak Germany.

=== Morgenthau Plan ===
The Morgenthau Plan put forward after World War II has also been described as a Carthaginian peace, as it advocated the deindustrialization of Germany. It was intended to severely curb the influence of German power in the region and to prevent its remilitarization, as had occurred after World War I (German rearmament and the Remilitarization of the Rhineland). The Morgenthau Plan was dropped in favor of the Marshall Plan (1948–1952), which entailed the rebuilding of Western European infrastructure, particularly in West Germany.

General Lucius D. Clay, a deputy to General Dwight D. Eisenhower and, in 1945, Military Governor of the U.S. Occupation Zone in Germany, would later remark that "there was no doubt that JCS 1067 contemplated the Carthaginian peace which dominated our operations in Germany during the early months of occupation. This is while the US was following the Morgenthau Plan." Clay would later replace Eisenhower as governor and as commander-in-chief in Europe. The Marshall Plan was favored as a revival of the West German economy was considered to be necessary for the recovery of the economy of Europe. West Germany was regarded as a key bulwark against the Eastern Bloc.

== See also ==
- Debellatio
- Scorched earth
- Victor's justice
- Carthago delenda est
- Pyrrhic victory

== Bibliography ==
- Antony Lentin (2025). The Treaty of Versailles and The Carthaginian Peace. Peacemaking and Mythmaking 1918-1919. Newcastle upon Tyne.296pp. ISBN 978-1-0364-1463-4.
- Luigi Loreto (1997). "L'inesistente pace cartaginese". In Mariella Cagnetta (ed.). La pace dei vinti (in Italian). Rome. pp. 79 ff. ISBN 9788870629590.
