= Treaty of Versailles =

One of the treaties that ended World War I

Treaty of Peace between the Allied and Associated Powers and Germany (Note: Preamble)
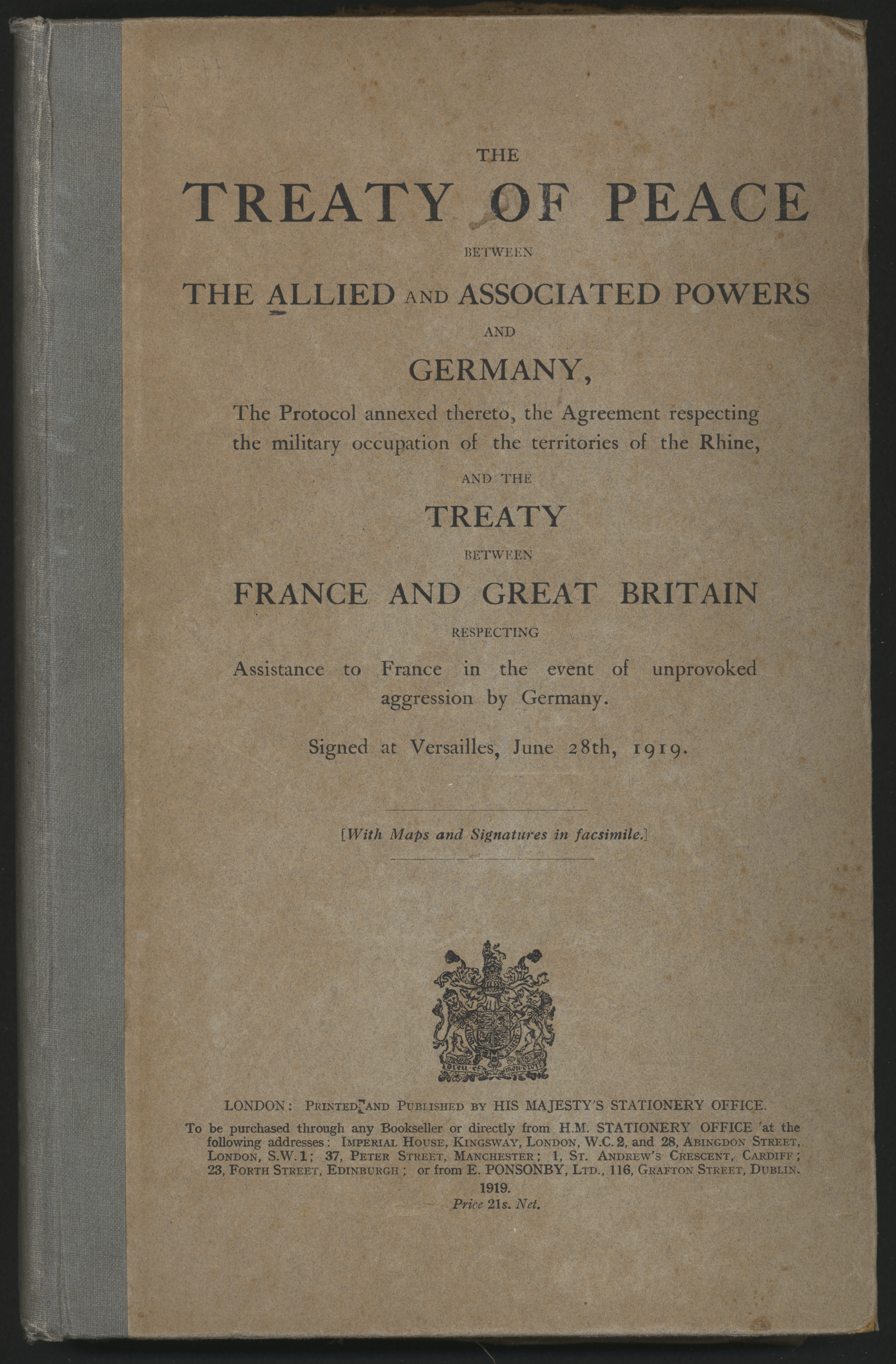
- Cover of the English version of the treaty.
- Signed: 28 June 1919; 107 years ago
- Location: Hall of Mirrors in the Palace of Versailles, Versailles, France
- Effective: 10 January 1920
- Condition: Ratification by Germany and three Principal Allied and Associate Powers (Note: Signatures and Protocol)
- Parties: Principal Allied and Associated Powers: United States (Note: The United States ended its state of war with the U.S.–German Peace Treaty (1921).); British Empire; • United Kingdom; • Canada; • Australia; • South Africa; • New Zealand; • India; France; Italy; Japan; Allied and Associated Powers: Belgium; Bolivia; Brazil; China; Cuba; Ecuador; Greece; Guatemala; Haiti; Hejaz; Honduras; Liberia; Nicaragua; Panama; Peru; Poland; Portugal; Romania; Kingdom of Serbs, Croats, and Slovenes; Siam; Czechoslovakia; Uruguay; Central Power; Germany
- Depositary: French Government
- Languages: French and English

Full text
- Treaty of Versailles at Wikisource

The Treaty of Versailles (Note: French: Traité de Versailles [tʁɛte d(ə) vɛʁsɑj]; German: Versailler Vertrag [vɛʁˈzaɪ.ɐ fɐˈtʁaːk, -ˈsaɪ.ɐ -].) was a peace treaty signed on 28 June 1919. As the most important treaty of World War I, it ended the state of war between Germany and most of the Allied Powers. It was signed in the Palace of Versailles, exactly five years after the assassination of Archduke Franz Ferdinand, the proximate cause of the war. The other Central Powers on the German side signed separate treaties. (Note: Treaty of Saint-Germain-en-Laye (1919) with Austria; Treaty of Neuilly-sur-Seine with Bulgaria; Treaty of Trianon with Hungary; Treaty of Sèvres with the Ottoman Empire (Davis 2010:49).) Although the armistice of 11 November 1918 ended the actual fighting, and agreed certain principles and conditions including the payment of reparations, it took six months of Allied negotiations at the Paris Peace Conference to conclude the peace treaty. Germany was not allowed to participate in the negotiations before signing the treaty.

The treaty required Germany to disarm, make territorial concessions, extradite alleged war criminals, agree to Kaiser Wilhelm being put on trial, recognise the independence of states whose territory had previously been part of the German Empire, and pay reparations to the Entente powers. The most critical and controversial provision in the treaty was: "The Allied and Associated Governments affirm and Germany accepts the responsibility of Germany and her allies for causing all the loss and damage to which the Allied and Associated Governments and their nationals have been subjected as a consequence of the war imposed upon them by the aggression of Germany and her allies." The other members of the Central Powers signed treaties containing similar articles. This article, Article 231, became known as the "War Guilt" clause.

Critics including John Maynard Keynes declared the treaty too harsh, styling it as a "Carthaginian peace". On the other hand, prominent Allied figures such as French Marshal Ferdinand Foch criticized the treaty for treating Germany too leniently. This remains the subject of debate by historians and economists.

The result of these competing and sometimes conflicting goals among the victors was a compromise that left no one satisfied. In particular, Germany was neither pacified nor conciliated, nor was it permanently weakened. The United States never ratified the Versailles Treaty; instead it made a separate peace treaty with Germany, albeit based on the Versailles Treaty. The problems that arose from the treaty would lead to the Locarno Treaties, which improved relations between Germany and the other European powers. The reparation system was reorganized and payments reduced in the Dawes Plan and the Young Plan. Bitter resentment of the treaty powered the rise of the Nazi Party, and eventually the outbreak of a Second World War.

Although it is often referred to as the "Versailles Conference", only the actual signing of the treaty took place at the historic palace. Most of the negotiations were in Paris, with the "Big Four" meetings taking place generally at the French Ministry of Foreign Affairs on the Quai d'Orsay.

== Background ==
=== First World War ===
Newsreel footage of the signing of the peace treaty at Versailles

War broke out following the July Crisis in 1914. Austria-Hungary declared war on Serbia, followed quickly by Germany declaring war on Russia on 1 August, and on Belgium and France on 3 August. The German invasion of Belgium on 3 August led to a declaration of war by Britain on Germany on 4 August, creating the conflict that became the First World War. Two alliances faced off, the Central Powers (led by Germany) and the Triple Entente (led by Britain, France and Russia). Other countries entered as fighting raged widely across Europe, as well as the Middle East, Africa and Asia. Having seen the overthrow of the Tsarist regime in the February Revolution and the Kerensky government in the October Revolution, the new Russian Soviet Federative Socialist Republic under Vladimir Lenin in March 1918 signed the Treaty of Brest-Litovsk, amounting to a surrender that was highly favourable to Germany. Sensing victory before the American Expeditionary Forces could be ready, Germany now shifted forces to the Western Front and tried to overwhelm the Allies. It failed. Instead, the Allies won decisively on the battlefield, overwhelmed Germany's Turkish, Austrian, and Bulgarian allies, and forced an armistice in November 1918 that resembled a surrender.

=== Role of the Fourteen Points ===
The United States entered the war against the Central Powers in 1917 and President Woodrow Wilson played a significant role in shaping the peace terms. His expressed aim was to detach the war from nationalistic disputes and ambitions. On 8 January 1918, Wilson issued the Fourteen Points. They outlined a policy of free trade, open agreements, and democracy. While the term was not used, self-determination was assumed. It called for a negotiated end to the war, international disarmament, the withdrawal of the Central Powers from occupied territories, the creation of a Polish state, the redrawing of Europe's borders along ethnic lines, and the formation of a League of Nations to guarantee the political independence and territorial integrity of all states. (Note: President Wilson's "Fourteen Points" Speech) It called for what it characterised as a just and democratic peace uncompromised by territorial annexation. The Fourteen Points were based on the research of the Inquiry, a team of about 150 advisors led by foreign-policy advisor Edward M. House, into the topics likely to arise in the expected peace conference.

=== Armistice ===
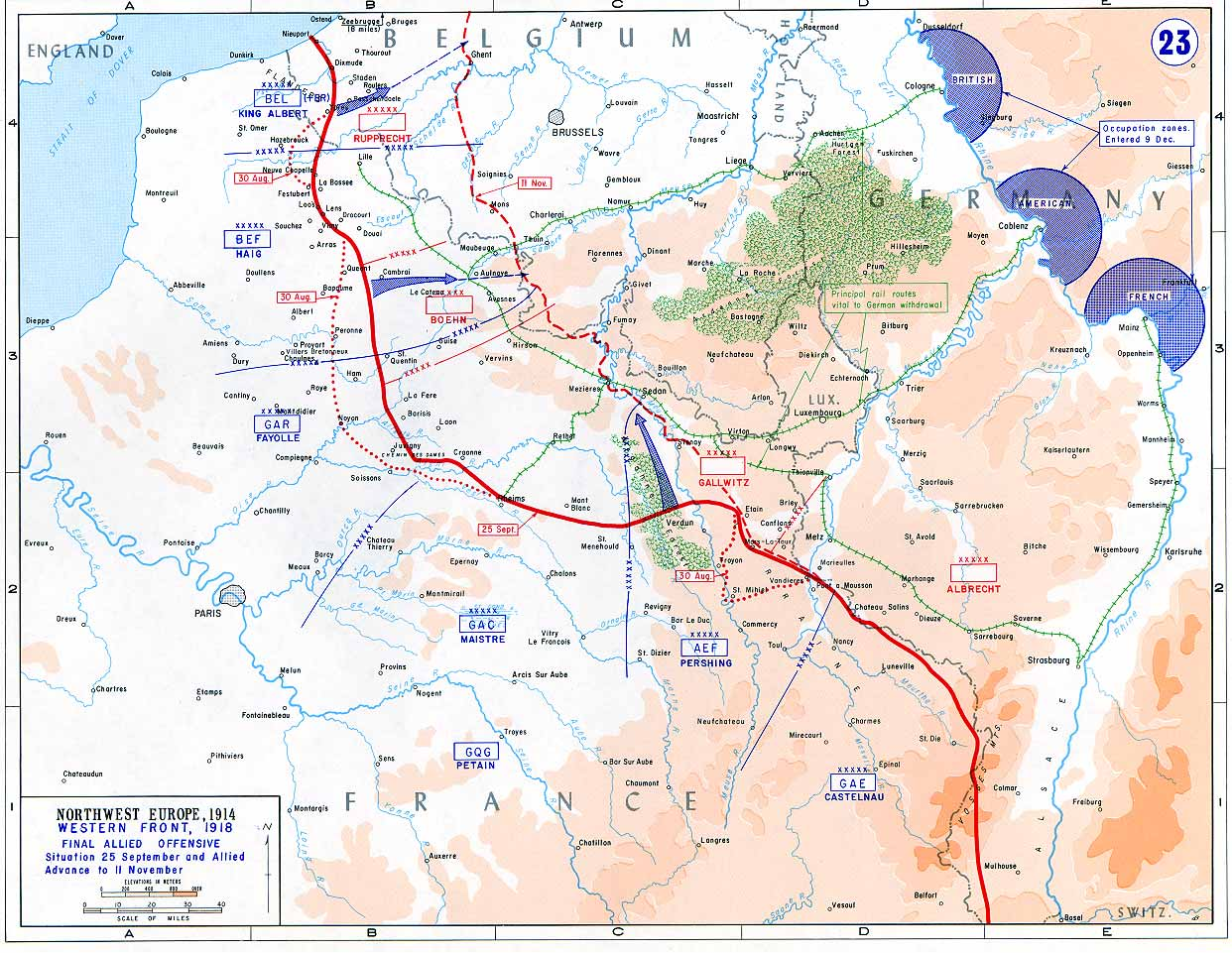
Map showing the Western Front as it stood on 11 November 1918. The German frontier of 1914 had been crossed in the vicinities of Mulhouse, Château-Salins, and Marieulles in Alsace-Lorraine. The post-war bridgeheads over the Rhine are also shown.

During the autumn of 1918, the Central Powers began to collapse. Desertion rates within the German army began to increase, and civilian strikes drastically reduced war production. On the Western Front, the Allied forces launched the Hundred Days Offensive and decisively defeated the German western armies. Sailors of the Imperial German Navy at Kiel mutinied in response to the naval order of 24 October 1918, which prompted uprisings in Germany, which became known as the German Revolution. The German government tried to obtain a peace settlement based on the Fourteen Points, and maintained it was on this basis that they surrendered. Following negotiations, the Allied powers and Germany signed an armistice, which came into effect on 11 November while German forces were still positioned in France and Belgium.

Many aspects of the Versailles treaty that were later criticised were agreed first in the 11 November armistice agreement, whilst the war was still ongoing. These included the German evacuation of German-occupied France, Belgium, Luxembourg, Alsace-Lorraine, and the left bank of the Rhine (all of which were to be administered by the Allies under the armistice agreement), the surrender of a large quantity of war materiel, and the agreed payment of "reparation for damage done".

German forces evacuated occupied France, Belgium, and Luxembourg within the fifteen days required by the armistice agreement. By late 1918, Allied troops had entered Germany and began the occupation of the Rhineland under the agreement, in the process establishing bridgeheads across the Rhine in case of renewed fighting at Cologne, Koblenz, and Mainz. Allied and German forces were additionally to be separated by a 10 km-wide demilitarised zone.

=== Blockade ===
Both Germany and Great Britain were dependent on imports of food and raw materials, most of which had to be shipped across the Atlantic Ocean. The Blockade of Germany was a naval operation conducted by the Allied Powers to stop the supply of raw materials and foodstuffs reaching the Central Powers. The German Kaiserliche Marine was mainly restricted to the German Bight and used commerce raiders and unrestricted submarine warfare for a counter-blockade. The German Board of Public Health in December 1918 stated that 763,000 German civilians had died during the Allied blockade, although an academic study in 1928 put the death toll at 424,000 people.

The blockade was maintained for eight months after the Armistice in November 1918, into the following year of 1919. Foodstuffs imports into Germany were controlled by the Allies after the Armistice with Germany until Germany signed the Treaty of Versailles in June 1919. In March 1919, Churchill informed the House of Commons, that the ongoing blockade was a success and "Germany is very near starvation." From January 1919 to March 1919, Germany refused to agree to Allied demands that Germany surrender its merchant ships to Allied ports to transport food supplies. Some Germans considered the armistice to be a temporary cessation of the war and knew, if fighting broke out again, their ships would be seized. Over the winter of 1919, the situation became desperate and Germany finally agreed to surrender its fleet in March. The Allies then allowed for the import of 270,000 tons of foodstuffs.

Both German and non-German observers have argued that these were the most devastating months of the blockade for German civilians, though disagreement persists as to the extent and who is truly at fault. According to Max Rubner 100,000 German civilians died due to the continuation blockade after the armistice. In the UK, Labour Party member and anti-war activist Robert Smillie issued a statement in June 1919 condemning continuation of the blockade, claiming 100,000 German civilians had died as a result.

== Negotiations ==
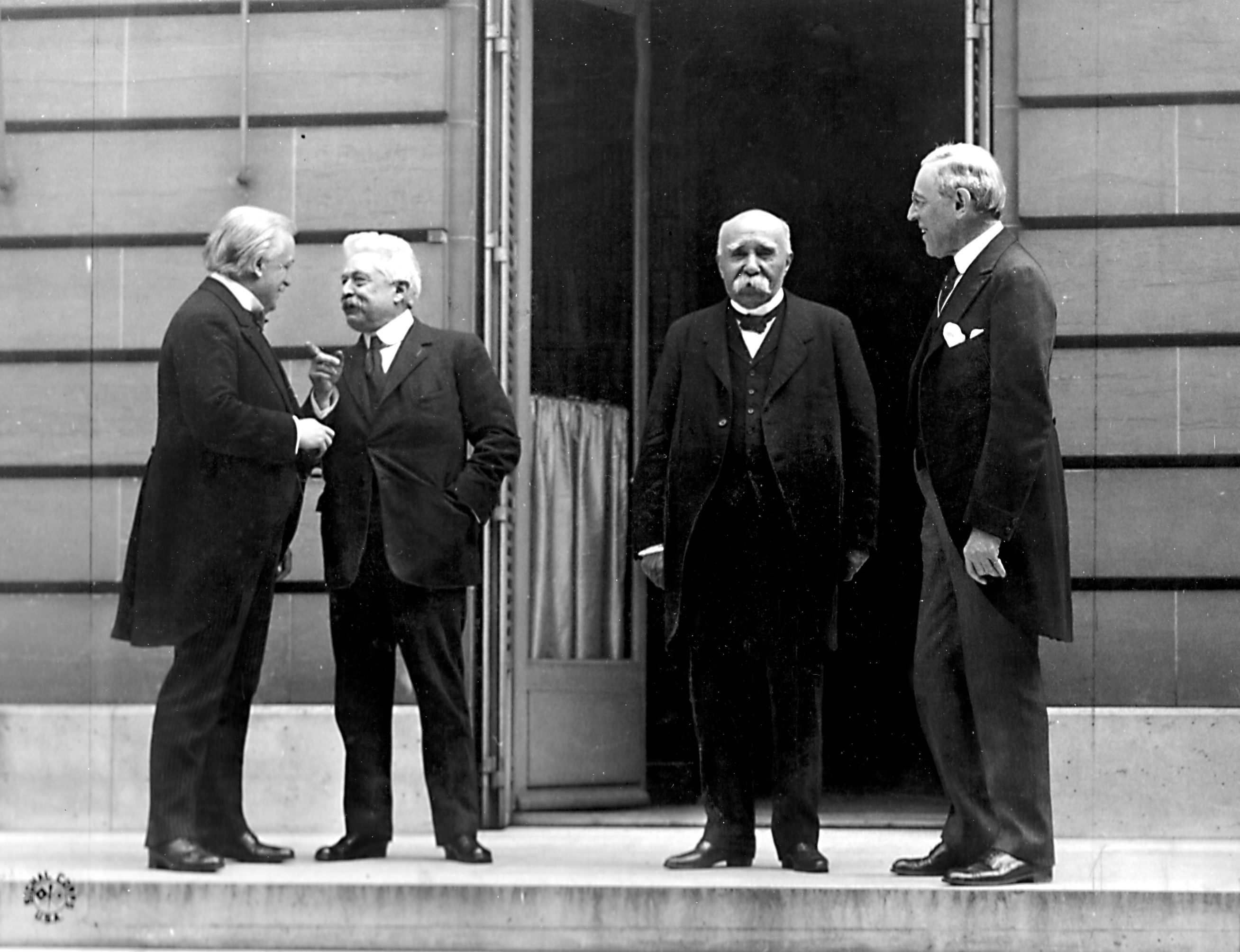
The heads of the "Big Four" nations at the Paris Peace Conference, 27 May 1919. From left to right: David Lloyd George, Vittorio Orlando, Georges Clemenceau, and Woodrow Wilson

Talks between the Allies to establish a common negotiating position started on 18 January 1919, in the Salle de l'Horloge (Clock Room) at the French Foreign Ministry on the Quai d'Orsay in Paris. Initially, 70 delegates from 27 nations participated in the negotiations. Russia was excluded due to their signing of a separate peace (the Treaty of Brest-Litovsk) and early withdrawal from the war. Furthermore, German negotiators were excluded to deny them an opportunity to divide the Allies diplomatically.

Initially, a "Council of Ten" (comprising two delegates each from Britain, France, the United States, Italy, and Japan) met officially to decide the peace terms. This council was replaced by the "Council of Five", formed from each country's foreign ministers, to discuss minor matters. French Prime Minister Georges Clemenceau, Italian Prime Minister Vittorio Emanuele Orlando, British Prime Minister David Lloyd George, and United States President Woodrow Wilson formed the "Big Four" (at one point becoming the "Big Three" following the temporary withdrawal of Orlando). These four men met in 145 closed sessions to make all the major decisions, which were later ratified by the entire assembly. The minor powers attended a weekly "Plenary Conference" that discussed issues in a general forum but made no decisions. These members formed over 50 commissions that made various recommendations, many of which were incorporated into the final text of the treaty.

=== French aims ===
France had lost 1.3 million soldiers, including 25% of French men aged 18–30, as well as 400,000 civilians. France had also been more physically damaged than any other nation; the so-called zone rouge (Red Zone), the most industrialized region and the source of most coal and iron ore in the north-east, had been devastated, and in the final days of the war, mines had been flooded and railways, bridges and factories destroyed. Clemenceau intended to ensure the security of France, by weakening Germany economically, militarily, territorially and by supplanting Germany as the leading producer of steel in Europe. British economist and Versailles negotiator John Maynard Keynes summarized this position as attempting to "set the clock back and undo what, since 1870, the progress of Germany had accomplished."

Clemenceau told Wilson: "America is far away, protected by the ocean. Not even Napoleon himself could touch England. You are both sheltered; we are not". The French wanted a frontier on the Rhine, to protect France from a German invasion and compensate for French demographic and economic inferiority. American and British representatives refused the French claim and after two months of negotiations, the French accepted a British pledge to provide an immediate alliance with France if Germany attacked again, and Wilson agreed to put a similar proposal to the Senate. Clemenceau had told the Chamber of Deputies, in December 1918, that his goal was to maintain an alliance with both countries. Clemenceau accepted the offer, in return for an occupation of the Rhineland for fifteen years and that Germany would also demilitarise the Rhineland.

French negotiators required reparations, to make Germany pay for the destruction induced throughout the war and to decrease German strength. The French also wanted the iron ore and coal of the Saar Valley, by annexation to France. The French were willing to accept a smaller amount of World War I reparations than the Americans would concede and Clemenceau was willing to discuss German capacity to pay with the German delegation, before the final settlement was drafted. In April and May 1919, the French and Germans held separate talks, on mutually acceptable arrangements on issues like reparation, reconstruction and industrial collaboration. France, along with the British Dominions and Belgium, opposed League of Nations mandates and favored annexation of former German colonies.

The French, who had suffered significantly in the areas occupied by Germany during the war, were in favour of trying German war criminals, including the Kaiser. In the face of American objections that there was no applicable existing law under which the Kaiser could be tried, Clemenceau took the view that the "law of responsibility" overruled all other laws and that putting the Kaiser on trial offered the opportunity to establish this as an international precedent.

=== British aims ===
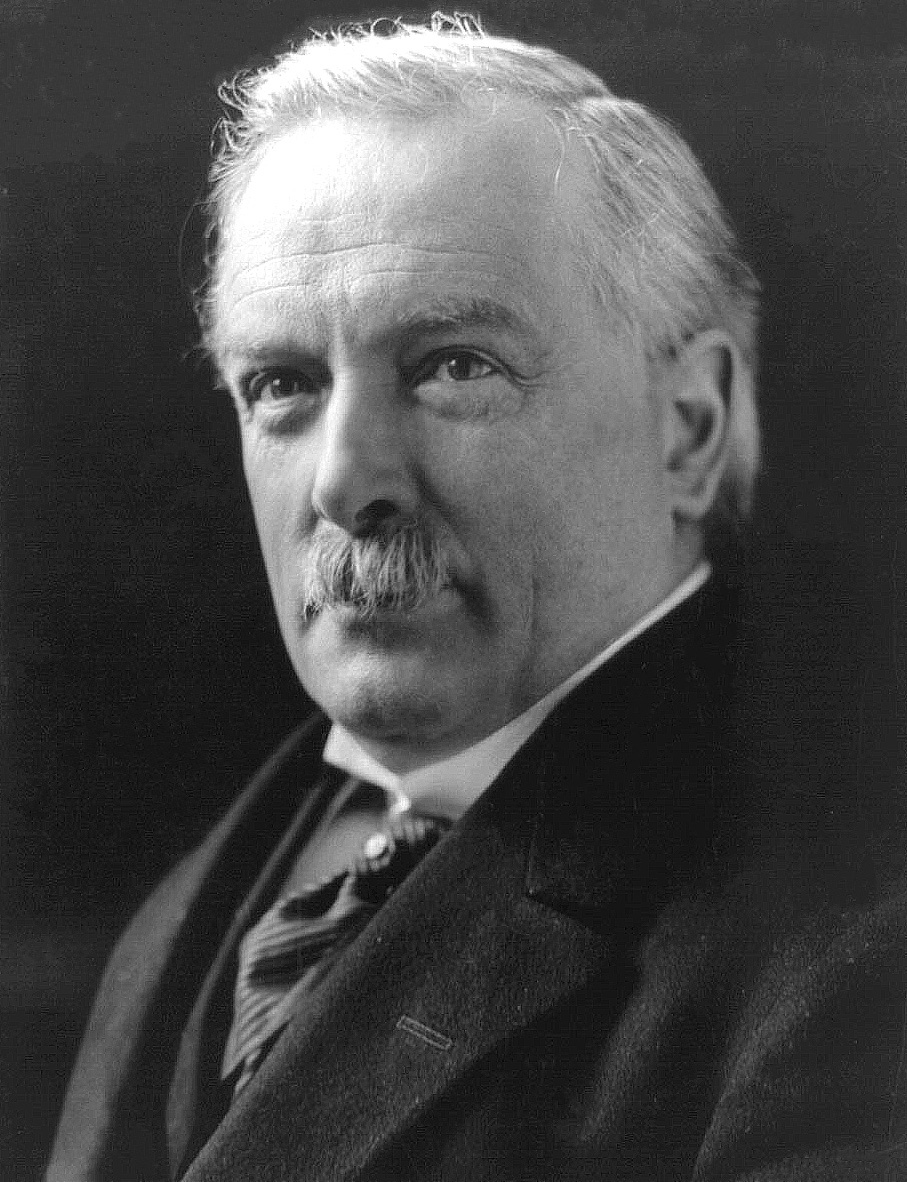
British Prime Minister David Lloyd George

Britain had suffered heavy financial costs but suffered little physical devastation during the war. British public opinion wanted to make Germany pay for the War. Public opinion favoured a "just peace", which would force Germany to pay reparations and be unable to repeat the aggression of 1914, although those of a "liberal and advanced opinion" shared Wilson's ideal of a peace of reconciliation.

In private Lloyd George opposed revenge and attempted to compromise between Clemenceau's demands and the Fourteen Points, because Europe would eventually have to reconcile with Germany. Lloyd George wanted terms of reparation that would not cripple the German economy, so that Germany would remain a viable economic power and trading partner. By arguing that British war pensions and widows' allowances should be included in the German reparation sum, Lloyd George ensured that a large amount would go to the British Empire.

Lloyd George also intended to maintain a European balance of power to thwart a French attempt to establish itself as the dominant European power. A revived Germany would be a counterweight to France and a deterrent to Bolshevik Russia. Lloyd George also wanted to neutralize the German navy to keep the Royal Navy as the greatest naval power in the world; dismantle the German colonial empire with several of its territorial possessions ceded to Britain and others being established as League of Nations mandates, a position opposed by the Dominions.

Together with the French, the British favoured putting German war criminals on trial, and included the Kaiser in this. Already in 1916 Herbert Asquith had declared the intention "to bring to justice the criminals, whoever they be and whatever their station", and a resolution of the war cabinet in 1918 reaffirmed this intent. Lloyd George declared that the British people would not accept a treaty that did not include terms on this, though he wished to limit the charges solely to violation of the 1839 treaty guaranteeing Belgian neutrality. The British were also well aware that the Kaiser having sought refuge in the Netherlands meant that any trial was unlikely to take place and therefore any Article demanding it was likely to be a dead letter.

=== American aims ===
Before the American entry into the war, Wilson had talked of a "peace without victory". This position fluctuated following the US entry into the war. Wilson spoke of the German aggressors, with whom there could be no compromised peace. On 8 January 1918, however, Wilson delivered a speech (known as the Fourteen Points) that declared the American peace objectives: the rebuilding of the European economy, self-determination of European and Middle Eastern ethnic groups, the promotion of free trade, the creation of appropriate mandates for former colonies, and above all, the creation of a powerful League of Nations that would ensure the peace. The aim of the latter was to provide a forum to revise the peace treaties as needed, and deal with problems that arose as a result of the peace and the rise of new states.

Wilson brought along top intellectuals as advisors to the American peace delegation, and the overall American position echoed the Fourteen Points. Wilson firmly opposed harsh treatment on Germany. While the British and French wanted to largely annex the German colonial empire, Wilson saw that as a violation of the fundamental principles of justice and human rights of the native populations, and favored them having the right of self-determination via the creation of mandates. The promoted idea called for the major powers to act as disinterested trustees over a region, aiding the native populations until they could govern themselves. In spite of this position and in order to ensure that Japan did not refuse to join the League of Nations, Wilson favored turning over the former German colony of Shandong, in Eastern China, to the Japanese Empire rather than return the area to the Republic of China's control. Further confounding the Americans, was US internal partisan politics. In November 1918, the Republican Party won the Senate election by a slim margin. Wilson, a Democrat, refused to include prominent Republicans in the American delegation making his efforts seem partisan, and contributed to a risk of political defeat at home.

On the subject of war crimes, the Americans differed to the British and French in that Wilson's proposal was that any trial of the Kaiser should be solely a political and moral affair, and not one of criminal responsibility, meaning that the death penalty would be precluded. This was based on the American view, particularly those of Robert Lansing, that there was no applicable law under which the Kaiser could be tried. Additionally, the Americans favoured trying other German war criminals before military tribunals rather than an international court, with prosecutions being limited to "violation[s] of the laws and customs of war", and opposed any trials based on violations against what was called "laws of humanity".

=== Italian aims ===
Vittorio Emanuele Orlando and his foreign minister Sidney Sonnino, an Anglican of British origins, worked primarily to secure the partition of the Habsburg Empire and their attitude towards Germany was not as hostile. Generally speaking, Sonnino was in line with the British position while Orlando favored a compromise between Clemenceau and Wilson. Within the negotiations for the Treaty of Versailles, Orlando obtained certain results such as the permanent membership of Italy in the security council of the League of Nations and a promised transfer of British Jubaland and French Aozou strip to the Italian colonies of Somalia and Libya respectively. Italian nationalists, however, saw the War as a "mutilated victory" for what they considered to be little territorial gains achieved in the other treaties directly impacting Italy's borders. Orlando was ultimately forced to abandon the conference and resign. Orlando refused to see World War I as a mutilated victory, replying at nationalists calling for a greater expansion that "Italy today is a great state....on par with the great historic and contemporary states. This is, for me, our main and principal expansion." Francesco Saverio Nitti took Orlando's place in signing the treaty of Versailles.

The Italian leadership were divided on whether to try the Kaiser. Sonnino considered that putting the Kaiser on trial could result in him becoming a "patriotic martyr". Orlando, in contrast, stated that "the ex-Kaiser ought to pay like other criminals", but was less sure about whether the Kaiser should be tried as a criminal or merely have a political verdict cast against him. Orlando also considered that "[t]he question of the constitution of the Court presents almost insurmountable difficulties".

== Treaty content and signing ==
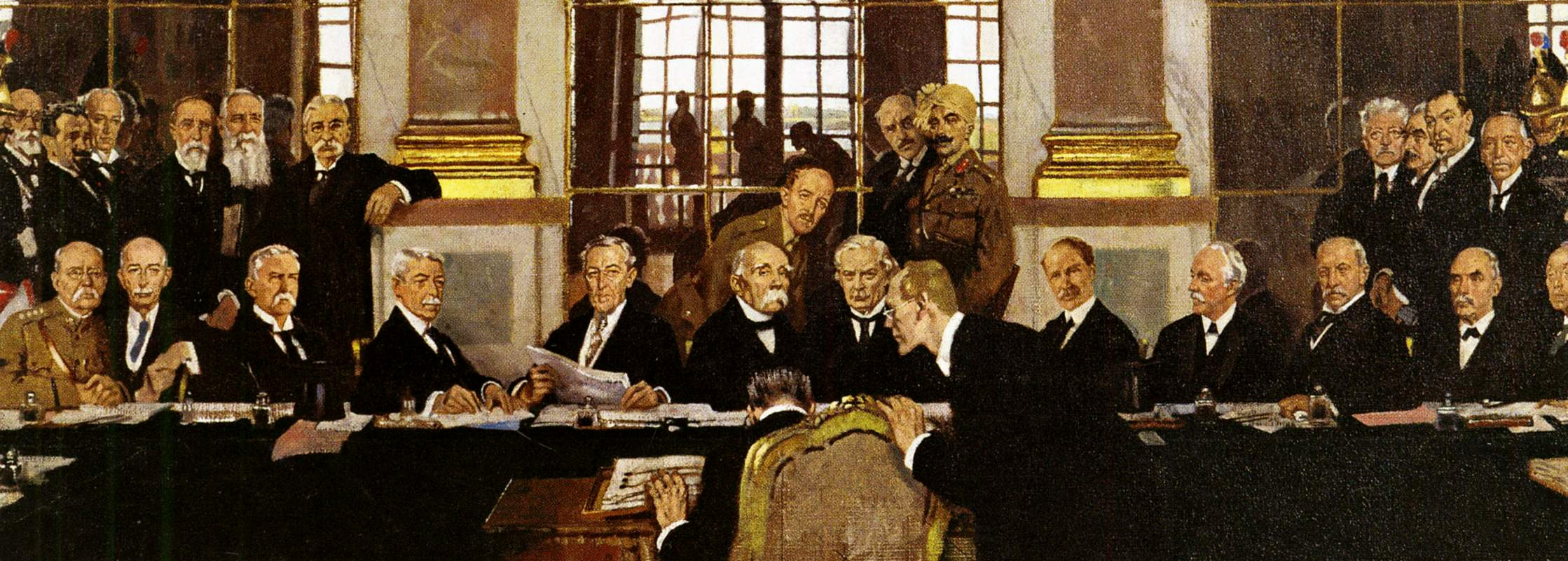
German delegate Johannes Bell signing the Treaty of Versailles in the Hall of Mirrors, with various Allied delegations sitting and standing in front of him

In June 1919, the Allies declared that war would resume if the German government did not sign the treaty they had agreed to among themselves. The government headed by Philipp Scheidemann was unable to agree on a common position, and Scheidemann himself resigned rather than agree to sign the treaty. Gustav Bauer, the head of the new government, sent a telegram stating his intention to sign the treaty if certain articles were withdrawn, including Articles 227 to 231 (i.e., the Articles related to the extradition of the Kaiser for trial, the extradition of German war criminals for trial before Allied tribunals, the handing over of documents relevant for war crimes trials, and accepting liability for war reparations). (Note: See the Reparations section.) In response, the Allies issued an ultimatum stating that Germany would have to accept the treaty or face an invasion of Allied forces across the Rhine within 24 hours. On 23 June, Bauer capitulated and sent a second telegram with a confirmation that a German delegation would arrive shortly to sign the treaty. On 28 June 1919, the fifth anniversary of the assassination of Archduke Franz Ferdinand (the immediate impetus for the war), the peace treaty was signed. The treaty had clauses ranging from war crimes, the prohibition on the merging of the Republic of German Austria with Germany without the consent of the League of Nations, freedom of navigation on major European rivers, to the returning of a Quran to the king of Hedjaz. (Note: Articles 227–230) (Note: Article 80) (Note: Part XII) (Note: Article 246)

The treaty itself was signed in the Hall of Mirrors in the Palace of Versailles, which had considerable historical resonance. The Second German Empire had been proclaimed in the Hall of Mirrors in 1871, after the German siege of Paris at the conclusion of the Franco-Prussian War, which deeply humiliated the French. French Prime Minister Georges Clemenceau consciously chose the Hall of Mirrors as the site to sign the Treaty of Versailles, thus dismantling the German Empire in the very room where it had been proclaimed.

=== Territorial changes ===
Germany after Versailles: Administered by the League of Nations Annexed or transferred to neighbouring countries by the treaty, or later via plebiscite and League of Nations action Weimar Germany

The treaty stripped Germany of 65,000 km^{2} (25,000 sq mi) of territory and 7 million people. It also required Germany to give up the gains made via the Treaty of Brest-Litovsk and grant independence to the protectorates that had been established. In Western Europe, Germany was required to recognize Belgian sovereignty over Moresnet and cede control of the Eupen-Malmedy area. Within six months of the transfer, Belgium was required to conduct a plebiscite on whether the citizens of the region wanted to remain under Belgian sovereignty or return to German control, communicate the results to the League of Nations and abide by the League's decision. (Note: Articles 33 and 34.) The Belgian transitional administration, under High Commissioner General Herman Baltia, was responsible for the organisation and control of this process, held between January and June 1920. The plebiscite itself was held without a secret ballot, and organized as a consultation in which all citizens who opposed the annexation had to formally register their protest. Ultimately, only 271 of 33,726 voters signed the protest list, of which 202 were German state servants. After the Belgian government reported this result, the League of Nations confirmed the change of status on 20 September 1920, with the line of the German-Belgian border finally fixed by a League of Nations commission in 1922. To compensate for the destruction of French coal mines, Germany was to cede the output of the Saar coalmines to France and control of the Saar to the League of Nations for 15 years; a plebiscite would then be held to decide sovereignty. (Note: Articles 45 and 49) The treaty restored the provinces of Alsace-Lorraine to France by rescinding the treaties of Versailles and Frankfurt of 1871 as they pertained to this issue. (Note: Section V preamble and Article 51) France was able to make the claim that the provinces of Alsace-Lorraine were indeed part of France and not part of Germany by disclosing a letter sent from the Prussian King to the Empress Eugénie that Eugénie provided, in which William I wrote that the territories of Alsace-Lorraine were requested by Germany for the sole purpose of national defense and not to expand the German territory. The sovereignty of Schleswig-Holstein was to be resolved by a plebiscite to be held at a future time (see Schleswig Plebiscites).

In Central Europe Germany was to recognize the independence of Czechoslovakia and cede parts of the province of Upper Silesia to them. (Note: Articles 81 and 83) Germany had to recognize the independence of Poland, which had regained its independence following a national revolution against the occupying Central Powers, and renounce "all rights and title" over Polish territory. Portions of Upper Silesia were to be ceded to Poland, with the future of the rest of the province to be decided by plebiscite. The border would be fixed with regard to the vote and to the geographical and economic conditions of each locality. (Note: Article 88 and annex) The Province of Posen (now Poznań), which had come under Polish control during the Greater Poland Uprising, was also to be ceded to Poland. Pomerelia (Eastern Pomerania), on historical and ethnic grounds, was transferred to Poland so that the new state could have access to the sea and became known as the Polish Corridor. The sovereignty of part of southern East Prussia was to be decided via plebiscite while the East Prussian Soldau area, which was astride the rail line between Warsaw and Danzig, was transferred to Poland outright without plebiscite. (Note: Article 94) An area of 51,800 square kilometres (20,000 square miles) was transferred to Poland under the agreement. Memel was to be ceded to the Allied and Associated powers, for disposal according to their wishes. (Note: Article 99) Germany was to cede the city of Danzig and its hinterland, including the delta of the Vistula River on the Baltic Sea, for the League of Nations to establish the Free City of Danzig. (Note: Articles 100–104)

=== Mandates ===
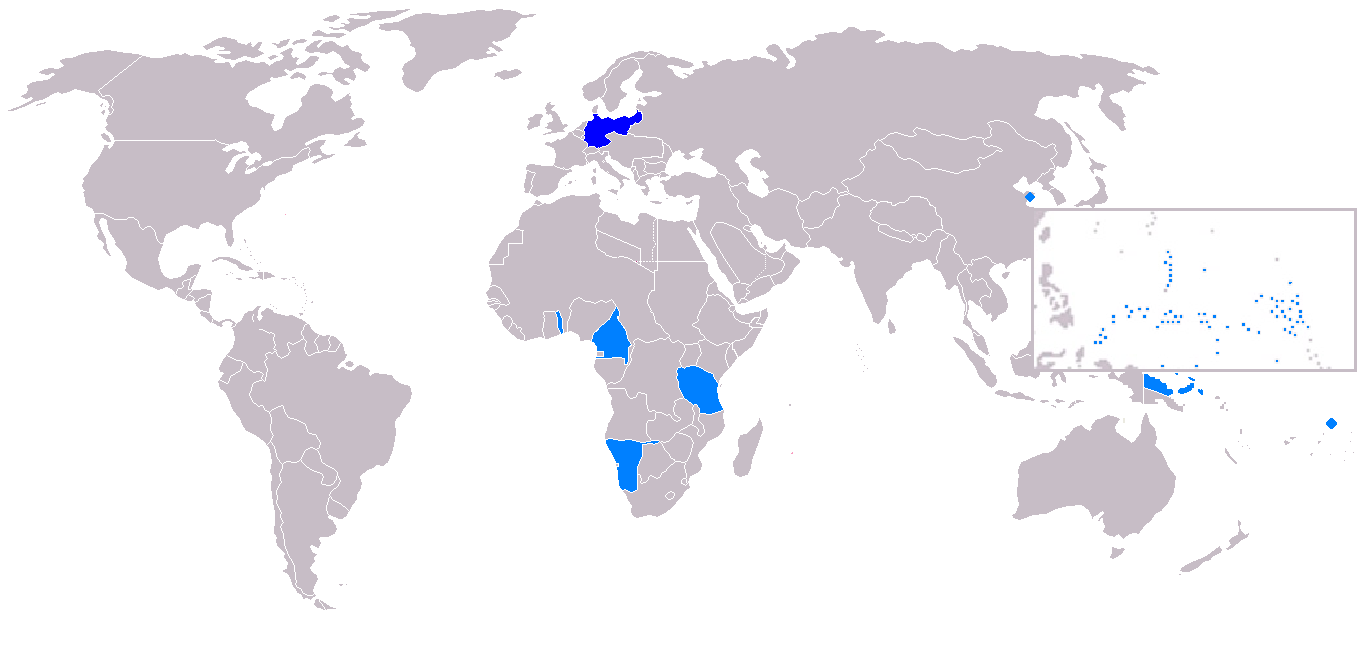
German colonies (light blue) were made into League of Nations mandates.

Article 119 of the treaty required Germany to renounce sovereignty over former colonies and Article 22 converted the territories into League of Nations mandates under the control of Allied states. (Note: Article 22 and Article 119) Togoland and German Kamerun (Cameroon) were transferred to France, aside from portions given to Britain, British Togoland and British Cameroon. Ruanda and Urundi were allocated to Belgium, whereas German South-West Africa went to South Africa and Britain obtained German East Africa. As compensation for the German invasion of Portuguese Africa, Portugal was granted the Kionga Triangle, a sliver of German East Africa in northern Mozambique. Article 156 of the treaty transferred German concessions in Shandong, China, to Japan, not to China. Japan was granted all German possessions in the Pacific north of the equator and those south of the equator went to Australia, except for German Samoa, which given to the British Empire. (Note: Article 156)

=== Military restrictions ===
The treaty was comprehensive and complex in the restrictions imposed upon the post-war German armed forces (the Reichswehr). The provisions were intended to make the Reichswehr incapable of offensive action and to encourage international disarmament. (Note: Part V preamble) Germany was to demobilize sufficient soldiers by 31 March 1920 to leave an army of no more than 100,000 men in a maximum of seven infantry and three cavalry divisions. The treaty laid down the organisation of the divisions and support units, and the German General Staff was to be dissolved. (Note: Articles 159, 160, 163 and Table 1) Military schools for officer training were limited to three, one school per arm, and conscription was abolished. Private soldiers and non-commissioned officers were to be retained for at least twelve years and officers for a minimum of 25 years, with former officers being forbidden to attend military exercises. To prevent Germany from building up a large cadre of trained men, the number of men allowed to leave early was limited. (Note: Articles 173, 174, 175 and 176)

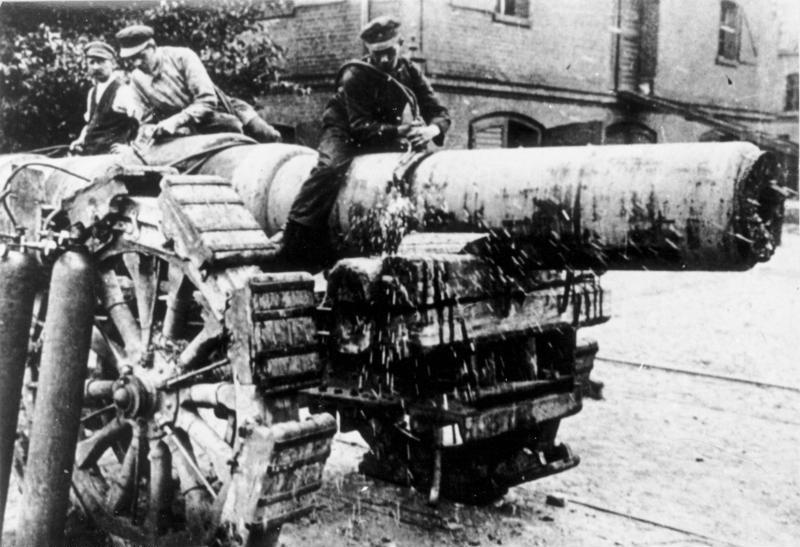
Workmen decommissioning a heavy gun (likely 28 cm Haubitze L/14 i.R.), to comply with the treaty.

The number of civilian staff supporting the army was reduced and the police force was reduced to its pre-war size, with increases limited to population increases; paramilitary forces were forbidden. (Note: Articles 161, 162, and 176) The Rhineland was to be demilitarized, all fortifications in the Rhineland and 50 kilometres (31 miles) east of the river were to be demolished and new construction was forbidden. (Note: Articles 42, 43, and 180) Military structures and fortifications on the islands of Heligoland and Düne were to be destroyed. (Note: Article 115) Germany was prohibited from the arms trade, limits were imposed on the type and quantity of weapons and prohibited from the manufacture or stockpile of chemical weapons, armoured cars, tanks and military aircraft. (Note: Articles 165, 170, 171, 172, 198 and tables No. II and III.) The German navy was allowed six pre-dreadnought battleships and was limited to a maximum of six light cruisers (not exceeding 6,000 long tons (6,100 t)), twelve destroyers (not exceeding 800 long tons (810 t)) and twelve torpedo boats (not exceeding 200 long tons (200 t)) and was forbidden submarines. (Note: Articles 181 and 190) The manpower of the navy was not to exceed 15,000 men, including manning for the fleet, coast defences, signal stations, administration, other land services, officers and men of all grades and corps. The number of officers and warrant officers was not allowed to exceed 1,500 men. Germany surrendered eight battleships, eight light cruisers, forty-two destroyers, and fifty torpedo boats for decommissioning. Thirty-two auxiliary ships were to be disarmed and converted to merchant use. (Note: Articles 185 and 187) Article 198 prohibited Germany from having an air force, including naval air forces, and required Germany to hand over all aerial related materials. In conjunction, Germany was forbidden to manufacture or import aircraft or related material for a period of six months following the signing of the treaty. (Note: Articles 198, 201, and 202)

=== Reparations ===
In Article 231 Germany accepted responsibility for the losses and damages caused by the war "as a consequence of the ... aggression of Germany and her allies." (Note: Article 231) (Note: Similar wording was used in the treaties signed by the other defeated nations of the Central Powers: Article 177 of the Treaty of Saint-Germain-en-Laye with Austria; Article 161 of the Treaty of Trianon with Hungary; Article 121 of the Treaty Areas of Neuilly-sur-Seine with Bulgaria; and Article 231 of the Treaty of Sevres with Turkey. (Note: Treaty of Saint-Germain-en-Laye, Article 177) (Note: Treaty of Trianon, Article 161) (Note: Treaty of Neuilly-sur-Seine, Article 121) (Note: Treaty of Sèvres, Article 231)) The treaty required Germany to compensate the Allied powers, and it also established an Allied "Reparation Commission" to determine the exact amount which Germany would pay and the form that such payment would take. The commission was required to "give to the German Government a just opportunity to be heard", and to submit its conclusions by 1 May 1921. In the interim, the treaty required Germany to pay an equivalent of 20 billion gold marks ($5 billion) in gold, commodities, ships, securities or other forms. The money would help to pay for Allied occupation costs and buy food and raw materials for Germany. (Note: Articles 232–235)

=== Guarantees ===
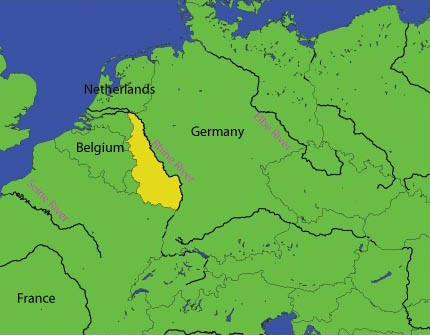
Location of the Rhineland (yellow)

To ensure compliance, the Rhineland and bridgeheads east of the Rhine were to be occupied by Allied troops for fifteen years. (Note: Article 428) If Germany had not committed aggression, a staged withdrawal would take place; after five years, the Cologne bridgehead and the territory north of a line along the Ruhr would be evacuated. After ten years, the bridgehead at Coblenz and the territories to the north would be evacuated and after fifteen years remaining Allied forces would be withdrawn. (Note: Article 429) If Germany reneged on the treaty obligations, the bridgeheads would be reoccupied immediately. (Note: Article 430)

=== International organizations ===
Part I of the treaty, in common with all the treaties signed during the Paris Peace Conference, (Note: see The Treaty of Saint-Germain-en-Laye, The Treaty of Trianon, The Treaty of Neuilly, and The Treaty of Sèvres.) was the Covenant of the League of Nations, which provided for the creation of the League, an organization for the arbitration of international disputes. (Note: Part I) Part XIII organized the establishment of the International Labour Office, to regulate hours of work, including a maximum working day and week; the regulation of the labour supply; the prevention of unemployment; the provision of a living wage; the protection of the worker against sickness, disease and injury arising out of his employment; the protection of children, young persons and women; provision for old age and injury; protection of the interests of workers when employed abroad; recognition of the principle of freedom of association; the organization of vocational and technical education and other measures. (Note: Constitution of the International Labour Office Part XIII preamble and Article 388) The treaty also called for the signatories to sign or ratify the First International Opium Convention. (Note: Article 295)

=== War Crimes ===
Article 227 of the Versailles treaty required the handing over of Kaiser Wilhelm for trial "for supreme offence against international treaties and the sanctity of treaties" before a bench of five allied judges – one British, one American, one French, one Italian, and one Japanese. If found guilty the judges were to "fix such punishment which it considers should be imposed". The death penalty was therefore not precluded. Article 228 allowed the Allies to demand the extradition of German war criminals, who could be tried before military tribunals for crimes against "the laws and customs of war" under Article 229. To provide an evidentiary basis for such trials, Article 230 required the German government to transfer information and documents relevant to such trials.

== Reactions ==
=== Britain ===
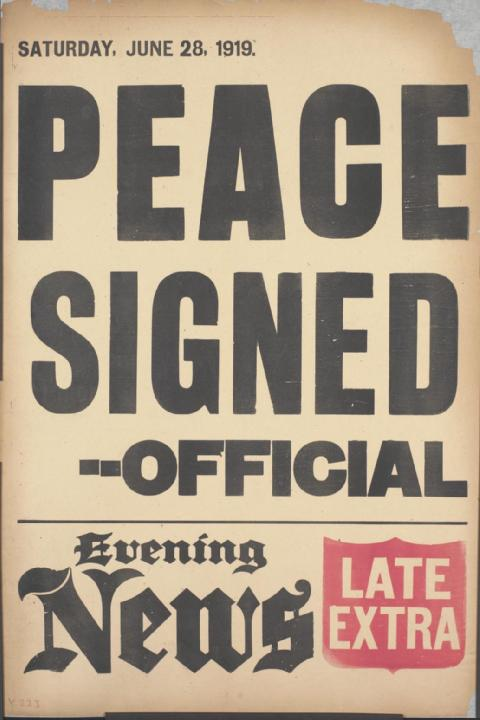
A British news placard announcing the signing of the peace treaty

The delegates of the Commonwealth and British Government had mixed thoughts on the treaty, with some seeing the French policy as being greedy and vindictive. Lloyd George and his private secretary Philip Kerr believed in the treaty, although they also felt that the French would keep Europe in a constant state of turmoil by attempting to enforce the treaty. Delegate Harold Nicolson wrote "are we making a good peace?", while General Jan Smuts (a member of the South African delegation) wrote to Lloyd-George, before the signing, that the treaty was unstable and declared "Are we in our sober senses or suffering from shellshock? What has become of Wilson's 14 points?" He wanted the Germans not be made to sign at the "point of the bayonet". Smuts issued a statement condemning the treaty and regretting that the promises of "a new international order and a fairer, better world are not written in this treaty". Lord Robert Cecil said that many within the Foreign Office were disappointed by the treaty. The treaty received widespread approval from the general public. Bernadotte Schmitt wrote that the "average Englishman ... thought Germany got only what it deserved" as a result of the treaty, but public opinion changed as German complaints mounted.

Former wartime British Prime Minister H. H. Asquith and the Independent Liberal opposition in the British Parliament after the 1918 general election believed the treaty was too punitive. Asquith campaigned against it while running for another House of Commons seat in the 1920 Paisley by-election.

Prime Minister Ramsay MacDonald, following the German re-militarisation of the Rhineland in 1936, stated that he was "pleased" that the treaty was "vanishing", expressing his hope that the French had been taught a "severe lesson".

==== Status of British Dominions ====
The Treaty of Versailles was an important step in the status of the British Dominions under international law. Australia, Canada, New Zealand and South Africa had each made significant contributions to the British war effort, but as separate countries, rather than as British colonies. India also made a substantial troop contribution, although under direct British control, unlike the Dominions. The four Dominions and India all signed the Treaty separately from Britain, a clear recognition by the international community that the Dominions were no longer British colonies. "Their status defied exact analysis by both international and constitutional lawyers, but it was clear that they were no longer regarded simply as colonies of Britain." By signing the Treaty individually, the four Dominions and India also were founding members of the League of Nations in their own right, rather than simply as part of the British Empire.

=== France ===
The signing of the treaty was met with roars of approval, singing, and dancing from a crowd outside the Palace of Versailles. In Paris proper, people rejoiced at the official end of the war, the return of Alsace and Lorraine to France, and that Germany had agreed to pay reparations.

While France ratified the treaty and was active in the League, the jubilant mood soon gave way to a political backlash for Clemenceau. The French Right saw the treaty as being too lenient and saw it as failing to achieve all of France's demands. Left-wing politicians attacked the treaty and Clemenceau for being too harsh (the latter turning into a ritual condemnation of the treaty, for politicians remarking on French foreign affairs, as late as August 1939). Marshal Ferdinand Foch stated "this (treaty) is not peace. It is an armistice for twenty years."; a criticism over the failure to annex the Rhineland and for compromising French security for the benefit of the United States and Britain. When Clemenceau stood for election as President of France in January 1920, he was defeated.

=== Italy ===
Reaction in the Kingdom of Italy to the treaty was extremely negative. The country had suffered high casualties, yet failed to achieve most of its major war goals, notably gaining control of the Dalmatian coast and Fiume. President Wilson rejected Italy's claims on the basis of "national self-determination." For their part, Britain and France—who had been forced in the war's latter stages to divert their own troops to the Italian front to stave off collapse—were disinclined to support Italy's position at the peace conference. Differences in negotiating strategy between Premier Vittorio Orlando and Foreign Minister Sidney Sonnino further undermined Italy's position at the conference. A furious Vittorio Orlando suffered a nervous collapse and at one point walked out of the conference (though he later returned). He lost his position as prime minister just a week before the treaty was scheduled to be signed, effectively ending his active political career. Anger and dismay over the treaty's provisions helped pave the way for the establishment of Benito Mussolini's Fascist dictatorship three years later.

=== Portugal ===
Portugal entered the war on the Allied side in 1916 primarily to ensure the security of its African colonies, which were threatened with seizure by both Britain and Germany. To this extent, she succeeded in her war aims. The treaty recognized Portuguese sovereignty over these areas and awarded her small portions of Germany's bordering overseas colonies, including the Kionga Triangle. Otherwise, Portugal gained little at the peace conference: a promised share of German reparations never materialized, and a coveted seat on the executive council of the new League of Nations went instead to Spain, which had remained neutral in the war. In the end, Portugal ratified the treaty, but got little out of the war, which cost more than 8,000 Portuguese Armed Forces troops and as many as 100,000 African colonial subjects their lives.

=== United States ===
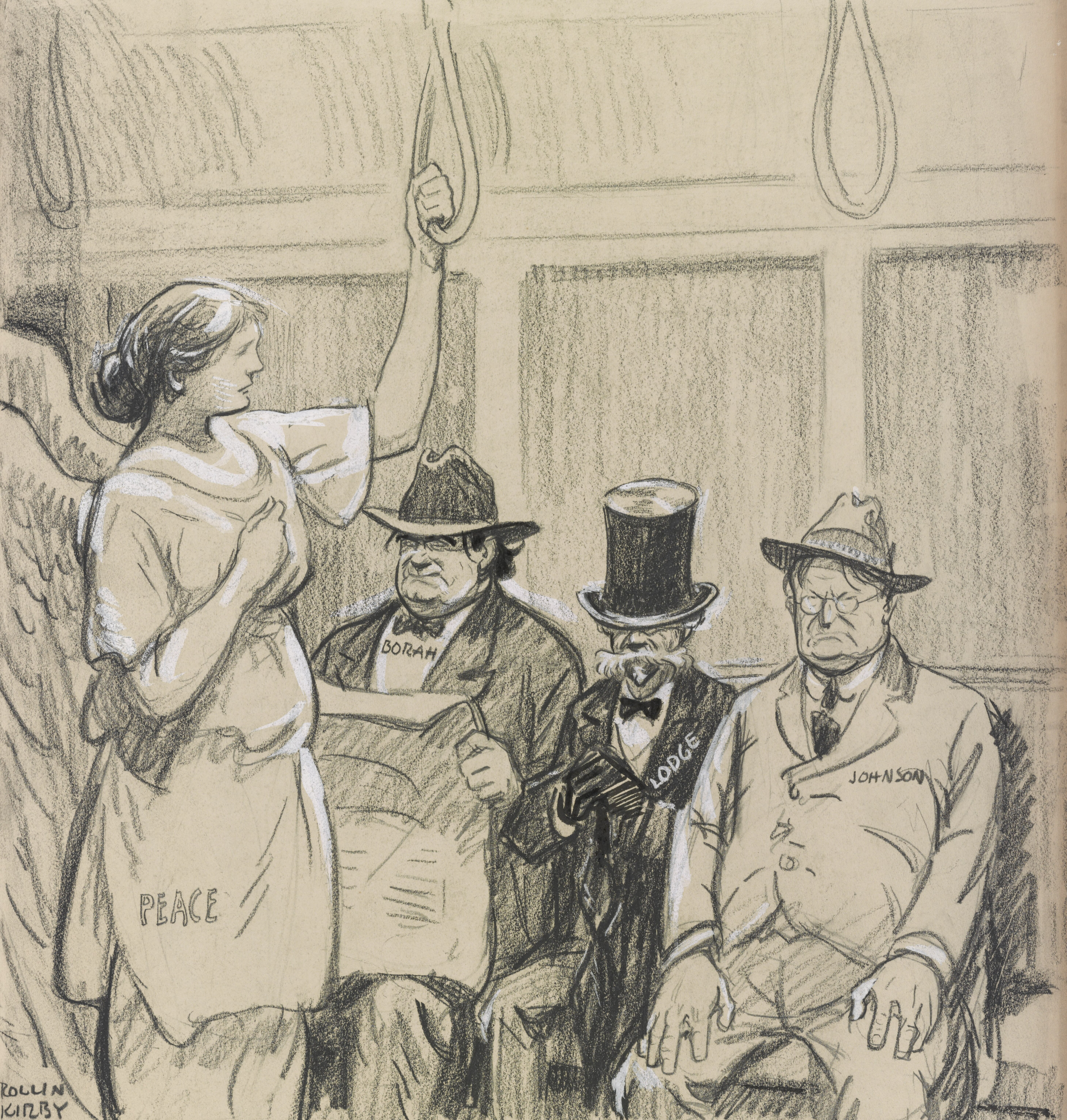
Senators Borah, Lodge and Johnson refuse Lady Peace a seat, referring to efforts by Republican isolationists to block ratification of the Treaty of Versailles establishing the League of Nations.

After the Versailles conference, Democratic President Woodrow Wilson claimed that "at last the world knows America as the savior of the world!" (Note: President Woodrow Wilson speaking on the League of Nations to a luncheon audience in Portland OR. 66th Cong., 1st sess. Senate Documents: Addresses of President Wilson (May–November 1919), vol. 11, no. 120, p. 206.) However, Wilson had refused to bring any leading members of the Republican party, led by Henry Cabot Lodge, into the talks. The Republicans controlled the United States Senate after the election of 1918, and were outraged by Wilson's refusal to discuss the war with them. The senators were divided into multiple positions on the Versailles question. It proved possible to build a majority coalition, but impossible to build a two-thirds coalition that was needed to pass a treaty.

A discontent bloc of 12–18 "Irreconcilables", mostly Republicans but also representatives of the Irish and German Democrats, fiercely opposed the treaty. One bloc of Democrats strongly supported the Versailles Treaty, even with reservations added by Lodge. A second group of Democrats supported the treaty but followed Wilson in opposing any amendments or reservations. The largest bloc, led by Senator Lodge, comprised a majority of the Republicans. They wanted a treaty with "reservations", especially on Article 10, so that the League of Nations could not draw the US into war without the consent of the US Congress. All of the Irreconcilables were bitter enemies of President Wilson, and he launched a nationwide speaking tour in the summer of 1919 to refute them. But Wilson collapsed midway with a serious stroke that effectively ruined his leadership skills.

The closest the treaty came to passage was on 19 November 1919, as Lodge and his Republicans formed a coalition with the pro-treaty Democrats, and were close to a two-thirds majority for a Treaty with reservations, but Wilson rejected this compromise and enough Democrats followed his lead to end the chances of ratification permanently. Among the American public as a whole, the Irish Catholics and the German Americans were intensely opposed to the treaty, saying it favored the British.

After Wilson's presidency, his successor Republican President Warren G. Harding continued American opposition to the formation of the League of Nations. Congress subsequently passed the Knox–Porter Resolution bringing a formal end to hostilities between the United States and the Central Powers. It was signed into law by President Harding on 2 July 1921. Soon after, the US–German Peace Treaty of 1921 was signed in Berlin on 25 August 1921. Article 1 of this treaty obliged the German government to grant to the U.S. government all rights and privileges that were enjoyed by the other Allies that had ratified the Versailles treaty. Two similar treaties were signed with Austria and Hungary on 24 and 29 August 1921, in Vienna and Budapest respectively.

==== Edward House's views ====
Wilson's former friend Edward Mandell House, present at the negotiations, wrote in his diary on 29 June 1919:

I am leaving Paris, after eight fateful months, with conflicting emotions. Looking at the conference in retrospect, there is much to approve and yet much to regret. It is easy to say what should have been done, but more difficult to have found a way of doing it. To those who are saying that the treaty is bad and should never have been made and that it will involve Europe in infinite difficulties in its enforcement, I feel like admitting it. But I would also say in reply that empires cannot be shattered, and new states raised upon their ruins without disturbance. To create new boundaries is to create new troubles. The one follows the other. While I should have preferred a different peace, I doubt very much whether it could have been made, for the ingredients required for such a peace as I would have were lacking at Paris.

=== China ===
Many in China felt betrayed as the German territory in China was handed to Japan. Wellington Koo refused to sign the treaty and the Chinese delegation at the Paris Peace Conference was the only nation that did not sign the Treaty of Versailles at the signing ceremony. The sense of betrayal led to great demonstrations in China such as the May 4th movement. There was immense dissatisfaction with Duan Qirui's government, which had secretly negotiated with the Japanese in order to secure loans to fund their military campaigns against the south. On 12 June 1919, the Chinese cabinet was forced to resign and the government instructed its delegation at Versailles not to sign the treaty. As a result, relations with the Western world deteriorated.

=== Germany ===
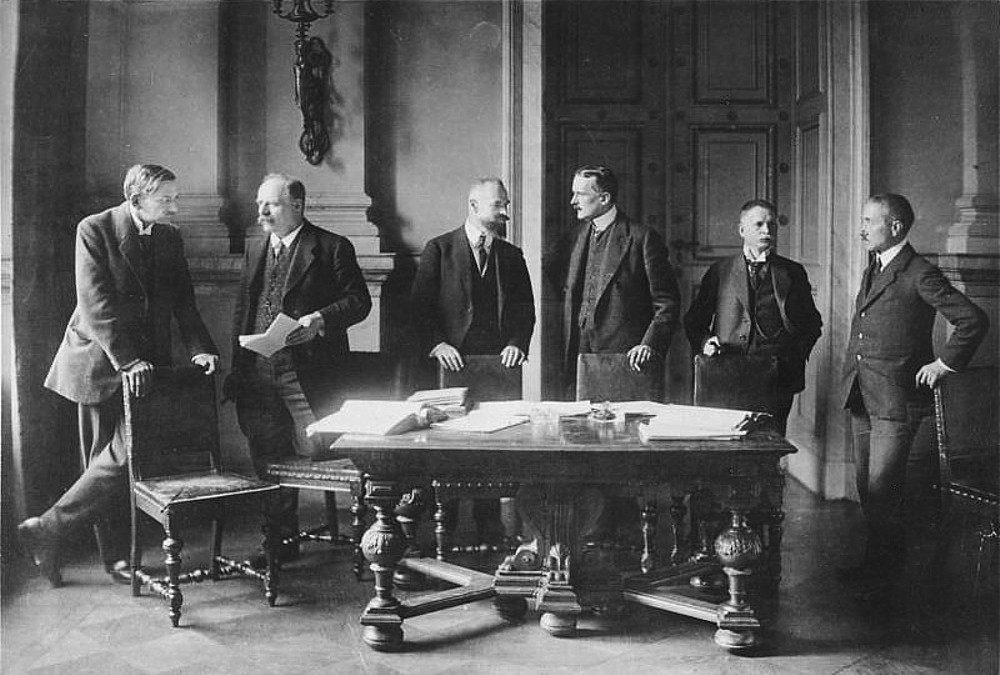
German delegates in Versailles: Professor Walther Schücking, Reichspostminister Johannes Giesberts, Justice Minister Otto Landsberg, Foreign Minister Ulrich Graf von Brockdorff-Rantzau, Prussian State President Robert Leinert, and financial advisor Carl Melchior

On 29 April, the German delegation under the leadership of the Foreign Minister Ulrich Graf von Brockdorff-Rantzau arrived in Versailles. On 7 May, when faced with the conditions dictated by the victors, including the so-called "War Guilt Clause", von Brockdorff-Rantzau replied to Clemenceau, Wilson and Lloyd George: "We can sense the full force of hatred that confronts us here. ... You demand from us to confess we were the only guilty party of war; such a confession in my mouth would be a lie." (Note: "wir kennen die Wucht des Hasses, die uns hier entgegentritt ... Es wird von uns verlangt, daß wir uns als die allein Schuldigen am Kriege bekennen; ein solches Bekenntnis wäre in meinem Munde eine Lüge." (Weimarer Republik n.d.)) Because Germany was not allowed to take part in the negotiations, the German government issued a protest against what it considered to be unfair demands, and a "violation of honour", soon afterwards withdrawing from the proceedings of the peace conference.

Germans of all political shades denounced the treaty. The so-called "War Guilt Clause" that they saw as blaming Germany for starting the war was seen as an insult to the nation's honour. The clauses calling on the Germans to hand over alleged war criminals also caused deep offence, as many of those accused were seen as heroes, and also because the Allies were seen as applying one-sided justice. They referred to the treaty as "the Diktat" since its terms were presented to Germany on a take-it-or-leave-it basis. Germany's first democratically elected head of government, Philipp Scheidemann, resigned rather than sign the treaty. In an emotional and polemical address to the Weimar National Assembly on 12 May 1919, he called the treaty a "horrific and murderous witch's hammer", and exclaimed:

Which hand would not shrivel, that shackled itself and us in such a way?

At the end of his speech, Scheidemann stated that, in the government's opinion, the treaty was unacceptable.

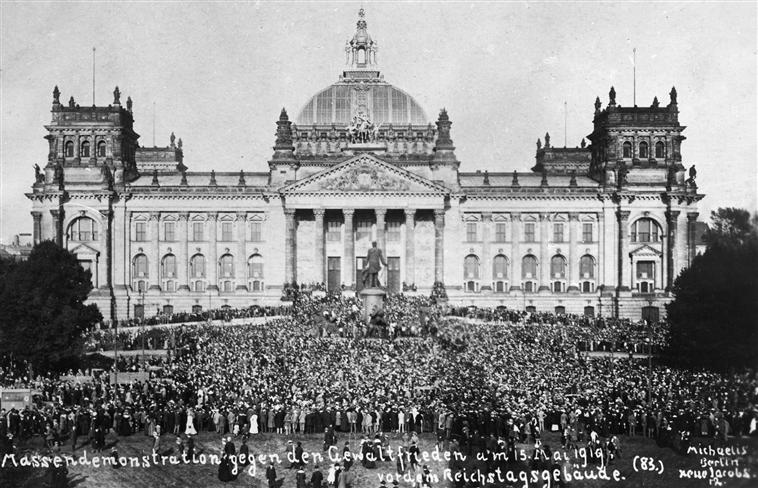
Demonstration against the treaty in front of the Reichstag

After Scheidemann's resignation, a new coalition government was formed under Gustav Bauer. President Friedrich Ebert knew that Germany was in an impossible situation. Although he shared his countrymen's disgust with the treaty, he was sober enough to consider the possibility that the government would not be in a position to reject it. He believed that if Germany refused to sign the treaty, the Allies would invade Germany from the west—and there was no guarantee that the army would be able to make a stand in the event of an invasion. With this in mind, he asked Field Marshal Paul von Hindenburg if the army was capable of any meaningful resistance in the event the Allies resumed the war. If there was even the slightest chance that the army could hold out, Ebert intended to recommend against ratifying the treaty. Hindenburg—after prodding from his chief of staff, Wilhelm Groener—concluded the army could not resume the war even on a limited scale. But rather than inform Ebert himself, he had Groener inform the government that the army would be in an untenable position in the event of renewed hostilities.

Upon receiving Hindenburg's answer, the Bauer government recommended signing the treaty with the proviso that the "war-guilt" clause and the articles that required the extradition of war criminals and of the former Emperor be excluded. After the Allies refused anything other than full acceptance of the treaty, the National Assembly voted in favour of signing it by 237 to 138, with five abstentions (there were 421 delegates in total). The result was wired to Clemenceau just hours before the deadline. The Bauer government included the following statement with the acceptance:

The honour of the German people will not be affected by an act of violence. After the appalling suffering of the last four years, the German people lack any means to defend it externally. Therefore, yielding to overwhelming force and without abandoning its view of the outrageous injustice of the peace terms, the Government of the German Republic declares that it is prepared to accept and sign the peace terms imposed by the Allied and Associated Governments.

Foreign minister Hermann Müller and colonial minister Johannes Bell travelled to Versailles to sign the treaty on behalf of Germany. The treaty was signed on 28 June 1919 and ratified by the National Assembly on 9 July by a vote of 209 to 116.

=== Japan ===
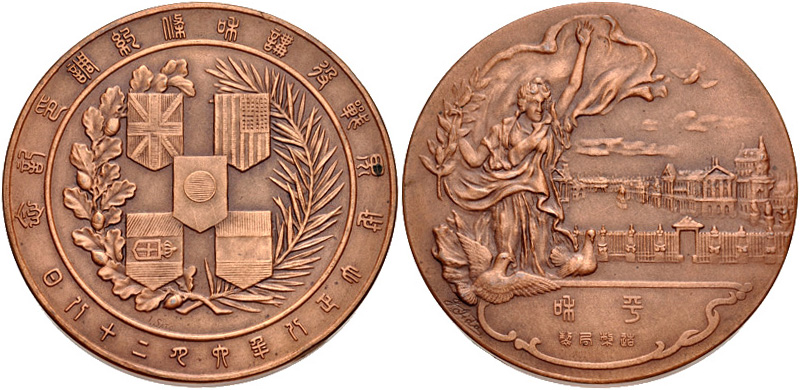
Medal issued by the Japanese authorities in 1919, commemorating the Treaty of Versailles. Obv: Flags of the five allies of World War I. Rev: Peace standing in Oriental attire with the Palace of Versailles in the background

The disenfranchised and often colonized "non-white" world held high expectations that a new order would open up an unheralded opportunity to have a principle of racial equality recognized by the leading global powers. Japanese diplomacy had bitter memories of the rhetoric of the Yellow Peril, and the arrogance, underwritten by the assumptions about a White Man's Burden, memories aggravated by the rise of racial discrimination against their business men, severe immigration restrictions on Asiatics, and court judgments hostile to Japanese interests, which characterized Western states' treatment of their nationals. Japan's delegation, among whose plenipotentiaries figured Baron Makino and Ambassador Chinda Sutemi, was led by its elder statesman Saionji Kinmochi.

Versailles represented a chance to overturn this imposed inferiority, whose tensions were strengthened particularly in Japan's relationship with the United States during WW1. Confidence in their growing industrial strength, and conquest of Germany's Far East possessions, together with their proven fidelity to the Entente would, it was thought, allow them finally to take their rightful place among the victorious Great Powers. They solicited support especially from the American delegation to obtain recognition for the principle of racial equality at the League of Nations Commission. Their proposals to this end were consistently rebuffed by British, French, American and Australian diplomats, who were all sensitive to their respective countries' internal pressures. Wilson himself was an enactor of segregationist policies in the United States, Clemenceau openly ridiculed them, Arthur Balfour considered Africans inferior to Europeans – equality was only true of people within particular nations – while William Hughes, adopting a "slap the Jap" attitude, was a vocal defender of a White Australia policy.

Japan's attempt, buttressed by the Chinese emissary Wellington Koo among others, to incorporate a Racial Equality Proposal in the treaty, had broad support, but was effectively declined when it was rejected by the United States, Great Britain and Australia, despite a powerfully persuasive speech delivered by Makino. (Note: "The whole purpose of the league", began Makino, was "to regulate the conduct of nations and peoples toward one another, according to a higher moral standard than has reigned in the past, and to administer justice throughout the world." In this regard, the wrongs of racial discrimination have been, and continue to be, the source of "profound resentment on the part of large numbers of the human race", directly affecting their rights and their pride. Many nations fought in the recent war to create a new international order, he said, and the hopes of their nationals now have risen to new heights with victory. Given the objectives of the league, the wrongs of the past, and the aspirations of the future, stated Makino, the leaders of the world gathered in Paris should openly declare their support for at least "the principle of equality of nations and just treatment of their nationals" (Lauren 1978, p. 270).)

Japan itself both prior to and during WW1 had embarked on a vigorous expansion of continental colonialism, whose aims were justified in terms of uniting Asians, such as Koreans and Chinese, who were seen as belonging to the same race and culture as the Japanese (dōbun dōshǖ: 同文同種), though it was geared to subordinating them to Japan's interests in a paternalistic manner. Aspiring to be accepted as a world actor with similar status to the traditional Western powers, Japan envisaged an Asian Monroe Doctrine, where Japan's proper sphere of geostrategic interests in Asia would be recognized. Some years earlier, Japan secured both British and French support for its claims to inherit rights that Germany had exercised both in China and in the Pacific Ocean north of the Equator. American policy experts, unaware of these secret agreements, nonetheless suggested that Japan had adopted a Prussian model that would imperil China's own search for autonomy, and these considerations influenced Wilson.

Nonetheless Japan emerged from the Treaty with territorial gains, including the Kiautschou Bay Leased Territory and all the territories of German New Guinea north of the Equator, forming the South Seas Mandate.

== Implementation ==
=== Reparations ===
On 5 May 1921, the reparation Commission established the London Schedule of Payments and a final reparation sum of 132 billion gold marks to be demanded of all the Central Powers. This was the public assessment of what the Central Powers combined could pay, and was also a compromise among Belgian, British, and French demands and assessments. Furthermore, the Commission recognized that the Central Powers could pay little and that the burden would fall upon Germany. As a result, the sum was split into different categories, of which Germany was only required to pay 50 billion gold marks (US$12.5 billion); this being the genuine assessment of the commission on what Germany could pay, and allowed the Allied powers to save face with the public by presenting a higher figure. Furthermore, payments made between 1919 and 1921 of roughly 8 billion marks, most of it credit for state assets (e.g., German state railways in the Danzig corridor) transferred to Allied countries were taken into account reducing the sum to 41 billion gold marks.

In order to meet this sum, Germany could pay in cash or kind: coal, timber, chemical dyes, pharmaceuticals, livestock, agricultural machines, construction materials, and factory machinery. Germany's assistance with the restoration of the university library of Leuven, which was destroyed by the Germans on 25 August 1914, was also credited towards the sum. Territorial changes imposed by the treaty were also factored in. The payment schedule required US$250 million within twenty-five days and then US$500 million annually, plus 26 per cent of the value of German exports. The German Government was to issue bonds at five per cent interest and set up a sinking fund of one per cent to support the payment of reparations.

=== Territorial changes ===
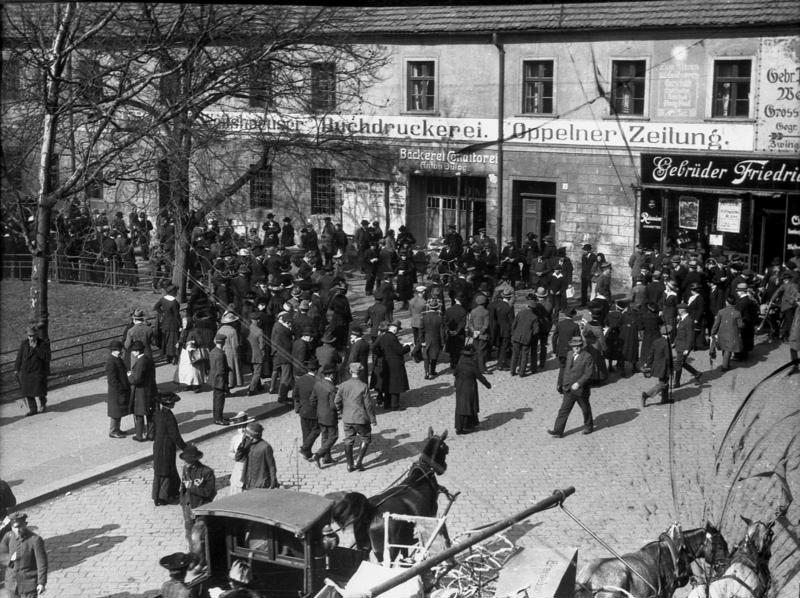
A crowd awaits the plebiscite results in Oppeln

In February and March 1920, the Schleswig Plebiscites were held. The people of Schleswig were presented with only two choices: Danish or German sovereignty. The northern Danish-speaking area voted for Denmark while the southern German-speaking area voted for Germany, resulting in the province being partitioned. The East Prussia plebiscite was held on 11 July 1920. There was a 90% turn out with 99.3% of the population wishing to remain with Germany. Further plebiscites were held in Eupen-Malmedy and Neutral Moresnet. On 20 September 1920, the League of Nations allotted these territories to Belgium. These latter plebiscites were followed by a boundary commission in 1922, followed by the new Belgian-German border being recognized by the German Government on 15 December 1923. The transfer of the Hultschin area, of Silesia, to Czechoslovakia was completed on 3 February 1921.

Following the implementation of the treaty, Upper Silesia was initially governed by Britain, France, and Italy. Between 1919 and 1921, three major outbreaks of violence took place between German and Polish civilians, resulting in German and Polish military forces also becoming involved. In March 1921, the Inter-Allied Commission held the Upper Silesia plebiscite, which was peaceful despite the previous violence. The plebiscite resulted in c. 60 per cent of the population voting for the province to remain part of Germany. Following the vote, the League of Nations debated the future of the province. In 1922, Upper Silesia was partitioned: Oppeln, in the north-west, remained with Germany while Silesia Province, in the south-east, was transferred to Poland.

Memel remained under the authority of the League of Nations, with a French Armed Forces garrison, until January 1923. On 9 January 1923, the Lithuanian Army invaded the territory during the Klaipėda Revolt. The French garrison withdrew, and in February the Allies agreed to attach Memel as an "autonomous territory" to Lithuania. On 8 May 1924, after negotiations between the Lithuanian Government and the Conference of Ambassadors and action by the League of Nations, the annexation of Memel was ratified. Lithuania accepted the Memel Statute, a power-sharing arrangement to protect non-Lithuanians in the territory and its autonomous status while responsibility for the territory remained with the great powers. The League of Nations mediated between the Germans and Lithuanians on a local level, helping the power-sharing arrangement last until 1939.

On 13 January 1935, 15 years after the Saar Basin had been placed under the protection of the League of Nations, a plebiscite was held to determine the future of the area. 528,105 votes were cast, with 477,119 votes (90 per cent of the ballot) in favour of union with Germany; 46,613 votes were cast for the status quo, and 2,124 votes for union with France. The region returned to German sovereignty on 1 March 1935. When the result was announced 4,100 people, including 800 refugees from Germany fled to France.

=== Rhineland occupation ===
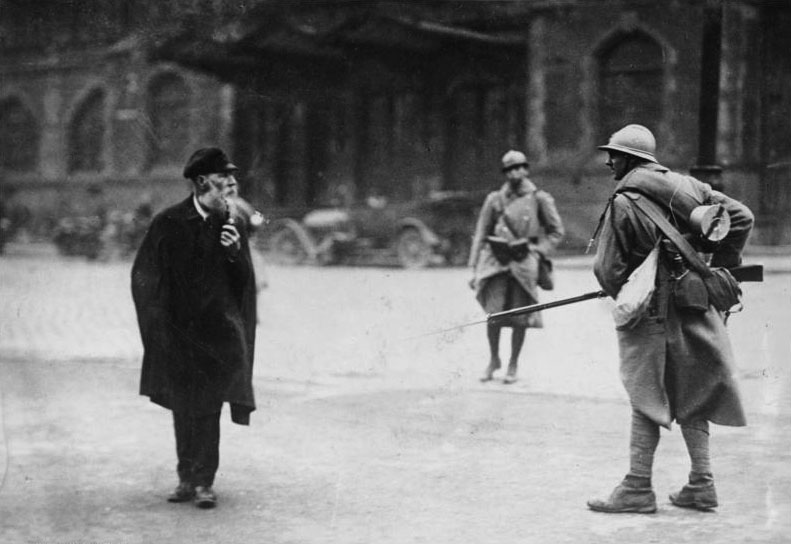
French soldiers in the Ruhr, which resulted in the American withdrawal from the Rhineland

In late 1918, American, Belgian, British, and French troops entered the Rhineland to enforce the armistice. Before the treaty, the occupation force stood at roughly 740,000 men. Following the signing of the peace treaty, the numbers drastically decreased and by 1926 the occupation force numbered only 76,000 men. As part of the 1929 negotiations that would become the Young Plan, Gustav Stresemann, and Aristide Briand negotiated the early withdrawal of Allied forces from the Rhineland. On 30 June 1930, after speeches and the lowering of flags, the last troops of the Anglo-French-Belgian occupation force withdrew from Germany.

Belgium maintained an occupation force of roughly 10,000 troops throughout the initial years. This figure fell to 7,102 by 1926, and continued to fall as a result of diplomatic developments.

The British Second Army, with some 275,000 veteran soldiers, entered Germany in late 1918. In March 1919, this force became the British Army of the Rhine (BAOR). The total number of troops committed to the occupation rapidly dwindled as veteran soldiers were demobilized, and were replaced by inexperienced men who had finished basic training following the cessation of hostilities. By 1920, the BAOR consisted of only 40,594 men and the following year had been further reduced to 12,421. The size of the BAOR fluctuated over the following years, but never rose above 9,000 men. The British did not adhere to all obligated territorial withdrawals as dictated by Versailles, on account of Germany not meeting her own treaty obligations. A complete withdrawal was considered, but rejected in order to maintain a presence to continue acting as a check on French ambitions and prevent the establishment of an autonomous Rhineland Republic.

The French Army of the Rhine was initially 250,000 men strong, including at a peak 40,000 African colonial troops (Troupes coloniales). By 1923, the French occupation force had decreased to roughly 130,000 men, including 27,126 African troops. The troop numbers peaked again at 250,000 during the occupation of the Ruhr, before decreasing to 60,000 men by 1926. Germans viewed the use of French colonial troops as a deliberate act of humiliation, and used their presence to create a propaganda campaign dubbed the Black Shame. This campaign lasted throughout the 1920s and 30s, although peaked in 1920 and 1921. For example, a 1921 German Government memo detailed 300 acts of violence from colonial troops, which included 65 murders and 170 sexual offenses. Historical consensus is that the charges were exaggerated for political and propaganda purposes, and that the colonial troops behaved far better than their white counterparts. An estimated 500–800 Rhineland Bastards were born as a result of fraternization between colonial troops and German women, and who would later be persecuted.

The United States Third Army entered Germany with 200,000 men. In June 1919, the Third Army demobilized and by 1920 the US occupation force had been reduced to 15,000 men. Wilson further reduced the garrison to 6,500 men, before Warren G. Harding's inauguration in 1921. On 7 January 1923, after the Franco–Belgian occupation of the Ruhr, the US Senate legislated the withdrawal of the remaining force. On 24 January, the American garrison started their withdrawal from the Rhineland, with the final troops leaving in early February.

== Violations ==
=== Reparations ===
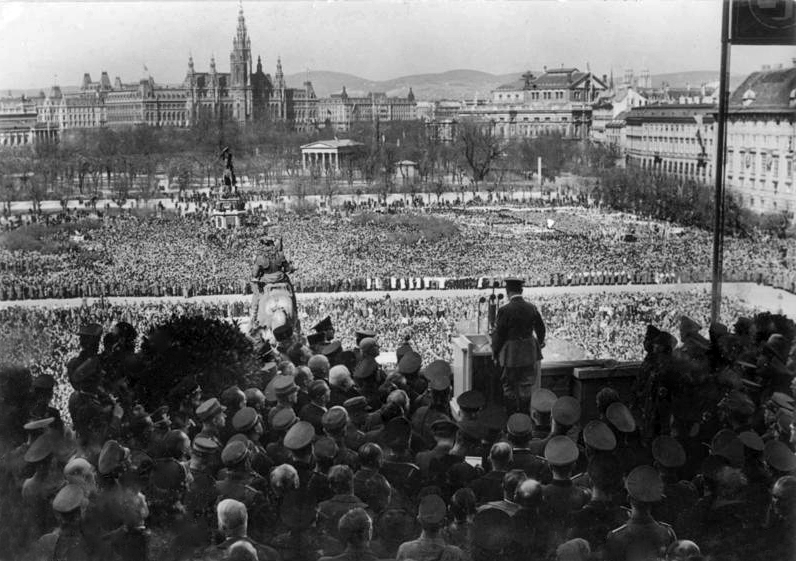
Adolf Hitler announcing the Anschluß in violation of Art. 80 on the Heldenplatz, Vienna, 15 March 1938

In June 1921 Germany made the first cash payment of 1 billion gold marks due under the London Schedule of Payments. However, this was the only full payment of cash made under the unamended schedule, and from then until the Dawes plan began operation in late 1924 only small cash payments were made. Whilst in-kind payments of goods such as coal and timber were made throughout 1922, these were never paid in full, and in December 1922 Germany was declared in default of timber deliveries by a 3-to-1 vote of the Reparations Commission, the British representative casting the sole opposing vote. On 9 January of the following year, after Germany had defaulted either partially or wholly on coal deliveries for the thirty-fourth time in thirty-six months, the Reparations Commission also declared Germany in default of coal reparations and authorised the occupation of the Ruhr coalfields in order to secure the deliveries, again with the British representative casting the sole opposing vote and all other votes being in favour.

In a move that was condemned by the British, French, Belgian, and Italian engineers supported by French and Belgian forces occupied the Ruhr area on 11 January 1923. The German government answered with "passive resistance", which meant that coal miners and railway workers refused to obey any instructions by the occupation forces. Production and transportation came to a standstill, but the financial consequences, including the payment in paper currency of striking workers by the German government, contributed to German hyperinflation in the period from late 1921 to 1924. Consequently, passive resistance was called off in late 1923. The end of passive resistance in the Ruhr allowed Germany to undertake a currency reform and to negotiate the Dawes Plan, which led to the withdrawal of French and Belgian troops from the Ruhr Area in 1925. The agreement of the Dawes plan in late 1924 also led to a resumption of reparations payments in hard cash and gold. Total receipts from the Ruhr occupation summed to 900 million gold marks.

From the agreement of the Dawes Plan in late 1924 until July 1931 when payment was suspended under a proposal by Herbert Hoover as a result of the Great Depression, reparations payments were made regularly and on time both in cash and in-kind, though always slightly less than was required under the plan. The one year suspension of payments under the Hoover Moratorium was to be converted into a permanent moratorium according to a proposal created at the Lausanne Conference of 1932, however the agreement was never ratified. The government of Adolf Hitler declared all further payments cancelled in 1933, and no further reparations payments were made until after the defeat of Nazi Germany in the Second World War. Germany finally paid off its debts under the Versailles treaty, which had been reduced by 50% at the 1953 London Debt Conference, in 2010.

=== Military ===
In 1920, the head of the Reichswehr Hans von Seeckt clandestinely re-established the General Staff, by expanding the Truppenamt (Troop Office); purportedly a human resources section of the army. In March, 18,000 German troops entered the Rhineland under the guise of attempting to quell possible unrest by the Communist Party of Germany and in doing so violated the demilitarized zone. In response, French troops advanced farther into Germany until the German troops withdrew.

German officials conspired systematically to evade the clauses of the treaty, by failing to meet disarmament deadlines, refusing Allied officials access to military facilities, and maintaining and hiding weapon production. As the treaty did not ban German companies from producing war material outside of Germany, companies moved to the Netherlands, Switzerland, and Sweden. Bofors was bought by Krupp, and in 1921 German troops were sent to Sweden to test weapons. The establishment of diplomatic ties with the Soviet Union, via the Genoa Conference and Treaty of Rapallo, was also used to circumvent the Treaty of Versailles. Publicly, these diplomatic exchanges were largely in regards to trade and future economic cooperation. But secret military clauses were included that allowed for Germany to develop weapons inside the Soviet Union. Furthermore, it allowed for Germany to establish three training areas for aviation, chemical and tank warfare. In 1923, the British newspaper The Times made several claims about the state of the German Armed Forces: that it had equipment for 800,000 men, was transferring army staff to civilian positions in order to obscure their real duties, and warned of the militarization of the German police force by the exploitation of the Krümper system. (Note: On 8 March 1936, 22,700 armed policemen were incorporated into the army in 21 infantry battalions (Bell 1997, p. 234).)

The Weimar Government also funded domestic rearmament programs, which were covertly funded with the money camouflaged in "X-budgets", worth up to an additional 10% of the disclosed military budget. By 1925, German companies had begun to design tanks and modern artillery. During the year, over half of Chinese arms imports were German and worth 13 million Reichsmarks. In January 1927, following the withdrawal of the Allied disarmament committee, Krupps ramped up production of armor plate and artillery. (Note: Gustav Krupp later claimed he had duped the Allies throughout the 1920s and prepared the German military for the future (Shuster 2006, p. 116).) Production increased so that by 1937, military exports had increased to 82,788,604 Reichsmarks. Production was not the only violation: "Volunteers" were rapidly passed through the army to make a pool of trained reserves, and paramilitary organizations were encouraged with the illegally militarized police. Non-commissioned officers (NCOs) were not limited by the treaty, thus this loophole was exploited and as such the number of NCOs were vastly in excess to the number needed by the Reichswehr.

In December 1931, the Reichswehr finalized a second rearmament plan that called for 480 million Reichsmarks to be spent over the following five years: this program sought to provide Germany the capability of creating and supplying a defensive force of 21 divisions supported by aircraft, artillery, and tanks. This coincided with a 1 billion Reichsmark programme that planned for additional industrial infrastructure that would be able to permanently maintain this force. As these programs did not require an expansion of the military, they were nominally legal. On 7 November 1932, the Reich Minister of Defense Kurt von Schleicher authorized the illegal Umbau Plan for a standing army of 21 divisions based on 147,000 professional soldiers and a large militia. Later in the year at the World Disarmament Conference, Germany withdrew to force France and Britain to accept German equality of status. London attempted to get Germany to return with the promise of all nations maintaining an equality in armaments and security. The British later proposed and agreed to an increase in the Reichswehr to 200,000 men, and for Germany to have an air force half the size of the French. It was also negotiated for the French Army to be reduced.

In October 1933, following the rise of Adolf Hitler and the founding of the Nazi regime, Germany withdrew from the League of Nations and the World Disarmament Conference. In March 1935, Germany reintroduced conscription followed by an open rearmament programme and the official unveiling of the Luftwaffe (air force), and signed the Anglo-German Naval Agreement that allowed a surface fleet 35% of the size of the Royal Navy. The resulting rearmament programmes were allotted 35 billion Reichsmarks over an eight-year period.

=== Territorial ===
On 7 March 1936, German troops entered and remilitarized the Rhineland. On 12 March 1938, following German pressure to the collapse of the Austrian Government, German troops crossed into Austria and the following day Hitler announced the Anschluss: the annexation of Austria by Germany. The following year, on 23 March 1939, Germany annexed Memel from Lithuania.

=== War criminals ===
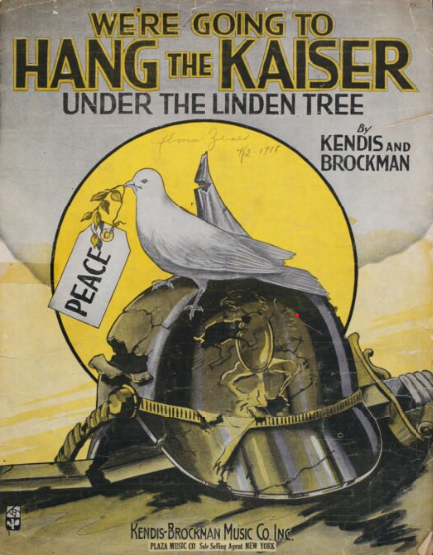
Front cover of a book of sheet music entitled "We're Going To Hang The Kaiser Under The Linden Tree"

Despite "hang the Kaiser" being a popular slogan of the time, particularly in Britain, the proposed trial of the Kaiser under Article 227 of the Versailles treaty never took place. Defying popular British anger at the Kaiser, and the fact that putting the Kaiser on trial was originally a British proposal, Lloyd George refused to support French calls for the Kaiser to be extradited from the Netherlands where he was living in exile. The Dutch authorities refused extradition, and the former Kaiser died there in 1941.

Article 228 allowed for the extradition of German war criminals to stand trial before Allied tribunals. Originally a list of as many of 20,000 alleged criminals was prepared by the Allies, however this was later reduced. Following the ratification of the treaty in January 1920, the Allies submitted a request that 890 (or 895) alleged war criminals be extradited for trial. France and Belgium each requested the extradition of 334 individuals including von Hindenburg and Ludendorff for the damages they had inflicted on Belgium and the mass deportations they had overseen from both France and Belgium. Britain submitted a list of 94 names, including von Tirpitz for the sinkings of civilian shipping by German U-boats. Italy's request included 29 names divided between those accused of mistreating prisoners of war and those responsible for U-Boat sinkings. Romania requested the extradition of 41 individuals including von Mackensen. Poland requested 51 people be extradited, and Yugoslavia (successor to wartime Serbia) four. Germany refused extradition, however, claiming that carrying out such a request to extradite people widely regarded as heroes in Germany would likely result in the fall of the government, but made a counter-offer of holding trials at Leipzig, an offer that was ultimately accepted by the Allies.

After subsequent negotiation, the list of alleged war criminals submitted by the Allies for trial at Leipzig was reduced to 45, however, this ultimately also ended up being too many for the German authorities, and in the end only 12 officers were put on trial – six from the British list, five from the French one, and one from the Belgian list. The British list included only low-level officers and enlisted men, including a prison-guard accused of beating prisoners of war and two U-Boat commanders who sank hospital ships (the Dover Castle and the Llandovery Castle). In contrast the French list were all high-ranking officials, including Lieutenant-General Karl Stenger, who was accused of massacring French prisoners of war. The Belgian case involved a man accused of mistreating and imprisoning Belgian children. However, when the Germans announced that the trial would be under German law, with the German prosecutor being able to exercise prosecutorial discretion, the French and Belgians withdrew from the process in protest. Only half of the cases led to conviction, with superior orders being allowed as a defence in the Dover Castle case, and in mitigation in the Llandovery Castle case where the officer responsible had massacred seamen in lifeboats. All but one of the people put forward by the French were acquitted, including Karl Stenger, who was showered with flowers by German spectators. The Belgian case was also acquitted.

The Commission of Allied Jurists responded to these proceedings on 22 January 1922 by declaring that the Leipzig court had failed to carry out its mandate by failing to convict accused who should have been convicted, and by showing excessive leniency even where people had been convicted. The Allied Jurists recommended that extradition of war criminals be requested under Article 228. However, no further extradition request was made, though trials were held in France and Belgium of German war criminals in absentia.

== Historical assessments ==
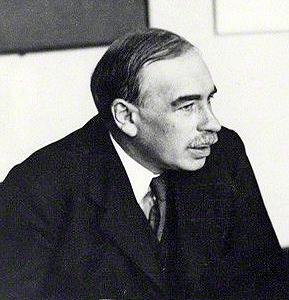
John Maynard Keynes, the principal representative of the British Treasury, denounced the Treaty as a "Carthaginian peace".

Historians are split on the impact of the treaty. Some saw it as a good solution in a difficult time, others saw it as a disastrous measure that would anger the Germans to seek revenge. The actual impact of the treaty is also disputed.

In his book The Economic Consequences of the Peace (published 1919), John Maynard Keynes referred to the Treaty of Versailles as a "Carthaginian peace", a misguided attempt to destroy Germany on behalf of French revanchism, rather than to follow the fairer principles for a lasting peace set out in Wilson's Fourteen Points, which Germany had accepted at the armistice. He stated: "I believe that the campaign for securing out of Germany the general costs of the war was one of the most serious acts of political unwisdom for which our statesmen have ever been responsible." Keynes had been the principal representative of the British Treasury at the Paris Peace Conference, and used in his passionate book arguments that he and others (including some US officials) had used at Paris. He believed the sums being asked of Germany in reparations were many times more than it was possible for Germany to pay, and that these would produce drastic instability. (Note: "The Treaty includes no provisions for the economic rehabilitation of Europe—nothing to make the defeated Central Empires into good neighbours, nothing to stabilize the new States of Europe, nothing to reclaim Russia; nor does it promote in any way a compact of economic solidarity amongst the Allies themselves; no arrangement was reached at Paris for restoring the disordered finances of France and Italy, or to adjust the systems of the Old World and the New. The Council of Four paid no attention to these issues, being preoccupied with others—Clemenceau to crush the economic life of his enemy, Lloyd George to do a deal and bring home something which would pass muster for a week, the President to do nothing that was not just and right. It is an extraordinary fact that the fundamental economic problems of a Europe starving and disintegrating before their eyes, was the one question in which it was impossible to arouse the interest of the Four. Reparation was their main excursion into the economic field, and they settled it as a problem of theology, of polities, of electoral chicane, from every point of view except that of the economic future of the States whose destiny they were handling." (Keynes 1919))

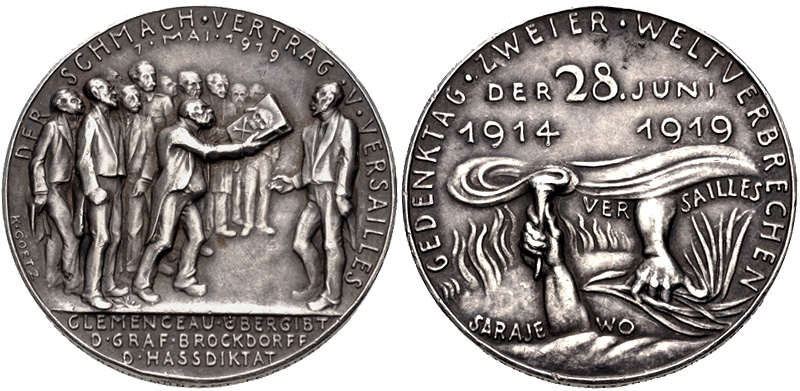
Commemorative medal issued in 1929 in Germany on the occasion of the 10th anniversary of the Treaty of Versailles. The obverse depicts Georges Clemenceau presenting a bound treaty, decorated with skull and crossbones to Ulrich von Brockdorff-Rantzau. Other members of the Conference are standing behind Clemenceau, including Lloyd-George, Wilson and Orlando.

French economist Étienne Mantoux disputed that analysis. During the 1940s, Mantoux wrote a posthumously published book titled The Carthaginian Peace, or the Economic Consequences of Mr. Keynes in an attempt to rebut Keynes' claims. More recently economists have argued that the restriction of Germany to a small army saved it so much money it could afford the reparations payments.

It has been argued—for instance by historian Gerhard Weinberg in his book A World at Arms (1994)—that the treaty was in fact quite advantageous to Germany. The Bismarckian Reich was maintained as a political unit instead of being broken up, and Germany largely escaped post-war military occupation (in contrast to the situation following World War II). In a 1995 essay, Weinberg noted that with the disappearance of Austria-Hungary and with Russia withdrawn from Europe, that Germany was now the dominant power in Eastern Europe.

The British military historian Correlli Barnett argued that the Treaty of Versailles was "extremely lenient in comparison with the peace terms that Germany herself, when she was expecting to win the war, had had in mind to impose on the Allies". Furthermore, he said, it was "hardly a slap on the wrist" when contrasted with the Treaty of Brest-Litovsk that Germany had imposed on a defeated Russian SFSR in March 1918, which had taken away a third of Russia's population, one-half of Russia's industrial undertakings and nine-tenths of Russia's coal mines, coupled with an indemnity of six billion marks. Eventually, even under the "cruel" terms of the Treaty of Versailles, Germany's economy had been restored to its pre-war status.

Barnett also argues that, in strategic terms, Germany was in fact in a superior position following the Treaty than she had been in 1914. Germany's eastern frontiers faced Russia and Austria, who had both in the past balanced German power. Barnett asserts that its post-war eastern borders were safer, because the former Austrian Empire fractured after the war into smaller, weaker states, Russia was wracked by revolution and civil war, and the newly restored Poland was no match for even a defeated Germany. In the West, Germany was balanced only by France and Belgium, both of which were smaller in population and less economically vibrant than Germany. Barnett concludes by saying that instead of weakening Germany, the treaty "much enhanced" German power. Britain and France should have (according to Barnett) "divided and permanently weakened" Germany by undoing Bismarck's work and partitioning Germany into smaller, weaker states so it could never have disrupted the peace of Europe again. By failing to do this and therefore not solving the problem of German power and restoring the equilibrium of Europe, Britain "had failed in her main purpose in taking part in the Great War".

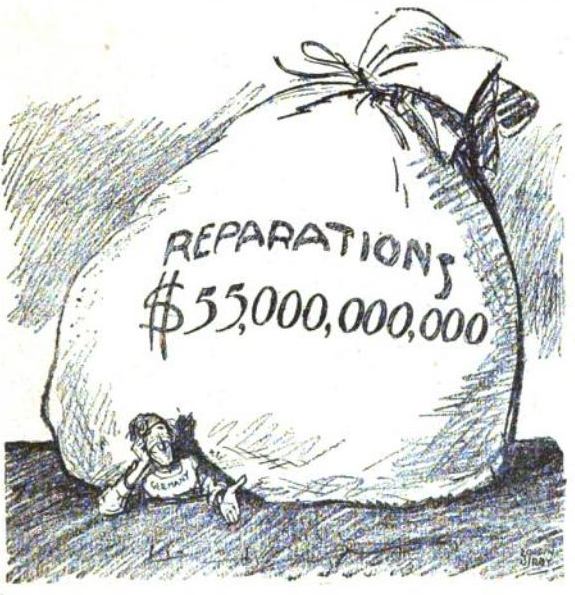
American political cartoon depicting the contemporary view of German reparations, 1921

The British historian of modern Germany Richard J. Evans wrote that during the war the German right was committed to an annexationist program which aimed at Germany annexing most of Europe and Africa. Consequently, any peace treaty that did not leave Germany as the conqueror would be unacceptable to them. Short of allowing Germany to keep all the conquests of the Treaty of Brest-Litovsk, Evans argued that there was nothing that could have been done to persuade the German right to accept Versailles. Evans further noted that the parties of the Weimar Coalition, namely the Social Democratic Party of Germany (SPD), the social liberal German Democratic Party (DDP) and the Christian democratic Centre Party, were all equally opposed to Versailles, and it is false to say as some historians have that opposition to Versailles also equalled opposition to the Weimar Republic. Finally, Evans argued that it is untrue that Versailles caused the premature end of the Republic, instead contending that it was the Great Depression of the early 1930s that put an end to German democracy. He also argued that Versailles was not the "main cause" of National Socialism and the German economy was "only marginally influenced by the impact of reparations".

Ewa Thompson points out that the treaty allowed numerous nations in Central and Eastern Europe to liberate themselves from oppressive German rule, a fact that is often neglected by Western historiography, more interested in understanding the German point of view. In nations that found themselves free as the result of the treaty—such as Poles or Czechs—it is seen as a symbol of recognition of wrongs committed against small nations by their much larger aggressive neighbours.

Resentment caused by the treaty sowed fertile psychological ground for the eventual rise of the Nazi Party, but the German-born Australian historian Jürgen Tampke argued that it was "a perfidious distortion of history" to argue that the terms prevented the growth of democracy in Germany and aided the growth of the Nazi Party; saying that its terms were not as punitive as often held and that German hyper-inflation in the 1920s was partly a deliberate policy to minimise the cost of reparations. As an example of the arguments against the Versaillerdiktat he quotes Elizabeth Wiskemann who heard two officer's widows in Wiesbaden complaining that "with their stocks of linen depleted they had to have their linen washed once a fortnight (every two weeks) instead of once a month!"

The German historian Detlev Peukert wrote that Versailles was far from the impossible peace that most Germans claimed it was during the interwar period, and though not without flaws was actually quite reasonable to Germany. Rather, Peukert argued that it was widely believed in Germany that Versailles was a totally unreasonable treaty, and it was this "perception" rather than the "reality" of the Versailles treaty that mattered. Peukert noted that because of the "millenarian hopes" created in Germany during World War I when for a time it appeared that Germany was on the verge of conquering all of Europe, any peace treaty the Allies of World War I imposed on the defeated German Reich were bound to create a nationalist backlash, and there was nothing the Allies could have done to avoid that backlash. Having noted that much, Peukert commented that the policy of rapprochement with the Western powers that Gustav Stresemann carried out between 1923 and 1929 were constructive policies that might have allowed Germany to play a more positive role in Europe, and that it was not true that German democracy was doomed to die in 1919 because of Versailles. Finally, Peukert argued that it was the Great Depression and the turn to a nationalist policy of autarky within Germany at the same time that finished off the Weimar Republic, not the Treaty of Versailles.

French historian Raymond Cartier states that millions of ethnic Germans in the Sudetenland and in Posen-West Prussia were placed under foreign rule in a hostile environment, where harassment and violation of rights by authorities are documented. (Note: Raymond Cartier, La Seconde Guerre mondiale, Paris, Larousse Paris Match, 1965, quoted in Groppe 2004.) Cartier asserts that, out of 1,058,000 Germans in Posen-West Prussia in 1921, 758,867 fled their homelands within five years due to Polish harassment. These sharpening ethnic conflicts would lead to public demands to reattach the annexed territory in 1938 and become a pretext for Hitler's annexations of Czechoslovakia and parts of Poland.

According to David Stevenson, since the opening of French archives, most commentators have remarked on French restraint and reasonableness at the conference, though Stevenson notes that "[t]he jury is still out", and that "there have been signs that the pendulum of judgement is swinging back the other way."

=== Territorial changes ===
Map of territorial changes in Europe after World War I (as of 1923)

The Treaty of Versailles resulted in the creation of several thousand miles of new boundaries, with maps playing a central role in the negotiations at Paris. The plebiscites initiated due to the treaty have drawn much comment. Historian Robert Peckham wrote that the issue of Schleswig "was premised on a gross simplification of the region's history. ... Versailles ignored any possibility of there being a third way: the kind of compact represented by the Swiss Federation; a bilingual or even trilingual Schleswig-Holsteinian state" or other options such as "a Schleswigian state in a loose confederation with Denmark or Germany, or an autonomous region under the protection of the League of Nations." In regard to the East Prussia plebiscite, historian Richard Blanke wrote that "no other contested ethnic group has ever, under un-coerced conditions, issued so one-sided a statement of its national preference". Richard Debo wrote "both Berlin and Warsaw believed the Soviet invasion of Poland had influenced the East Prussian plebiscites. Poland appeared so close to collapse that even Polish voters had cast their ballots for Germany".

In regard to the Silesian plebiscite, Blanke observed "given that the electorate was at least 60% Polish-speaking, this means that about one 'Pole' in three voted for Germany" and "most Polish observers and historians" have concluded that the outcome of the plebiscite was due to "unfair German advantages of incumbency and socio-economic position". Blanke alleged "coercion of various kinds even in the face of an allied occupation regime" occurred, and that Germany granted votes to those "who had been born in Upper Silesia but no longer resided there". Blanke concluded that despite these protests "there is plenty of other evidence, including Reichstag election results both before and after 1921 and the large-scale emigration of Polish-speaking Upper Silesians to Germany after 1945, that their identification with Germany in 1921 was neither exceptional nor temporary" and "here was a large population of Germans and Poles—not coincidentally, of the same Catholic religion—that not only shared the same living space but also came in many cases to see themselves as members of the same national community". Prince Eustachy Sapieha, the Polish Minister of Foreign Affairs, alleged that Soviet Russia "appeared to be intentionally delaying negotiations" to end the Polish-Soviet War "with the object of influencing the Upper Silesian plebiscite". Once the region was partitioned, both "Germany and Poland attempted to 'cleanse' their shares of Upper Silesia" via oppression resulting in Germans migrating to Germany and Poles migrating to Poland. Despite the oppression and migration, Opole Silesia "remained ethnically mixed."

Frank Russell wrote that, in regard to the Saar plebiscite, the inhabitants "were not terrorized at the polls" and the "totalitarian [Nazi] German regime was not distasteful to most of the Saar inhabitants and that they preferred it even to an efficient, economical, and benevolent international rule." When the outcome of the vote became known, 4,100 (including 800 refugees who had previously fled Germany) residents fled over the border into France.

=== Military terms and violations ===
During the formulation of the treaty, the British wanted Germany to abolish conscription but be allowed to maintain a volunteer Army. The French wanted Germany to maintain a conscript army of up to 200,000 men in order to justify their own maintenance of a similar force. Thus the treaty's allowance of 100,000 volunteers was a compromise between the British and French positions. Germany, on the other hand, saw the terms as leaving them defenseless against any potential enemy. Bernadotte Everly Schmitt wrote that "there is no reason to believe that the Allied governments were insincere when they stated at the beginning of Part V of the Treaty ... that in order to facilitate a general reduction of the armament of all nations, Germany was to be required to disarm first." A lack of American ratification of the treaty or joining the League of Nations left France unwilling to disarm, which resulted in a German desire to rearm. Schmitt argued "had the four Allies remained united, they could have forced Germany really to disarm, and the German will and capacity to resist other provisions of the treaty would have correspondingly diminished."

Max Hantke and Mark Spoerer wrote "military and economic historians [have] found that the German military only insignificantly exceeded the limits" of the treaty before 1933. Adam Tooze concurred, and wrote "To put this in perspective, annual military spending by the Weimar Republic was counted not in the billions but in the hundreds of millions of Reichsmarks"; for example, the Weimar Republic's 1931 program of 480 million Reichsmarks over five years compared to the Nazi Government's 1933 plan to spend 4.4 billion Reichsmarks per year. P. M. H. Bell argued that the British Government was aware of later Weimar rearming, and lent public respectability to the German efforts by not opposing them, an opinion shared by Churchill. Norman Davies wrote that "a curious oversight" of the military restrictions were that they "did not include rockets in its list of prohibited weapons", which allowed Wernher von Braun an area to research which eventually resulting in "his break [that] came in 1943" leading to the development of the V-2 rocket.

=== Rise of the Nazis ===
The Treaty created much resentment in Germany, which was exploited by Adolf Hitler in his rise to power at the helm of Nazi Germany. Central to this was belief in the stab-in-the-back myth, which held that the German army had not lost the war and had been betrayed by the Weimar Republic, who negotiated an unnecessary surrender. The Great Depression exacerbated the issue and led to a collapse of the German economy. Though the treaty may not have caused the crash, it was a convenient scapegoat. Germans viewed the treaty as a humiliation and eagerly listened to Hitler's oratory which blamed the treaty for Germany's ills. Hitler promised to reverse the depredations of the Allied powers and recover Germany's lost territory and pride, which has led to the treaty being cited as a cause of World War II.

Hermann Göring first met Adolf Hitler at a speech which Hitler gave at a rally against French demands for the extradition of alleged German war criminals under the Versailles treaty.

== See also ==
- Aftermath of World War I
- Little Treaty of Versailles
- Minority Treaties
- Septemberprogramm

== Sources ==
- Albrecht-Carrie, Rene (1940). "Versailles Twenty Years After". Political Science Quarterly. 55 (1): 1–24. doi:10.2307/2143772. ISSN 0032-3195. JSTOR 2143772.
- Altic, Mirela (2016). "The Peace Treaty of Versailles: The Role of Maps in Reshaping the Balkans in the Aftermath of WWI". In Liebenberg, Elri; Demhardt, Imre & Vervust, Soetkin (eds.). History of Military Cartography. Cham: Springer. pp. 179–198. ISBN 978-3-319-25244-5.
- Appiah, Anthony & Gates, Henry Louis, eds. (2005). Africana: The Encyclopedia of the African and African American Experience (2nd ed.). Oxford University Press. p. 781. ISBN 978-0-19-517055-9.
- Arnander, Christopher & Wood, Frances (2016). "Introduction". The Betrayed Ally, China in the Great War. Pen and Sword. ISBN 978-1-4738-7501-2.
- Bailey, Thomas A. (1945). "Woodrow Wilson and the Great Betrayal". New York: The Macmillan Company – via Internet Archive.
- Baker, Anni (2004). American Soldiers Overseas: The Global Military Presence. Perspectives on the Twentieth Century (First ed.). Praeger. ISBN 978-0-275-97354-4 – via Internet Archive.
- Bane, S.L. (1942). The Blockade of Germany after the Armistice. Stanford University Press. p. 791.
- Barnes, Alexander & Ebertowski, James (April 2011). "Peace in peril in May-June 1919". Defense Transportation Journal. 67 (2): 12–26. JSTOR 44123331.
- Barnett, Correlli (1986). The Collapse of British Power. Prometheus Books. ISBN 978-039103-439-6.
- Barnett, Correlli (2002). The Collapse of British Power. "Pride and Fall" sequence. London: Pan. p. 392. ISBN 978-0-330-49181-5.
- Bartov, Omer & Weitz, Eric D., eds. (2013). Shatterzone of Empires: Coexistence and Violence in the German, Habsburg, Russian and Ottoman Borderlands. Indiana University Press. ISBN 978-0-253-00635-6.
- Bassiouni, M. Cherif (January 2002). "World War I: The War to End All Wars and the Birth of a Handicapped International Criminal Justice System". Denver Journal of International Law and Policy. 30 (3): 244–291.
- Bell, P.M.H. (1997) [First published 1986]. The Origins of the Second World War in Europe (2nd ed.). Pearson. ISBN 978-058230-470-3 – via Internet Archive.
- Beller, Steven (2007). A Concise History of Austria. Cambridge Concise Histories. Cambridge University Press. ISBN 978-052147-886-1 – via Internet Archive.
- Benians, Ernest Alfred; Butler, James & Carrington, C. E., eds. (1959). Cambridge History of the British Empire Volume 3, The Empire Commonwealth 1870–1919 (volume 3). Cambridge University Press. ISBN 978-052104-512-4.
- Bessel, Richard (1993). Germany After the First World War. Oxford University Press, US. ISBN 978-019821-938-5.
- Blakemore, Erin (27 June 2019). "Germany's World War I Debt Was So Crushing It Took 92 Years to Pay Off". History. Archived from the original on 17 September 2021.
- Boemeke, Manfred F.; Feldman, Gerald D. & Glaser, Elisabeth, eds. (1998). Versailles: A Reassessment after 75 Years. Publications of the German Historical Institute. Cambridge University Press. ISBN 978-052162-132-8.
- Boyer, Paul S.; Clark, Clifford E.; Hawley, Sandra; Kett, Joseph F. & Rieser, Andrew (2009). The Enduring Vision: A History of the American People, Volume 2: From 1865. Cengage Learning. ISBN 978-054722-278-3.
- Brezina, Corona (2006). The Treaty of Versailles, 1919: A Primary Source Examination of the Treaty That Ended World War I. Primary Sources of American Treaties. Rosen Central. ISBN 978-140420-442-3 – via Internet Archive.
- Brüll, Christoph (8 October 2014). "Eupen-Malmedy". In Daniel, Ute; Gatrell, Peter; Janz, Oliver; Jones, Heather; Keene, Jennifer; Kramer, Alan & Nasson, Bill (eds.). 1914–1918 Online International Encyclopedia of the First World War. Berlin: Freie Universität Berlin. doi:10.15463/ie1418.10212.
- Bullivant, Keith; Giles, Geoffrey & Pape, Walter, eds. (1999). Germany and Eastern Europe: Cultural Identities and Cultural Differences. Yearbook of European Studies. Rodopi Bv Editions. ISBN 978-90-420-0688-1.
- Campbell, John (2010). Pistols at Dawn: Two Hundred Years of Political Rivalry from Pitt and Fox to Blair and Brown. London: Vintage. p. 181. ISBN 978-1-84595-091-0. OCLC 489636152 – via Internet Archive.
- "Clemenceau an Deutschland: "Die Stunde der Abrechnung ist da."" [Clemenceau to Germany: "The day of reckoning is here"]. Die Weimarer Republik: Deutschlands erste Demokratie (in German). Weimarer Republik e.V. n.d. Archived from the original on 18 May 2021.
- Collar, Peter (2012). The Propaganda War in the Rhineland: Weimar Germany, Race and Occupation after World War I. London: I.B. Tauris. p. 78. ISBN 978-1-84885-946-3.
- Cooper, John Milton (2011). Woodrow Wilson: A Biography. Vintage Books. pp. 422–424. ISBN 978-0-307-27790-9.
- Corrigan, Gordon (2011). The Second World War: A Military History. Thomas Dunne Books. ISBN 978-031-257709-4 – via Internet Archive.
- Davies, Norman (2007). Europe at War 1939-1945: No Simple Victory. Pan Books. ISBN 978-033035-212-3.
- Davis, Robert T., ed. (2010). U.S. Foreign Policy and National Security: Chronology and Index for the 20th Century. Vol. 1. Santa Barbara, California: Praeger Security International. p. 49. ISBN 978-0-313-38385-4.
- De Zayas, Alfred M. (1989). The Wehrmacht War Crimes Bureau, 1939-1945. University of Nebraska Press. p. 5. ISBN 0-8032-1680-7 – via Internet Archive.
- Debo, Richard K. (1992). Survival and Consolidation: The Foreign Policy of Soviet Russia, 1918–1921. Mcgill Queens University Press, First Edition. ISBN 978-0-7735-0828-6.
- "Die Finanzierung des Lebensmittels" [Paying for food imports]. Deutsche Allgemeine Zeitung (in German). 2 February 1919.
- Dreyer, June Teufel (2015). China's Political System. Routledge. p. 60. ISBN 978-1-317-34964-8.
- Duff, John B. (1968), "The Versailles Treaty and the Irish-Americans", The Journal of American History, 55 (3): 582–598, doi:10.2307/1891015, JSTOR 1891015
- Edmonds, J.E. (1987) [First published 1943]. The Occupation of the Rhineland 1918–29. HMSO. ISBN 978-0-11-290454-0.
- Evans, Richard J. (1989). In Hitler's Shadow: West German Historians and the Attempt to Escape from the Nazi Past (First ed.). Pantheon Books. ISBN 978-067972-348-6 – via Internet Archive.
- Ferguson, Niall (1998). The Pity of War: Explaining World War I. Allen Lane. ISBN 978-0-713-99246-5.
- Fischer, Klaus P. (1995). Nazi Germany: A New History. Constable. p. 408. ISBN 978-0-09-474910-8.
- Folly, Martin & Palmer, Niall (2010). Historical Dictionary of U.S. Diplomacy from World War I through World War II. Historical Dictionaries of Diplomacy and Foreign Relations. Scarecrow Press. ISBN 978-081085-606-6.
- Frucht, Richard, ed. (2004). Eastern Europe: An Introduction to the People, Lands, and Culture. ABC-CLIO. ISBN 978-157607-800-6 – via Internet Archive.
- Fuller, J.F.C. (1993). The Second World War, 1939–45 A Strategical And Tactical History. Da Capo Press. ISBN 978-0-306-80506-6.
- Geyer, Michael (1984). Deutsche Rüstungspolitik 1860 bis 1980 (in German). Frankfurt: Suhrkamp. ISBN 978-3-518-11246-5.
- Gilbert, Martin (1974). Taylor, AJP (ed.). History of World War 1. Octopus Books. p. 276. ISBN 0-7064-0398-3.
- "The Great War 1914 to 1918". The National Archives. Archived from the original on 14 December 2017.
- Grebler, Leo (1940). The Cost of the World War to Germany and Austria-Hungary. Yale University Press. p. 78.
- Groppe, Pater Lothar (28 August 2004). "Die "Jagd auf Deutsche" im Osten: Die Verfolgung begann nicht erst mit dem "Bromberger Blutsonntag" vor 50 Jahren". Preußische Allgemeine Zeitung (in German). Archived from the original on 29 July 2010. "'Von 1.058.000 Deutschen, die noch 1921 in Posen und Westpreußen lebten', ist bei Cartier zu lesen, 'waren bis 1926 unter polnischem Druck 758.867 abgewandert. Nach weiterer Drangsal wurde das volksdeutsche Bevölkerungselement vom Warschauer Innenministerium am 15. Juli 1939 auf weniger als 300.000 Menschen geschätzt.'"
- Haigh, Christopher, ed. (1990). The Cambridge Historical Encyclopedia of Great Britain and Ireland. Cambridge University Press. ISBN 978-052139-552-6 – via Internet Archive.
- Hantke, Max & Spoerer, Mark (2010), "The imposed gift of Versailles: the fiscal effects of restricting the size of Germany's armed forces, 1924–9" (PDF), Economic History Review, 63 (4): 849–864, doi:10.1111/j.1468-0289.2009.00512.x, S2CID 91180171, archived (PDF) from the original on 30 July 2022 – via MPRA: Munich Personal RePEc Archive
- Hardach, Gerd (1987). The First World War, 1914–1918. Penguin. ISBN 978-014022-679-9.
- "Harding Ends War; Signs Peace Decree at Senator's Home. Thirty Persons Witness Momentous Act in Frelinghuysen Living Room at Raritan". The New York Times. 3 July 1921. Archived from the original on 4 December 2013.
- Henig, Ruth (1995) [First published 1984]. Versailles and After: 1919–1933. London: Routledge. ISBN 978-0-415-12710-3 – via Internet Archive.
- Hirschfeld, Gerhard; Krumeich, Gerd (2013). Deutschland im Ersten Weltkrieg [Germany in the First World War] (in German) (Kindle ed.). Frankfurt: Fischer E-Books. ISBN 978-3-104-02489-9.
- Ingrao, Charles & Szabo, Franz A.J., eds. (2007). The Germans and the East. Purdue University Press. ISBN 978-155753-443-9.
- Jacobson, Jon (1972). Locarno Diplomacy: Germany and the West, 1925–1929. Princeton University Press. p. 135. ISBN 0-691-05190-9.
- Kawamura, Noriko (November 1997). "Wilsonian Idealism and Japanese Claims at the Paris Peace Conference". Pacific Historical Review. 66 (4): 503–526. doi:10.2307/3642235. JSTOR 3642235. S2CID 154956368.
- Kent, Alexander (2019). "A Picture and an Argument: Mapping for Peace with a Cartography of Hope". The Cartographic Journal. 56 (4): 275–279. Bibcode:2019CartJ..56..275K. doi:10.1080/00087041.2019.1694804.
- Keylor, William R. (1998). The Legacy of the Great War: Peacemaking, 1919. Boston and New York: Houghton Mifflin. p. 34. ISBN 0-669-41711-4. Archived from the original on 4 October 2013.
- Keynes, John Maynard (1919). "Europe after the treaty". The Economic Consequences of the Peace. pp. 226–251 – via Internet Archive.
- Keynes, John Maynard (1920). The Economic Consequences of the Peace. Harcourt Brace and Howe.
- Kim, Henry H. (2000). War crimes: a historical overview. Greenhaven Press. pp. 52–53. ISBN 0-7377-0171-4 – via Internet Archive.
- Kirby, William C. (1984). German and Republican China. Stanford University Press. ISBN 978-080471-209-5.
- Kramer, Alan (2008). Dynamic of Destruction: Culture and Mass Killing in the First World War. The Making of the Modern World. Penguin. ISBN 978-1-846-14013-6.
- Lauren, Paul Gordon (Summer 1978). "Human Rights in History: Diplomacy and Racial Equality at the Paris Peace Conference". Diplomatic History. 2 (3): 257–278. doi:10.1111/j.1467-7709.1978.tb00435.x. JSTOR 24909920. S2CID 154765654.
- Layne, Christopher (1996). "Kant or Cant: The Myth of the Democratic Peace". In Brown, Michael E.; Lynn-Jones, Sean M. & Miller, Steve E. (eds.). Debating the Democratic Peace. International Security Readers. MIT Press. ISBN 978-026252-213-7.
- "Lebensmittelabkommen in Brüssel" (in German). Das Bundesarchiv. Archived from the original on 11 July 2016.
- Lemkin, Raphael; Schabas, William A. & Power, Samantha (2008). Axis Rule in Occupied Europe: Laws of Occupation, Analysis of Government, Proposals for Redress. Foundations of the Laws of War. The Lawbook Exchange, Lrd 2 edition. ISBN 978-158477-901-8.
- Lentin, Antony (1985) [First published 1984]. Guilt at Versailles: Lloyd George and the Pre-history of Appeasement. Routledge. p. 84. ISBN 978-0-416-41130-0.
- Lentin, Antony (1992), "Trick or Treat? The Anglo-French Alliance, 1919", History Today, vol. 42, no. 12, pp. 28–32, ProQuest 1299048769
- Lentin, Antony (2012), "Germany: a New Carthage?", History Today, vol. 62, no. 1, pp. 20–27, archived from the original on 31 January 2015
- Liverman, Peter (1996). Does Conquest Pay?: The Exploitation of Occupied Industrial Societies. Princeton University Press. p. 92. ISBN 0-691-02986-5.
- Lovin, Clifford R. (1997). A School for Diplomats: the Paris Peace Conference of 1919. University Press of America. ISBN 978-076180-755-1.
- Marks, Sally (1978), "The Myths of Reparations", Central European History, 11 (3): 231–255, doi:10.1017/S0008938900018707, JSTOR 4545835, S2CID 144072556
- Marks, Sally (2013). "Mistakes and Myths: The Allies, Germany, and the Versailles Treaty, 1918–1921". Journal of Modern History. 85 (3): 632–659. doi:10.1086/670825. JSTOR 10.1086/670825. S2CID 154166326.
- Markwell, Donald (2006). John Maynard Keynes and International Relations: Economic Paths to War and Peace. Oxford University Press. ISBN 978-0-19-829236-4.
- Martel, Gordon, ed. (1999). Origins of the Second World War Reconsidered (2nd ed.). London: Routledge. ISBN 978-0-415-16325-5 – via Internet Archive.
- Martel, Gordon, ed. (2010). A Companion to Europe 1900–1945. Hoboken NJ: Wiley-Blackwell. ISBN 978-1-444-33840-9.
- Martin, Lawrence (2007) [First published 1924]. The Treaties of Peace, 1919–1923. The Lawbook Exchange. ISBN 978-158477-708-3.
- "May Fourth Movement". Encyclopaedia Britannica. 22 March 2024. Archived from the original on 29 April 2024.
- McDougall, Walter A (1978). France's Rhineland Policy, 1914–1924: The Last Bid for a Balance of Power in Europe. Princeton Legacy Library. Princeton University Press. p. 155. ISBN 978-0-691-05268-7.
- McDougall, Walter A. (1979), "Political Economy versus National Sovereignty: French Structures for German Economic Integration after Versailles", The Journal of Modern History, 51 (1): 4–23, doi:10.1086/241846, JSTOR 1877866, S2CID 144670397
- de Meneses, Filipe Ribeiro (n.d.). "Post-war Settlement (Portugal)". In Rollo, Maria Fernanda & Pires, Ana Paula (eds.). 1914–1918 Online. International Encyclopedia of the First World War. doi:10.15463/ie1418.10521.
- Mommsen, Hans & Foster, Elborg (1988). The Rise and Fall of Weimar Democracy. University of North Carolina Press. ISBN 978-0-8078-4721-3.
- Mowat, C. L., ed. (1968). Volume XII: The Shifting Balance of World Forces 1898-1945. The New Cambridge Modern History. Cambridge University Press. ISBN 978-052104-551-3.
- Mullins, Claude (1921). The Leipzeig trials; an account of the war criminals' trials and a study of German mentality (sic). H.F. & G. Weatherby. pp. 8–9 – via Internet Archive.
- Nelson, Keith L. (1975). Victors divided: America and the Allies in Germany, 1918–1923. University of California Press.
- Paul, C. (1985). The politics of hunger: the allied blockade of Germany, 1915–1919. Athens, Ohio: Ohio University Press. p. 145. ISBN 978-0-8214-0831-5.
- Pawley, Margaret (2008). The Watch on the Rhine: The Military Occupation of the Rhineland. I.B. Tauris. ISBN 978-1-84511-457-2.
- Peckham, Robert Shannan, ed. (2003). Rethinking Heritage: Cultures and Politics in Europe. I.B. Tauris. ISBN 978-186064-796-3.
- Peukert, Detlev (1992). The Weimar Republic: The Crisis of Classical Modernity. Translated by Richard Deveson. Hill & Wang. p. 278. ISBN 978-0-8090-9674-9.
- Pinson, Koppel S. (1964). Modern Germany: Its History and Civilization (13th printing ed.). New York: Macmillan. pp. 397 ff. ISBN 0-88133-434-0.
- Probst, Robert (28 June 2019). "'Wir kennen die Wucht des Hasses'" [We can feel the strength of hatred]. Süddeutsche Zeitung (in German). Archived from the original on 7 November 2020.
- "PUNISHING WAR CRIMINALS: Holland Refuses Extradition of ex-Kaiser—Allies Agree to Trial of 890 Others at Leipsic (sic)". Current History. 11 (3). University of California Press: 373–380. 18 February 1920. JSTOR 45325166.
- Reinach, Joseph (1920). "Le rôle de l'impératrice Eugénie en septembre et octobre 1870". Revue d'Histoire du XIXe siècle – 1848 (in French). 17 (85). Société d'Histoire de la Révolution de 1848: 193. doi:10.3406/r1848.1920.1652. Archived from the original on 9 August 2022.
- Reynolds, David (20 February 1994). "Review of "A World at Arms: A Global History of World War II"". The New York Times. Archived from the original on 16 December 2008.
- Ripsman, Norrin M. (2004). Peacemaking by Democracies: The Effect of State Autonomy on the Post-World War Settlements. Pennsylvania State University Press. ISBN 978-027102-398-4.
- Roberts, A.D., ed. (1986). The Cambridge History of Africa: Volume 7 c. 1905–c. 1940. Cambridge University Press. ISBN 978-052122-505-2.
- Roerkohl, Anne (1991). Hungerblockade und Heimatfront: Die kommunale Lebensmittelversorgung in Westfalen während des Ersten Weltkrieges [The hunger blockade and the home front: communal food supply in Westphalia during World War I] (in German). Stuttgart: Franz Steiner. p. 348. ISBN 978-3-515-05661-8.
- Rubner, Max (10 April 1919). "Von der Blockde und Aehlichen". Deutsche Medizinische Wochenschrift. 45 (15). Berlin: 15. doi:10.1055/s-0028-1137673. S2CID 72845627.
- Rudloff, Wilfried (1998). Die Wohlfahrtsstadt: Kommunale Ernährungs-, Fürsorge, und Wohnungspolitik am Beispiel Münchens 1910–1933. Schriftenreihe der Historischen Kommission bei der Bayerischen Akademie der Wissenschaften, Bd. 63 (in German). Göttingen: Vandenhooeck & Ruprecht. p. 184. ISBN 3-525-36056-8.
- "Ruhr occupation". Encyclopaedia Britannica. Archived from the original on 14 April 2023.
- Russell, Frank M. (1951). The Saar: Battleground and Pawn (First ed.). Stanford University Press.
- Schabas, William A. (2018). The Trial of the Kaiser. Oxford University Press. ISBN 978-0-19-187244-0.
- "Scheidemann: "Welche Hand müßte nicht verdorren, die sich und uns in diese Fesseln legt?"" [Scheidemann: "Which hand would not shrivel, that shackled itself and us in such a way?"]. Die Weimarer Republik: Deutschlands erste Demokratie (in German). Weimarer Republik e.V. n.d. Archived from the original on 10 December 2020.
- Schiff, Judith Ann (1 August 1996). "Bibliographical Introduction to "Diary, Reminiscences and Memories of Colonel Edward M. House"". Yale University Library and Social Science Statistical Laboratory. Archived from the original on 23 December 2009.
- Schmitt, Bernadotte (1960), "The Peace Treaties of 1919–1920", Proceedings of the American Philosophical Society, 104 (1): 101–110, JSTOR 985606
- Scott, F. R. (January 1944). "The End of Dominion Status". The American Journal of International Law. 38 (1): 34–49. doi:10.2307/2192530. JSTOR 2192530. S2CID 147122057.
- Shuster, Richard (2006). German Disarmament After World War I: The Diplomacy of International Arms Inspection 1912–1931. Strategy and History. Routledge. ISBN 978-0-415-35808-8.
- Simkins, Peter (2002). The First World War: Volume 3 The Western Front 1917–1918. Osprey Publishing. ISBN 978-184176-348-4.
- Simkins, Peter; Jukes, Geoffrey & Hickey, Michael (2003). The First World War: The War to End All Wars. Osprey Publishing. ISBN 978-184176-738-3.
- Slavicek, Louise Chipley (2010). The Treaty of Versailles. Milestones in Modern World History. Chelsea House Publications. ISBN 978-160413-277-9.
- Sontag, Richard (1971). A Broken World, 1919-1939. Michigan: Harper and Row. ISBN 978-0-06-131651-7 – via Internet Archive.
- Steiner, Barry H. (2007). Collective Preventive Diplomacy: A Study in International Conflict Management. Suny Series in Global Politics. State University of New York Press. ISBN 978-0-7914-5988-1.
- Stevenson, David (1998). "France at the Paris Peace Conference: Addressing the Dilemmas of Security". French Foreign and Defence Policy, 1918–1940: The Decline and Fall of a Great Power. Routledge Studies in Modern European History. New York: Routledge. ISBN 978-0-415-15039-2.
- Stone, Ralph A. (1973). The Irreconcilables: The Fight Against the League of Nations. W.W. Norton & Co. ISBN 978-0-393-00671-1.
- Tampke, Jürgen (2017). A Perfidious Distortion of History. Melbourne: Scribe. pp. vii, xii. ISBN 978-192532-1-944.
- Ther, Philipp & Siljak, Ana, eds. (2001). Redrawing Nations: Ethnic Cleansing in East-Central Europe, 1944–1948. The Harvard Cold War Studies Book Series. Rowman & Littlefield s. ISBN 978-0-7425-1094-4.
- Thompson, Ewa (n.d.). "The Surrogate Hegemon in Polish Postcolonial Discourse" (PDF). Rice University. Archived from the original (PDF) on 29 October 2013.
- Thomson, David (1970). Europe Since Napoleon. Penguin Books. p. 605.
- Tooze, Adam (2007) [First published 2006]. The Wages of Destruction: The Making and Breaking of the Nazi Economy. Penguin Books. ISBN 978-0-14-100348-1.
- Trachtenberg, Marc (1982), "Versailles after Sixty Years", Journal of Contemporary History, 17 (3): 487–506, doi:10.1177/002200948201700305, JSTOR 260557, S2CID 154283533
- "The Treaty of Versailles, 1919". Château de Versailles. 22 November 2016. Archived from the original on 6 November 2020.
- Truitt, Wesley B. (2010). Power and Policy: Lessons for Leaders in Government and Business. Praeger. ISBN 978-031338-240-6.
- Tucker, Spencer C., ed. (1999) [First published 1996]. European Powers in the First World War: An Encyclopedia. Garland Reference Library of the Humanities. Routledge. ISBN 978-081533-351-7.
- Tucker, Spencer C. & Roberts, Priscilla (2005). The Encyclopedia of World War I: A Political, Social, and Military History. ABC=CLIO. ISBN 978-185109-420-2.
- Venzon, Anne Cipriano, ed. (1999). The United States in the First World War: An Encyclopedia. Military History of the United States. Routledge. ISBN 978-081533-353-1.
- Verhandlung der verfassungsgebenden Nationalversammlung: Stenographische Berichte und Drucksachen. Vol. 24. German National Assembly. 1919. pp. 631–635.
- Weinberg, Gerhard L. (1994). A World at Arms: A Global History of World War II. Cambridge University Press. ISBN 0-52144-317-2 – via Internet Archive.
- Weinberg, Gerhard L. (2008) [First published 1995]. Germany, Hitler, and World War II: Essays in Modern German and World History. Cambridge University Press. p. 16. ISBN 978-0-521-56626-1.
- "Why the Nazis achieved power". BBC Bitesize. Archived from the original on 4 March 2020.
- "Why was the Zimmermann Telegram important?". BBC History Magazine. 17 January 2017. Archived from the original on 18 January 2018.
- Widenor, William C. (1980). Henry Cabot Lodge and the Search for an American Foreign Policy. University of California Press. ISBN 0-520-04962-4.
- Wiest, Andrew (2012). The Western Front 1917–1918: From Vimy Ridge to Amiens and the Armistice. Amber Books. pp. 126, 168, 200. ISBN 978-1-906626-13-6.
- Wilde, Robert (29 January 2020). "How the Treaty of Versailles Contributed to Hitler's Rise". ThoughtCo. Archived from the original on 20 October 2020.
- Williamson, David G. (2017). The British in Interwar Germany: The Reluctant Occupiers, 1918–30 (2nd ed.). New York: Bloomsbury Academic. pp. 19, 245. ISBN 978-1-4725-9582-9.
- Wilson, Woodrow (22 January 1917). "Peace Without Victory (speech to Senate)". Digital History. Archived from the original on 25 July 2022.
- Wimer, Kurt & Wimer, Sarah (1967). "The Harding Administration, the League of Nations, and the Separate Peace Treaty". The Review of Politics. 29 (1): 13–24. doi:10.1017/S0034670500023706. JSTOR 1405810. S2CID 145794771.
- Woods, Alan (27 June 2019). The First World War – A Marxist Analysis of the Great Slaughter. Wellred Books. p. 18. ISBN 978-1-913026-13-4.
- Yearwood, Peter J. (2009). Guarantee of Peace: The League of Nations in British Policy 1914–1925. Oxford University Press. ISBN 978-019922-673-3.
- Zaloga, Steven (2002). Poland 1939: The Birth of Blitzkrieg. Campaign. Illustrated by Howard Gerrard. Osprey Publishing. ISBN 978-1-84176-408-5.
