= Dynamic of Destruction =

Book about World War I

Dynamic of Destruction: Culture and Mass Killing in the First World War
- 2007 book jacket
- Author: Alan Kramer
- Series: Making of the Modern World (Oxford University Press series)
- Subject: World War, 1914-1918--Destruction, pillage and atrocities. War crimes. Cultural property destruction. Recovery of Memory.
- Genre: Nonfiction-history
- Set in: World War One, Europe
- Published: July 26, 2007
- Publisher: Oxford University Press
- Publication place: Great Britain, United States
- Media type: Print, Audio, E-book
- Pages: 416
- ISBN: 9780192803429 9780199543779
- OCLC: 85833457
- Dewey Decimal: 940.4/05
- LC Class: D625 .K73 2007
- Website: Official website

Dynamic of Destruction: Culture and Mass Killing in the First World War is an analysis of the causes and attitudes behind the cultural destruction and mass killings during World War I, which indiscriminately included large numbers of civilians. This book was written by Alan Kramer, a professor of history at Trinity College of Dublin. It was first published in 2007 by Oxford University Press. Additionally, this book focuses on and advances the literature pertaining to the Eastern front more than the Western front.

== Synopsis ==
In the book, Kramer expresses the sentiment that the two World Wars can be viewed as a distinct event that produced four decades of agony and upheaval. World War I was not only a new industrial type of warfare. Violence, eradication and annihilation became military policy for most and perhaps all the warring powers. Additionally, Kramer expresses the sentiment of "hooliganism" as policy to be employed toward cultural icons, such as churches. One infamous example occurred in August 1914: "German forces in Louvain, Belgium, not only murdered 248 innocent civilians in cold blood, but burned the city's ancient library to the ground." The author notes that the book "is a story of unremitting violence, destruction, hatred, and misery."

== About the book ==
Research for the book was initially conducted by the author during a 2002–2003 sabbatical leave in Rome, and at the library of the German Historical Institute there. The book is organized by the following chapter titles:

1. The Burning of Louvain
2. The Radicalization of Warfare
3. The Warriors
4. German Singularity?
5. Culture and War
6. Trench Warfare and its Consequences
7. War, Bodies, and Minds
8. Victory, Trauma, and Post-War disorder

The book opens with an introductory chapter. It also includes 33 illustrations, five maps, a concluding chapter, a historiographical note, a notes section, an appendix, and a bibliography section.

== See also ==
- Balkan Wars
- The Balkans Since 1453 by L.S. Stavrianos
- Germany's Aims in the First World War by Fritz Fischer
- The German Myth of the East by Vejas Gabriel Liulevicius
