= Kodjabashis =

Local Christian notables in parts of the Ottoman Empire

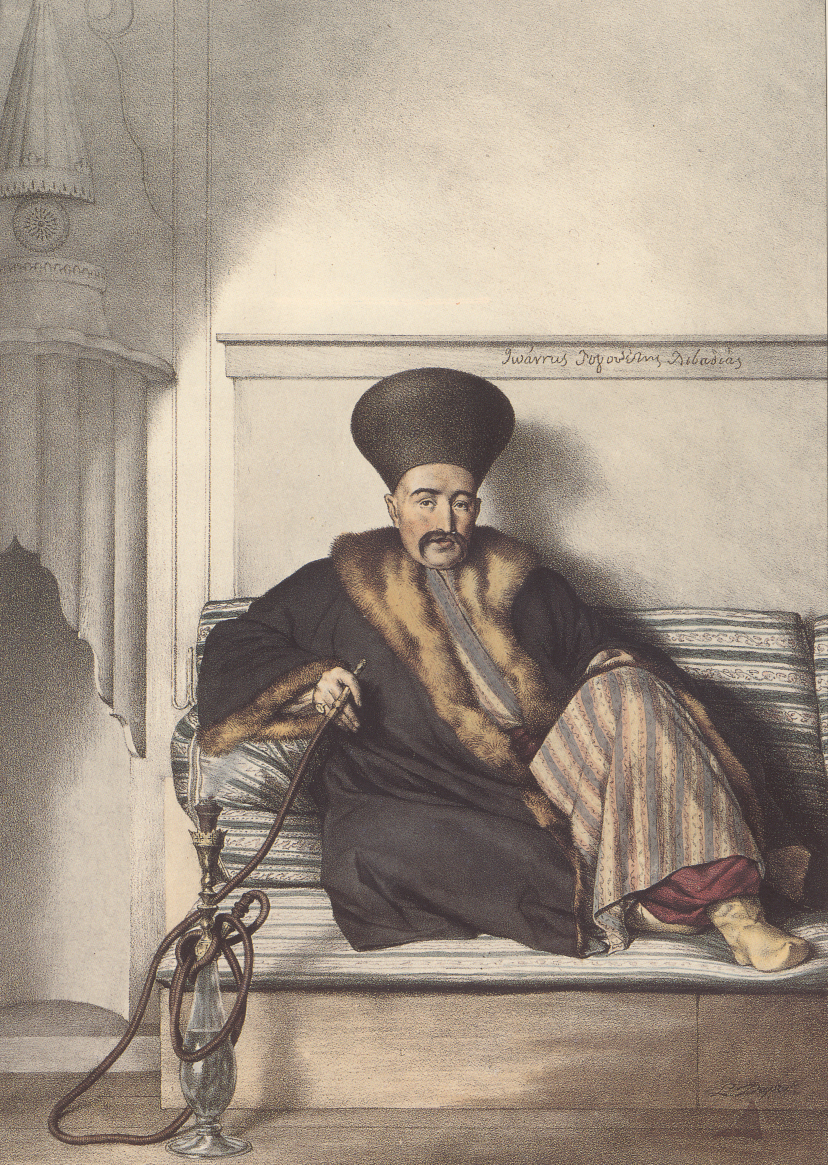
Ioannis Logothetis, proestos of Livadeia, by Louis Dupré

The kodjabashis (Greek: κοτζαμπάσηδες, romanized: kotzabasides; singular κοτζάμπασης, kotzabasis; Serbo-Croatian: kodžobaša, kodžabaša; from Turkish: kocabaṣı, lit. 'office holder' from Turkish: koca, lit. 'big' and Turkish: baṣ, lit. 'head') were local Christian notables in parts of the Ottoman Balkans, most often referring to Ottoman Greece and especially the Peloponnese. They were also known in Greek as proestoi or prokritoi (προεστοί/πρόκριτοι, "primates") or demogerontes (δημογέροντες, "elders of the people"). In some places they were elected (such in the islands for example), but, especially in the Peloponnese, they soon became a hereditary oligarchy, who exercised considerable influence and held posts in the Ottoman administration.

The title was also present in Ottoman Serbia and Bosnia, where it was known as starešina ("elder, chief") instead of the official Turkish name. The terms chorbaji (from Turkish çorbacı) and knez (a Slavic title) were also used for this type of primates, in Bulgaria and Serbia respectively.

The equivalent of the kodjabashis in Orthodox villages was the mukhtar in Muslim villages, while mixed villages had both.

In the Morea Eyalet, the title of mora ayan (μοραγιάνης), is attested, though not in Turkish sources; it was applied to the most senior rank of the local notables of the Peloponnese (Morea), who were members of the provincial council (the 'Divan of the Morea') advising the pasha of the Morea at Tripolitsa. Their number is variously given as 24 (François Pouqueville) or 30 (Athanasios Grigoriadis).

During the Greek War of Independence, the antagonism between the Peloponnesian kodjabashis, who sought to retain their previous preponderance and power, and the military leaders drawn from the klephts, was one of the main driving forces behind the outbreak of the Greek civil wars of 1824–1825, in which the "aristocratic" faction comprising the kodjabashis, the wealthy shipowners of Hydra and the Phanariotes, prevailed.

== See also ==
- Obor-knez
- Rum Millet

== Sources ==
- Fotopoulos, Athanasios Th. (2005). Οι κοτζαμπάσηδες της Πελοποννήσου κατά τη δεύτερη τουρκοκρατία (1715-1821) [The Kodjabashis of the Peloponnese during the Second Turkish Rule (1715–1821)] (in Greek). Athens: Irodotos. ISBN 978-960-825646-0.
- Stavrianos, Leften Stavros (2000) [1958]. The Balkans Since 1453. C. Hurst & Co. Publishers. p. 273. ISBN 1850655510.
- Zakythenos, Dionysios A. (1976). The Making of Modern Greece: From Byzantium to Independence. Rowman and Littlefield. ISBN 978-0-87471-796-9.
