= World War I reparations =

Following their defeat in World War I, the Central Powers agreed to pay war reparations to the Allied Powers. Each defeated power was required to make payments in either cash or kind. Because of the financial situation in Austria, Hungary, and Turkey after the war, few to no reparations were paid and the requirements for reparations were cancelled. Bulgaria, having paid only a fraction of what was required, saw its reparation figure reduced and then cancelled. Historians have recognized the German requirement to pay reparations as the "chief battleground of the post-war era" and "the focus of the power struggle between France and Germany over whether the Versailles Treaty was to be enforced or revised."

The Treaty of Versailles (signed in 1919) and the 1921 London Schedule of Payments required the Central Powers to pay 132 billion gold marks (US$33 billion at the time which is $605 billion in 2025) in reparations to cover civilian damage caused during the war. This figure was divided into three categories of bonds: A, B, and C. Of these, Germany was required to pay towards "A" and "B" bonds totaling 50 billion marks (US$12.5 billion) unconditionally. The payment of the remaining "C" bonds was interest-free and without any specific schedule for payment, instead being contingent on the Weimar Republic's eventual ability to pay, as was to be assessed at some future point by an Allied committee.

Due to the lack of reparation payments by Germany, France occupied the Ruhr in 1923 to enforce payments, causing an international crisis that resulted in the implementation of the Dawes Plan in 1924. This plan outlined a new payment method and raised international loans to help Germany to meet its reparation commitments. Despite this, by 1928, Germany called for a new payment plan, resulting in the Young Plan that established the German reparation requirements at 112 billion marks (US$26.3 billion) and created a schedule of payments that would see Germany complete payments by 1988. As a result of the severe impact of the Great Depression on the German economy, reparations were suspended for a year in 1931, and after the failure to implement the agreement reached in the Lausanne Conference of 1932, no additional reparations payments were made. Between 1919 and 1932, Germany paid less than 21 billion marks in reparations, mostly funded by foreign loans that Adolf Hitler reneged on in 1939.

Many Germans saw reparations as a national humiliation; the German government worked to undermine the validity of the Treaty of Versailles and the requirement to pay. British economist John Maynard Keynes called the treaty a Carthaginian peace that would economically destroy Germany. The consensus of contemporary historians is that reparations were not as intolerable as the Germans or Keynes had suggested and were within Germany's capacity to pay had there been the political will to do so.

Reparations played a significant role in Nazi propaganda, and after coming to power in 1933, Hitler ceased payment of reparations, although Germany still paid interest to holders of reparation bonds until 1939. Following World War II, West Germany took up payments. The 1953 London Agreement on German External Debts resulted in an agreement to pay 50% of the remaining balance. The final payment was made on 3 October 2010, settling German loan debts in regard to reparations.

== Background ==
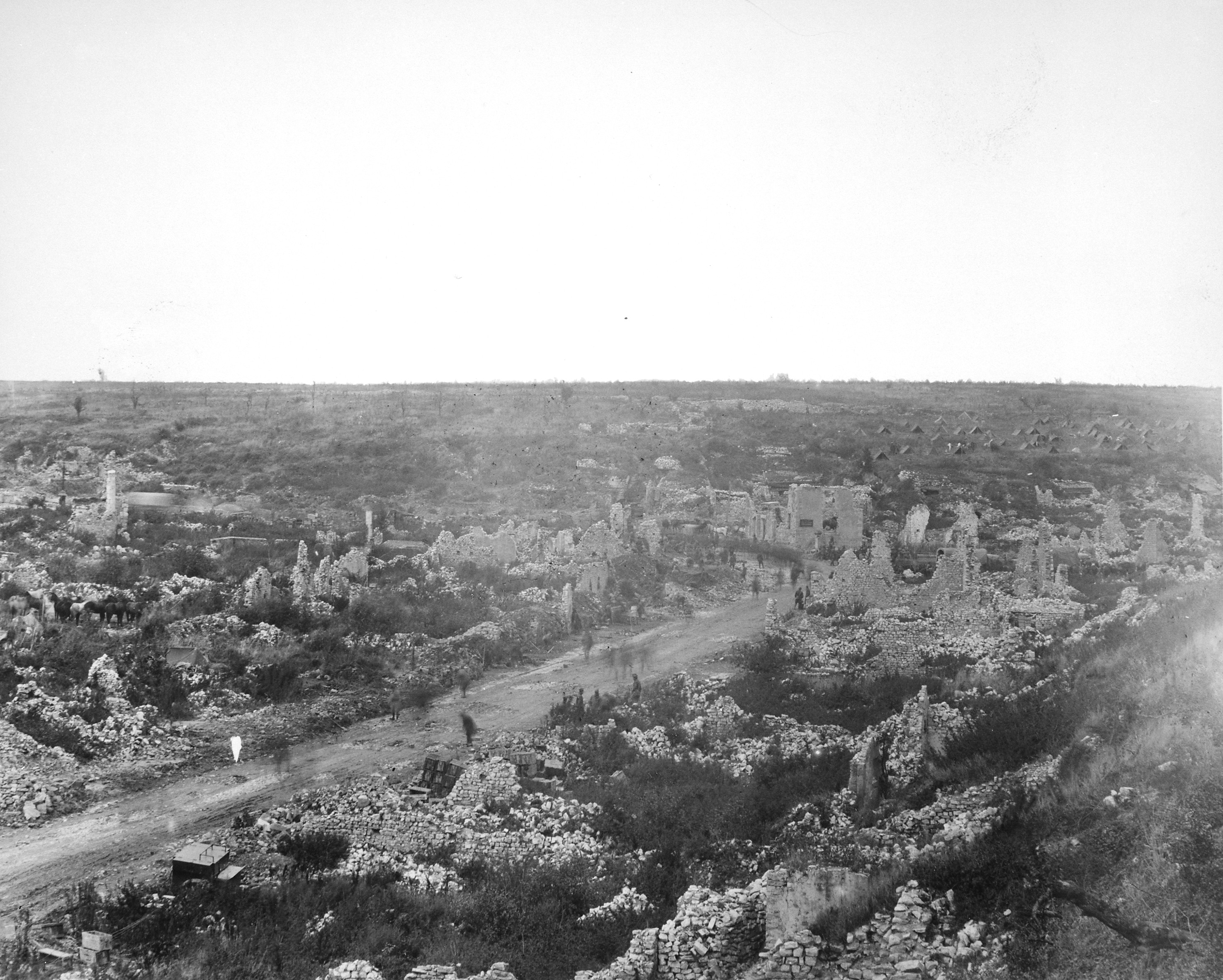
Avocourt, 1918, one of the many destroyed French villages where reconstruction would be funded by reparations.

=== Course of the war ===
In 1914, following the assassination of Archduke Franz Ferdinand by a Serb nationalist, the First World War broke out, with Austria-Hungary declaring war on Serbia, and Germany declaring war on and invading France and Belgium. For the next four years, fighting raged across Europe, the Middle East, Africa, and Asia. On 8 January 1918, United States President Woodrow Wilson issued a statement that became known as the Fourteen Points. In part, this speech called for Germany to withdraw from the territory it had occupied and for the formation of a League of Nations. During the fourth quarter of 1918, the Central Powers began to collapse. In particular, Austria-Hungary collapsed putting southern Germany at risk of invasion, Turkey surrendered freeing up Allied troops for action elsewhere, the German military was decisively defeated on the Western Front, and the German navy mutinied, all of which prompted domestic uprisings that became known as the German Revolution.

Germany signed an armistice with the Allies on 11 November 1918. The armistice agreement included an agreement to pay "reparation for damage done" to the Allied countries.

=== Allied damages ===
Most of the war's major battles occurred in France and Belgium, with both the French countryside and Belgian countryside being heavily scarred in the fighting. Furthermore, in 1918, during the German retreat, German troops devastated France's most industrialized region in the north-east (Nord-Pas de Calais Mining Basin) as well as Belgium. Extensive looting took place as German forces removed whatever material they could use and destroyed the rest. Hundreds of mines were destroyed along with railways, bridges, and entire villages. Prime Minister of France Georges Clemenceau was determined, for these reasons, that any just peace required Germany to pay reparations for the damage it had caused. Clemenceau viewed reparations as a way of weakening Germany to ensure it could never threaten France again. His position was shared by the French electorate. Reparations would also go towards the reconstruction costs in other countries, including Belgium, which were also directly affected by the war. Despite domestic pressure for a harsh settlement, British Prime Minister David Lloyd George opposed overbearing reparations. He argued for a smaller sum, which would be less damaging to the German economy, with a long-term goal of ensuring Germany would remain a viable economic power and trading partner. He also argued that reparations should include war pensions for disabled veterans and allowances for war widows, which would reserve a larger share of the reparations for the British Empire. Wilson opposed these positions and was adamant that no indemnity should be imposed upon Germany.

Damages in France and Belgium included the complete demolition of more than 300,000 houses in German-occupied France, the stripping of more than 6,000 factories of their machinery and the smashing of textile industry in Lille and Sedan, the destruction of nearly 2,000 breweries, the blowing up of 112 mineshafts in Roubaix and Tourcoing, the flooding or blocking-off of more 1,000 miles of mine galleries, the ripping up of more than 1,000 miles of railway, the dropping of more than 1,000 bridges, as well as the looting of churches. German wartime requisitions of farm animals imposed on the civilian population within occupied France and Belgium included roughly 500,000 head of cattle, approximately 500,000 head of sheep, and more than 300,000 head of horses and donkeys. In cleaning up after the war, the French authorities had to remove over 3 hundred million metres of barbed wire and fill in more than a quarter of a billion cubic metres of trenches, with much farmland rendered essentially useless for years after the war due to Unexploded ordnance and contamination by poison gas that continued to leak from buried gas-cylinders which had to be removed.

Allied losses of civilian shipping at sea due to the primarily German U-boat campaign had also been severe, particularly for Britain. Nearly 8 million tons of British civilian shipping had been sunk by German U-boats, with many civilian crew killed. France, Italy, and the United States of America had lost another 2 million tons of merchant shipping, again with heavy losses amongst crew. Another 1.2 million tons of neutral Norwegian, Danish, and Swedish shipping had also been sunk. The sinking of five British hospital ships also caused considerable bitterness.

=== Versailles ===
The Paris Peace Conference opened on 18 January 1919, aiming to establish a lasting peace between the Allied and Central Powers. Demanding compensation from the defeated party was a common feature of peace treaties, including the Treaty of Versailles that Germany had imposed on France in 1871. However, the financial terms of treaties signed during the peace conference were labelled reparations to distinguish them from punitive settlements usually known as indemnities. Reparations were intended for reconstruction and to compensate families who had been bereaved by the war. The opening article of the reparation section of the Treaty of Versailles, Article 231, served as a legal basis for the following articles, which obliged Germany to pay compensation and limited German responsibility to civilian damages. The same article, with the signatory's name changed, was also included in the treaties signed by Germany's allies.

== German reaction ==
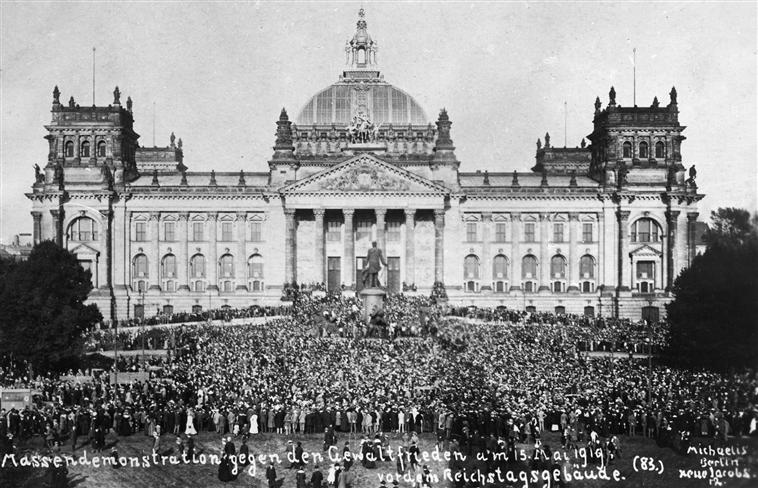
Demonstration against the Treaty of Versailles, in front of the Reichstag.

In February 1919, Foreign Minister Count Ulrich von Brockdorff-Rantzau informed the Weimar National Assembly that Germany would have to pay reparations for the devastation caused by the war, but would not pay for actual war costs. After the drafting of the Treaty of Versailles on 7 May that year, the German and Allied delegations met, and the treaty was handed over to be translated and for a response to be issued. At this meeting, Brockdorff-Rantzau stated, "We know the intensity of the hatred which meets us, and we have heard the victors' passionate demand that as the vanquished we shall be made to pay, and as the guilty we shall be punished". However, he proceeded to deny that Germany was solely responsible for the war.

Article 231 of the Treaty of Versailles was not correctly translated. Instead of stating "[...] Germany accepts responsibility of Germany and her allies causing all the loss and damage [...]", the German Government's edition reads, "Germany admits it, that Germany and her allies, as authors of the war, are responsible for all losses and damages [...]". This resulted in a prevailing belief of humiliation among Germans; the article was seen as an injustice and there was a view that Germany had signed "away her honor". Despite the public outrage, German government officials were aware "that Germany's position on this matter was not nearly so favorable as the imperial government had led the German public to believe during the war". Politicians seeking international sympathy would continue to use the article for its propaganda value, persuading many who had not read the treaties that the article implied full war guilt. German revisionist historians who later tried to ignore the validity of the clause found a ready audience among revisionist writers in France, the United Kingdom, and the United States. The objective of both the politicians and historians was to prove that Germany was not solely guilty for causing the war; this was with the idea that, if that guilt could be disproved, the legal requirement to pay reparations would disappear.

== Evolution of reparations ==
=== Initial demands ===
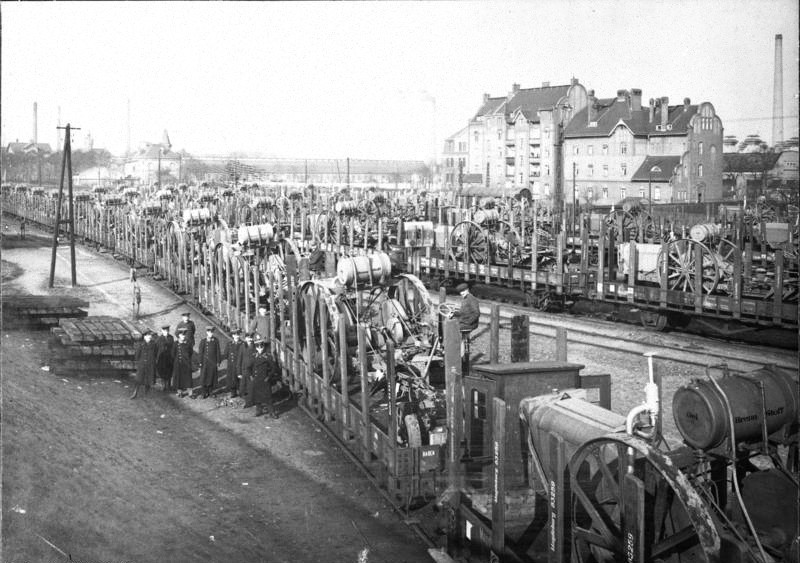
Trains loaded with machinery deliver their cargo in 1920 as reparation payment in kind.

The Treaty of Versailles stated that a Reparation Commission would be established in 1921. This commission would consider the resources available to Germany and her capacity to pay, provide the German Government with an opportunity to be heard on the subject, and decide on the final reparation figure that Germany would be required to pay. In the interim, Germany was required to pay an equivalent of 20 billion gold marks (US$5 billion) in gold, commodities, ships, securities, or other forms. The money would be used to pay Allied occupation costs and to buy food and raw materials for Germany. Article 121 of the Treaty of Neuilly acknowledged that "the resources of Bulgaria are not sufficient to enable her to make complete reparation". Therefore, the treaty required Bulgaria to pay a sum equivalent to 2,250 billion Gold francs in reparations.

The treaties of Saint-Germain-en-Laye, Trianon, and Sèvres acknowledged that Austria, Hungary, and Turkey did not have the resources to pay reparations, and delayed the establishment of a final figure until the Reparation Commission was established. In addition, Bulgaria was required to hand over thousands of livestock to Greece, Romania, and the Serb-Croat-Slovene State "in restitution for animals taken away by Bulgaria during the war". This would not be credited towards the reparation figure. Likewise, Bulgaria had to dispatch 50,000 tons of coal a year to the Serb-Croat-Slovene State in restitution for destroyed mines. These shipments would not be credited against Bulgaria's reparation sum. Germany, Austria, and Hungary all had commitments to hand over timber, ore, and livestock to the Allied Powers. They would, however, be credited for these goods.

In January 1921, the Allied Powers grew impatient and established the reparation sum at 226 billion gold marks. The Germans countered with an offer of 30 billion. On 24 April 1921, the German Government wrote to the American Government expressing "her readiness to acknowledge for reparation purposes a total liability of 50 billion gold marks", but was alternatively prepared "to pay the equivalent of this sum in annuities adapted to her economic capacity totalling 200 billion gold marks". In addition, the German Government stated that "to accelerate the redemption of the balance" and "to combat misery and hatred created by the war", Germany was willing to provide the resources needed and "to undertake herself the rebuilding of townships, villages, and hamlets".

=== London Schedule of Payments ===
The London Schedule of Payments of 5 May 1921 established "the full liability of all the Central Powers combined, not just Germany alone," at 132 billion gold marks. This sum was a compromise promoted by Belgium – against higher figures demanded by the French and Italians and the lower figure the British supported – that "represented an assessment of the lowest amount that public opinion [...] would tolerate".

This figure was divided into three series of bonds: "A" and "B" Bonds together had a nominal value of 50 billion gold marks (US$12.5 billion) – less than the sum Germany had previously offered to pay. "C" Bonds, comprising the remainder of the reparation figure, "were deliberately designed to be chimerical", with the Germans being informed that they would not be expected to pay them under realistic conditions. They were "a political bargaining chip" that served the domestic policies of France and the United Kingdom. The figure was completely unreal; its primary function was to mislead public opinion "into believing that the 132-billion-mark figure was being maintained". Furthermore, "Allied experts knew that Germany could not pay 132 billion marks and that the other Central Powers could pay little. Thus, the "A" and "B" Bonds, which were genuine, represented the actual Allied assessment of German capacity to pay." Taking into account the sum already paid between 1919 and 1921, Germany's immediate obligation was 41 billion gold marks.

To pay towards this sum, Germany could pay in kind or in cash. Commodities paid in kind included coal, timber, chemical dyes, pharmaceuticals, livestock, agricultural machines, construction materials, and factory machinery. The gold value of these would be deducted from what Germany was required to pay. Germany's assistance with the restoration of the university library of Louvain, which was destroyed by the Germans on 25 August 1914, was also credited towards the sum, as were some of the territorial changes the treaty imposed upon Germany. The payment schedule required US$250 million within twenty-five days and then US$500 million annually, plus 26% of the value of German exports. The German Government was to issue bonds at 5% interest and set up a sinking fund of 1% to support the payment of reparations.

In the London ultimatum of 5 May, Germany was given six days to recognize the Schedule of Payments and to comply with the Treaty of Versailles' demands for disarmament and the extradition of German "war criminals". If it did not, the Allies threatened to occupy the Ruhr. In anticipation of such an ultimatum, the German government of Constantin Fehrenbach, finding itself unable to reach agreement on the issue, had resigned on 4 May. The government of the new chancellor, Joseph Wirth, accepted the ultimatum on 11 May and began the "policy of fulfillment" – by attempting to meet the demands, it tried to show the impossibility of complying with the scheduled payments.

=== End of reparations for Austria, Bulgaria, Hungary and Turkey ===
Between the signing of the Treaty of Neuilly-sur-Seine and April 1922, Bulgaria paid 173 million gold francs in reparations. In 1923, the Bulgarian reparation sum was revised downwards to 550 million gold francs, "plus a lump sum payment of 25 million francs for occupation costs". Towards this figure, Bulgaria paid 41 million gold francs between 1925 and 1929. In 1932, the Bulgarian reparation obligation was abandoned following the Lausanne Conference.

Because Austria was "so impoverished" after the war, and because of the collapse of the Bank of Vienna, the country paid no reparations "beyond credits for transferred property". Likewise, Hungary paid no reparations beyond coal deliveries because of the collapse of the Hungarian economy. Turkish reparations had been "sharply limited in view of the magnitude of Turkish territorial losses". However, the Treaty of Sèvres was never ratified. When the Treaty of Lausanne was signed in 1923, Turkish reparations were "eliminated altogether".

=== German defaults ===
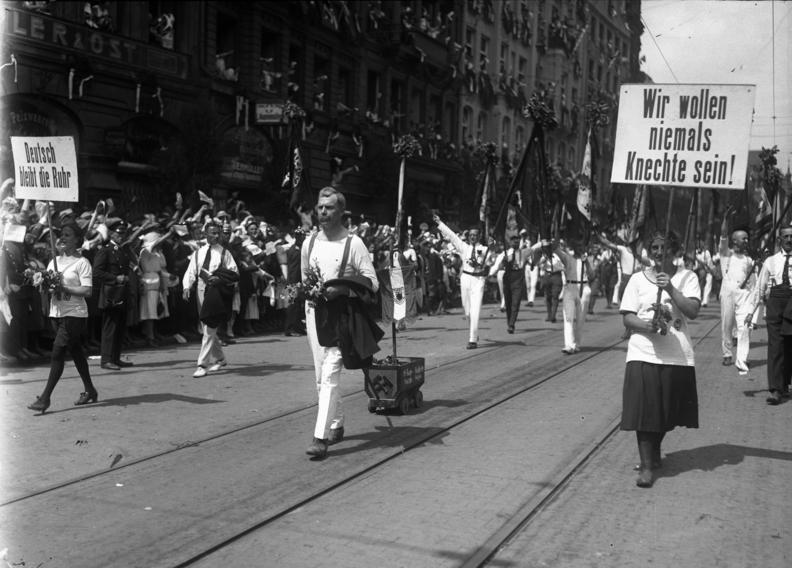
Protests by gymnasts from the Ruhr at the 1923 Munich Gymnastics Festival. The sign on the left reads "The Ruhr remains German". The right placard reads "We never want to be vassals".

From the initiation of reparations, German coal deliveries were below the level agreed. To rectify this, the Spa Conference was held in July 1920. At this conference, it was decided that Germany would be paid five marks per coal ton delivered, to facilitate coal shipments and help feed the miners. Despite this, Germany continued to default on its obligations. By late 1922, the German defaults on payments had grown so serious and regular that a crisis engulfed the Reparations Commission. French and Belgian delegates urged the seizure of the Ruhr to encourage the Germans to make more effort to pay, while the British supported postponing payments to facilitate the financial reconstruction of Germany. On 26 December 1922, Germany defaulted on timber deliveries. The timber quota was based upon a German proposal and the default was massive. (Note: By the 1922 quota deadline, "France had received 29% of her sawn timber allotment and 29% of her share of telegraph poles." While the German default was aimed at France, there "was also substantial default on timber deliveries to Belgium and Italy". Britain "was still awaiting 99.80%" of her 1922 timber deliveries.)

The Allies were unanimous that the default was in bad faith. Whilst Germany had lost important coal-fields in Silesia when these were transferred to Poland under the treaty of Versailles, the required coal-quota had also been reduced. Exporting of German coal to Austria and Switzerland continued until December 1921, when the Reparations Committee banned all exports of German coal except to the Netherlands. In January 1923, despite quota reductions, the German government defaulted on coal deliveries for the 34th time in three years.

On 9 January 1923, the Reparation Commission declared Germany to be in default of its coal deliveries and voted to occupy the Ruhr to enforce the country's reparation commitments. Britain was the lone dissenting voice to both measures. On 11 January, French and Belgian soldiers — supported by engineers including an Italian contingent — entered the region, initiating the Occupation of the Ruhr.

The French Premier Raymond Poincaré was reluctant to order the occupation and had only taken this step after the British had rejected his proposals for more moderate sanctions against Germany. By December 1922, Poincaré was faced with Anglo–American–German hostility; coal supplies for French steel production were running low. Exasperated with Britain's failure to act, he wrote to the French ambassador in London:

Judging others by themselves, the English, who are blinded by their loyalty, have always thought that the Germans did not abide by their pledges inscribed in the Versailles Treaty because they had not frankly agreed to them [...] We, on the contrary, believe that if Germany, far from making the slightest effort to carry out the treaty of peace, has always tried to escape her obligations, it is because until now she has not been convinced of her defeat [...] We are also certain that Germany, as a nation, resigns herself to keep her pledged word only under the impact of necessity.

The occupation proved marginally profitable; the occupying powers received 900 million gold marks, and much of this merely covered the military costs of occupation. The real issue behind the occupation was not German defaults on coal and timber deliveries, but the forcing of Germany "to acknowledge her defeat in World War I and to accept the Versailles Treaty". Poincaré recognized that if Germany could get away with defying Versailles in regard to the reparations, a precedent would be created and inevitably the Germans would proceed to dismantle the rest of the Versailles treaty.

=== Dawes Plan ===
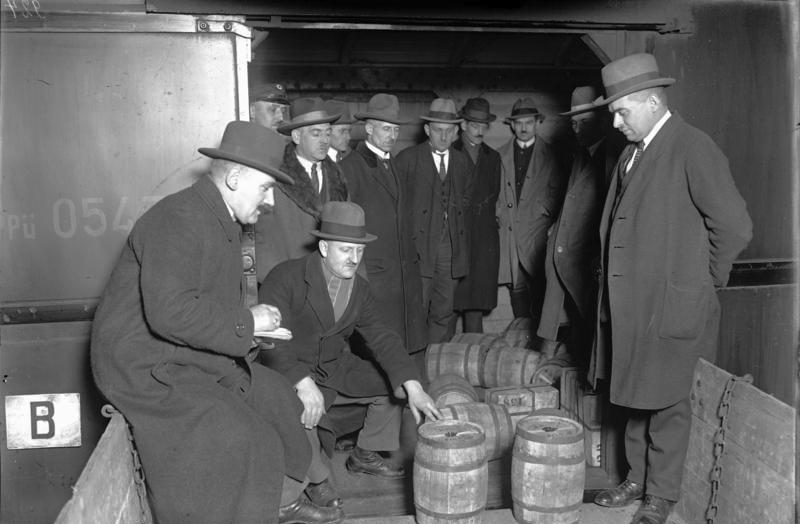
The first American gold arrives as per the Dawes Plan.

Although the French succeeded in their objective during the Ruhr occupation, the Germans had wrecked their economy by funding passive resistance and brought about hyperinflation. Under Anglo-American pressure and a simultaneous decline in the value of the franc, France was increasingly isolated and her diplomatic position was weakened. In October 1923, a committee consisting of American, Belgian, British, French, German, and Italian experts and chaired by the former Director of the U.S. Bureau of the Budget Charles G. Dawes was formed, to consider "from a purely technical standpoint", how to balance the German budget, stabilize the economy and set an achievable level of reparations.

In April 1924, the Dawes Plan was accepted and it replaced the London schedule of payment. While the "C" Bonds were omitted from the plan's framework, they were not formally rescinded. French troops were to withdraw from the Ruhr, and a bank independent of the German government, with a ruling body at least 50% non-German, was to be established and the German currency was to be stabilized. The payment of reparations was also reorganized. In the first year following the implementation of the plan, Germany would have to pay 1 billion marks. This figure would rise to 2.5 billion marks per year by the fifth year of the plan. A Reparations Agency was established with Allied representatives to organize the payment of reparations. Furthermore, a loan of 800 million marks was to be raised — over 50% coming from the United States, 25% from Britain, and the balance from other European nations — to back the German currency and to aid in the payment of reparations.

=== Young Plan ===
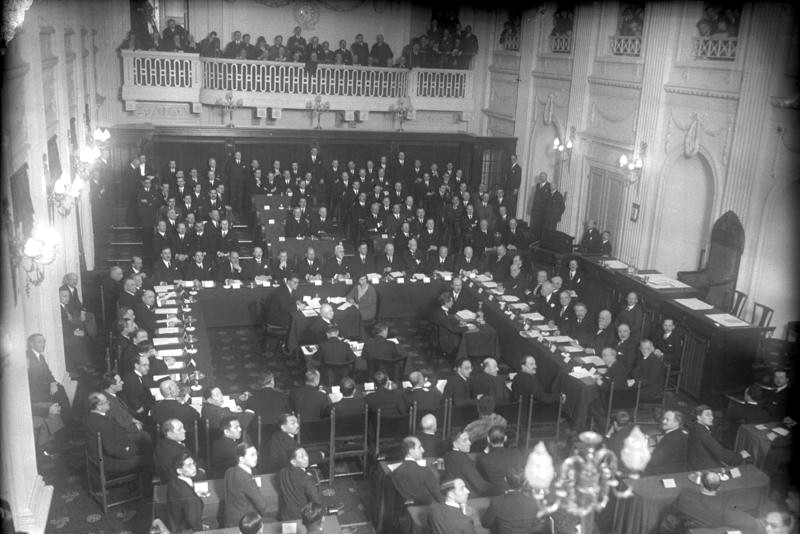
The opening of the Second Hague Conference: one of the two conferences aimed at implementing the Young Plan.

The adoption of the plan was followed by the Locarno Treaties. The subsequent "spirit of Locarno" saw an apparent reconciliation between the European Powers. The implementation of the Dawes Plan also saw a positive economic impact in Europe, largely funded by American loans. Under the Dawes Plan, Germany always met her obligations. However, German long-term goals remained the same despite the apparent reconciliation: the revision of the Treaty of Versailles to end reparations. The Dawes Plan was seen as only a temporary measure, with expected future revisions. In late 1927, the Agent-General for Reparations "called for a more permanent scheme" for payments and in 1928 the Germans followed suit. German Foreign Minister Gustav Stresemann called for a final reparation plan to be established alongside an early withdrawal of Allied troops from the Rhineland. The French, aware of their weakening political and financial position, acquiesced. On 16 September 1928, a joint Entente-German statement acknowledging the need for a new reparation plan was issued.

In February 1929, a new committee was formed to re-examine reparations. It was chaired by the American banker Owen D. Young and presented its findings in June 1929. The "Young Plan" was accepted and ratified by the German government on 12 March 1930. The plan established a theoretical final reparation figure at 112 billion gold marks (US$26.35 billion), with a new payment schedule that would see reparations completed by 1988 – the first time a final date had been set. In addition, foreign oversight of German finances was to end with the withdrawal of the Reparations Agency, which would be replaced by the Bank for International Settlements. The bank was established to provide cooperation among central banks and to receive and disburse reparation payments. A further loan of US$300 million was to be raised and given to Germany.

As a result of the plan, German payments were half the sum required under the Dawes Plan. The implementation of the Young Plan required the Anglo-French withdrawal from the Rhineland within months. Despite the reduction, there was increasing German hostility to the plan. For example, the Law against the Enslavement of the German People, or Freedom Law, was proposed by the nationalist politician Alfred Hugenberg. Hugenberg's proposed law called for the end of the Ruhr occupation, the official renouncement of Article 231 (the "war guilt" clause), and the rejection of the Young Plan. While politicians rejected it, it attracted enough support from voters in order to be put up for a referendum. The plebiscite was held in December 1929, resulting in 5.8 million people out of 6.3 million voters voting in favor of the law. This fell below the required 21 million votes (50% of eligible voters) in order for it to take effect. While this was a political defeat for Hugenberg, it did result in significant national attention for Adolf Hitler, who had worked with Alfred Hugenberg to promote the referendum, and subsequently in valuable right-wing financing.

=== End of German reparations ===
In March 1930, the German Government collapsed and was replaced by a new coalition led by Chancellor Heinrich Brüning. In June, Allied troops withdrew from near Mainz — the last occupation zone in the Rhineland — and Brüning's Government broached the subject of demanding further refinement to reparations, but this demand was refused by William Tyrrell, the British ambassador to France. During 1931, a financial crisis began in Germany. In May, Creditanstalt — the largest bank in Austria — collapsed, sparking a banking crisis in Germany and Austria. In response, Brüning announced that Germany was suspending reparation payments. This resulted in a massive withdrawal of domestic and foreign funds from German banks. By mid-July, all German banks had closed. Until this point, France's policy had been to provide Germany with financial support to help Brüning's Government stabilize the country. Brüning, now under considerable political pressure from the far-right and President Paul von Hindenburg, was unable to make any concessions or reverse policy. As a result, Brüning was unable to borrow money from foreign or domestic sources. Further attempts to enlist British support to end reparations failed; the British said it was a joint issue with France and the United States. In early July, Brüning announced "his intention to seek the outright revision of the Young Plan". In light of the crisis and with the prospect of Germany being unable to repay her debts, United States President Herbert Hoover intervened. In June, Hoover publicly proposed a one-year moratorium on reparations and war debts. By July, the "Hoover Moratorium" had been accepted.

The moratorium was widely supported in both Germany and the United Kingdom. The French, initially hesitant, eventually agreed to support the American proposal. However, on 13 July, the German Darmstädter Bank collapsed, leading to further bankruptcies and a rise in unemployment, further exacerbating Germany's financial crisis. With the Great Depression now exerting its influence, the Bank for International Settlements reported that the Young Plan was unrealistic in light of the economic crisis and urged the world governments to reach a new settlement on the various debts they owed each other. During January 1932, Brüning said he would seek the complete cancellation of reparations. His position was supported by the British and Italians, and opposed by the French.

Because of the political differences between countries on the subject and the impending elections in France and Germany, a conference could not be established until June. On 16 June 1932, the Lausanne Conference opened. However, discussions were complicated by the ongoing World Disarmament Conference. At the latter conference, the United States informed the British and French that they would not be allowed to default on their war debts. In turn, they recommended that war debts be tied to German reparation payments, to which the Germans objected. On 9 July, an agreement was reached and signed. The Lausanne Conference annulled the Young Plan and required Germany to pay a final, single installment of 3 billion marks. The Lausanne Treaty was to become effective as soon as a corresponding agreement had been reached with the United States on the repayment of the loans it had made to the Allied powers during World War I. Due to the failure to come to such an agreement, the Lausanne Treaty was not ratified by any of the states involved and therefore never became legally valid. Germany still paid interest on bonds created under the Dawes and Young plans until 1939, but did not resume paying reparations until after 1945.

=== Amount paid by Germany ===
The precise figure Germany paid is a matter of dispute. The German government estimated it had paid the equivalent of 67.8 billion gold marks in reparations. The German figure included — other than gold or goods in kind — the scuttling of the German fleet at Scapa Flow, state property lost in lands ceded to other countries, and the loss of colonial territories. The Reparation Commission and the Bank for International Settlements state that 20.598 billion gold marks were paid by Germany in reparations, of which 7.595 billion was paid before the implementation of the London Schedule of Payments. Niall Ferguson provides a slightly lower figure. He estimates that Germany paid no more than 19 billion gold marks. Ferguson further estimates that this sum amounted to 2.4% of Germany's national income between 1919 and 1932. Stephen Schuker, in his comprehensive econometric study, concedes that Germany transferred 16.8 billion marks over the whole period, but points out that this sum was vastly offset by the devaluation of Allied paper-mark deposits up to 1923, and by loans that Germany subsequently repudiated after 1924. The net capital transfer into Germany amounted to 17.75 billion marks, or 2.1% of Germany's entire national income over the period 1919–1931. In effect, America paid Germany four times more, in price-adjusted terms, than the U.S. furnished to West Germany under the post-1948 Marshall Plan. According to Gerhard Weinberg, reparations were paid, towns were rebuilt, orchards replanted, mines reopened and pensions paid. However, the burden of repairs was shifted away from the German economy and onto the damaged economies of the war's victors. Hans Mommsen wrote "Germany financed its reparation payments to Western creditor nations with American loans", which the British and French then used to "cover their long-term interest obligations and to retire their wartime debts with the United States."

=== Loan payments ===
Germany's payment of reparations during the 1920s was funded mostly through foreign loans. In 1933, as well as stopping all reparations payments, the new German Chancellor Adolf Hitler, in large part, repudiated payment of these loans, including a default on all of the debt owed in U.S. Dollar bonds. In June 1953, an agreement was reached on this existing debt with West Germany. West Germany agreed to repay 50% of the loan amounts that had been defaulted on in the 1920s, but deferred some of the debt until West and East Germany were unified. In 1995, following reunification, Germany began making the final payments towards the loans. A final installment of US$94 million was made on 3 October 2010, settling German loan debts in regard to reparations.

=== Summary ===
| Event | German gold marks (billions) | U.S. dollars (billions) | 2019 US$ (billions) | Approximate percentage of Germany's GNP in 1925 (Note: Economic historian Paul Bairoch calculated German GNP in 1925 as approximately 45,002 million US Dollars at 1960 prices (see Bairoch, Paul (1976): "Europe's Gross National Product: 1800–1975", Journal of European Economic History, Vol. 5, pp. 273–340), which converts to approximately 388,685 million US dollars at 2019 prices) |
|---|---|---|---|---|
| Initial German offer, 24 April 1921 | 50 (capital value) or 200 in annuities (nominal value) | 12.5 – 50 (Note: No figure currently found showing the exact mark to dollar conversion. Instead, the estimated dollar value has been presented based on Sally Marks' comment that while the "paper mark depreciated rapidly, the gold mark held at 4 to the dollar and 20 to the pound.") | 179 – 717 | 53% – 184% |
| J.M. Keynes proposal in The Economic Consequences of the Peace, 1919 | 40 | 10 | 147 | 38% |
| London Schedule of Payments, 5 May 1921 (All Central Powers) | 132 | 33 | 473 | 123% |
| A and B Bonds, of the above payment scheme | 50 | 12.5 | 179 | 46% |
| Young Plan, 1929 | 112 | 26.35 | 392 | 101% |
| Total German payments (cash. credit for state assets, and in-kind) made by 1932 | 19–20.5 | 4.75 – 5.12 | 89 – 96 | 23%–25% |

== Analysis ==
=== Effect on the German economy ===
==== Overall ====
During the period of reparations, Germany received between 27 and 38 billion marks in loans. By 1931, German foreign debt stood at 21.514 billion marks; the main sources of aid were the United States, Britain, the Netherlands, and Switzerland. Detlev Peukert argued that the financial problems that arose in the early 1920s were a result of post-war loans and the way Germany funded her war effort, and not the result of reparations. During the First World War, Germany did not raise taxes or create new ones to pay for war-time expenses. Rather, loans were taken out, placing Germany in an economically precarious position as more money entered circulation, destroying the link between paper money and the gold reserve that had been maintained before the war. With its defeat, Germany could not impose reparations and pay off its war debts now, which were now colossal.

Historian Niall Ferguson partially supports this analysis: had reparations not been imposed, Germany would still have had significant problems caused by the need to pay war debts and the demands of voters for more social services. Ferguson argued that these problems were aggravated by a trade deficit and a weak exchange rate for the mark during 1920. Afterwards, as the value of the mark rose, inflation became a problem. None of these were the result of reparations. According to Ferguson, even without reparations, total public spending in Germany between 1920 and 1923 was 33% of total net national product. A. J. P. Taylor wrote "Germany was a net gainer by the financial transactions of the nineteen-twenties: she borrowed far more from private American investors [...] than she paid in reparations". P. M. H. Bell stated the creation of a multi-national committee, which resulted in the Dawes Plan, was done to consider ways the German budget could be balanced, the currency stabilized, and the German economy fixed to ease reparation payments. Max Winkler wrote that from 1924 onward, German officials were "virtually flooded with loan offers by foreigners". Overall, the German economy performed reasonably well until the foreign investments funding the economy and the loans funding reparations payments were suddenly withdrawn after the 1929 Stock Market Crash. This collapse was magnified by the volume of loans provided to German companies by American lenders. Even the reduced payments of the Dawes Plan were mainly financed through a large volume of international loans.

While Germany initially had a trade deficit, British policy during the early 1920s was to reintegrate Germany into European trade as soon as possible. Likewise, France attempted to secure trade deals with Germany. During the mid-to-late 1920s, trade between France and Germany grew rapidly. French imports of German goods "increased by 60%", highlighting the close links between French industrial growth and German production, and the increase in cooperation between the countries.

Max Hantke and Mark Spoerer provide a different perspective on the effect of reparations on the German economy. They wrote that focusing on the reparations and inflation ignores "the fact that the restriction of the German military to 115,000 men relieved the German central budget considerably". Hantke and Spoerer argue that their findings show "that even under quite rigorous assumptions the net economic burden of the Treaty of Versailles was much less heavy than has been hitherto thought, in particular if we confine our perspective to the Reich's budget". They say, "though politically a humiliation", the limitation on the military "was beneficial in fiscal terms" and that their economic models show that "the restriction of the size of the army was clearly beneficial for the Reich budget". Additionally, their economic scenarios indicate that while the Treaty of Versailles was "overall clearly a burden on the German economy", it "also offered a substantial peace dividend for Weimar's non-revanchist budget politicians." They conclude that, "The fact that [these politicians] did not make sufficient use of this imposed gift supports the hypothesis that the Weimar Republic suffered from home-made political failure".

==== Hyperinflation ====
A logarithmic scale depicting Weimar hyperinflation to 1923. One paper Mark per Gold Mark increased to one trillion paper Marks per Gold Mark.

Historians and economists differ on the subject of whether, and to what extent, reparations were a cause of hyperinflation in the Weimar Republic.

Amongst those stating that it was a cause, Erik Goldstein wrote that in 1921, the payment of reparations caused a crisis and that the occupation of the Ruhr had a disastrous effect on the German economy, resulting in the German Government printing more money as the currency collapsed. Hyperinflation began, and printing presses worked overtime to print Reichsbank notes; by November 1923, one US dollar was worth 4,200,000,000,000 marks. Ferguson writes that the policy of the Economics Minister Robert Schmidt led Germany to avoid economic collapse from 1919 to 1920, but that reparations accounted for most of Germany's budget deficit in 1921 and 1922 and that reparations were the cause of the hyperinflation.

Several historians counter the argument that reparations caused the inflation and collapse of the mark, particularly on the grounds that reparations payments, and particularly hard-cash payments, were, in large part, not made during the period of hyperinflation and so could not be the cause of it. Gerhard Weinberg writes that Germany refused to pay, and by doing so destroyed their own currency. Anthony Lentin agrees and writes that inflation was "a consequence of the war rather than of the peace" and that hyperinflation was a result of the "German government's reckless issue of paper money" during the Allied occupation of the Ruhr.

Contemporary British and French experts believed that the Mark was being sabotaged to avoid budgetary and currency reform and to evade reparations, a view supported by Reich Chancellery records. Historian Sally Marks endorsed that view, writing that historians who say reparations caused hyperinflation have overlooked "that the inflation long predated reparations" and the way "inflation mushroomed" between mid-1921 and the end of 1922 "when Germany was actually paying very little in reparations" and have failed to explain why "the period of least inflation coincided with the period of largest reparation payments [...] or why Germans claimed after 1930 that reparations were causing deflation". She writes "there is no doubt that British and French suspicions late in 1922 were sound". Marks also writes that the "astronomic inflation which ensued was a result of German policy", whereby the government paid for passive resistance in the Ruhr "from an empty exchequer" and paid off its domestic and war debts with worthless marks. Bell agrees and writes that "inflation had little direct connection with reparation payments themselves, but a great deal to do with the way the German government chose to subsidize industry and to pay the costs of passive resistance to the occupation [of the Ruhr] by extravagant use of the printing press". Bell also writes that hyperinflation was not an inevitable consequence of the Treaty of Versailles, but was among the actual results.

=== Criticism and commentary ===
==== Contemporaneous ====
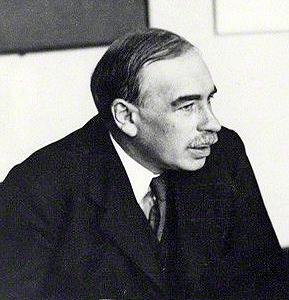
John Maynard Keynes in 1933.

According to historian Claude Campbell, John Maynard Keynes "set the fashion for critics of the economic aspects of the treaty" and "made probably the severest and most sweeping indictment of its economic provisions". Keynes was temporarily attached to the British Treasury during the war and was their official representative at the peace conference. He later resigned "when it became evident that hope could no longer be entertained of substantial modifications in the draft Terms of Peace" due to the "policy of the Conference towards the economic problems of Europe".

In 1919, Keynes wrote The Economic Consequences of the Peace based on his objections to the Versailles treaty. He wrote that he believed "that the campaign for securing out of Germany the general costs of the war was one of the most serious acts of political unwisdom for which our statesmen have ever been responsible", and called the treaty a "Carthaginian peace" that would economically affect all of Europe. Keynes said that the figures being bandied about by politicians at the time of the signing of the treaty, such as US$25 billion or even US$50 billion, were "not within the limits of reasonable possibility". He instead calculated that US$10 billion was the "safe maximum figure", but though he also "did not believe that [Germany could] pay as much". He predicted that the Reparation Commission was a tool that could "be employed to destroy Germany's commercial and economic organization as well as to exact payment".

Writing of his proposed US$10 billion figure, fixing reparations "well within Germany's capacity to pay" would "make possible the renewal of hope and enterprise within her territory" and "avoid the perpetual friction and opportunity of improper pressure arising out of the Treaty clauses". Keynes identified reparations as the "main excursion into the economic field" by the Treaty of Versailles, but said that the treaty excluded provisions for rehabilitating Europe's economies, for improving relations between the Allies and the defeated Central Powers, for stabilizing Europe's new nations, for "reclaim[ing] Russia", or for promoting economic solidarity between the Allies. Coal provides an example of these destabilizing effects in Germany and beyond. Keynes said the "surrender of the coal will destroy German industry", but conceded that without coal shipments as reparations, the French and Italian industries damaged directly by the war or indirectly by damage to coal mines would be affected. He writes that this is "not yet the whole problem". The repercussions would also affect Central and Northern Europe, and neutral states such as Switzerland and Sweden, which made up for their own coal deficiencies by trading with Germany. Likewise, Keynes said Austria would now be consigned to "industrial ruin" as "nearly all the coalfields of the former Empire lie outside of what is now German-Austria".

Campbell writes that the "apparent majority did not regard the treaty as perfect". Bernard Baruch writes in The Making of the Reparation and Economic Sections of the Treaty that most believed it to be the best agreement obtainable under the circumstances and that it was a minority that attacked the treaty, but these attacks "centered upon its economic provisions". James T. Shotwell, writing in What Germany Forgot, said, "the only 'unendurable servitudes' in the treaty were in the sections on Reparation and the Polish settlement and raised the question as to what part of Germany's grievance against the peace lay in the substance of its exactions and what part in the manner of their imposition". Sir Andrew McFayden, who also represented the British Treasury at the peace conference and later worked with the Reparation Commission, published his work Don't Do it Again. McFayden's position "falls somewhere between the views of Keynes and Shotwell". His attack on reparations "was as harsh as Keynes" but he conceded that the "fault did not lie primarily in the provisions of the treaty but in their execution". He also believed "that the Polish settlement was the only readjustment [...] which was decidedly unwise".

Albrecht-Carrié writes that before the German surrender, Woodrow Wilson dispatched a note to the German government on 5 November 1918 stating that the Allies "under-stand that compensation will be made by Germany for all damage done to the civilian population of the Allies and their property by the aggression of Germany by land, by sea, and from the air", the terms of which they accepted. Regardless of which, Albrecht-Carrié says the reparation section of the treaty proved "to be a dismal failure". Campbell says, "although there was much in the peace that was "petty, unjust, and humiliating", there was little aside from reparation clauses and certain territorial concessions, which had much real bearing upon Germany's economic future". Summarizing the view of economists throughout the 1920s, she says the territorial changes to Germany were "not necessarily [...] economically unsound", but than the removal of the Saar and territory to Poland "depriv[ed] Germany of her resources in excess of the amount necessary to fulfill the legitimate economic demands of the victors [...] [and] was indefensible". Campbell also said the treaty failed to include "provisions looking to the restoration of Germany to her former position as the chief economic and financial stabilizing influence in central Europe" and that this was economically shortsighted and was an economic failing of the treaty.

Étienne Mantoux, a French economist, was the harshest contemporaneous critic of Keynes. In his posthumously published book, The Carthaginian Peace, or the Economic Consequences of Mr. Keynes, Mantoux said that Keynes "had been wrong on various counts, especially with respect to his predictions about Germany's coal, iron and steel production [...] and its level of national saving". Keynes said Europe's overall output of iron would decrease; Mantoux said the opposite occurred. By 1929, European iron output had increased by 10% from that of 1913. Keynes believed that this European trend would also affect German iron and steel production. Mantoux says this prediction was also incorrect. By 1927, German steel output had increased by 30%, and iron output had increased by 38% from 1913. Keynes predicted that German coal extraction would also decrease and that Germany would not be able to export coal immediately after the war. Mantoux also counters these arguments. By 1920, Germany was exporting 15 million tons of coal a year and reached 35 million tons by 1926. By 1929, German coal mining had risen by 30% on the 1913 figures because of its increased labor efficiency methods. In regard to national savings, Keynes stated that 2 billion marks would only be possible after the adoption of the treaty. Mantoux says that the 1925 German national savings figure was estimated at 6.4 billion marks, rising to 7.6 billion marks by 1927. Mantoux calculated that Germany borrowed between 8 billion and 35 billion marks in the period 1920–1931, while only paying 21 billion in reparations. This, he says, allowed Germany to re-equip, expand, and modernize her industry. Highlighting the rearmament under Hitler, Mantoux said Germany "had been in a stronger position to pay reparations than Keynes had made out". He also says that Germany could have paid all of the reparations if she had wanted to, and that the problem was not that Germany was unable to pay, but that she was unwilling to pay.

In 1954, United States Secretary of State John Foster Dulles — one of the authors of Article 231 — said that, "Efforts to bankrupt and humiliate a nation merely incite a people of vigor and of courage to break the bonds imposed upon them [...] Prohibitions thus incite the very acts that are prohibited."

==== Modern ====
Geoff Harcourt writes that Keynes' arguments that reparations would lead to German economic collapse have been adopted "by historians of almost all political persuasions" and have influenced the way historians and the public "see the unfolding events in Germany and the decades between Versailles and the outbreak of the Second World War". He says Mantoux's work "is not simply a critique of Keynes", but "a stimulus to question the received wisdom's interpretation of the unfolding events in Germany". Harcourt says that despite it discussing Keynes' errors "in great detail", Mantoux's work "has not led us to revise our general judgment of Keynes", yet "it does make us question the soundness of theoretical and empirical aspects" of his arguments. A. J. P. Taylor writes that in 1919 "many people believed that the payment of reparations would reduce Germany to a state of Asiatic poverty", and that Keynes "held this view, as did all Germans; and probably many Frenchmen". However, he also says these "apprehensions of Keynes and the Germans were grotesquely exaggerated".

According to Martel, Taylor "shrewdly concludes that Étienne Mantoux had the better of his controversy with John Maynard Keynes". Stephen A. Schuker writes that Keynes' "tendentious but influential" book was "ably refuted" by Mantoux. Richard J. Evans says "the economic history of the 1920s and early 1930s seemed to confirm" the arguments of Keynes, yet "as we now know" Keynes' reparation arguments were wrong. Evans says the economic problems that arose were a result of the inflation of 1923, which lay with the German government rather than reparations.

According to Slavicek, the "traditional interpretation of the treaty's impact on Germany" was that it "plunged the nation into an economic free fall". This view was shared by the German people, who believed the treaty was robbing Germany of its wealth. German banker Max Warburg said the terms of the treaty were "pillage on a global scale". Niall Ferguson says the German view was incorrect and "not many historians would today agree with Warburg". However, several historians agree with Warburg. Norman Davies writes that the treaty forced Germany to "pay astronomic reparations", while Tim McNeese states, "France and Britain had placed war damages on Germany to the tune of billions of gold marks, which the defeated Germans could not begin to pay in earnest". Ferguson says the reparations were "less of a burden than Keynes and others claimed" and that the "potential burden on national income of the annuity vary from 5% to 10%". However, he cautions against underestimating the initial German effort to pay. Before the implementation of the Dawes Plan, Germany transferred between 8 and 13 billion gold marks, which amounted to "between 4 and 7% of total national income". Ferguson says "the annuity demanded in 1921 put an intolerable strain on the state's finances" and that total expenditure between 1920 and 1923 amounted to "at least 50% of Reich revenue, 20% of total Reich spending and 10% of total public spending". Thus, Ferguson says, reparations "undermined confidence in the Reich's creditworthiness" and "were therefore excessive — as the German government claimed".

Hantke and Spoerer write that "reparation payments were indeed a severe economic burden for Germany" and that "the German economy was deprived of between one and 2.2 billion Reichsmark (RM) annually, which amounted in the late 1920s to nearly 2.5% of Germany's GDP". Gerald Feldman writes, "there can be no question that the entire London schedule could be viewed as a way of reducing the reparations bill without the Allied publics being fully informed of what was going on. This was recognized by at least some German politicians, one of whom optimistically argued that "the entente will only demand the 50 billion marks, not the rest. They have only called for the rest for domestic political reasons"." Feldman also says the prospect that the 'C' bonds would be evoked hung over the German Government like a "Damocles Sword". In addition to Feldman and Ferguson's opposition, Peter Kruger, Barry Eichengreen, and Steven Webb agree that "the initial German effort to pay reparations" was substantial and "produced an immense strain" on the German economy.

Several historians take the middle ground between condemning reparations and supporting the argument that they were not a complete burden upon Germany. Detlev Peukert states, "Reparations did not, in fact, bleed the German economy" as had been feared; the "psychological effects of reparations were extremely serious, as was the strain that the vicious circle of credits and reparations placed on the international financial system". P.M.H. Bell writes that while reparations were unwelcome in Germany and caused a "strain on the German balance of payments", they could be paid and were "compatible with a general recovery in European commerce and industry". According to Martel, Robert Boyce said reparations were "a heavy burden on Germany, both as a financial charge [...] and as a charge on Germany's balance of payments". However, he says that while "Germany claimed it could not afford to pay reparations" this was far from the truth, and that "[...] Germany had made little effort to pay reparations. It refused to levy the necessary taxes, and far from accumulating the foreign exchange required for their payment by collecting some of the overseas earnings of German exporters, it allowed them to leave their earnings abroad". William R. Keylor agrees with Boyce, and says, "an increase in taxation and reduction in consumption in the Weimar Republic would have yielded the requisite export surplus to generate the foreign exchange needed to service the reparation debt". However, Charles Feinstein writes that these kind of arguments overlook the extreme reluctance of the Germans "to accept even a modest increase in taxation to meet what was universally regarded as an unjustified and oppressive imposition by hostile adversaries". Feinstein says that "even if the economic aspects [...] were not as crippling as had been assumed in the 1920s, the exaction of reparations was still of deep political and psychological significance for Germany".

Sally Marks writes, "There are those [...] who claim reparations were unpayable. In financial terms, that is untrue [...] Of course Germans did not want to pay; nobody ever wants to pay, and Weimar was determined not to do so [...] Raising taxes would have provided ample funds [...] Weimar could have borrowed from the citizenry, as France did after 1871 [to pay its indemnity to Germany]". Marks writes that Germany could have easily paid the 50 billion marks in reparations, but instead chose to repeatedly default on payments as part of a political strategy of undermining Versailles. Marks says that in 1921, Germany met its requirements in full because customs posts were occupied by Allied troops. Once the Allies had relinquished control of the customs posts, Germany made no further payments in cash until 1924, following the implementation of the Dawes Plan. Marks says that while Article 231 of the Treaty of Versailles "established an unlimited theoretical liability", Article 232 limited German responsibility to pay only for civilian damages. When the 1921 London conference to determine how much Germany should pay was called, the Allies calculated on the basis of what Germany could pay, not on their own needs. In this way, Marks says, the Germans largely escaped paying for the war and instead shifted the costs onto American investors. Marks states that the delay in establishing a final total until 1921, "was actually in Germany's interest" because the figures discussed at the peace conference were "astronomic". She says, "The British experts, Lords Sumner and Cunliffe, were so unrealistic that they were nicknamed "the heavenly twins"." Marks also says, "much ink has been wasted on the fact that civilian damages were stretched to cover war widows' pensions and allowances for military dependents". As reparations were based on what Germany could pay, Marks says the inclusion of such items did not affect German liability but altered distribution of reparations; the "inclusion of pensions and allowances increased the British share of the pie but did not enlarge the pie."

Bernadotte Schmitt writes that if "pensions and separation allowances [...] not been included, reparations would probably never have become the bogey that poisoned the post-war world for so many years". Taylor says, "no doubt the impoverishment of Germany was caused by war, not by reparations. No doubt the Germans could have paid reparations, if they had regarded them as an obligation of honour, honestly incurred." However, he says, "reparations [...] kept the passions of war alive". Peter Liberman writes that while the Germans believed they could not meet such demands of them, the "French believed that Germany could pay and only lacked the requisite will" to do so. Liberman says this is "a position that has gained support from recent historical research". In regard to Germany's capacity to pay, he focuses on coal and says that German coal consumption per capita was higher than France's despite coal shipments being consistently short. He also says, "the reparations demanded at Versailles were not far out of proportion to German economic potential" and that in terms of national income it was similar to what the Germans demanded of France following the Franco-Prussian War. Martin Kitchen also says the impression that Germany was crippled by the reparations is a myth. Rather than a weakened Germany, he states the opposite was true.

Keylor says that literature on reparations has "long suffered from gross misrepresentation, exaggeration, and outright falsification" and that it "should finally succumb to the archive-based discoveries of scholars". Diane Kunz, summarizing the historiography on the subject, writes that historians have refuted the myth that reparations placed an intolerable burden on Germany. Marks says a "substantial degree of scholarly consensus now suggests that paying [...] was within Germany's financial capacity". Ruth Henig writes, "most historians of the Paris peace conference now take the view that, in economic terms, the treaty was not unduly harsh on Germany and that, while obligations and damages were inevitably much stressed in the debates at Paris to satisfy electors reading the daily newspapers, the intention was quietly to give Germany substantial help towards paying her bills, and to meet many of the German objections by amendments to the way the reparations schedule was in practice carried out".

== See also ==
- Aftermath of World War I
- Legal remedy
- Restitution
- Reparation (legal)
- Reparations
- Reparations Agreement between Israel and West Germany, Holocaust reparations
- War reparations
- World War II reparations

== Bibliography ==
- Albrecht-Carrié, René (March 1940). "Versailles Twenty Years After". Political Science Quarterly. 55 (1): 1–24. doi:10.2307/2143772. JSTOR 2143772.
- Albrecht-Carrié, René (1960). France, Europe and the Two World Wars. E. Droz. ISBN 978-2-600-04276-5.
- Backhaus, Jürgen (2012) [2011]. The Beginnings of Scholarly Economic Journalism: The Austrian Economist and The German Economist. The European Heritage in Economics and the Social Sciences. Springer. ISBN 978-1-461-40078-3.
- Bell, P. M. H. (1997) [1986]. The Origins of the Second World War in Europe (2nd ed.). Pearson. ISBN 978-0-582-30470-3.
- Beller, Steven (2007). A Concise History of Austria. Cambridge Concise Histories. Cambridge University Press. ISBN 978-0-521-47886-1.
- Binkley, Robert C.; Mahr, A. C. (June 1926). "A New Interpretation of the Responsibility Clause in the Versailles Treaty". Current History. 24 (3): 398–400. doi:10.1525/curh.1926.24.3.398. S2CID 249693067.
- Boemeke, Manfred F.; Feldman, Gerald D.; Glaser, Elisabeth (1998). Versailles: A Reassessment after 75 Years. Publications of the German Historical Institute. Cambridge University Press. ISBN 978-0-521-62132-8.
- Boyer, Paul S.; Clark, Clifford E.; Hawley, Sandra; Kett, Joseph.F; Rieser, Andrew (2009). The Enduring Vision: A History of the American People. Vol. 2: From 1865. Cengage Learning. ISBN 978-0-547-22278-3.
- Brezina, Corona (2006). The Treaty of Versailles, 1919: A Primary Source Examination of the Treaty That Ended World War I. Primary Sources of American Treaties. Rosen Central. ISBN 978-1-4042-0442-3.
- Herring, George C.; Carroll, John M. (1996). Modern American Diplomacy. Lanham, Maryland: Rowman & Littlefield Publishers. ISBN 0842025545.
- Campbell, Claude A. (January 1942). "Economic Errors of the Treaty of Versailles". Southwestern Social Science Quarterly (23): 160–165. ProQuest 1291566833.
- Cord, Robert (2013). Reinterpreting the Keynesian Revolution. Routledge. ISBN 978-0-203-07752-8.
- Crafts, Nicholas; Fearon, Peter (2013). The Great Depression of the 1930s: Lessons for Today. Oxford University Press. ISBN 978-0-199-66318-7.
- Crampton, R. J. (1987). A Short History of Modern Bulgaria. Cambridge University Press. ISBN 978-0-521-25340-6.
- Davies, Norman (2007). Europe at War 1939–1945: No Simple Victory. Pan Books. ISBN 978-033035-212-3.
- Evans, Richard J. (2008). "Hitler and the origins of the war, 1919–1939". Gresham College.
- Feinstein, Charles H. (1995). Banking, Currency, and Finance in Europe between the Wars. Oxford University Press. ISBN 978-0-198-28803-9.
- Feldman, Gerald D. (1997) [1996]. The Great Disorder: Politics, Economics, and Society in the German Inflation 1914–1924. Oxford University Press. ISBN 978-0-195-10114-0.
- Ferguson, Niall (1998). The Pity of War: Explaining World War I. Allen Lane. ISBN 978-0-713-99246-5.
- Grenville, John A. S.; Wasserstein, Bernard (2000) [1987]. The Major International Treaties of the Twentieth Century. Routledge. ISBN 978-0-415-14125-3.
- Hantke, Max; Spoerer, Mark (2010). "The imposed gift of Versailles: the fiscal effects of restricting the size of Germany's armed forces, 1924–1929" (PDF). The Economic History Review. 63 (4): 849–864. doi:10.1111/j.1468-0289.2009.00512.x. S2CID 91180171.
- Harcourt, Geoff C. (2012). On Skidelsky's Keynes and Other Essays: Selected Essays of G. C. Harcourt. Palgrave Macmillan. ISBN 978-0-230-28468-5.
- Harsch, Donna (2009). German Social Democracy and the Rise of Nazism. University of North Carolina Press. ISBN 978-0-80785-733-5.
- Hehn, Paul N. (2005). A Low Dishonest Decade: The Great Powers, Eastern Europe, and the Economic Origins of World War II, 1930–1941. Bloomsbury Publishing. ISBN 978-0-826-41761-9.
- Henig, Ruth (1995) [1984]. Versailles and After: 1919–1933. Routledge. ISBN 978-0-415-12710-3.
- Immerman, Richard H. (1998). John Foster Dulles: Piety, Pragmatism, and Power in U.S. Foreign Policy. Biographies in American Foreign Policy (Book 2). Rowman & Littlefield. ISBN 978-0-8420-2601-7.
- Joshi, Srivastava (2005) [1978]. International Relations. GOEL Publishing House. ISBN 978-8-185-84270-7.
- Keylor, William R. (2013). "The Demonization of Versailles". H-Diplo.
- Kitchen, Martin (2006). Europe between the wars. Longman. ISBN 978-0-582-89414-3.
- Keynes, John Maynard (1920). The Economic Consequences of the Peace. Harcourt Brace and Howe.
- Kindleberger, Charles Poor (1986). The World in Depression, 1929–1939. University of California Press. ISBN 978-0-520-05592-6.
- Kramer, Alan (2008). Dynamic of Destruction: Culture and Mass Killing in the First World War. The Making of the Modern World. Penguin Books. ISBN 978-1-846-14013-6.
- Lentin, Antony (January 2012). "Germany: a New Carthage?". History Today. pp. 20–27.
- Liberman, Peter (1995). Does Conquest Pay? The Exploitation of Occupied Industrial Societies. Princeton Studies in International History and Politics. Princeton University Press. ISBN 978-0-691-02986-3.
- Nohlen, Dieter; Stöver, Philip (2010). Elections in Europe: A Data Handbook. Nomos Publishing. ISBN 978-3-8329-5609-7.
- MacMillan, Margaret (2003). Peacemakers: The Paris Peace Conference of 1919 and Its Attempt to End War. John Murray (publishing house). ISBN 978-0-719-56237-2.
- McNeese, Tim; Jensen, Richard (2010). World War II 1939–1945. Discovering U.S. History (1st ed.). Chelsea House Publications. ISBN 978-160413-358-5.
- Mantoux, Étienne (1952). The Carthaginian Peace: Or the Economic Consequences of Mr. Keynes (1st ed.). Scribner.
- Marks, Sally (September 1978). "The Myths of Reparations". Central European History. 11 (3): 231–255. doi:10.1017/s0008938900018707. JSTOR 4545835. S2CID 144072556.
- Marks, Sally (September 2013). "Mistakes and Myths: The Allies, Germany, and the Versailles Treaty, 1918–1921". The Journal of Modern History. 85 (3): 632–659. doi:10.1086/670825. JSTOR 10.1086/670825. S2CID 154166326.
- Martel, Gordon (1999). "Origins of the Second World War Reconsidered Second Edition". Routledge. ISBN 978-0-415-16325-5.
- Martel, Gordon (2010). A Companion to Europe 1900–1945. Wiley-Blackwell. ISBN 978-1-4443-3840-9.
- Mommsen, Hans; Foster, Elborg (1988). The Rise and Fall of Weimar Democracy. University of North Carolina Press. ISBN 978-0-807-84721-3.
- Morrow, John H. (2005). The Great War: An Imperial History. Routledge. ISBN 978-0-415-20440-8.
- Peukert, Detlev J. K. (1993) [1989]. The Weimar Republic. Hill & Wang. ISBN 978-0-809-01556-6.
- Schuker, Stephen A. (1988). American Reparations to Germany, 1919–1933. Princeton Studies in International Finance. ISBN 978-0-881-65233-8.
- Schuker, Stephen A. (1976). End of French Predominance in Europe: Financial Crisis of 1924 and the Adoption of the Dawes Plan. University of North Carolina Press. ISBN 978-0-807-81253-2.
- Schmitt, Bernadotte Everly (February 1960). "The Peace Treaties of 1919–1920". Proceedings of the American Philosophical Society. 104 (1): 101–110. JSTOR 985606.
- Schwarzschild, Leopold (1942). World in trance: From Versailles to Pearl Harbor. L. B. Fischer Publishing Corporation.
- Shamir, Haim (1989). Economic Crisis and French Foreign Policy: 1930–1936. Brill Publishers. ISBN 978-9-004-08958-7.
- Simkins, Peter (2002). The First World War. Vol. 3 The Western Front 1917–1918. Osprey Publishing. ISBN 978-1-84176-348-4.
- Simkins, Peter; Jukes, Geoffrey; Hickey, Michael (2003). The First World War: The War to End All Wars. Osprey Publishing. ISBN 978-1-84176-738-3.
- Slavicek, Louise Chipley (2010). The Treaty of Versailles. Milestones in Modern World History. Chelsea House Publications. ISBN 978-1-60413-277-9.
- Taylor, David (2001). Modern World History for OCR specification 1937. Heinemann Educational Publishers. ISBN 978-0-435-30831-5.
- Taylor, A. J. P. (1991) [1961]. The Origins of the Second World War. Penguin Books. ISBN 978-0-140-13672-2.
- Temin, Peter; Toniolo, Gianni (2008). The World Economy between the Wars. Oxford University Press. ISBN 978-0-195-30755-9.
- Tooze, Adam (2007) [2006]. The Wages of Destruction: The Making and Breaking of the Nazi Economy. Penguin Books. ISBN 978-014100348-1.
- Tucker, Spencer C.; Roberts, Priscilla (2005). The Encyclopedia of World War I: A Political, Social, and Military History. ABC-Clio. ISBN 978-1-85109-420-2.
- United States Department of State (1921). "Papers relating to the foreign relations of the United States, 1921 Volume II". United States Government Printing Office.
- Weinberg, Gerhard L. (1994). A World at Arms: A Global History of World War II. Cambridge University Press. ISBN 978-0-521-44317-3.
- Winkler, Max (1933). Foreign Bonds: An Autopsy. Beard Books. ISBN 978-1-893-12243-7.
- October 1917 – August 1930 Volume 5. World Peace Foundation pamphlets, v. 1–12. World Peace Foundation. 1922.
- Yearwood, Peter J. (2009). Guarantee of Peace: The League of Nations in British Policy 1914–1925. Oxford University Press. ISBN 978-0-19-922673-3.
- Young, William (2006). German Diplomatic Relations 1871–1945: The Wilhelmstrasse and the Formulation of Foreign Policy. iUniverse. ISBN 978-0-595-40706-4.
