= The German Myth of the East =

2009 book by Vejas Gabriel Liulevicius

- 2009 book cover
- Author: Vejas Gabriel Liulevicius
- Subject: European History, Political History, Russian and Eastern European History, Modern History (1700 to 1945), Intellectual History, International Relations, Military History, German Public Opinion.
- Genre: Nonfiction
- Set in: Europe, Germany
- Publisher: Oxford University Press
- Publication date: 2009
- Publication place: Britain and United States
- Pages: 292
- Awards: Duke of Westminster's Medal for Military Literature, New York Times Bestseller
- ISBN: 9780199546312 also 0199546312
- OCLC: 690589585
- Preceded by: War Land on the Eastern Front: Culture, National Identity, and German Occupation in World War I
- Website: Oxford Academic

The German Myth of the East: 1800 to the Present is a nonfiction cultural historical account of centuries of durable German myth-making about the lands to the east of them as written by Vejas Gabriel Liulevicius and published by Oxford University Press in 2009.

== Synopsis ==
In this book the geographic East refers to eastern parts of Germany as well as lands that are east of Germany's borders. According to Liulevicius, this German view of the East was mixed. Influential people from high culture to popular culture saw the East as wild, dangerous, disorganized, and dirty, while others conversely saw it as captivating, intoxicating, as a transformational experience or as a desirable place of endless promise and opportunity. Each of these beliefs provided a rationale for a possible future civilizing mission.

So, the book analyzes this phenomenon from around 1800 to 2009, the year the book was published. However, these popular psychological projections stretched from the Middle Ages until the second World War's end in 1945. Hence, focusing on the East was occurring well before Germany unified as a nation state.

Also, this focus on the East has its counterpart in America's own romanticized view of the Wild West. For example, the mythologized East as a destination served as the German's equivalent of America's Manifest destiny. Likewise, according to the book, the German people were impacted by the mythologized East in the same way that Americans have been affected by their own formative stories based on the mythical West.

== About the book ==
Expanding on themes in Liulevicius's previously ″well received″ nonfiction book entitled, ″War Land on the Eastern Front: Culture, National Identity, and German Occupation in World War I,″ this book provides further insight into German thought and experience in the East. Also, according to Gary D. Stark, who reviewed this book for The Journal of Modern History: ″Liulevicius draws from a wide array of published primary sources (economic, political, military, and historical tracts; novels, memoirs, and diaries; speeches and manifestos) and on all the relevant secondary literature.″

=== Chapter list ===
Below is the list of chapters, which are numbered from one to nine.

1. Introduction
2. Older Legacies Before 1800
3. Influences of Enlightenment and Romanticism, 1800–1820s
4. Fusing the Myth, 1830–1871
5. Age of Empires, 1871–1914
6. The First World War and its Aftermath, 1914–1933
7. Nazi Visions of the East
8. Nightmare of the Advancing East, 1943–1955
9. From the Cold War to the Present

After the chapters, this book also has a select bibliography and an index.
