= Traian Stoianovich =

American historian (1921–2005)

- Born: 20 July 1921
- Died: 21 December 2005 (aged 84)
- Education: University of Rochester B.A. New York University M.A. Université de Paris PhD
- Occupation: Historian

Traian Stoianovich (July 20, 1921 – December 21, 2005) was an American historian and a professor of history at Rutgers University. He specialized in the history of the Balkans.

== Biography ==
Born Trajan Stojanović (Serbian Cyrillic: Трајан Стојановић) in Gradešnica, then part of the Kingdom of Serbs, Croats and Slovenes (now part of North Macedonia), his family moved to Rochester, New York, where he was brought up. At a time when it was difficult for working-class people and immigrants to achieve higher education, he earned his undergraduate degree from the University of Rochester. After serving in the United States Army during World War II (1942–45), he took a master's degree at New York University and received a doctorate from Université de Paris in 1952, where he became a major figure in the internationally influential Annales School of history.

Stoianovich was for four decades a teacher of European and world history at Rutgers University. He has also taught at New York University, University of California, Berkeley, Stanford University, and Sir George Williams University (renamed Concordia University) in Montreal, Canada. He taught at the University of Thessaloniki, Greece, 1958–1959, on a Fulbright grant.

He applied his education to the study of the Balkans, publishing "A Study of Balkan Civilization" (1967) which is regarded as both a classic and a major educational text. After his retirement he published a four volume collection of articles and essays, "Between East and West, the Balkan and Mediterranean Worlds" (1992–1995) and also "Balkan Worlds: The First and Last Europe" (1994) rich in its insights and understanding for both the Balkans and European civilization. Many of his works were translated into Serbian and published in the former Yugoslavia, as well as other major languages.

Dr. Norman Markowitz, JRI Director, Professor of History, Rutgers University, remembers him well:

I had the privilege of knowing Traian Stoianovich as an outstanding colleague and friend at Rutgers University, both before and after his retirement. A kind and gentleman, Traian was fiercely proud in a non-chauvinist way of his Serbian heritage and of the achievements of the Serbian people. He detested not only the NATO war that devastated Serbia and dismembered Yugoslavia, but what he regarded as the racist libels and slanders directed against the Serbian people both during and after the war. When the politicians and generals who directed that war of aggression are ugly footnotes to history, his work as a scholar and his enormously positive achievements as a teacher will continue to live.

He was a member of the Jasenovac Research Institute's advisory board. He continued to work as a scholar right up to his death on December 21, 2005, in New Brunswick, New Jersey, after a long struggle with cancer.

== Family ==
Traian Stoianovich was married to French painter Marcelle Stoianovich, active mostly in Paris. His daughter Diana Stoianovich (previously fashion editor at L'Officiel and publicity director of Henri Bendel), married in 1986 to Charles H. Revson Jr., heir of Charles Revson and they have two sons, Charles H. Revson III and Alexander Traian Revson. His son Christian Stoianovich is a screenwriter.

== Selected works ==
- The Pattern of Serbian Intellectual Evolution 1830-1880. 1959.
- Conquering Balkan Orthodox Merchant. 1960.
- A Study in Balkan Civilization. Knopf, 1963.
- French Historical Method. Cornell University Press, 1976.
- Between East and West: The Balkan and Mediterranean Worlds. 1992–1995, 4 volumes.
- Balkan Worlds: The First and Last Europe. Armonk, New York, and London, England: M.E. Sharpe, 1994.
- Introduction to The Balkans Since 1453, by Leften Stavros Stavrianos. New York: New York University Press, 2009.

== Sources ==
- Vryonis, Speros (2006). "Трајан Стојановић пионир историје балканских народа". Зборник Матице српске за друштвене науке. 120. Translated by Kostić, Veselin. Matica srpska: 11–16. ISSN 0352-5732.
- Đokić, Vlastimir (2006). "Трајан Стојановић : (1921-2005)". Зборник Матице српске за друштвене науке. 120. Matica srpska: 7–9. ISSN 0352-5732.
- Bell, Rudolph M. (April 2006). "In Memoriam: Traian Stoianovich (1920-2005)". American Historical Association.
