= The Balkans Since 1453 =

1958 book by L.S. Stavrianos

- First edition
- Author: L.S. Stavrianos
- Language: English
- Subject: History
- Publisher: Holt McDougal
- Publication date: 1958
- Pages: 970

The Balkans Since 1453 is a book by the Greek-Canadian historian L.S. Stavrianos published in 1958. It is a large, synthetic work which encompasses the major political, economic and cultural events of the Balkans from the fall of the Byzantine Empire to the late 1940s.

Stavrianos paid particular attention to the national awakening and the nation-building process in the Balkans. The book was highly acclaimed by many historians of the Balkans, including Traian Stoianovich and Mark Mazower.
