= L. S. Stavrianos =

Greek-Canadian historian (1913–2004)

- Born: 1913; Vancouver, British Columbia, Canada
- Died: March 23, 2004 (aged 91); La Jolla, California, US
- Citizenship: American
- Education: University of British Columbia; Clark University
- Scientific career
- Fields: History
- Workplaces: Queens, Smith, Northwestern, UCSD

Leften Stavros Stavrianos (1913 – March 23, 2004) was a Greek-Canadian historian. His most influential books are considered to be A Global History: From Prehistory to the 21st Century and The Balkans since 1453. He was one of the first historians to challenge Orientalist views of the Ottoman Empire.

== Biography ==
Stavrianos was born in Vancouver, British Columbia, Canada in 1913. He received a B.A. in history from the University of British Columbia, and a M.A. and Ph.D. from Clark University in Worcester, Massachusetts.

Stavrianos joined the faculty of Queen's University in Kingston, Ontario and Smith College in Northampton, Massachusetts. He then became a professor at Northwestern University in 1946. After retiring from Northwestern in 1973, Stavrianos joined the University of California, San Diego Department of History until 1992.

== Bibliography ==
- A Global History: From Prehistory to the 21st Century (7th ed.). Upper Saddle River, New Jersey: Prentice Hall. 1998 [1970]. ISBN 978-0-13-923897-0.
- The Balkans since 1453. With an introduction by Traian Stoianovich. New York: NYU Press. 2000. ISBN 978-0-8147-9766-2.

Chronological list

- The Movement for Balkan Unity to 1912 (1937 Clark University dissertation)
- Balkan Federation: A History of the Movement toward Balkan Unity in Modern Times (1942, 1944)
- First Balkan Alliance System, 1860-1876 (1942)
- Greece: The War and Aftermath ... (1945)
- Greece: American Dilemma and Opportunity (1952)
- The Ottoman Empire: Was It the Sick Man of Europe? (1957, 3rd ed. 1966)
- Antecedents to the Balkan Revolutions of the Nineteenth Century (1957)
- The Balkans Since 1453 (1958, 2nd ed. 2000, 4th ed. 2008)
- A Global History of Man (1962) (with many co-authors)
- Readings in World History (1962, 3rd ed. 1970)
- The Balkans, 1815-1914 (Holt, Rinehart and Winston, 1963). ISBN 978-0-0308-2841-6
- The Soviet Union: A Culture Area in Perspective (1964)
- Sub-Saharan Africa: A Culture in Perspective (1964) (with Loretta Kreider Andrews)
- Latin America: A Culture Area in Perspective (1965) (with George I. Blankenstein)
- India: A Culture Area in Perspective (1966) (with Lacey Baldwin Smith)
- China: A Culture Area in Perspective (1966) (with Roger F. Hackett)
- The Middle East: A Culture Area in Perspective (1966)
- The World Since 1500: A Global History (1966)
- The Epic of Modern Man: A Collection of Readings (Pearson, 1966; 2nd ed. 1971). ISBN 978-0-1328-3333-2
- The Epic of Man to 1500: A Collection of Readings (1970)
- The World to 1500: A Global History (Pearson, 1970; 3rd ed. 1983; 7th ed. 1999). ISBN 978-0-1392-3905-2
- Man's Past and Present: A Global History (Prentice Hall, 1971). ISBN 978-0-1355-2083-3
- The World of Mankind: Man the Toolmaker (1973)
- The Promise of the Coming Dark Age (1976)
- Global Rift: The Third World Comes of Age (Morrow, 1981) ISBN 978-0-6880-0656-3
- Lifelines from Our Past: A New World History (Routledge, 1989, rev. ed. 1997). ISBN 978-0-7656-0180-3
