= Weimar political parties =

German political parties

The Weimar German Republic that existed from 1918 to 1933 had a multi-party political system in which numerous political parties were competitive and able to contest elections. In the fourteen years that the German Republic was in existence, over forty political parties were represented by at least one member in the Reichstag, with others seeing representation just at the Landtag level. In addition to this, many groups and minor political parties existed which were often linked to more prominent political parties, and stood candidates through shared electoral lists.

This political fragmentation was in part due to the many challenges facing the nascent German democracy in this period and many contrasting views on the developments on-going in Germany, and in part due to the specific form of proportional representation electoral system that did not harshly punish regional or small special-interest parties.

After the Nazi seizure of power, they used the provisions of the Reichstag Fire Decree to effectively eliminate their chief adversaries, first the Communists (March 1933) and then the Social Democrats (22 June 1933) through arrests, confiscation of assets and removal from office. Other parties were pressured into disbanding on their own or were swept away by the "Law Against the Formation of Parties" (14 July 1933) which declared the Nazi Party to be the only legal political party, turning Germany into a one-party state.

== Larger political parties ==
Logo	Party	Abbr.	Political Position	Ideology	Description
Sozialdemokratische Partei Deutschlands, Logo 1969-1982	Social Democratic Party of Germany Sozialdemokratische Partei Deutschlands	SPD	Centre-left to left-wing	Pro-Weimar Republic; Social Democracy; Center Marxism; Republicanism	Founded in 1875, it was one of the earliest Marxist-influenced parties in the world. A member of the Weimar Coalition, the SPD supported the parliamentary system of democracy and extensive social programs in the economy. For most of the Weimar Republic's existence until 1932, the SPD was the largest single party in the Reichstag and it participated in several coalition governments. Between 1917 and 1922, during the period of the USPD split from the party, the SPD was known as the Majority SPD (MSPD). Its party newspaper was the Vorwärts.
NSDAP-Logo	National Socialist German Workers' Party Nationalsozialistische Deutsche Arbeiterpartei	NSDAP	Far-right	Anti-Weimar Republic; Nazism; Antisemitism; Anti-Young Plan	A far-right party active between 1920 and 1945, and the name sake of Nazism. Its precursor, the German Workers' Party, existed from 1919 to 1920. The NSDAP emerged from the milieu of paramilitant Freikorps extremism. It supported the ideas of Führerprinzip, Volksgemeinschaft, Pan-Germanism, Lebensraum and the "Aryan Master Race". The party's platform included fervent antisemitism, anti-communism, anti-capitalism, scientific racism, and support for eugenics. Headed by Adolf Hitler from 1921, the party became the largest in the Reichstag by July 1932. Its main newspaper was the Völkischer Beobachter.
Kommunistische Partei Deutschlands, Logo um 1920	Communist Party of Germany Kommunistische Partei Deutschlands	KPD	Far-left	Communism; Luxemburgism; Council Communism; Marxism-Leninism	A communist party that advocated revolution by the proletariat, taking example from the Russian Revolution. Formed at the very end of 1918 out of a number of left-wing groups, including the left wing of the USPD and the Spartacus League. It was the main far-left party for the majority of the Weimar period. The party's major paper was the Die Rote Fahne (The Red Flag). Between 1920 and 1922 known as the United Communist Party of Germany
	Centre Party Zentrumspartei	Z	Centre to centre-right	Pro-Weimar Republic; Christian Democracy; Political Catholicism; Republicanism	A continuation of the pre-Weimar Catholic party of the same name. A member of the Weimar Coalition, the Centre Party was the third-largest party in the Reichstag for most of the Weimar Republic and participated in all governments until 1932. Their party newspaper was Germania.
Logo of the German Centre Party	German National People's Party Deutschnationale Volkspartei	DNVP	Right-wing to far-right	Anti-Weimar Republic; German Nationalism; Authoritarian conservatism National conservatism Anti-communism; Anti-semitism	A reactionary party that presented itself as a volksgemeinschaft or non-class party. It was formed from the merger of multiple conservative, and national liberal parties with the Völkische movement. The DNVP was the main authoritarian right party of Weimar Germany but moved to the radical right after coming under the control of Alfred Hugenberg. It organized the National Opposition in 1929, together with leaders of Der Stahlhelm, Hjalmar Schacht, the president of the Reichsbank, and the Nazi Party, to oppose Chancellor Hermann Müller's Grand Coalition. It joined in coalition with Hitler's government in January 1933.
German People's Party	German People's Party Deutsche Volkspartei	DVP	Before 1929: Centre-right; After 1929: Right-wing	National Liberalism; Civic nationalism Conservative liberalism Constitutional Monarchism	A right-liberal party formed in 1918 from the pre-Weimar National Liberals. Its platform stressed Christian family values, secular education, lower tariffs, opposition to welfare spending and agrarian subsidies, and hostility to socialism. Gustav Stresemann was its chairman and it participated in all governments until 1931. After Stresemann's death, the party turned further to the right.
	German Democratic Party Deutsche Demokratische Partei	DDP	Centre to centre-left	Pro-Weimar Republic; Liberalism; Social liberalism Republicanism	A left-liberal party formed in 1918 as the successor to the Progressive People's Party. A member of the Weimar Coalition, it was one of the main liberal parties and participated in several coalition governments.
	Old Social Democratic Party of Germany Alte Sozialdemokratische Partei Deutschlands	ASPD	Centre-left	Pro-Weimar Republic; Social democracy Left-wing Nationalism	A regional party based in Saxony that split from the SPD in 1926. It never gained a mass following and disbanded in 1932.
1920 election poster of the Communist Workers' Party of Germany (KAPD), calling for a boycott	Communist Workers' Party of Germany Kommunistische Arbeiter-Partei Deutschlands	KAPD	Far-left	Anti-Weimar Republic; Left communism Revolutionary socialism Council communism	An ultra-leftist party that split from the KPD in April 1920. They rejected participation in the Reichstag and called for immediate revolutionary action. Immediately after its formation the party endured a series of splinters and lost much of the little influence it had.
The red flag commonly used by socialists, communists, some anarchists, and other left-wing or far-left groups	Communist Party of Germany (Opposition) Kommunistische Partei Deutschlands (Opposition)	KPO	Left-wing	Communism; Luxemburgism; Bukharinism	Split from the KPD in 1928, representing the "Right Opposition" of the Bukharinists against the Stalinist "Center" and the Trotskyist "Left Opposition". It never intended to be a real political party, but to influence the KPD.
Sozialistische Arbeiterpartei Deutschlands-01	Socialist Workers' Party of Germany Sozialistische Arbeiterpartei Deutschlands	SAPD	Left-wing	Centrist Marxism; Democratic socialism	A minor left-wing party that contained splits from the SPD, joined by parts of the USPD and dissenters from the KPD and the KPO joined it. Its political positions were near to those of the USPD, wavering between the SPD and the KPD.
	Socialist League Sozialistischer Bund	SB	Left-wing	Socialism	A splinter party that formed from the USPD in 1922 and merged into the SAPD in 1931.
USPD logo, 1920	Independent Social Democratic Party of Germany Unabhängige Sozialdemokratische Partei Deutschlands	USPD	Left-wing	Center Marxism; Democratic socialism Pacifism	An anti-war party that split from the SPD in 1917. It was a Marxist party that sought change through parliament and social progressive programs. The left-wing majority of the party joined the Communist Party in December 1920, while the remainder reunited with the MSPD in September 1922. A splinter element (Sozialistischer Bund) continued as an independent party, never attaining any real electoral success and finally merging with the SAPD in 1931.
	German Farmers' Party Deutsche Bauernpartei	DBP	Centre	Agrarianism	An agrarian party founded in 1928 to advocate for the economic interests of small farmers and peasants.
	German State Party Deutsche Staatspartei	DStP	Centre to Centre-right	Pro-Weimar Republic; Liberalism; Corporatism; Nationalism	A party formed in 1930 by a merger of the DDP and the People's National Reich Association (VNRV) - the political wing of the Young German Order. The VNRV Reichstag delegates soon split from the party, leaving it essentially the DDP under a new name.
	Hanseatic People's League Hanseatischer Volksbund	HVB	Right-wing	Anti-Weimar Republic; Anti-Social democracy German Nationalism	A regional party founded in Lübeck in 1926, supported by the middle classes opposed to Marxism and social democracy. It was allied with the DVP.
	Schleswig-Holstein Farmers and Farmworkers Democracy Schleswig-Holsteinische Bauern- und Landarbeiterdemokratie	SHBLD	Centre	Pro-Weimar Republic; Agrarian Liberalism	A regional agrarian party active in Schleswig-Holstein between 1919 and 1924. It was a moderate party that leaned towards liberalism, and co-operated with the DVP.
Maltese-Cross-Heraldry	People's National Reich Association Volksnationale Reichsvereinigung	VR	Centre-right to right-wing	Pro-Weimar Republic; German nationalism National liberalism	This was the political wing of the Young German Order and it briefly merged with the DDP in 1930 to form the DStP.
	Bavarian People's Party Bayerische Volkspartei	BVP	Centre-right	Pro-Weimar Republic; Political Catholicism; Christian democracy Bavarian regionalism	A Catholic and conservative party, in 1918 it split off from the Centre Party to pursue a more conservative and particularist Bavarian course.
	Burnswick-Lower Saxony Party Braunschweigisch-Niedersächsische Partei	BNP	Right-wing	Anti-Weimar Republic; Monarchism; Conservatism; Anti-republicanism	This was a small regional party active in the Free State of Brunswick. It was conservative, monarchist and anti-republican. It formed an electoral alliance with the DVP and the DNVP.
	Christian-National Peasants' and Farmers' Party Christlich-Nationale Bauern- und Landvolkpartei	CNBL	Right-wing	Anti-Weimar Republic; Agrarian conservatism German Nationalism	Christian National Peasants' and Farmers' Party. This was a conservative agrarian party that broke off from the German National People's Party (DNVP) in 1928. It contested the 1930 and 1932 Reichstag elections under the name Deutsches Landvolk (German Rural Folk).
	Christian Social People's Service Christlich-Sozialer Volksdienst	CSVD	Centre-right to right-wing	Pro-Weimar Republic; Christian democracy Political Protestantism; Conservatism	A conservative Protestant party formed at the end of 1929, it was mainly supported by the middle class and Christian trade unionists. It supported state welfare, trade unions and workers participation in management; it opposed atheism, liberalism and Marxism. Also known as Christlich-sozialer Volksdienst (Evangelische Bewegung).
	Christian People's Party Christliche Volkspartei	CVP	Centre-right	Pro-Weimar Republic; Christian Democracy	A short-lived Catholic party based in the Rhineland.
	German-Hanoverian Party Deutsch-Hannoversche Partei	DHP	Centre-left	Pro-Weimar Republic; Hannoverian regionalism Hannoverian Separatism; Social Agrarianism	Also known as the Guelph Party. A regional party in Prussia's Province of Hanover that unsuccessfully advocated for a Free State of Hanover. Formerly conservative and centre-right, the party moved to the left in the 1920s.
	German Workers' Party Deutsche Arbeiterpartei	DAP	Far-right	Anti-Weimar Republic; Proto-fascism; Pan-Germanism; Anti-Marxism; Antisemitism; Völkisch Nationalism	This was formed in 1919 by Anton Drexler, with Gottfried Feder, Dietrich Eckart and Karl Harrer, and derived in part from the Thule Society, the cover organization of the occult ariosophist Germanenorden. This party added the adjective "National Socialist" in its name and became the "National Socialist German Workers' Party" (NSDAP) in 1920.
	German Social Party Deutschsoziale Partei	DSP	Far-right	Anti-Weimar Republic; Proto-fascism; Völkisch Movement; Antisemitism	A far-right antisemitic and Völkisch political party, active from 1921 to 1929.
	German-Socialist Party Deutschsozialistische Partei	DSP	Far-right	Anti-Weimar Republic; Proto-fascism; National mysticism Racial antisemitism Anti-communism	A far-right, nationalist party heavily influenced by the antisemitic Thule Society. It was headed by Julius Streicher, and it was also highly organized, despite having a rather small size. In a controversial move, it dissolved itself in 1922 and many of its members entered the (then very new) Nazi Party.
	German Völkisch Freedom Party Deutschvölkische Freiheitspartei	DVFP	Far-right	Anti-Weimar Republic; Proto-fascism; Völkisch nationalism Pan-Germanism; Revolutionary conservatism Antisemitism; Anti-communism	The party of General Ludendorff. It campaigned for an authoritarian regime that would be very nationalistic and promoted socioeconomic questions. It also sought to close the stock exchanges and nationalize the banks. In May 1924, it obtained 6.4% of the vote in alliance with NSDAP, but fell to 3% in the next election, in December 1924.
	Greater German People's Community Großdeutsche Volksgemeinschaft	GVG	Far-right	Anti-Weimar Republic; Nazism; Antisemitism; Völkisch nationalism	A Nazi front organization established in January 1924 when the Nazi Party was outlawed. Centered in Bavaria, it was led by Alfred Rosenberg until July when he was ousted by Julius Streicher. Opposed to electoral politics, it was not represented in the Reichstag. It dissolved in March 1925 and was reabsorbed by the Nazi Party.
	Conservative People's Party Konservative Volkspartei	KVP	Right-wing	Pro-Weimar Republic; Conservatism; Christian democracy	It split off from the DNVP in 1930, following that party's turn to the far-right under Alfred Hugenberg.
	National Socialist Freedom Party Nationalsozialistische Freiheitspartei	NSFP	Far-right	Anti-Weimar Republic; Nazism; Pan-Germanism; Anti-communism; Antisemitism Factions: Anti-Catholicism	A Nazi front organization established in April 1924 when the Nazi Party was outlawed and Hitler was jailed. The remaining Nazis formed it as a legal means of carrying on the party and its ideology. As the National Socialist Freedom movement (NSFB), it ran as a combined list with the DVFP in the 1924 Reichstag elections and disbanded shortly after the Nazi Party was re-established in February 1925.
	Economic Party Reichspartei des deutschen Mittelstandes	WP	Right-wing	Conservatism; Anti-communism; Corporatism	A conservative pro-business party, founded in 1920 as the Economic Party of the German Middle Class. It commonly was referred to as the Wirtschaftspartei (WP). It supported a reduction in government economic involvement, a freer hand for business, and lower taxes. It was particularly opposed to revaluation, which it considered an attack on the rights of property owners.
	People's Justice Party Volksrechtpartei	VRP	Right-wing		Officially called the Reich Party for Civil Rights and Deflation. Formed in 1926, the party was conservative in outlook and represented itself as the defender of savers, calling for the creation of as broad a middle class as possible. It sought to represent those worst hit by the hyperinflation of the early 1920s.

== Smaller political parties, organisations and electoral lists ==
Besides the larger parties, there were also a multitude of smaller groups and parties that were either affiliated with the electoral coalitions of larger parties or were organisationally independent and participated with their own lists either throughout the entire Republic or only in individual constituencies.

Party	Abbr.	Categorization	Stance	Description
General German Civil Servants Association Allgemeiner Deutscher Beamtenbund	AGB	Left-wing		A civil servants' league started by the SPD.
German Agrarian League Bund der Landwirte	BdL			The Agrarian League was an agricultural advocacy group that opposed free trade, industrialization, and liberalism. It merged with the Deutscher Landbund in 1921 to form the Reichslandbund.
Peasants' Association Bauernverein				Peasant association located in Schleswig-Holstein. Without religious ties, it initially supported a liberal economic and political policy.
Peasants' Associations Bauernvereine		Centre		Farmers' associations associated with the Center Party, that were located in the Catholic west and south.
Bavarian Peasants' League Bayerischer Bauernbund	BBB			Operated throughout Germany but especially in its stronghold of Bavaria. It had democratic, anticlerical leanings and subscribed to a narrow Bavarian particularism. It supported the BVP and the DNVP, and in 1928 helped found the DBP. Also BBB.
Brunswick State Electoral Association Braunschweigischer Landeswahlverband	BLWV	Right-wing	Anti-Weimar Republic	This was a regional electoral alliance of conservative bourgeois parties, consisting of the Deutsche Volkspartei (DVP), the Deutschnationale Volkspartei (DNVP) and the Welf–oriented Braunschweigisch-Niedersächsische Partei (BNP), or Brunswick Lower–Saxon Party. It was active between 1918 and 1922 in the Free State of Brunswick.
Christian-Federalist Imperial Electoral List Christlich-föderalistische Reichswahlliste		Centre	Pro-Weimar Republic	Combined list of the Bavarian People's Party (BVP), the Christliche Volkspartei (CVP) and a Hessian party.
Christian People's Party Christliche Volkspartei	CVP	Centre	Pro-Weimar Republic	Combined list of the Bavarian People's Party (BVP) and the Center Party.
Spartacus League Spartakusbund		Left-wing		Originally formed in 1914 by Rosa Luxemburg and Karl Liebknecht, it joined the USPD in 1917. During the November Revolution, it reformed but shortly joined the KPD when it was founded on 1 January 1919.
Workers' Party for the Working and Creating People Arbeiterpartei für das arbeitende und schaffende Volk	AASV	Left-wing		
Workers' and Peasants' Party of Germany, Christian-Radical People's Front Arbeiter- und Bauernpartei Deutschlands, Christlich-Radikale Volksfront	ABDCV	Left-wing		Associated with the KPD.
League of the Unemployed of Berlin Bund der Erwerbslosen Berlins	BEB	Left-wing		Associated with the KPD.
Christian-Social Reich Party Christlich-Soziale Reichspartei	CSRP	Left-wing		
German Employee Party Deutsche Arbeitnehmerpartei	Darpa	Left-wing		Associated with the Christian Social People's Service (Evangelical Movement) Also DAnP.
German Socialist Combat Movement Deutsche Sozialistische Kampfbewegung	DSKB	Left-wing		
Combat Community of Workers' and Peasants' Kampfgemeinschaft der Arbeiter und Bauern	KAB	Left-wing		
Left Communists Linke Kommunisten	LK	Left-wing		
Middle Class Party (Unitarians) Mittelstandspartei (Unitaristen)	MP (U)	Left-wing		Associated with the KPD.
National-Communist-Party of Germany Nationale-Kommunistische-Partei Deutschlands	NKPD	Left-wing		
Party of the Unemployed for Work and Bread Partei der Erwerbslosen für Arbeit und Brot	PEAB	Left-wing		Associated with the KPD and/or NSDAP.
Radical Democratic Party Radikaldemokratische Partei	RDP		Pro-Weimar Republic	A left-liberal party founded by former members of the German Democratic Party who rejected its merger with the Young German Order that formed the German State Party. The party supported republicanism, pacificism and radical democracy. In the only federal election the RDP took part in, it was in an electoral coalition with the SPD.
Republican Party of Germany Republikanische Partei Deutschlands	RPD	Left-wing		
Socialist Combat Community Sozialistische Kampfgemeinschaft	SKG	Left-wing		
Saxon Peasants Sächsisches Landvolk	SLV	Right-wing		An agrarian conservative party that existed in the Free State of Saxony from 1928 to 1932. It worked closely with the CNBL and, later on, the DNVP. It ran candidates in the 1928 Federal Elections, winning two seats in the Reichstag. It would also win 5 seats in the 1929 Saxony Landtag election and retained them in the 1930 Landtag election.
Social-Republican Party (Hörsing-Movement for Employment) Sozial-Republikanische Partei (Hörsing-Bewegung für Arbeitsbeschaffung)	SRPD	Left-wing		
Unitarian Movement of Germany Unitaristen Union Deutschlands	UUD	Left-wing		
People's Socialists Volkssozialisten	VSoz	Left-wing		
National Association of Deserters Reichsbund der Deserteure		Left-wing		Led by Karl Liebknecht and formed before the breakup from the Independent Socialists.
The Steel Helmet, League of Front-Line Soldiers Der Stahlhelm, Bund der Frontsoldaten		Right-wing	Anti-Weimar Republic	Founded in December 1918 by Franz Seldte, this was the First World War veteran's organisation. Officially above party politics, it was conservative, nationalistic and monarchist. After 1929, it took on an anti-republican and anti-democratic character. Its goals were the overthrow of the Republic in favor of a dictatorship and a revanchist program. In 1931, it joined the DNVP and the NSDAP to form the Harzburg Front.
German Nationalist Protection and Defiance Federation Deutschvölkischer Schutz- und Trutzbund		Right-wing	Anti-Weimar Republic	This was the largest and the most active anti-Semitic federation in Germany. Founded in 1919, it was anti-democratic and advocated violence. After the murder of Foreign Minister Walther Rathenau in 1922, it was banned in most states of the Reich and disbanded by 1924.
Harzburg Front Harzburger Front		Right-wing	Anti-Weimar Republic	A right-wing, anti-democratic political alliance of the NSDAP, DNVP, Der Stahlhelm, the Agricultural League and the Pan-German League. It was formed in 1931 to present a unified right-wing opposition to the Weimar government.
Combat League of Revolutionary National Socialists Kampfgemeinschaft Revolutionärer Nationalsozialisten	KGRNS	Right-wing	Anti-Weimar Republic	Commonly known as the Black Front. An opposition group formed by Otto Strasser in 1930 after he resigned from the Nazi Party to continue what he saw as the Party's original anti-capitalist stance.
Rural People's Movement Landvolkbewegung		Right-wing		A farmers' movement, mainly in Schleswig-Holstein, formed in the aftermath of January 1928 demonstrations against trade and tax policies.
Agricultural League Reichslandbund		Right-wing	Anti-Weimar Republic	Also known as National Rural League. It was formed in 1921 through the merger of the two large Protestant right-wing agricultural associations, the Bund der Landwirte (BdL) and the Deutscher Landbund, in order to more effectively assert agricultural interests against the forces of labor and big business. It strove to maintain as much influence as possible for large Junker landowners from east of the Elbe, who were heavily represented among its leadership. Opposed to the Republic, it first was allied with the DNVP and later the Nazi Party.
Völkisch-Social Bloc Völkisch-Sozialer Block		Right-wing		This was a right-wing electoral alliance of völkisch, anti-Semitic and anti-republican groups formed in 1924 during the period that the Nazi Party was outlawed, and was closely aligned with its ideology. It was particularly strong in Bavaria and Thuringia. It disbanded in March 1925, following the reestablishment of the Nazi Party.
German Social Monarchist Party Deutsche Soziale Monarchisten-Partei	DSMP	Right-wing		Associated with the DNVP.
Expropriated middle class Enteigneter Mittelstand	entM	Right-wing		Associated with the DNVP.
German Empire-Anti-Interest-Movement Deutsche Reichs-Gegen-Zins-Bewegung	RGZP	Right-wing		Associated with the NSDAP.
Imperial Party of German National Catholics Reichspartei Nationaler Deutscher Katholiken		Right-wing		Associated with the NSDAP.
German National Citizen-Bloc Deutscher nationaler Bürger-Block	DnBB			Associated with the German People's Party.
Liberal National-Social German Middle Class Movement Freiheitliche National-Soziale Deutsche Mittelstandsbewegung	FNSM			Associated with the National-Social Party of the Centre (Nationalsoziale Partei der Mitte) and Greater German People's Party (Großdeutsche Volkspartei (Liste Schmalix))
Freedom Movement Black-White-Red Freiheitsbewegung Schwarz-Weiß-Rot (Reichsbund der Baltikum-, Oberschlesien-, Grenzschutz- und Freikorpskämpfer)	FSWR			Associated with the DNVP.
Freiwirtschaftsbund Freiwirtschaftsbund	Fwb			Associated with the Freiwirtschaftliche Partei Deutschlands (Partei für krisenfreie Volkswirtschaft).
Greater German Middle Class Party for the dictatorship of the Middle Class Großdeutsche Mittelstandspartei für Mittelstandsdiktatur	GMP			
Craftsmen, traders and business people Handwerker, Handel- und Gewerbetreibende	HHG			Associated with the DNVP.
Houseworkers and Farmers' Party Haus- und Landwirtepartei	HLP			Associated with the DNVP.
Interest group for small pensioners and those affected by inflation Interessengemeinschaft der Kleinrentner und Inflationsgeschädigten	IKI			
Nationalist Party Nationalistische Partei	NatP			
Combat League of those affected by lower wages and salaries Kampfbund der Lohn- und Gehaltsabgebauten	KbL			Associated with the Bavarian People's Party.
Small pensioners, those affected by inflation and those with pre-war money Kleinrentner, Inflationsgeschädigte und Vorkriegsgeldbesitzer	KIV			Associated with the DNVP.
Land League Landbund	Ldbu			Associated with the Thuringian Landbund and the DNVP.
Land League Landbund	Ldbu			Associated with the Württ. Bauern- und Weingärtnerbund (Landbund).
Justice-Movement-Meißner Gerechtigkeits-Bewegung-Meißner	Meiß			
National Freedom Party Nationale Freiheitspartei	NFP			Associated with the German State Party.
Radical Middle Class Radikaler Mittelstand	RadM			Associated with the DNVP.
Socialist Workers' Party of Poland Sozialistische Arbeiterpartei Polen	SAP			
Polish Party Polnische Partei	Polen			Also known as Polish People's Party (Polnische Volkspartei). Associated with the National Minorities Germany (Nationale Minderheiten Deutschlands)
For Hindenburg and Papen (Nationalist Combat Movement) Für Hindenburg und Papen (Nationalistische Kampfbewegung)	HuP			Associated with the DNVP.
Greater German List Schmalix Großdeutsche Liste Schmalix	Schm			Associated with the National-Social Party of the Centre (Nationalsoziale Partei der Mitte) and Greater German People's Party (Großdeutsche Volkspartei (Liste Schmalix))
Community of fate for the German unemployed (Unemployed Front) Schicksalsgemeinschaft deutscher Erwerbslosen (Erwerbslosenfront)	Sgem			Associated with the CSVD.
Schleswig Association Schleswigscher Verein	SlV			
German Peasants' Party (National-Republican) Deutsche Bauernpartei (National-Republikanische)	DB(NR)			
Green Front Grüne Front				An umbrella group which consisted of the Reichslandbund (RLB), the Deutsche Bauernshaft (formerly Bauernbund), the Association of Christian-German Peasant Unions, and the German Agricultural Council. It too heavily promoted the Junkers interest and drove out many farmers.
German Agricultural Council Deutsche Landwirtschafsrat				
Federation of German Retail Business				
Vital Interests of the Unmarried				

== Unions ==
- Allgemeiner Deutscher Gewerkschaftsbund (ADGB)
- Allgemeiner freier Angestelltenbund (AfA) white-collar employee union affiliated with the SPD-dominated free trade unions. (Pro-Weimar Republic)
- Deutscher Landarbeiterverband (German Agricultural Workers' Union) SPD-organized. (Pro-Weimar Republic)
- Deutschnationaler Handlungsgehilfenverband (DHV) (National Association of Clerical Employees) — the conservative white-collar worker union. The DHV leadership did not fully support the NSDAP because it didn't recognize the independence of unions. (Against the government)
- Freie Arbeiter-Union Deutschlands (FAUD) — an anarcho-syndicalist trade union that participated in the revolution in Germany and continued to be involved in the German labor movement in the early 1920s.
- Gesamtverband Deutscher Beamtengewerkschaften (GDB) was a conservative civil service union.
- Gewerkschaftsbund der Angestellten (GdA) was a Hirsch-Duncker union.
- Gewerkschaftsbund deutscher Angestelltenverbände (Gedag) was a conservative white-collar union.
- Reichsbund Deutscher Angestellten-Berufsverbände was a conservative white-collar union.
- Vereinigung der chrislichen-deutschen Bauernvereine (Association of Christian-German Peasant Unions)
- Zentralverband der Angestellten (ZdA), an association of white-collar unions started by the SPD. (Pro-Weimar Republic)
- Deutschnational Arbeiterband (DNAB), a pro-DNVP blue-collar union
- Deutschnationaler Angestellenbund (DNAgB), a pro-DNVP white-collar union

== Other Organizations ==
- Alldeutscher Verband — Pan-German League. A nationalist and colonialist organization whose goal was to nurture, protect and expand German nationality as a unifying force. (Against the government)
- Deutsches Handwerk. German crafts organization headed by Zeleny. Zeleny advocated positions that would improve conditions for the old middle class. It would later back the NSDAP.
- Katholische Burschenvereine. Catholic youth associations that the Catholic Church started in southern Germany to provide Catholic youth with numerous activities.
- Tannenbergbund
- Tatkreis movement
- Völkisch movement (Against the government)

=== Secret societies ===
- Bund Wiking — Viking League. A paramilitary organization founded in Munich in 1923 by members of the banned Organisation Consul as a successor group. Its stated aim was the establishment of a military dictatorship and modification of the Treaty of Versailles by armed means, including provocations intended to incite workers into violence and provide the pretext for a coup.
- Organisation Consul (OC) — An ultra-nationalist and anti-Semitic terrorist organization that operated from 1920 to 1922. It was formed by Hermann Ehrhardt and several members of his Freikorps brigade. It was responsible for political assassinations, including former Minister of Finance Matthias Erzberger and Foreign Minister Walther Rathenau, that had the goal of destroying the Republic and replacing it with a right-wing dictatorship. The group was banned by the German government in 1922.
- Schwarze Reichswehr — Black Reichswehr. Extra-legal paramilitary formations promoted by the German Reichswehr to circumvent manpower restrictions imposed by the Versailles Treaty. Black Reichswehr members were responsible for several Feme murders. Active 1921 to 1923.

== List by abbreviation ==
- ADB — Allgemeiner Deutscher Beamtenbund
- AfA — Allgemeiner Freier Angestelltenbund
- ASPD — Old Social Democratic Party of Germany
- BB — Bavarian Peasants' League
- BdL — German Agrarian League
- BLWV — Brunswick State Electoral Association
- BVP — Bavarian People's Party
- CNBL — Christian-National Peasants' and Farmers' Party
- DAP — German Workers' Party
- DBB — German Civil Service Federation
- DBP — German Farmers' Party
- DDP — German Democratic Party
- DHP — German-Hanoverian Party
- DHV — Deutschnationaler Handlungsgehilfenverband
- DNAgB — Deutschnationaler Angestelltenbund
- DNAP — Deutschnational Arbeiterband
- DNVP — German National People's Party
- DSP — German Social Party
- DSP — German Socialist Party
- DStP — German State Party
- DVFP — German Völkisch Freedom Party
- DVP — German People's Party
- GdA — Gewerkschaftsbund der Angestellten
- GDB — Gesamtverband Deutscher Beamtengewerkschaften
- Gedag — Gewerkschaftsbund deutscher Angestelltenverbände
- GVG — Greater German People's Community
- HVB — Hanseatic People's League
- KAPD — Communist Workers' Party of Germany
- KGRNS — Combat League of Revolutionary National Socialists
- KPD — Communist Party of Germany
- KPO — Communist Party of Germany (Opposition)
- NSDAP — National Socialist German Workers' Party (Nazi Party)
- NSFP — National Socialist Freedom Party
- NSV — National Socialist People's Welfare
- OC — Organisation Consul
- RDA — Reichsbund Deutscher Angestellten-Berufsverbände
- RLB — Agricultural League
- SAPD — Socialist Workers' Party of Germany
- SHBLD — Schleswig-Holstein Farmers and Farmworkers Democracy
- SPD — Social Democratic Party of Germany
- USPD — Independent Social Democratic Party of Germany
- VKPD — United Communist Party of Germany
- VRP — People's Justice Party
- VSB — Völkisch-Social Bloc
- WP — Economic Party
- Z — Center Party
- ZdA — Zentralverband der Angestellten

== See also ==
- Weimar paramilitary groups
- Weimar Republic
- Glossary of the Weimar Republic
- Glossary of the Third Reich
- Weimar Timeline

== Sources ==
- Brustein, William (1996). The Logic of Evil: The Social Origins of the Nazi Party, 1925–1933. New Haven, CT: Yale University Press. ISBN 978-0-300-06533-6.
- Mitcham, Samuel W. (1996). Why Hitler, The Genesis of the Nazi Reich. Westport, CT: Praeger. p. 72. ISBN 978-0-274-65916-6.
- Zentner, Christian; Bedürftig, Friedemann, eds. (1997) [1991]. The Encyclopedia of the Third Reich. New York: Da Capo Press. ISBN 978-0-306-80793-0.
