= Glossary of the Weimar Republic =

This article is a lists short descriptions of terms, concepts and ideas useful to understanding the political situation in the Weimar German Republic.

== Social class terms ==
- Junker – Member of the landed nobility, often associated with aristocracy, and reactionary or monarchist politics.
- Bürger – German term meaning bourgeois or citizen (see also: Grand Burgher)
- Old Middle Class – self-employed farmers, shopkeepers, merchants and artisans.
- New Middle Class – white collar workers; consisted of the service and clerical (bookkeeping) occupations for management, industry and government.

== Political groupings ==
- Kozi – Derogatory term for a supporter of communism or the Communist Party.
- Monarchist – Supporters of the House of Hohenzollern, including both absolutist and constitutional supporters.
- Nazi – Supporter of Nazism or the Nazi Party. Traditionally derogatory but was occasionally used by supporters. Clipping of Nazi-Sozi, itself short for National Socialist. Contrasted with Sozi and Kozi.
- Republican – Broadly advocates for system without a monarch, or specifically for the Weimar German Republic.
- Spartacist – Member of the communist Spartacus League.
- Sozi – Derogatory term for a supporter of socialism or the Social Democratic Party.
- Weimar Coalition – a government composed of the Social Democratic Party, the Centre Party and the German Democratic Party.
- Great Coalition – a government composed of the Social Democratic Party, the Centre Party, the German Democratic Party, and the German People's Party.
- Bürgerblock-Regierung – a coalition governing without the Social Democratic Party.
- Harzburg Front – far-right alliance from 1931 to 1933 between the Nazi Party, the German National People's Party. Der Stahlhelm, the Agricultural League, and the Pan-German League.
- Vernunftrepublikaner – A republican by reason, rather than by conviction.

== Political movements ==
- Arbeiter- und Soldatenräte – The workers' and soldiers' councils formed during the German revolution
- Conservative Revolution – A national-conservative political and cultural movement in both Germany and Austria opposed to ideas such as modernity, egalitarianism, and democracy.
- German revolution – Republican movement to end the First World War and overthrow the monarchy. Some revolutionaries advocated a parliamentary republic whilst others advocated a council republic.
- Räterepublik – Council republic, based on the workers' and soldiers' councils instead of a parliament.
- Völkisch movement – Proto-fascist and ethnic nationalist movement based on ideas such as blood and soil, racialism, organicism, and the ethnic body politic

== Government ==
- Council of the People's Deputies – Six-member (later five-member) provisional government following the end of Imperial Germany.
- German Empire – Another name for Imperial Germany.
- German Reich – Official name of Germany both in both the imperial era, the republican era, and the Nazi era.
- German Republic – Common name for Germany during the republican era.
- Chancellor – Germany's Head of Government.
- Länder – The States of Germany.
- Landtag – Parliament of one of the States of Germany.
- Minister-president – State Head of Government.
- Provinzen – The Provinces of Prussia.
- Presidential cabinets – Series of governments without the confidence of the Reichstag, only able to govern through presidential decree.
- Reichstag – German parliament, members of which were determined by federal elections.
- Reichsrat – German legislative body, members of which were determined by the state governments.
- Second Reich – Another name for Imperial Germany
- Third Reich – A name initially referring to a future non-republican Germany, later referring to Nazi Germany.
- Wahlkreis – Electoral constituencies.
- Wahlkreisverband – Electoral constituency associations.
- Weimar Constitution – The republican constitution.
- Weimar Republic – Historiographical name for the republic. Originally a derogatory term associated with right-wing opponents of the republic.

== Military ==
- Black Reichswehr – Extra-legal paramilitary part of the Reichswehr.
- Dolchstoßlegende – "Stab in the back" myth; the idea that the German Army was betrayed by subversive elements at home; i.e. socialists, pacifists, liberals, and Jews.
- Ebert–Groener pact – Deal between Friedrich Ebert and Wilhelm Groener, agreeing to the army being loyal to the republic, and that the government would take prompt action against leftist uprisings and that military command would remain with the professional officer corps.
- Kriegserlebnis – (Myth of the) war experience
- Putsch – German term equatable to coup d'état,
- Reichswehr – Armed forces of Germany from 1919 to 1935.
- Reichsheer – Army of the Reichswehr.
- Reichsmarine – Naval branch of the Reichswehr.
- Freikorps – Loose network of paramilitaries, made up of reactionary and anti-republican ex-soldiers.

== Symbols ==
- Haukenkreuz – Hooked cross, a swastika variation used specifically by far-right groups
- Iron cross – Military symbol
- Schwarz-Weiß-Rot – The black-white-red tricolour imperial flag.
- Schwarz-Rot-Gold – The black-red-gold tricolour republican flag.
- Totenkopf – A skull symbolising death, associated with the military
- Red flag – Symbol associated with socialist and communist movements.

== Slogans ==
- Freiheit, Gleichheit, Brüderlichkeit – Republican slogan, translated from the French Liberté, égalité, fraternité
- Einigkeit und Recht und Freiheit – Republican slogan, "unity, justice, and freedom
- Ein Volk, Ein Reich, Ein Führer – Far-right slogan, "one race, one Reich, one leader"
- der eiserne Hindenburg – the Iron Hindenburg; Hindenburg was the epitome for solidness
- der Krieg nach dem Krieg – "the war after the war"; the civil war that erupted in Germany after World War I; the turmoil of the Weimar Republic.

== List of abbreviations and acronyms ==
- ADB — General German Civil Service Federation
- AfA — Allgemeiner Freier Angestelltenbund
- ASPD — Old Social Democratic Party of Germany
- BB — Bavarian Peasants' League
- BdL — German Agrarian League
- BLWV — Brunswick State Electoral Association
- BVP — Bavarian People's Party
- CNBL — Christian-National Peasants' and Farmers' Party
- DAP — German Workers' Party
- DBB — German Civil Service Federation
- DBP — German Farmers' Party
- DDP — German Democratic Party
- DHP — German-Hanoverian Party
- DHV — German National Association of Commercial Employees
- DNAgB — Deutschnationaler Angestelltenbund
- DNAP — Deutschnational Arbeiterband
- DNVP — German National People's Party
- DSP — German Social Party
- DSP — German Socialist Party
- DStP — German State Party
- DVFP — German Völkisch Freedom Party
- DVP — German People's Party
- GdA — Gewerkschaftsbund der Angestellten
- GDB — Gesamtverband Deutscher Beamtengewerkschaften
- Gedag — Gewerkschaftsbund deutscher Angestelltenverbände
- GVG — Greater German People's Community
- HVB — Hanseatic People's League
- KAPD — Communist Workers' Party of Germany
- KGRNS — Combat League of Revolutionary National Socialists
- KPD — Communist Party of Germany
- KPO — Communist Party of Germany (Opposition)
- NSDAP — National Socialist German Workers' Party (Nazi Party)
- NSFP — National Socialist Freedom Party
- NSV — National Socialist People's Welfare
- OC — Organisation Consul
- RDA — Reichsbund Deutscher Angestellten-Berufsverbände
- RLB — Agricultural League
- SAPD — Socialist Workers' Party of Germany
- SHBLD — Schleswig-Holstein Farmers and Farmworkers Democracy
- SPD — Social Democratic Party of Germany
- USPD — Independent Social Democratic Party of Germany
- VKPD — United Communist Party of Germany
- VRP — People's Justice Party
- VSB — Völkisch-Social Bloc
- WP — Economic Party
- Z — Center Party
- ZdA — Central Union of Employees

== See also ==
- Weimar political parties
- Weimar paramilitary groups
- Glossary of the Third Reich
