= 1921 Prussian state election =

Weimar Republic state election

- 20 February 1921
- 406 of the 428 seats in the Landtag of Prussia; 215 seats needed for a majority
- Turnout: 77.4% (▲2.6pp)
Party	Vote %	Seats	+/–
Social Democratic Party	26.3%	114	−31
German National People's Party	18.1%	75	+27
Centre Party	17.2%	81	−12
German People's Party	14.2%	58	+35
Communist Party of Germany	7.4%	31	New
Independent Social Democratic Party	6.6%	28	+4
German Democratic Party	6.2%	26	−39
German-Hanoverian Party	2.7%	11	+9
Economic Party	1.2%	4	New
This lists parties that won seats. See the complete results below.
Results by electoral constituency
Government before	Government after
First Braun cabinet SPD–Z–DDP	Stegerwald cabinet Z–DDP

State elections were held in the Free State of Prussia on 20 February 1921 to elect 406 of the 428 members of the Landtag of Prussia. The governing coalition of the Social Democratic Party, Centre Party, and German Democratic Party suffered major losses, losing one-third of its total vote share from 1919, but retained a narrow majority. The right-liberal German People's Party (DVP) and right-wing nationalist German National People's Party (DNVP) made the largest gains, with the DNVP becoming the second largest party by vote share. The Communist Party of Germany contested its first Prussian election, winning 31 seats.

No election was held on the constituency of Oppeln due to the Upper Silesia plebiscite, which was held one month after the state elections. The delegation of 22 deputies which had been elected in Oppeln in 1919 continued in office until a 1922 by-election. The discrepancy between these results meant that the Centre Party held more seats in the Landtag than the DNVP after the 1921 election, despite winning fewer votes.

== Results ==
Party	Votes	%	Swing	Seats	+/–
Social Democratic Party (SPD)	4,295,305	26.26	–10.12	114	–31
German National People's Party (DNVP)	2,957,784	18.08	+6.86	75	+27
Centre Party	2,819,989	17.24	–4.98	81	–12
German People's Party (DVP)	2,319,281	14.18	+8.49	58	+35
United Communist Party of Germany (VKPD)	1,211,749	7.41	New	31 (Note: Including one member who was elected for the USPD in the constituency of Upper Silesia in 1919, but by 1921 had changed party affiliation to the VKPD.)	New
Independent Social Democratic Party (USPD)	1,076,498	6.58	–0.84	28	+4
German Democratic Party (DDP); German Democratic Party (DDP); Landbund	1,013,239; 976,032; 37,207	6.19; 5.97; 0.23	–10.01 –10.23; New	26; 26; 0	–39 –39; New
German-Hanoverian Party and Schleswig-Holstein State Party; German-Hanoverian Party (DHP); Schleswig-Holstein State Party (SHLP); United Lower Saxon State Party; Landeskultur	438,548; 410,312; 27,907; 227; 102	2.68; 2.51; 0.17; 0.00; 0.00	+2.19 +2.02 –0.19; New; New	11; 11; 0; 0; 0	+8 +9 –1; New; New
Economic Party of the German Middle Classes (WP)	192,780	1.18	New	4	New
Christian People's Party (CVP)	14,140	0.09	New	0	New
Polish Party	12,081	0.07	New	0	New
Schleswiger Association	4,720	0.03	New	0	New
Christian Social People's Party	982	0.01	New	0	New
Factionless Party; Factionless Party; List of Merchants and Wandering Tradesmen	934; 906; 28	0.01; 0.01; 0.00	New; New; New	0; 0; 0	New; New; New
Non-partisan	54	0.00	New	0	New
Invalid/blank votes	212,987	1.29	–	–	–
Total	16,357,755	100	–	428	+27
Registered voters/turnout	21,410,148	77.40	+2.61	–	–
Gonschior.de

No election took place in constituency #9 (Oppeln); for this purpose, members of this constituency elected in the 1919 election retained their seats.

Popular Vote
SPD	26.26%
DNVP	18.08%
Centre	17.24%
DVP	14.18%
VKPD	7.41%
USPD	6.58%
DDP	6.19%
DHP	2.68%
WP	1.18%
Other	0.20%

Landtag seats
SPD	26.64%
Centre	18.93%
DNVP	17.52%
DVP	13.55%
VKPD	7.24%
USPD	6.54%
DDP	6.07%
DHP	2.57%
WP	0.93%

=== Results by constituency ===
Constituency	SPD	DNVP	Z	DVP	VKPD	USPD	DDP	DHP	WP
1. East Prussia	24.0	31.0	9.6	14.7	7.0	5.7	5.7	–	1.0
2. Berlin	22.7	17.4	3.9	12.5	11.6	20.3	6.8	–	4.8
3. Potsdam II	21.6	20.4	3.0	19.8	7.2	13.3	9.6	–	5.1
4. Potsdam I	27.3	23.8	2.0	16.3	8.3	12.4	6.3	–	3.6
5. Frankfurt an der Oder	31.9	32.3	6.1	13.0	2.8	6.2	6.5	–	1.3
6. Pomerania	29.4	42.5	0.7	14.1	3.3	4.7	3.3	–	2.1
7. Breslau	39.9	21.5	19.6	8.4	2.5	0.9	5.6	–	1.6
8. Liegnitz	39.7	22.8	8.8	11.8	2.6	1.9	9.4	–	3.0
9. Oppeln	(Note: Due to the Upper Silesia plebiscite, no election was held in Oppeln.)								
10. Magdeburg	41.3	18.1	1.8	15.5	3.9	7.6	11.4	–	0.4
11. Merseburg	10.6	22.9	1.2	14.4	29.8	11.3	9.9	–	–
12. Erfurt	11.0	11.6	14.3	14.3	11.1	17.8	6.9	–	–
13. Schleswig-Holstein	37.1	20.9	0.8	18.2	6.0	3.2	8.8	–	–
14. Weser-Ems	19.1	8.5	(Note: The Centre Party ran in a joint list with the DHP in constituencies #14 (Weser-Ems), #15 (Hanover East), and #16 (Hanover South).)	17.8	2.4	5.3	9.2	37.6	–
15. Hanover East	32.5	9.6	(Note: The Centre Party ran in a joint list with the DHP in constituencies #14 (Weser-Ems), #15 (Hanover East), and #16 (Hanover South).)	14.4	3.8	4.1	4.6	31.1	–
16. Hanover South	40.8	7.7	(Note: The Centre Party ran in a joint list with the DHP in constituencies #14 (Weser-Ems), #15 (Hanover East), and #16 (Hanover South).)	18.7	3.5	2.1	4.6	22.7	–
17. Westphalia North	22.2	10.2	45.5	10.6	5.5	2.6	3.4	–	–
18. Westphalia South	25.0	8.1	29.4	15.6	9.5	7.3	5.1	–	–
19. Hesse-Nassau	31.7	15.9	17.8	16.6	4.2	4.2	8.7	–	0.8
20. Köln-Aachen	19.4	5.8	55.6	9.2	5.4	1.0	3.6	–	–
21. Koblenz-Trier	11.5	5.5	63.7	11.2	2.3	0.5	2.8	–	–
22. Düsseldorf East	14.5	14.1	26.9	14.1	16.6	9.2	4.7	–	–
23. Düsseldorf West	14.3	8.0	47.1	13.5	10.0	3.8	3.2	–	–

Note: shaded boxes indicate the party that won the most votes in the constituency.

=== 1922 Oppeln by-election ===
Party	Votes	%	Seats (Note: Seat tally and seat change correspond to total representation in Landtag. The results of the by-election were combined with the earlier Landtag election, and the seats up for election in Oppeln were distributed to create overall proportionality.)	+/–
Centre Party	207,503	38.11	76	–5
Social Democratic Party (SPD)	80,861	14.85	109	–5
German National People's Party (DNVP)	79,312	14.57	76	+1
Polish Party	51,638	9.48	2	+2
German People's Party (DVP)	42,329	7.77	59	+1
United Communist Party of Germany (VKPD)	41,597	7.64	31	0
German Social Party (DSP)	22,981	4.22	0	New
German Democratic Party (DDP)	15,152	2.78	26	0
Independent Social Democratic Party (USPD)	1,188	0.22	27	–1
Economic Party (WP)	915	0.17	4	0
German-Hanoverian Party and Schleswig-Holstein State Party; German-Hanoverian Party (DHP); Schleswig-Holstein State Party (SHLP)	532; 401; 131	0.10; 0.07; 0.02	11; 11; 0	0; 0; 0
Upper Silesian Catholic People's Party	246	0.05	0	New
Schleswiger Association	134	0.02	0	0
Christian People's Party (CVP)	36	0.01	0	0
Christian Social People's Party	30	0.01	0	0
Factionless Party	1	0.00	0	0
Invalid/blank votes	19,268	0.16	–	–
Total	544,455	100	421	–7
Registered voters/turnout	834,805	65.22	–	–
Gonschior.de

Popular Vote
Centre	38.11%
SPD	14.85%
DNVP	14.57%
Polish	9.48%
DVP	7.77%
VKPD	7.64%
Other	7.58%

== See also ==
- Elections in the Free State of Prussia
- Weimar Republic
