= Timeline of the Weimar Republic =

The timeline of the Weimar Republic lists in chronological order the major events of the Weimar Republic, beginning with the final month of the German Empire and ending with the Enabling Act of 1933 that concentrated all power in the hands of Adolf Hitler. A second chronological section lists important cultural, scientific and commercial events during the Weimar era.

For a chronology focusing on the rise of Nazism, see Early timeline of Nazism.

== Politics and world affairs ==
=== 1918: end of the German Empire ===
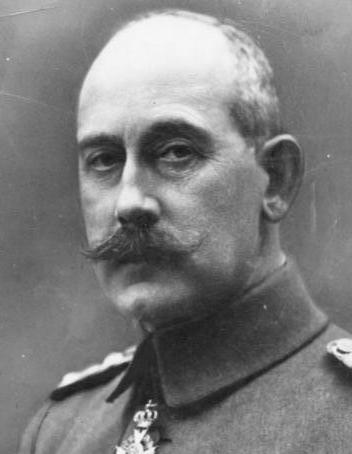
Prince Max von Baden, the last chancellor of the German Empire

- 3 October: Prince Maximilian von Baden is appointed the last chancellor of the German Empire.
- 4 October: Germany asks U.S. president Woodrow Wilson to mediate an armistice based on his Fourteen Points peace proposals.
- 23 October: In a diplomatic note, President Wilson implies that in order for an armistice to be negotiated, Emperor Wilhelm II must be stripped of power and Germany become more democratic.
- 24 October: The naval order of 24 October 1918 commands the German fleet to sail into the North Sea and attack the British fleet.
- 28 October: Ships of the German navy off Wilhelmshaven mutiny against the 24 October naval order.
- 28 October: In line with U.S. president Wilson's demands for a more democratic Germany, the constitution of the German Empire is amended to make it a parliamentary monarchy.
- 3 November: The mutiny of sailors at Kiel marks the start of the German Revolution of 1918–1919 that brought down the German Empire and led to the founding of the Weimar Republic.
- 8 November: Kurt Eisner proclaims the Free People's State of Bavaria in Munich. King Ludwig III had fled the city the day before. He was the first of the German royalty to be deposed.

=== 1918: beginning of the Weimar Republic ===
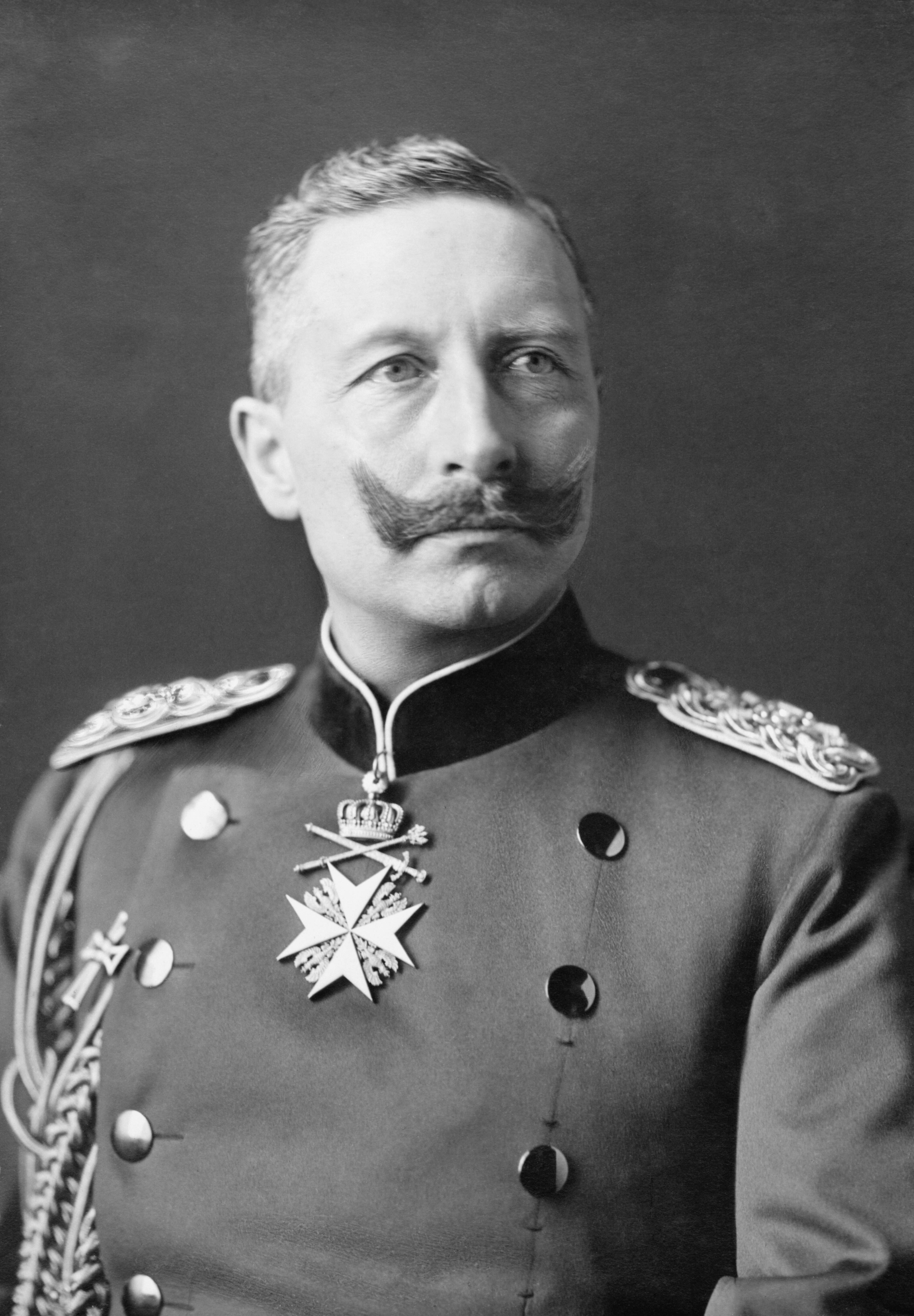
Emperor Wilhelm II in 1902. He fled Germany to the Netherlands and abdicated in November 1918.

- 9 November: Maximilian von Baden prematurely announces the abdication of Emperor Wilhelm II and hands the chancellorship to Friedrich Ebert of the Social Democratic Party of Germany (SPD).
- 9 November: Philipp Scheidemann of the SPD proclaims the German Republic; a few hours later, Karl Liebknecht of the Marxist Spartacus League, proclaims the “Free Socialist Republic” of Germany.
- 10 November: The Council of the People's Deputies becomes Germany's revolutionary government.
- 11 November: The Armistice of Compiègne, which ended the fighting in World War I, is finalized. Matthias Erzberger signs for the new German government.
- 11 November: Emperor Wilhelm II goes into exile in the Netherlands.
- 28 November: Emperor Wilhelm II formally abdicates.
- 30 November: The Council of People's Deputies announces elections for a constituent national assembly that will write a constitution for the new republic.
- 24 December: The fighting between the socialist revolutionary Volksmarinedivision and the German army during the Christmas crisis results in 67 deaths.
- 31 December: The Communist Party of Germany (KPD) is founded in Berlin.

=== 1919 ===
- 5 January: Anton Drexler founds the German Workers' Party, the predecessor of the Nazi Party.
- 5–12 January: The Spartacist uprising between far-left groups and forces of the Council of the People's Deputies, with support from Freikorps units, breaks out in Berlin and is defeated.
- 15 January: Rosa Luxemburg and Karl Liebknecht, leaders of the Communist Party of Germany, are murdered by Freikorps members in Berlin.
- 19 January: Elections for the National Assembly that will draw up a new constitution for Germany take place. For the first time in a national German election women can vote. The top 3 parties are the Social Democrats (SPD), the radical left Independent Social Democrats, and the right-wing German National People's Party.

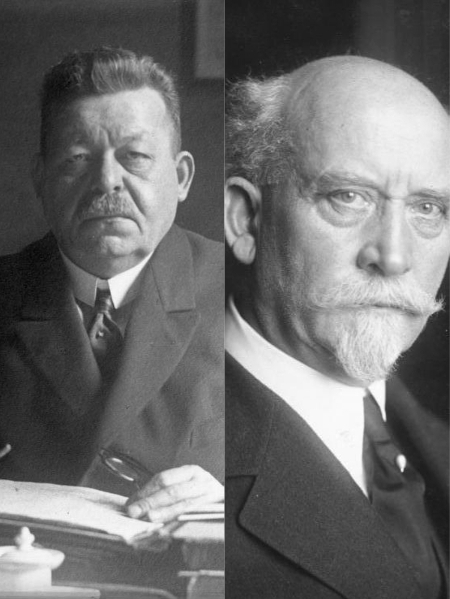
Friedrich Ebert (left) and Philipp Scheidemann, first president and minister president (chancellor) of a democratic Germany

- 6 February: The first meeting of the National Assembly takes place in Weimar, the city associated with Goethe and Schiller that will give the new republic its informal name. Berlin is considered too politically unstable to be the meeting place.
- 11 February: The Weimar National Assembly elects Friedrich Ebert of the SPD as president of Germany.
- 13 February: President Friedrich Ebert appoints Philipp Scheidemann of the SPD minister president (similar to chancellor).
- 21 February: Bavarian minister president Kurt Eisner is murdered in Munich by right-wing student Anton Arco-Valley.
- 3–13 March: In the Berlin March Battles, supporters of the Communist Party of Germany expand a general strike into an armed uprising intended to set up a council republic. The revolt is put down by government and Freikorps troops.
- 7 April: The Bavarian Soviet Republic is proclaimed in Munich. It lasts until 1 May 1919.
- 7 May: The German delegation at Versailles receives the Allies' peace conditions.
- 16 June: The German government receives an ultimatum from the Allied Powers demanding that they accept the Treaty of Versailles or risk being invaded.
- 20 June: After Minister President Philipp Scheidemann refuses to accept the Treaty of Versailles, he and his cabinet step down. On the following day, Gustav Bauer, also of the SPD, takes Scheidemann's place.
- 23 June: Confronted with another Allied ultimatum, the Weimar National Assembly approves the Treaty of Versailles with no conditions.
- 28 June: The Treaty of Versailles is formally approved in the Hall of Mirrors.
- 12 July: The Allied blockade of Germany that had begun in 1914 ends.
- 31 July: The Weimar National Assembly approves the Weimar Constitution, 262 to 75.
- 14 August: The Weimar Constitution, which had been signed by President Friedrich Ebert three days previously, becomes effective.
- 18 November: In front of a parliamentary committee, Field Marshal Paul von Hindenburg implies that it was the failure of the home front that cost Germany victory in World War I. The statement helped give rise to the stab-in-the-back myth.

=== 1920 ===
- 10 January: The Treaty of Versailles becomes effective.

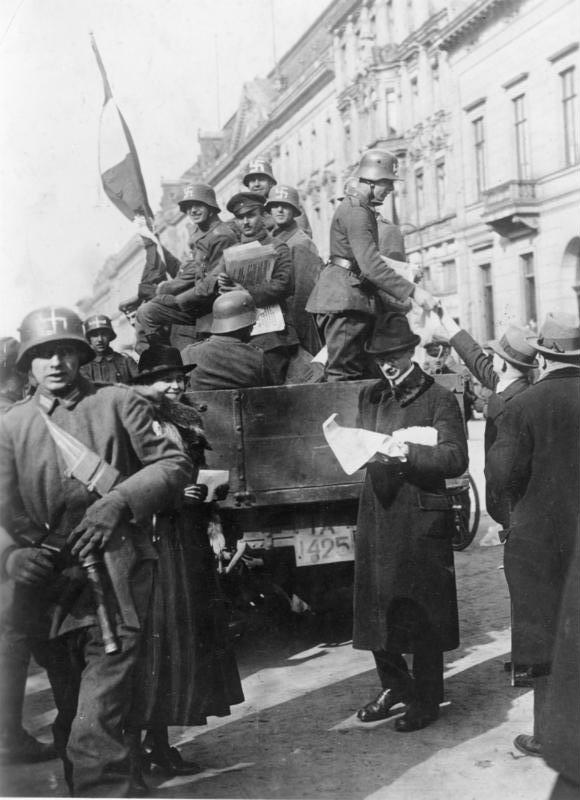
Members of a Freikorps unit with swastikas on their helmets distributing leaflets during the Kapp Putsch

- 13–17 March: The Kapp Putsch, an attempt by a group of right-wing extremists to take power in Berlin, forces the government to flee the city but then quickly fails.
- 13 March–12 April: An uprising of workers in the Ruhr industrial district leads to battles with Freikorps and regular troops in a failed attempt to set up a council republic. Other workers' uprisings take place across central Germany.
- 26 March: The Bauer cabinet falls as a result of the Kapp Putsch. A new government is formed by Hermann Müller of the Social Democratic Party (SPD).
- 6 June: In the first election to the new Reichstag, the SPD again has the highest percentage of votes at 22%, followed by the right-wing German National People's Party and the Catholic Centre Party.
- 25 June: Constantin Fehrenbach of the Centre Party becomes chancellor after the fall of the Müller government.
- 11 July: In the East Prussian plebiscite, voters in parts of West Prussia and East Prussia return large majorities in favour of remaining with Germany rather than becoming part of Poland (92.4 percent and 97.9 percent respectively).
- 19 August: The Second Silesian Uprising breaks out among the dissatisfied Polish population in the mixed German and Polish region of Upper Silesia.
- 1 October: Germany completes its withdrawal from the demilitarized zone stretching 50 kilometres east of the Rhine as required by the Treaty of Versailles.

=== 1921 ===
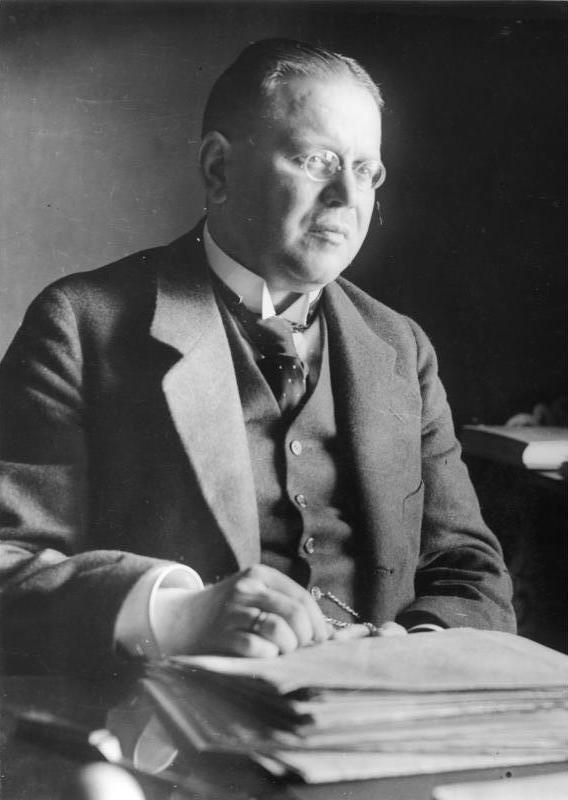
Matthias Erzberger, who was murdered by members of a right-wing terrorist group

- 24–29 January: The Paris Conference establishes German reparations obligations at 226 billion gold marks.
- 1–7 March: At the London Conference on reparations, Germany refuses to accept the terms of the Paris Conference and walks out.
- 8 March: French troops occupy Ruhrort, Duisburg and Düsseldorf in response to the German walkout at the London Conference.
- 20 March: The Upper Silesia plebiscite is held to determine whether the ethnically mixed region will stay part of Germany or join Poland. Sixty percent of the vote favours Germany.
- 22–29 March: In the March Action, the Communist Party of Germany tries to start a general rebellion in central Germany. The Reichswehr violently suppresses the uprising.
- 3 May: In the Third Silesian Uprising, Polish irregulars reacting to the outcome of the Upper Silesia plebiscite of 20 March begin an armed uprising to force union with Poland. The League of Nations resolves the issue by dividing the region between Germany and Poland on 15 May 1922.
- 4 May: The cabinet of Constantin Fehrenbach resigns as a result of the London ultimatum on reparations. He is replaced by Joseph Wirth, also of the Centre Party.
- 5 May: The London Schedule of Payments reduces total reparations to 132 billion gold marks. It is approved by the Reichstag on 11 May.
- 29 July: Adolf Hitler becomes chairman of the Nazi Party (NSDAP).
- 26 August: Matthias Erzberger, former German minister of finance and one of the signers of the Armistice of November 11, is murdered by members of the extreme right-wing group Organisation Consul.

=== 1922 ===
- 16 April: Germany and Russia sign the Treaty of Rapallo that mutually renounces all territorial and financial claims and normalizes relations between
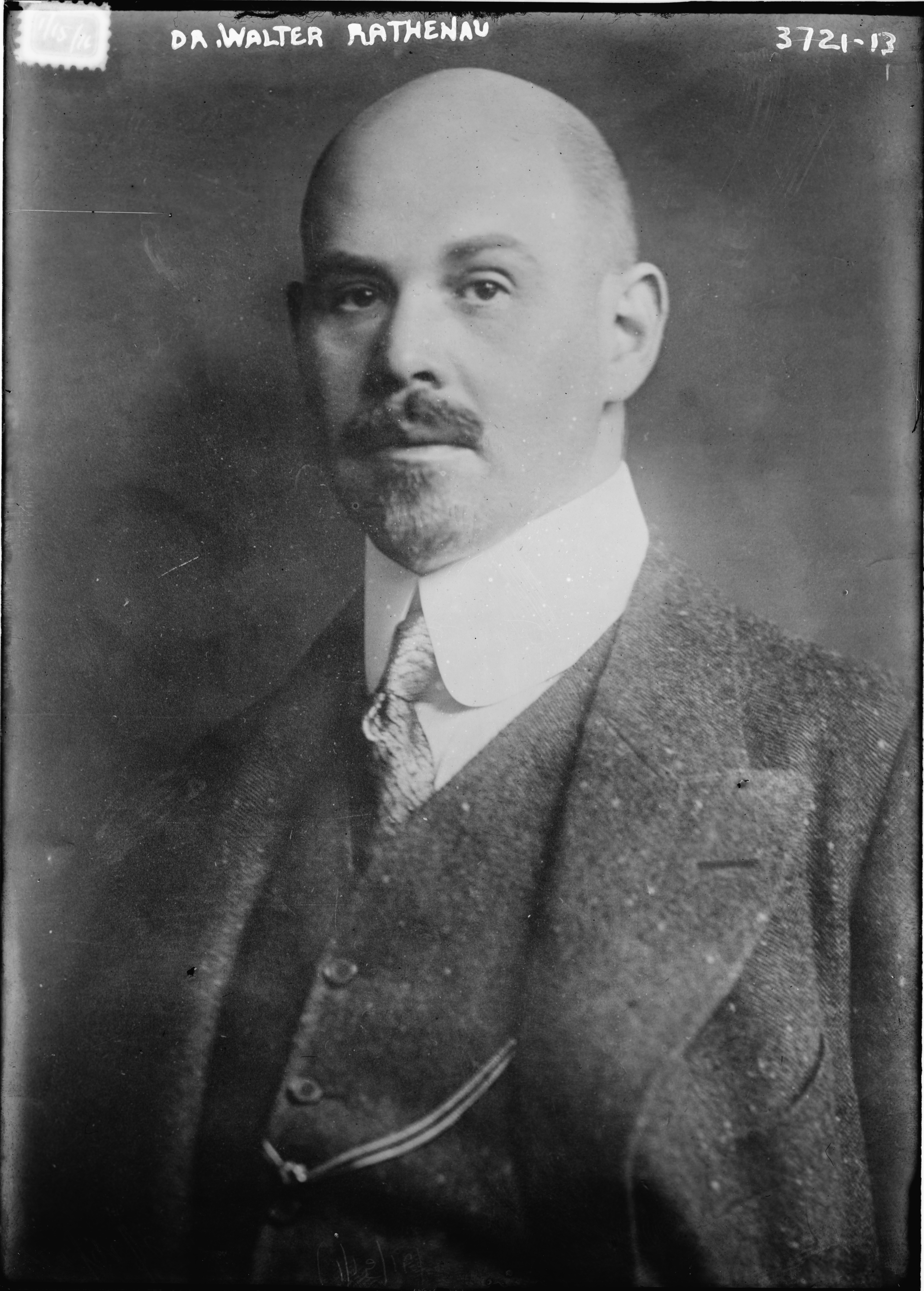
  Walther Rathenau, the German foreign minister who was assassinated in June 1922
  the two countries.
- 24 June: Walther Rathenau, Germany's Jewish foreign minister, is assassinated in Berlin by members of the extreme right-wing Organisation Consul.
- 18 July: The Law for the Protection of the Republic, written in response to the assassination of Walther Rathenau, is approved by the Reichstag. It allows the banning anti-republican printed material, gatherings and associations.
- 18 November: The Nazi Party is banned in Prussia. Similar bans follow in Thuringia, Saxony and Hamburg.
- 22 November: The independent Wilhelm Cuno forms a new government, replacing Joseph Wirth's cabinet.

=== 1923 ===
- 2 January: In a sign of growing inflation, it costs 7,525 marks to buy one U.S. dollar.
- 11 January: The Occupation of the Ruhr by French and Belgian troops begins after Germany is declared to be in default on its reparations payments. Two days later the German government reacts with a call for passive resistance.

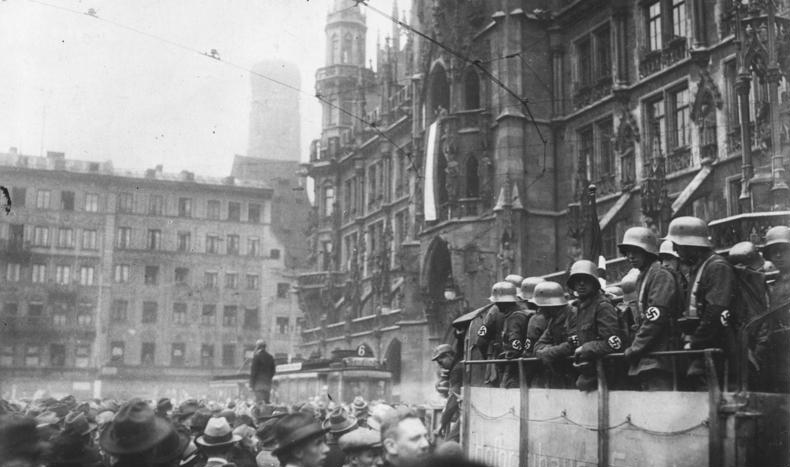
Participants in the Beer Hall Putsch, in front of the New Town Hall in Munich

- 1 July: It costs 160,400 marks to buy one U.S. dollar.
- 12 August: As a result of the Ruhr occupation crisis, the Cuno government resigns. It is replaced by a grand coalition led by Gustav Stresemann of the German People's Party.
- 26 September: The German government ends passive resistance.
- 27 September: Gustav Ritter von Kahr is declared General State Commissioner for Bavaria with executive power. In response, Berlin declares a nationwide state of emergency.
- 1 October: The Küstrin Putsch, a failed attempt by the Black Reichswehr to overthrow the Weimar Republic, takes place in Küstrin, on the border with Poland.
- 29 October: In the "German October", the Berlin government orders the forcible replacement the state governments of Saxony and Thuringia after the Communist Party of Germany joins their ruling coalitions.
- 8–9 November: The Beer Hall Putsch, an attempt led by Adolf Hitler and Erich Ludendorff to overthrow the Weimar Republic, fails in Munich.
- 15 November: Germany's period of hyperinflation ends with the introduction of the Rentenmark.
- 23 November: The Stresemann government falls on a vote of no confidence. The new chancellor is Wilhelm Marx of the Centre Party.

=== 1924 ===
- 28 February: President Friedrich Ebert ends the state of emergency that he had declared on 27 September 1923. It remains in effect only in Bavaria.
- 1 April: Adolf Hitler is sentenced to five years in prison for his role in the Beer Hall Putsch.
- 4 May: In the first of two 1924 Reichstag elections, the Social Democratic Party, the right-wing German National People's Party and the Catholic Centre Party are the top three vote getters.
- 1 September: The Dawes Plan to lower and reschedule Germany's reparations payments comes into force.
- 11 October: The Reichsmark replaces the temporary Rentenmark, which had been introduced on 15 November 1923.
- 7 December: The second Reichstag election of 1924 ends with the same parties in the top three places as after the 4 May vote.
- 20 December: Adolf Hitler is released from prison after being pardoned by the Bavarian Supreme Court. He had served less than 8 months of his 5-year sentence for his part in the Beer Hall Putsch.

=== 1925 ===
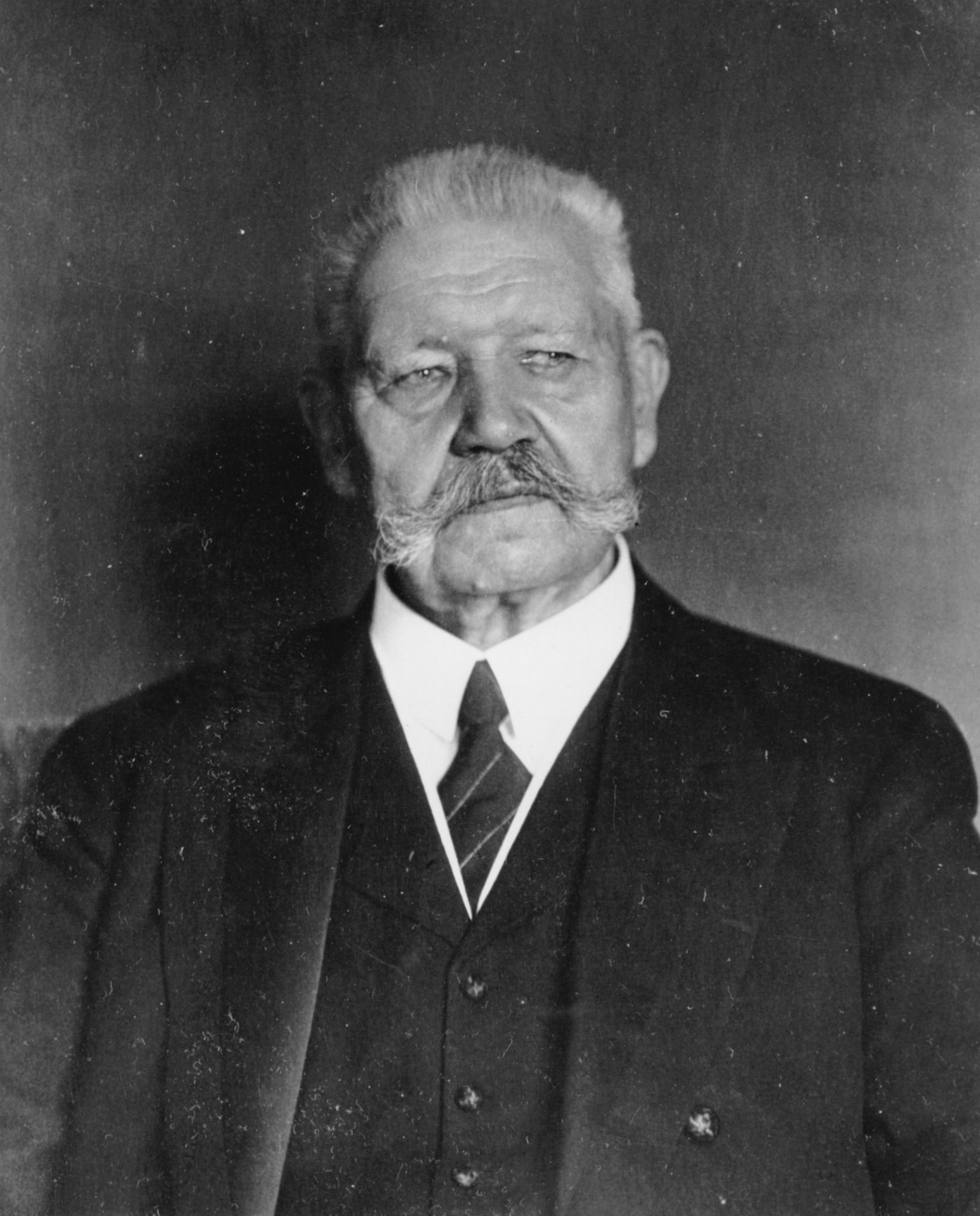
Paul von Hindenburg, second president of the Weimar Republic.

- 15 January: Hans Luther, an independent, becomes German chancellor a month after the fall of Wilhelm Marx's government.
- 28 February: President Friedrich Ebert dies.
- 26 April: Paul von Hindenburg is elected president of Germany.
- 14 July: French and Belgian troops start their evacuation of the Ruhr, marking the beginning of the end of the occupation of the Ruhr that had begun on 11 January 1923.
- 1 December: The Treaty of Locarno, which guaranteed Germany's western border but allowed for negotiations on the eastern, is formally ratified.

=== 1926 ===
- 24 April: Germany and the Soviet Union sign the Treaty of Berlin, which guarantees Germany's neutrality in any war between the Soviet Union and a third country.
- 12 May: The Luther government falls as a result of its support for a modified imperial flag for use at the Republic's foreign missions. Wilhelm Marx of the Centre Party again becomes chancellor.
- 20 June: A popular referendum to expropriate the property of the former German princes without compensation fails due to low voter turnout.
- 10 September: Germany is admitted to the League of Nations with a permanent seat on its council.
- 10 December: Foreign Minister Gustav Stresemann and his French counterpart Aristide Briand receive the Nobel Peace Prize for their work on the Locarno Treaties.
- 16 December: Philipp Scheidemann of the Social Democratic Party reveals that the Reichswehr is secretly working with the Soviet Red Army and anti-republican groups in Germany.

=== 1927 ===
- 31 January: The Inter-Allied Rhineland High Commission responsible for overseeing the Allied occupation of the Rhineland leaves Germany.
- 18 July: A national system of unemployment insurance comes into effect.

=== 1928 ===
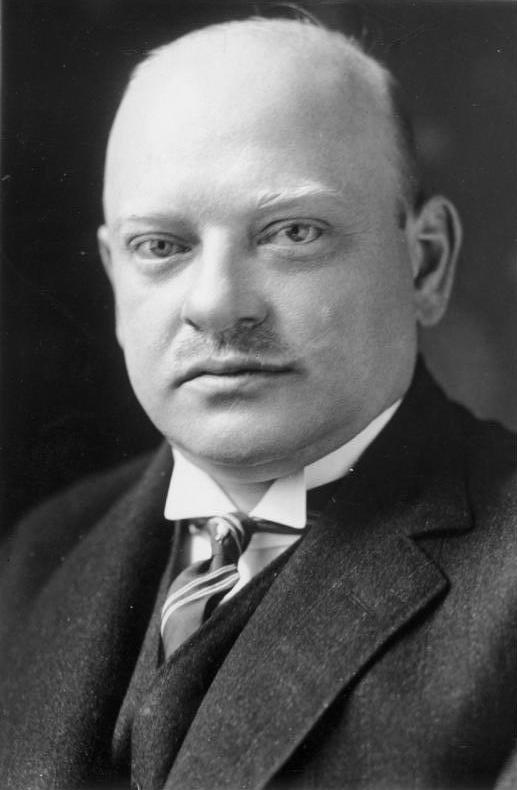
Gustav Stresemann, the German foreign minister who won a Nobel Peace Prize

- 20 May: As in the previous two Reichstag elections, the Social Democratic Party, the right-wing German National People's Party and the Catholic Centre Party are the top three vote getters.
- 28 May: After the collapse of the Marx government, Hermann Müller of the Social Democratic Party becomes chancellor for the second time.
- 27 August: Foreign Minister Gustav Stresemann signs the Kellogg–Briand Pact for Germany. It renounces wars of aggression.

=== 1929 ===
- 1 May: In the May Day Blutmai (Blood May), the Berlin police try to prevent Communist Party of Germany demonstrators from marching into the city centre. About 30 are killed and 200 hurt.
- 7 June: The Young Plan proposes reducing Germany's total reparations payments to 121 billion Reichsmarks, with the final payment due in 1988.
- 3 October: Foreign Minister Gustav Stresemann dies.
- 24 October: The New York Stock Market crashes, marking the onset of the Great Depression.
- 22 December: A popular referendum against the Young Plan, supported by German National People's Party and the Nazi Party, fails due to low voter turnout.

=== 1930 ===
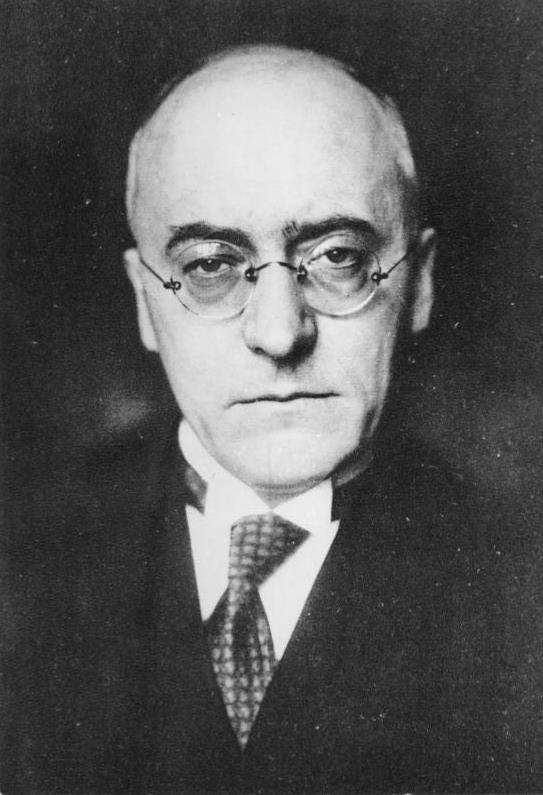
Heinrich Brüning, chancellor of the first of Germany's undemocratic presidential cabinets

- 23 January: Wilhelm Frick is the first Nazi Party member to become a minister in a state government (Thuringia).
- 12 March: The Young Plan is ratified by the Reichstag.
- 27 March: The Müller government falls. It is replaced by the first presidential cabinet, led by Heinrich Brüning of the Centre Party.
- 30 June: The last Allied troops leave the Rhineland, ending its occupation after 11 years and 7 months.
- 16–18 July: After the Reichstag rejects Chancellor Brüning's budget bill, he enacts it by emergency decree, then dissolves the Reichstag when they vote to rescind his decree.
- 14 September: In the Reichstag election, a radical shift among voters puts the Nazi Party and the Communist Party of Germany second and third behind the Social Democratic Party.

=== 1931 ===
- 15 January: Almost 4.8 million workers in Germany are unemployed.
- 11 May: Austria's largest bank, the Creditanstalt, fails and sends financial shockwaves throughout Europe.
- 20 June: U.S. president Herbert Hoover proposes a moratorium on the payment of international debts, including German reparations.
- 13 July: Germany's second largest bank, the Danat-Bank, fails and causes a nationwide banking crisis.
- 11 October: The German National People's Party, Nazi Party and the Stahlhelm paramilitary veterans group form the Harzburg Front with the goal of bringing down the Brüning government.

=== 1932 ===
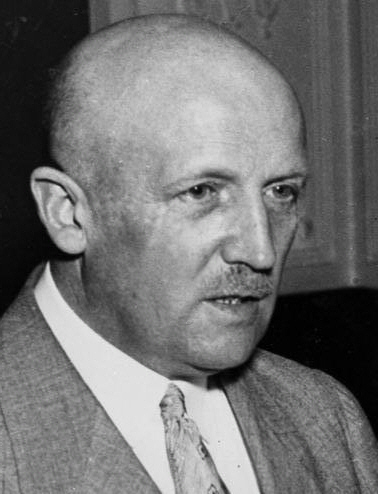
Kurt von Schleicher, who was chancellor immediately before Adolf Hitler

- February: Germany's number of unemployed peaks at 6.13 million.
- 10 April: Paul von Hindenburg is re-elected president of Germany on a second ballot. Adolf Hitler comes in second.
- 13 April: The Nazi SA and SS are banned.
- 30 May: The Brüning government resigns. The new chancellor is Franz von Papen, who resigned from the Catholic Centre Party to accept the office. Like the Brüning government, Papen's cabinet is presidential.
- 4 June: President Hindenburg dissolves the Reichstag and sets new elections for July.
- 14 June: The ban on the Nazi SA is lifted.
- 20 July: In the Prussian coup d'état, President Hindenburg appoints Chancellor Papen Reich commissar of Prussia. Papen ousts the democratically elected Prussian government, which was led by the Social Democrats.
- 31 July: In the Reichstag election, the Nazi Party wins 37% of the votes, followed by the Social Democrats (21.5%) and the Communist Party (14%).
- 12 September: The Reichstag is again dissolved.
- 6 November: In the second Reichstag election of the year, the Nazis, Social Democrats, and Communists are again the top three vote winners, although the Nazi's share dropped by 4%.
- 17 November: The Papen cabinet resigns. The new chancellor, Kurt von Schleicher, takes office on 3 December.

=== 1933 ===
- 28 January: Kurt von Schleicher resigns as chancellor.
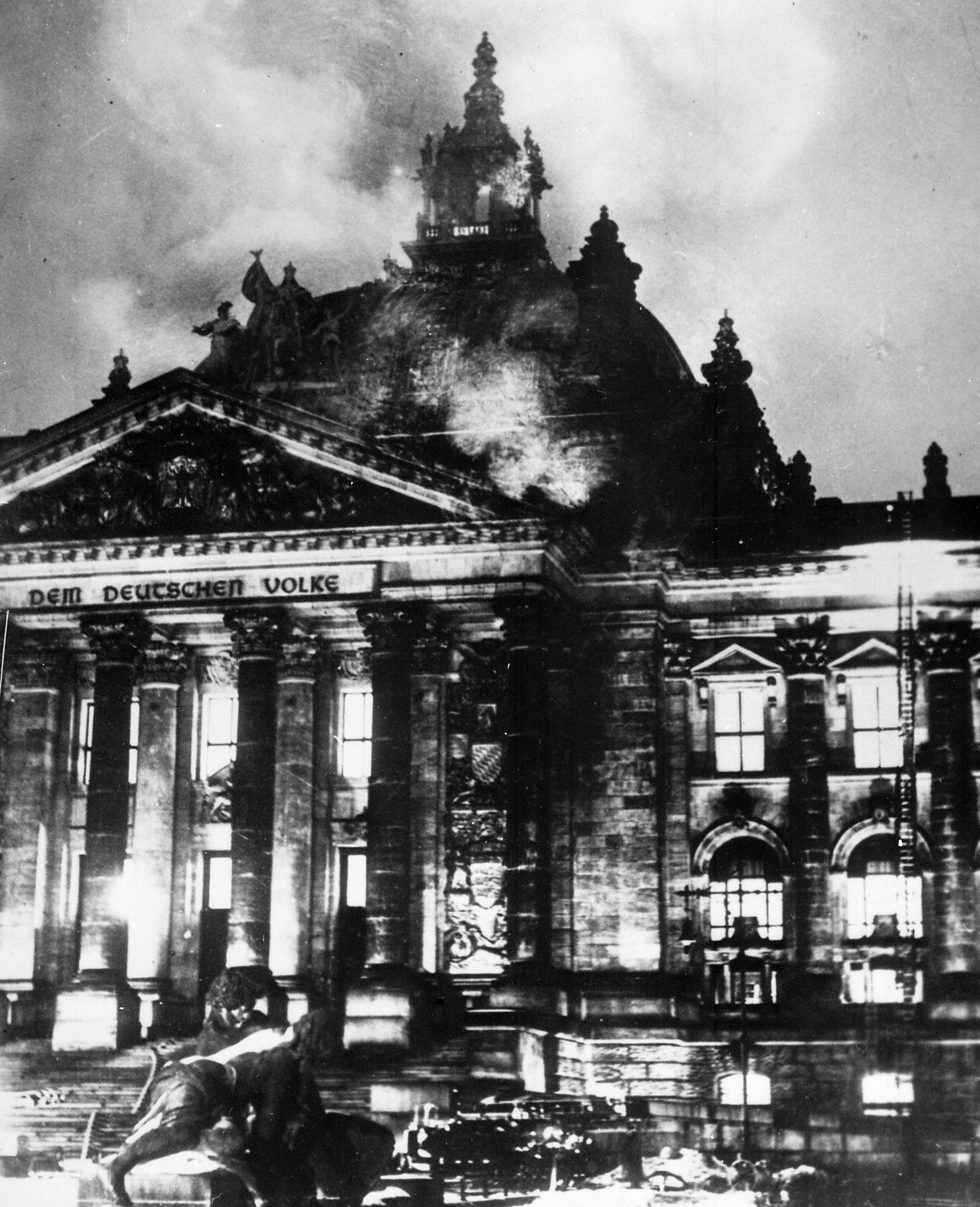
  The burning Reichstag building on the night of 27 to 28 February 1933
- 30 January: President Paul von Hindenburg appoints Adolf Hitler chancellor of Germany.
- 1 February: At Hitler's request, President Hindenburg dissolves the Reichstag.
- 27–28 February: The Reichstag building burns. President Hindenburg issues the Reichstag Fire Decree, which suspends most of the fundamental rights enshrined in the Weimar Constitution.
- 5 March: In the Reichstag election, the Nazis win 44% of the vote, well short of the absolute majority they wanted. The Social Democrats and Communists fall to 18% and 12%, respectively.
- 23 March: The Enabling Act of 1933 passes the Reichstag. It gives the chancellor and cabinet the power to write and enforce laws without the involvement of the Reichstag or the German president. It essentially marked the end of the Weimar Republic.

== Cultural, scientific and commercial ==
=== 1919 ===
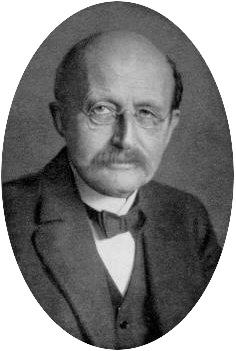
Max Planck, the first of fifteen Germans to win a Nobel Prize during the Weimar Republic

- 12 April: Walter Gropius founds the Bauhaus school.
- 10 December: Max Planck is awarded the 1918 and Johannes Stark the 1919 Nobel Prize in Physics. Fritz Haber receives the 1918 Nobel Prize in Chemistry.

=== 1920 ===
- 27 February: The Cabinet of Dr. Caligari (Das Cabinet des Dr. Caligari), a film by Robert Wiene, has its premier.
- 1 October: The impressionist painter Max Liebermann becomes president of the Prussian Academy of Arts.
- 29 October: Paul Wegener’s film The Golem: How He Came into the World (Der Golem, wie er in die Welt kam) premiers in Berlin.

=== 1921 ===
- 10 December: Albert Einstein is awarded the Nobel Prize in Physics.

=== 1922 ===
- 5 March: Berlin's Primus-Palast hosts the premiere of F. W. Murnau's film Nosferatu: A Symphony of Horror
  The vampire's shadow on a staircase in Nosferatu
  (Nosferatu: Eine Symphonie des Grauens).
- 15 September: Hermann Hesse’s novel Siddhartha is published.
- 10 December: Otto Meyerhof is awarded the Nobel Prize for his research in the field of medicine.

=== 1924 ===
- 30 May: Mercedes-Benz Automobil GmbH is established.
- 27 November: Thomas Mann completes his novel The Magic Mountain (Der Zauberberg) after 12 years of work.

=== 1925 ===
- 25 March: Lion Feuchtwanger's historical novel The Jew Süß (Jud Süß) is published in Munich.
- 14 June: The New Objectivity (Neue Sachlichkeit) art exhibition opens in Mannheim.
- 10 December: James Franck and Gustav Hertz are awarded the Nobel Prize in Physics, Richard Zsigmondy the Nobel Prize in Chemistry.

=== 1926 ===
- 6 January: Junkers Luftverkehr and Aero Lloyd merge to form the Deutsche Lufthansa AG Corporation.
- 14 January: Dancer Josephine Baker performs in Berlin.
- 22 October: Frank Wedekind's play Lulu premiers in Berlin.

=== 1927 ===
- 10 January: The Fritz Lang film Metropolis has its premiere at the Berlin UfA-Palast am Zoo.
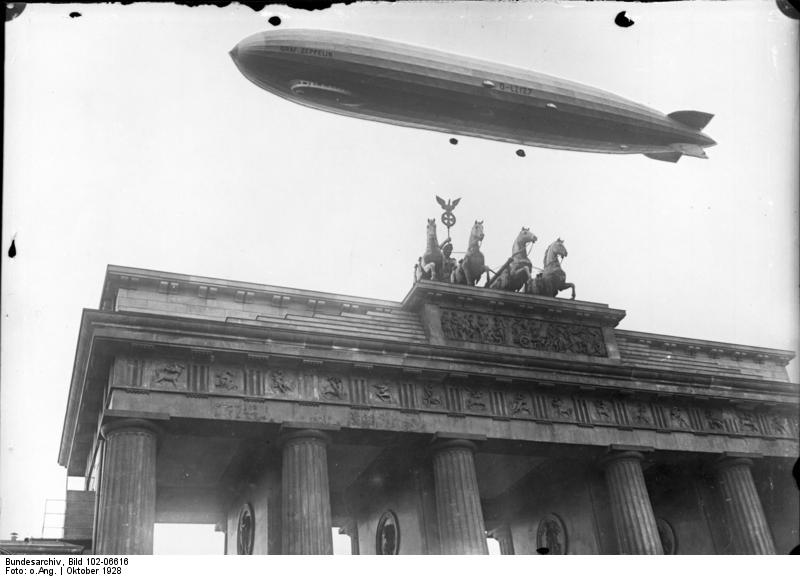
  The Graf Zeppelin over Berlin's Brandenburg Gate
- 10 December: Heinrich Wieland is awarded the Nobel Prize in Chemistry.

=== 1928 ===
- 31 August: The musical play The Threepenny Opera by Bertolt Brecht and Kurt Weill premieres in Berlin.
- 1 October: The Graf Zeppelin airship leaves Friedrichshafen on its maiden passenger voyage. It arrives in Lakehurst, New Jersey on the 15th.
- 3 November: Bavarian Motor Works (BMW) buys the Dixi-Werke of Eisenach and starts building its own automobiles.
- 10 November: The Vossische Zeitung publishes Erich Maria Remarque's anti-war novel All Quiet on the Western Front.

=== 1929 ===
- 30 September: Alfred Döblin's novel Berlin Alexanderplatz is published.

- 10 December: Thomas Mann receives the Nobel Prize in Literature for his 1901 novel Buddenbrooks.

=== 1930 ===
- 1 April: The film The Blue Angel starring Marlene Dietrich and Emil Jannings has its premier in Berlin.
- 2 October: The Pergamon Museum in Berlin opens.

=== 1931 ===
- 11 May: Fritz Lang's film M has its first showing in Berlin.
- 16 December: Carl Bosch and Friedrich Bergius receive the Nobel Prize in Chemistry. Otto Warburg receives the Nobel Prize in Medicine.

=== 1932 ===
- 10 December: Werner Heisenberg receives the Nobel Prize in Physics.

== See also ==
- Weimar culture
- Weimar political parties
- Glossary of the Weimar Republic
- Timeline of the Weimar Republic (Note: click on "Gesamte Ereignisse ansehen" to see the full details for an individual month. The site is otherwise in English.)
- Timeline of the German Empire
