= Prussian Landtag elections in the Weimar Republic =

Overview of the electoral process in the Free State of Prussia

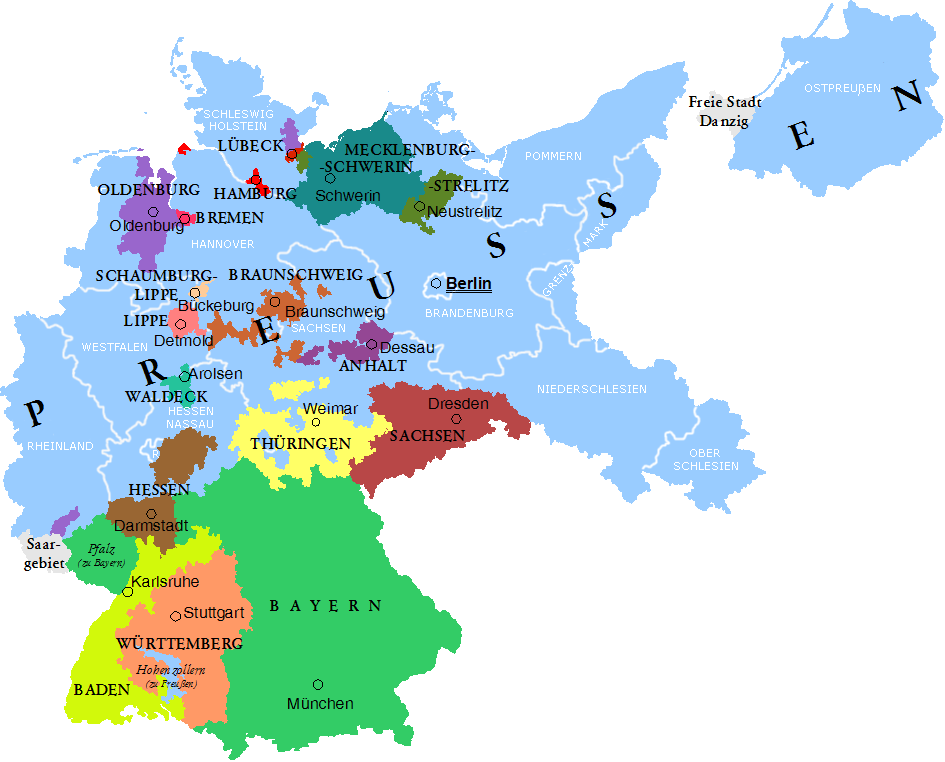
Prussia in the Weimar Republic shown in light blue.

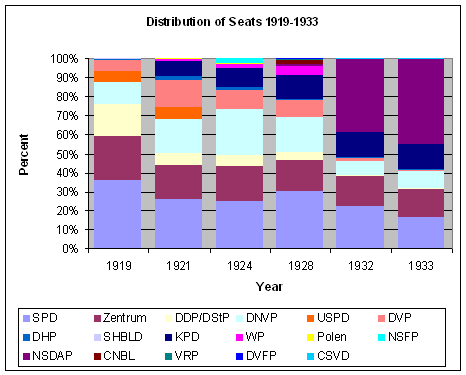
Chart of election results.

The Free State of Prussia held a series of democratic parliamentary elections to its Landtag between 1919 and 1933. As the largest German state by population and territory, Prussia played a pivotal role in shaping national politics during the Weimar era.

The democratic system in Prussia was more stable than in other parts of Germany due to the consistent parliamentary majorities held by the Weimar Coalition (SPD, Centre Party, and DDP), which governed throughout the 1920s. From 1919 through 1928, all elections gave a plurality to the SPD.

In 1932 and 1933, the NSDAP (Nazi Party) won pluralities, generally in line with the rest of Germany. The Landtag was formally abolished following the "Law on the Reconstruction of the Reich" of 30 January 1934, which replaced the German federal system with unitary state.

== Electoral system ==
Elections to the Prussian Landtag were based on proportional representation. A single nationwide constituency was used, with party lists and no electoral threshold (until 1933). The elections were held under universal suffrage.

== Abolition ==
In July 1932, Chancellor Franz von Papen carried out the "Preußenschlag" (1932 Prussian coup d'état), using emergency powers to depose the Prussian government. Following the Nazi seizure of power in 1933, all state parliaments were dissolved as part of the Nazi regime's systematic destruction of federal democracy in Germany.

Prussia was effectively abolished as a political entity in 1934, and dissolved in 1947 by the Allied Control Council.

== Election results ==
Year	1919		1921		1924		1928		1932		1933	
Party	%	Seats	%	Seats	%	Seats	%	Seats	%	Seats	%	Seats
SPD	36.4	145	25.9	109	24.9	114	29.0	137	21.2	94	16.6	80
Zentrum	22.3	94	17.9	76	17.6	81	15.2	71	15.3	67	14.1	68
DDP/DStP	16.2	65	5.9	26	5.9	27	4.4	21	1.5	2	0.7	3
DNVP	11.2	48	18.0	76	23.7	109	17.4	82	6.9	31	8.9	43
USPD	7.4	24	6.4	27								
DVP	5.7	23	14.0	59	9.8	45	8.5	40	1.5	7	1.0	3
DHP	0.5	2	2.4	11	1.4	6	1.0	4	0.3	1	0.2	2
SHBLD	0.4	1										
KPD			7.5	31	9.6	44	11.9	56	12.3	57	13.2	63
WP			1.2	4	2.4	11	4.5	21				
Polen			0.4	2	0.4	2						
NSFP					2.5	11						
NSDAP							1.8	6	36.3	162	43.2	211
CNBL							1.5	8				
VRP							1.2	2				
DVFP							1.1	2				
CSVD									1.2	2	0.9	3
Total seats	402		421		450		450		423		476	

== See also ==
- Category:Elections in the Weimar Republic
