= Lübeck state elections in the Weimar Republic =

German state elections

Elections in the Free and Hanseatic City of Lübeck (Freien Hansestadt Lübeck) to its state parliament, the Bürgerschaft, during the Weimar Republic were held at irregular intervals between 1919 and 1932. These democratic elections were conducted under a system of proportional representation and universal suffrage.

Results with regard to the total vote, the percentage of the vote won and the number of seats allocated to each party are presented in the tables below.

On 31 March 1933, the Nazi-controlled central government forcibly dissolved the sitting Bürgerschaft of Lübeck. The parliament was then reconstituted to reflect the seat distribution of the national Reichstag, dominated by the Nazis. The subversion of democratic institutions was followed by the formal abolition of the Bürgerschaft under the "Law on the Reconstruction of the Reich" of 30 January 1934, which replaced the German federal system with a unitary state.

== 1919 ==
The 1919 Lübeck state election was held on 9 February 1919 to elect the 80 members of the Bürgerschaft.

1919 Lübeck Bürgerschaft election
Party	Votes	%	Seats
Social Democratic Party of Germany	19,556	52.46	42
German Democratic Party	13,528	36.29	29
German National People's Party	2,710	7.27	6
Rural People (Landleute)	1,481	3.97	3
Total	37,275	100.00	80

== 1921 ==
The 1921 Lübeck state election was held on 13 November 1921 to elect the 80 members of the Bürgerschaft.

1921 Lübeck Bürgerschaft election
Party	Votes	%	Seats
Social Democratic Party of Germany	31,073	48.67	39
German Democratic Party (Bürgerliche Parteiliste)	19,834	31.06	25
New Landowners Association	5,083	7.96	6
Communist Party of Germany	4,330	6.78	6
Citizens' Federation	3,527	5.52	4
Total	63,847	100.00	80

== 1924 ==
The 1924 Lübeck state election was held on 10 February 1924 to elect the 80 members of the Bürgerschaft.

1924 Lübeck Bürgerschaft election
Party	Votes	%	Seats
Social Democratic Party of Germany	25,254	34.37	28
Reich Party of the German Middle Class (Wirtschaftsgemeinschaft)	19,506	26.54	21
Communist Party of Germany	8,896	12.11	10
Landowners Party	7,871	10.71	8
German Democratic Party	6,556	8.92	7
Völkische Party	5,402	7.35	6
Total	73,485	100.00	80

== 1926 ==
The 1926 Lübeck state election was held on 14 November 1926 to elect the 80 members of the Bürgerschaft.

1926 Lübeck Bürgerschaft election
Party	Votes	%	Seats	+/–
Hanseatic People's League	32,958	44.44	36	New
Social Democratic Party of Germany	31,851	42.94	35	+7
Communist Party of Germany	4,758	6.41	5	–5
German Democratic Party	1,714	2.31	2	–5
Reich Party for Civil Rights and Deflation	993	1.34	1	New
Centre Party	666	0.90	1	New
Lübeck War Disabled and War Survivors	643	0.87	0	New
Lübeck House and Landowners Association	587	0.79	0	-8
Total	74,170	100.00	80	0
Valid votes	74,170	99.07		
Invalid/blank votes	693	0.93		
Total votes	74,863	100.00		
Registered voters/turnout	87,047	86.00		
Source: Elections in the Weimar Republic, Elections in Germany

== 1929 ==
The 1929 Lübeck state election was held on 10 November 1929 to elect the 80 members of the Bürgerschaft.

1929 Lübeck Bürgerschaft election
Party	Votes	%	Seats	+/–
Social Democratic Party of Germany	33,278	42.39	34	–1
Hanseatic People's League (included the German National People's Party)	27,881	35.51	29	–7
Communist Party of Germany	6,721	8.56	7	+2
Nazi Party	6,347	8.08	6	New
German Democratic Party	2,615	3.33	2	0
Centre Party	886	1.13	1	0
Lübeck House and Landowners Association	782	1.00	1	+1
Total	78,510	100.00	80	0
Valid votes	78,510	98.92		
Invalid/blank votes	858	1.08		
Total votes	79,368	100.00		
Registered voters/turnout	93,420	84.96		
Source: Elections in the Weimar Republic, Elections in Germany

== 1932 ==
The 1932 Lübeck state election was held on 13 November 1932 to elect the 80 members of the Bürgerschaft.

1932 Lübeck Bürgerschaft election
Party	Votes	%	Seats	+/–
Social Democratic Party of Germany	30,331	36.29	29	–5
Nazi Party	27,689	33.13	27	+21
Communist Party of Germany	9,942	11.89	9	+2
Hanseatic People's League	5,008	5.99	5	–24
Lübeck House and Landowners Association	4,137	4.95	4	+3
German National People's Party	3,792	4.54	4	New
German State Party	1,313	1.57	1	New
Centre Party	765	0.92	1	0
Lübeck Pensioners' Association	447	0.53	0	New
Socialist Workers' Party of Germany	159	0.19	0	New
Total	83,583	100.00	80	0
Valid votes	83,583	99.27		
Invalid/blank votes	611	0.73		
Total votes	84,194	100.00		
Registered voters/turnout	97,174	86.64		
Source: Elections in the Weimar Republic, Elections in Germany
