= 1920 German federal election =

- 6 June 1920

All 459 seats in the Reichstag 230 seats needed for a majority
- Registered: 35,949,774 (▼2.3%)
- Turnout: 79.2% (▼3.8pp)
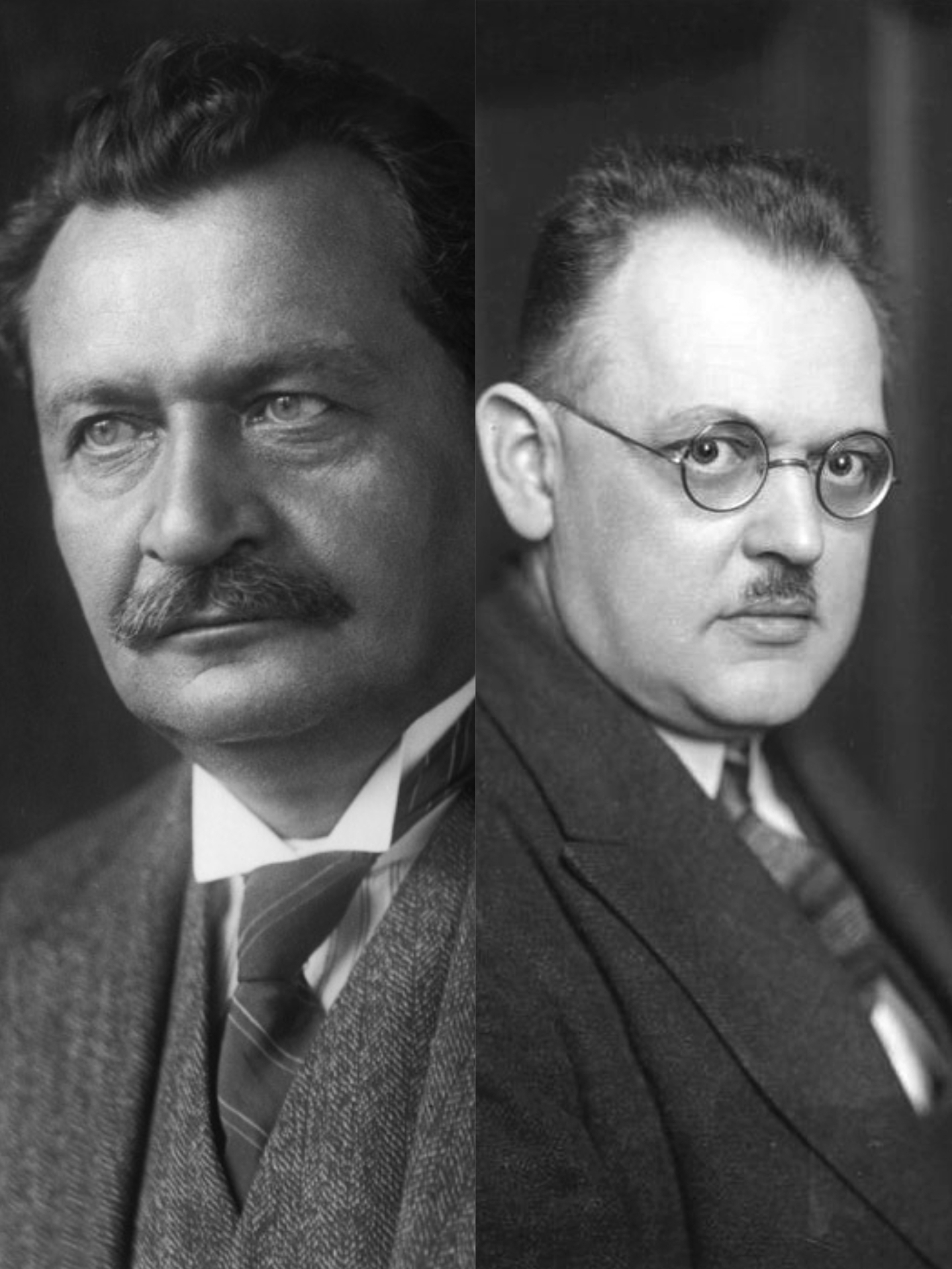

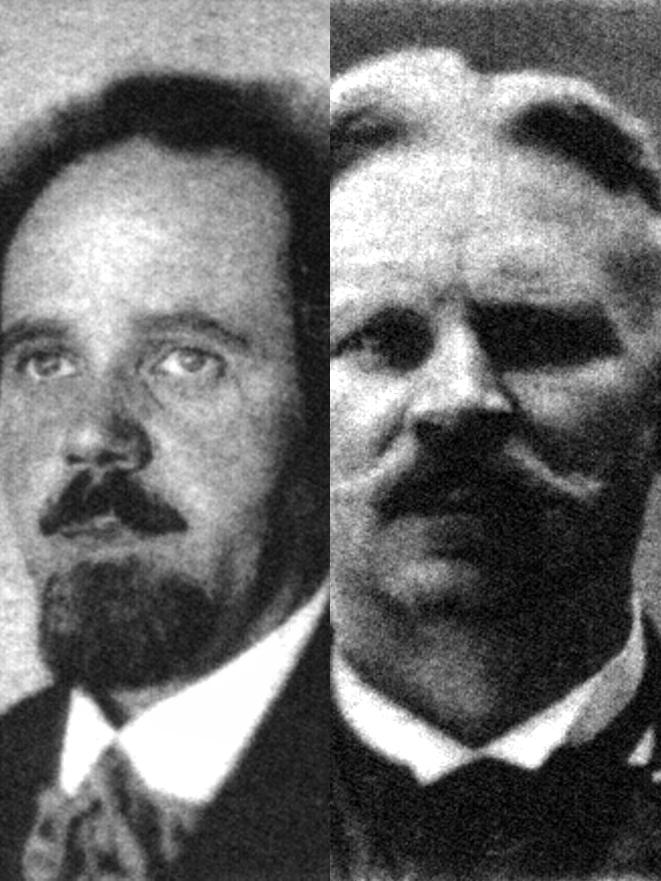

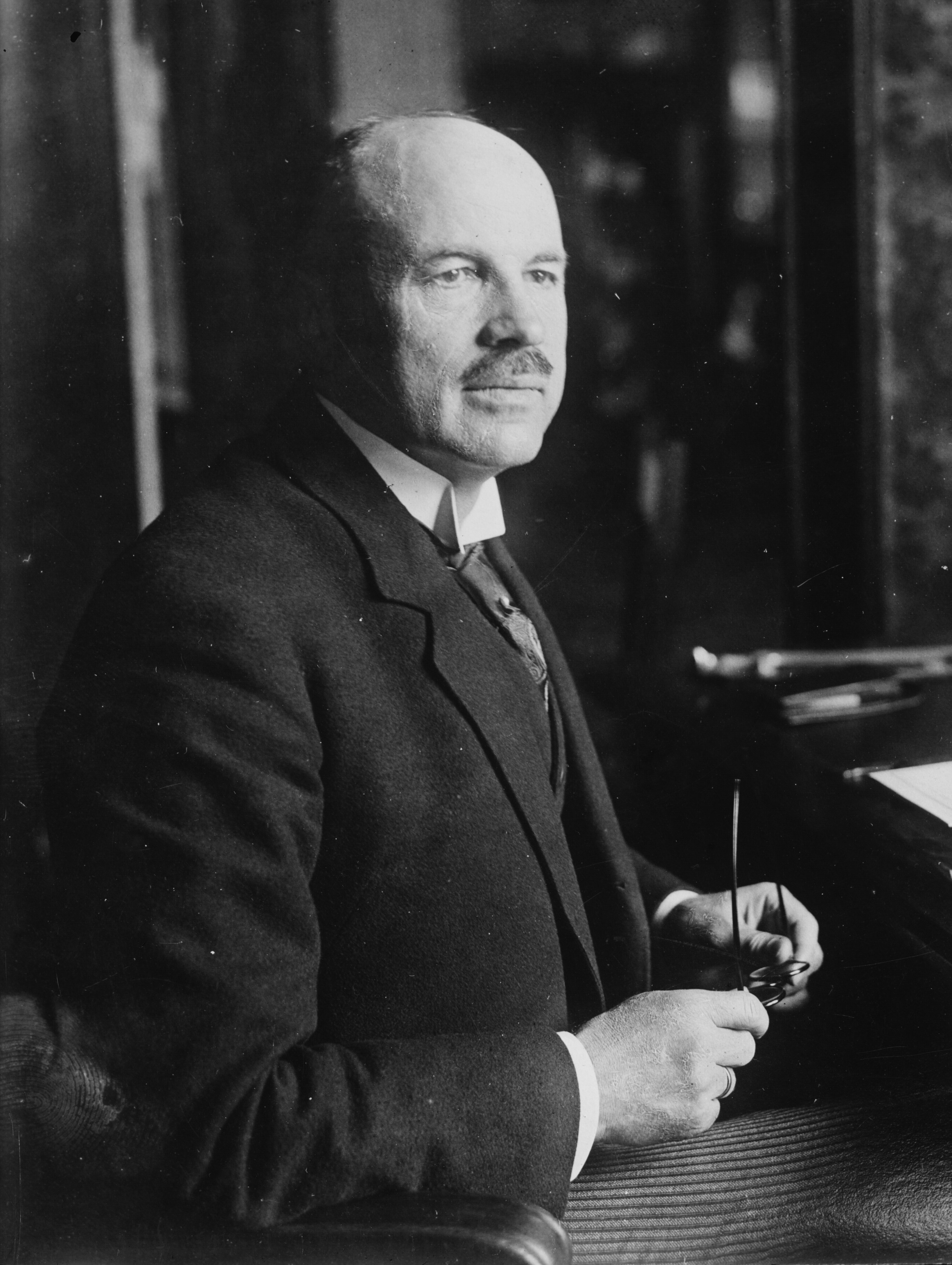

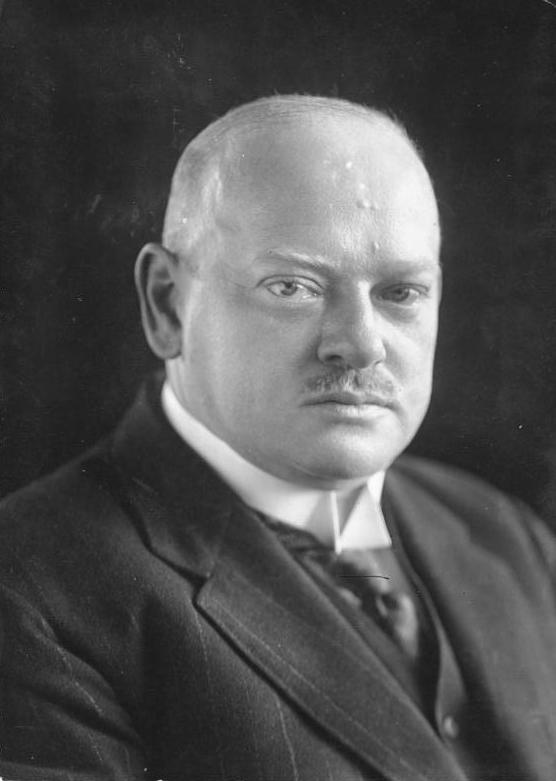

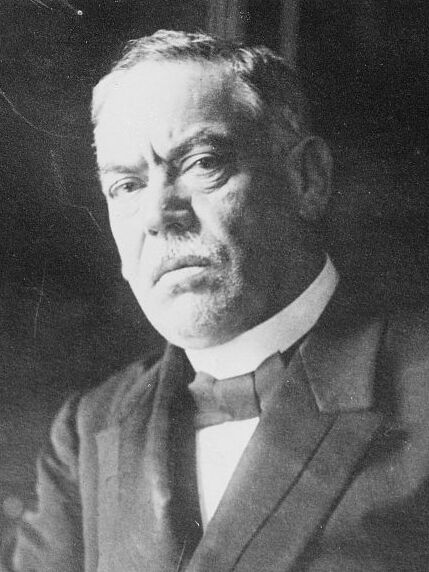

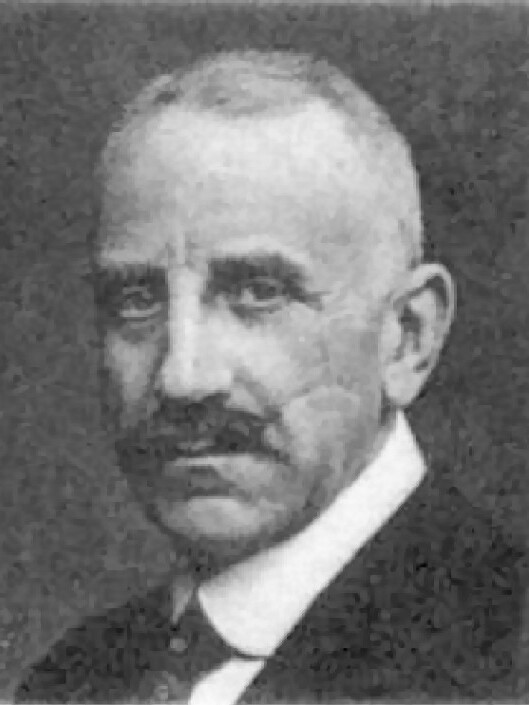
| | First party | Second party | Third party |
|---|---|---|---|
| Leader | Otto Wels; Hermann Müller | Arthur Crispien; Ernst Däumig | Oskar Hergt |
| Party | SPD | USPD | DNVP |
| Last election | 37.9%, 165 seats | 7.6%, 22 seats | 10.3%, 44 seats |
| Seats won | 103 | 83 | 71 |
| Seat change | ▼62 | ▲61 | ▲27 |
| Popular vote | 6,179,991 | 4,971,220 | 4,249,100 |
| Percentage | 21.9% | 17.6% | 15.1% |
| Swing | ▼16.0pp | ▲10.0pp | ▲4.8pp |
| | Fourth party | Fifth party | Sixth party |
| Leader | Gustav Stresemann | Karl Trimborn | Carl Wilhelm Petersen |
| Party | DVP | Centre | DDP |
| Last election | 4.4%, 19 seats | 19.7%, 91 seats | 18.6%, 75 seats |
| Seats won | 65 | 64 | 39 |
| Seat change | ▲46 | ▼27 | ▼36 |
| Popular vote | 3,919,446 | 3,845,001 | 2,333,741 |
| Percentage | 13.9% | 13.6% | 8.3% |
| Swing | ▲9.5pp | ▼6.1pp | ▼10.3pp |
Government before election
First Müller cabinet
SPD-DDP-Z
Government after election
Fehrenbach cabinet
Z–DDP–DVP

Federal elections were held in Germany on 6 June 1920 to elect the first Reichstag of the Weimar Republic. It succeeded the Weimar National Assembly elected in January 1919, which had drafted and ratified the Weimar Constitution. The election took place during a period of political violence and widespread anger over the terms of the Treaty of Versailles. The voting resulted in substantial losses for the three moderate parties of the Weimar Coalition that had dominated the National Assembly. There were corresponding gains for the parties on the left and right which had not supported the Assembly's aims.

The new Reichstag was unable to form a majority ruling coalition and settled for a centre-right minority government. The Weimar Republic's first election revealed an early loss of faith in democracy among German voters which foreshadowed the parliamentary difficulties that troubled the Republic throughout its short life. Of the 17 additional governments before Adolf Hitler became chancellor in 1933, only two (Stresemann I and Müller II) had majority coalitions in the Reichstag during their full term of office.

== Background ==
The Weimar National Assembly, elected in January 1919, drafted and approved the Weimar Constitution and served as Germany's interim parliament. It was dominated by the Weimar Coalition made up of the Social Democratic Party of Germany (SPD), the German Democratic Party (DDP) and the Catholic Centre Party. The Assembly initially planned to hold the election for the first Weimar Reichstag in the fall of 1920, after the plebiscites required by the Treaty of Versailles had been held. They were to determine whether the people in a number of border regions wanted to stay in Germany. The plebiscites affected primarily parts of East Prussia and Upper Silesia which had large Polish-speaking communities, plus Schleswig, on the border with Denmark.

After the failure of the right-wing Kapp Putsch of March 1920, the cabinet of Chancellor Hermann Müller of the SPD, under pressure from the political right, agreed to move the election to 6 June. Due to the territorial plebiscites, the election was not held in Schleswig-Holstein and East Prussia until 20 February 1921, and in Upper Silesia (Oppeln) until 19 November 1922.

Two major factors affected the political climate in Germany in the period leading up to the elections. One was the political violence that had broken out sporadically since late 1918 and the SPD-led government's response to it. The SPD's left wing and the Independent Social Democrats (USPD) were angry at the SPD leadership for its restrained reaction to the Kapp Putsch, especially when compared to its forceful and bloody responses to the 1918 Christmas crisis, the Spartacist uprising of early 1919 and the post-Kapp Ruhr uprising, all of which had left-wing roots. Supporters of the parties of the centre and right, on the other hand, wanted protection from a feared communist revolution and a return to public order.

The second factor was the Treaty of Versailles, which the majority of Germans thought was excessively harsh, punitive and an insult to the country. The USPD, SPD and Centre parties had voted in the National Assembly to accept the treaty, and the parties of the right condemned them for it so. Following the announcement of the treaty's terms in May 1919, the political atmosphere in Germany quickly polarized.

== Electoral system ==
The Reichstag was elected via party list proportional representation. For this purpose, the country was divided into 35 multi-member electoral districts. A party was entitled to a seat for every 60,000 votes won. This was calculated via a three-step process on the constituency level, an intermediate level which combined multiple constituencies, and finally nationwide, where all parties' excess votes were combined. In the third nationwide step, parties could not be awarded more seats than they had already won on the two lower constituency levels. Due to the fixed number of votes per seat, the size of the Reichstag fluctuated between elections based on the number of voters.

The voting age was 20 years. People who were incapacitated according to the Civil Code, who were under guardianship or provisional guardianship, or who had lost their civil rights after a criminal court ruling were not eligible to vote.

== Results ==
The parties of the Weimar Coalition suffered major losses to opposing parties on the left and right and together won just 44% of the vote. The Independent Social Democrats emerged as the second-largest party behind the SPD. The right-wing nationalist German National People's Party (DNVP) and conservative German People's Party (DVP) placed third and fourth, ahead of the Centre and DDP. A total of ten parties won seats, including the Bavarian People's Party (BVP), which had split from the Centre Party and took a more right-wing course, and the Communist Party of Germany (KPD), which remained marginal with 2% of the vote and 4 seats. Voter turnout was 79.2%, down four percentage points from January 1919.

| Party | Votes | % | ± | Seats | ± |
|---|---|---|---|---|---|
| Social Democratic Party | 6,179,991 | 21.92 | −15.94 | 103 | −62 |
| Independent Social Democratic Party | 4,971,220 | 17.63 | +10.01 | 83 | +61 |
| German National People's Party | 4,249,100 | 15.07 | +4.80 | 71 | +27 |
| German People's Party | 3,919,446 | 13.90 | +9.47 | 65 | +46 |
| Centre Party | 3,845,001 | 13.64 | −6.03 | 64 | −27 |
| German Democratic Party | 2,333,741 | 8.28 | −10.28 | 39 | −36 |
| Bavarian People's Party | 1,173,344 | 4.16 | New | 20 | New |
| Communist Party of Germany | 589,454 | 2.09 | New | 4 | New |
| German-Hanoverian Party | 319,108 | 1.13 | +0.88 | 5 | +4 |
| Bavarian Peasants' League | 218,596 | 0.78 | −0.13 | 4 | 0 |
| Poland Party | 89,228 | 0.32 | New | 0 | New |
| German Economic League for City and Country | 88,800 | 0.31 | New | 0 | New |
| Christian People's Party | 65,260 | 0.23 | New | 1 | New |
| Polish Catholic Party of Upper Silesia | 51,437 | 0.18 | New | 0 | New |
| Schleswig-Holstein State Party | 25,907 | 0.09 | New | 0 | New |
| German Social Party | 22,958 | 0.08 | New | 0 | New |
| German Middle Class Party | 21,255 | 0.08 | New | 0 | New |
| Wendish People's Party | 8,050 | 0.03 | New | 0 | New |
| German Socialist Party | 7,186 | 0.03 | New | 0 | New |
| Reform Group | 6,832 | 0.02 | New | 0 | New |
| Schleswig Club | 4,966 | 0.02 | New | 0 | New |
| National Democratic People's Party | 4,015 | 0.01 | New | 0 | New |
| Christian Social People's Party | 1,219 | 0.00 | New | 0 | New |
| Independent Party | 169 | 0.00 | New | 0 | New |
| German Economy and Labour Party | 43 | 0.00 | New | 0 | New |
| Upper Silesian Catholic People's Party | 6 | 0.00 | New | 0 | New |
| Total | 28,196,332 | 100.00 | – | 459 | +36 |
| Valid votes | 28,196,332 | 99.06 | | | |
| Invalid/blank votes | 267,249 | 0.94 | | | |
| Total votes | 28,463,581 | 100.00 | | | |
| Registered voters/turnout | 35,949,774 | 79.18 | | | |
Source: Gonschior.de

=== East Prussia and Schleswig-Holstein ===
The 1919 election results were amended by the voting in the East Prussia and Schleswig-Holstein constituencies on 20 February 1921.

| Party | East Prussia | | Schleswig-Holstein | | Seats | +/– |
| Party | Votes | % | Votes | % | Seats | +/– |
|---|---|---|---|---|---|---|
| Social Democratic Party | 228,872 | 23.88 | 257,839 | 37.33 | 108 | –5 |
| Independent Social Democratic Party | 53,118 | 5.54 | 20,701 | 3.00 | 83 | +2 |
| German National People's Party | 296,229 | 30.91 | 141,410 | 20.48 | 65 | +5 |
| German People's Party | 144,254 | 15.05 | 127,346 | 18.44 | 65 | +5 |
| Centre Party | 91,439 | 9.54 | 5,572 | 0.81 | 68 | +1 |
| German Democratic Party | 53,861 | 5.62 | 65,062 | 9.42 | 40 | –4 |
| Communist Party | 68,450 | 7.14 | 41,839 | 6.06 | 4 | +2 |
| Polish People's Party | 12,663 | 1.32 | – | | 0 | – |
| Schleswig-Holstein State Party | – | | 25,907 | 3.75 | 0 | – |
| German Middle-Class Party | 9,346 | 0.98 | – | | 0 | – |
| Schleswig Club | – | | 4,966 | 0.72 | 0 | – |
| Total | 958,232 | 100.00 | 690,642 | 100.00 | 469 | +3 |
| Blank/invalid | 31,078 | 3.14 | 38,687 | 5.30 | | |
| Total votes | 989,310 | 100.00 | 729,329 | 100.00 | | |
| Registered voters/turnout | 1,251,161 | 79.07 | 931,787 | 78.27 | | |

=== Upper Silesia ===
The results of the previous elections were again amended by the voting in the Oppeln electoral district of Upper Silesia on 19 November 1922.

| Party | Votes | % | Seats | +/– |
|---|---|---|---|---|
| Social Democratic Party | 75,593 | 14.78 | 103 | –5 |
| German National People's Party | 70,841 | 13.85 | 65 | 0 |
| German People's Party | 36,560 | 7.15 | 65 | 0 |
| Centre Party | 205,237 | 40.12 | 64 | –4 |
| German Democratic Party | 11,874 | 2.32 | 39 | –1 |
| Communist Party | 37,120 | 7.26 | 4 | 0 |
| Polish Catholic Party of Upper Silesia | 51,437 | 10.05 | 0 | – |
| German Social Party | 22,958 | 4.49 | 0 | – |
| Total | 511,620 | 100.00 | 459 | –10 |
| Blank/invalid | 3,493 | 0.68 | | |
| Total votes | 515,113 | 100.00 | | |
| Registered voters/turnout | 742,071 | 69.42 | | |

== Analysis ==
Most of the voters that the SPD lost went to the USPD; the DDP's losses were primarily to the DVP. The SPD suffered especially in the large cities, although a considerable number of East Prussian agricultural labourers who had voted for the SPD in 1919 flipped to the DNVP in the delayed 1921 election. Many 1919 DDP voters moved to the DVP in 1920, viewing it as insurance against a potential socialist division of property. The DVP's slogan in the election had been "Only the DVP will free us from red chains". Historian Heinrich August Winkler summed up the election in the following words:

The essence of what the first Reichstag election made visible was a shift to the left among the workers and a shift to the right among the middle class. Politically, the forces that had not supported the class compromise on which Weimar was based were rewarded. The moderates on both sides were punished for what they had or had not achieved since the beginning of 1919: on the left, the governments of the Weimar coalition were blamed for allowing the forces of reaction to regain strength; on the right, the previous majority was blamed for everything that had violated national honour and affected property interests.

== Aftermath ==
There was not a majority in the Reichstag among either the parties of the right or the left. President Friedrich Ebert first asked Chancellor Hermann Müller of the SPD to form a new cabinet, and when he was unsuccessful turned to the DVP, which was also unable to put together a coalition. On 14 June Ebert asked the Centre Party to make the attempt. It reached an agreement with the DDP and DVP to form a three-party minority government that the SPD was willing to tolerate. On 25 June, Constatin Fehrenbach of the Centre Party formally became the new chancellor of Germany and announced his cabinet. Like many in the Centre Party, Fehrenbach had accepted the new republic as a fact but had little enthusiasm for it. The epithet "a republic without republicans" was first used during his term of office, which lasted only ten and a half months. Even so, it stayed in office longer than the average of the twenty cabinets considered part of the Weimar Republic. That was 239 days, or just under eight months.
