= Christian People's Party (Germany, 1920) =

Political party in Weimar Germany

The Christian People's Party (German: Christliche Volkspartei, CVP) was a political party in Weimar Germany. A Catholic party, it was mainly based in the Rhineland area of western Germany.

== History ==
An idea to create a nondenominational Christian party was floated in 1918, with Christian trade unions driving an unsuccessful attempt to rename the Centre Party into Christian People's Party.

The Christian People's Party was founded on 3 May 1920, as a split from the Centre Party, which had contested the 1919 elections as the "Christian People's Party". Bernhard Deermann was appointed as the party's chairman. The new party contested the 1920 federal elections in an alliance with the Bavarian People's Party known as the Christian Federalist Imperial Election List (German: Christlich-föderalistische Reichswahlliste), and was partially blamed for the votes lost by the Centre party. The CVP received around 65,000 votes, mostly in the Centre strongholds of Aachen, Cologne Düsseldorf, Koblenz and Trier, winning one seat, taken by Deerman.

The Christian People's Party also contested the 1921 Prussian state election, but failed to win a seat after receiving 0.1% of the vote.

== Sources ==
- Simon, Carina (2016). Heinz Brauweiler Eine politische Biographie im Zeichen des antidemokratischen Denkens (PDF) (Dr. phil. thesis) (in German). Universität Kassel.
- Dill, Marshall (1954). "The Christian Trade Unions During the Last Years of Imperial Germany and the First Months of the Weimar Republic". Review of Social Economy. 12 (2). Taylor & Francis, Ltd.: 89–109. doi:10.1080/00346765400000024. ISSN 0034-6764. JSTOR 29767502.
