= German Socialist Party =

Political party

German Socialist Party Deutschsozialistische Partei
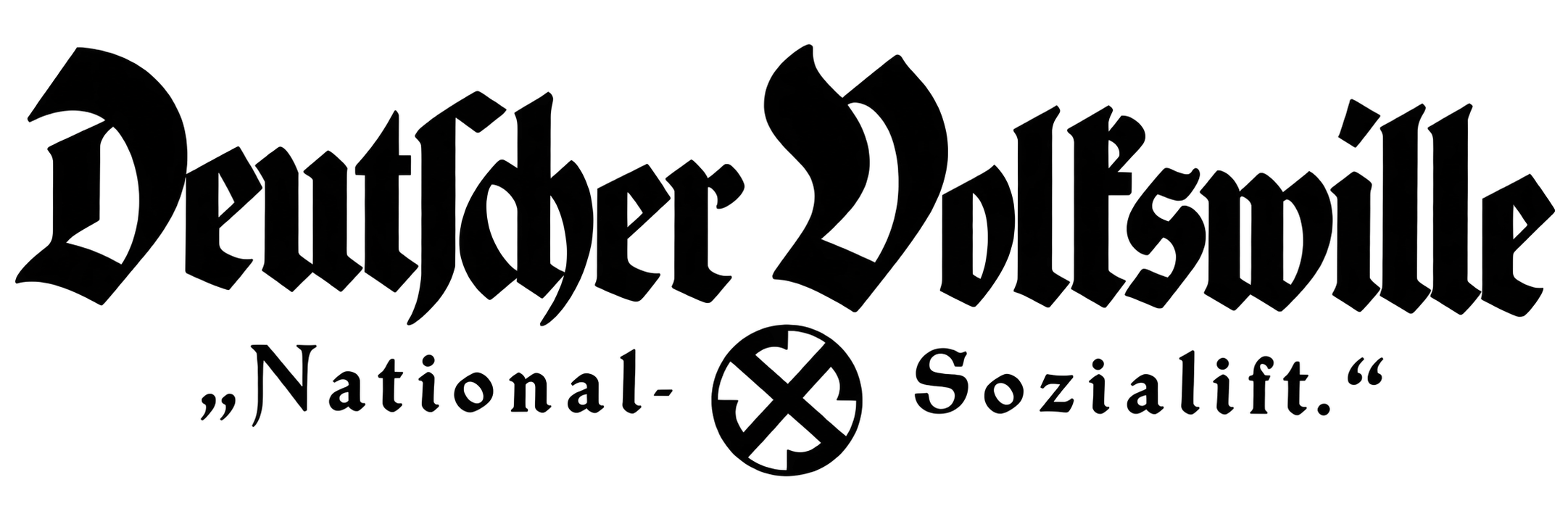
- Leader: Alfred Brunner
- Founder: Hans Georg Grassinger
- Founded: Late 1918
- Dissolved: December 1922
- Merged into: NSDAP
- Headquarters: Nuremberg, Bavaria
- Newspaper: Deutscher Sozialist
- Membership: approx. 2,000 (1920 est.)
- Ideology: Völkisch nationalism; Antisemitism; Anti-Marxism
- Political position: Far-right
- Religion: Völkisch mysticism
- Colors: Black

The German Socialist Party (German: Deutschsozialistische Partei, abbreviated DSP) was a short-lived far-right and völkisch political party active in Germany during the early Weimar Republic. Founded in 1918, it aimed to combine radical nationalist ideology with a populist appeal to the working class. Despite some initial activity, it failed to build a mass following and dissolved in 1922, with many of its members joining the Nazi Party.

The DSP was ideologically influenced by the antisemitic Thule Society, especially under the leadership of Rudolf von Sebottendorf, and by engineer and early party theorist Alfred Brunner. It sought to replace Marxist socialism with a "national socialism" rooted in ethnic nationalism and anti-capitalism directed specifically against "Jewish finance capital".

Originally active only in Nuremberg and Franconia, the DSP attempted to contest the 1920 German federal election but won only around 7,000 votes nationwide. Following this electoral failure, the party attempted to merge with other nationalist organizations. In 1921, DSP official Julius Streicher formed a temporary alliance with the Völkische Werkgemeinschaft and entered merger discussions with the National Socialist German Workers' Party (NSDAP). Although NSDAP chairman Anton Drexler was receptive, Adolf Hitler vehemently opposed the merger and threatened to resign, leading to his assumption of full leadership of the NSDAP.

Hitler's opposition may have been influenced by a personal rejection by the DSP. According to party founder Hans Georg Grassinger, Hitler had attempted to join the DSP in 1919, offering to write for the party’s newspaper and requesting financial support. His offer was rejected.

By December 1922, the DSP was in decline. Most of its prominent members, including Streicher, defected to the NSDAP. The party formally disbanded and advised its remaining members to support Hitler's movement.

Although ultimately unsuccessful, the DSP was one of several radical nationalist groups that helped shape the ideological terrain from which the Nazi Party emerged. Historian Karl Dietrich Bracher described the party as part of the "ideological testing ground" for National Socialism. Other scholars, such as Richard J. Evans and George L. Mosse, have emphasized its role in circulating key elements of Nazi ideology, particularly racial antisemitism, anti-Marxism, and the idea of a unified national community (Volksgemeinschaft).

== See also ==
- Economic antisemitism

== Works cited ==
- Kershaw, Ian (2008). Hitler: A Biography. New York: W. W. Norton & Company. ISBN 978-0-393-06757-6.
- Orlow, Dietrich (1969). The History of the Nazi Party: 1919-1933. University of Pittsburgh Press. SBN 822931834.
