= Hanseatic People's League =

- Founded: 1926
- Headquarters: Lübeck, Germany
- Ideology: Anti-social democracy

The Hanseatic People's League (German: Hanseatischer Volksbund) was a Weimar era political party in Lübeck, Germany. The party was founded in 1926. The party was formed by middle-class sectors that opposed the Social Democrats, in response to the takeover of the mayoral post of Lübeck by the Social Democrats. The Hanseatic People's League proclaimed itself as a 'gathering point for all non-Marxist, i.e. non-SPD/KPD, voters'. The party entered into an alliance with the German People's Party.

In the 14 November 1926 Landtag election, the Hanseatic People's League became the largest party with 36 out of 80 seats in the assembly. In the 1929 Landtag election, the size of the party faction in the assembly shrunk to 29 seats. In total, the party had obtained 27,881 votes (35.51% of the votes cast).

Following the 1932 Landtag election, the party supported the NSDAP (Nazi party) in the assembly.
