= Weimar Coalition =

German government and political alliance

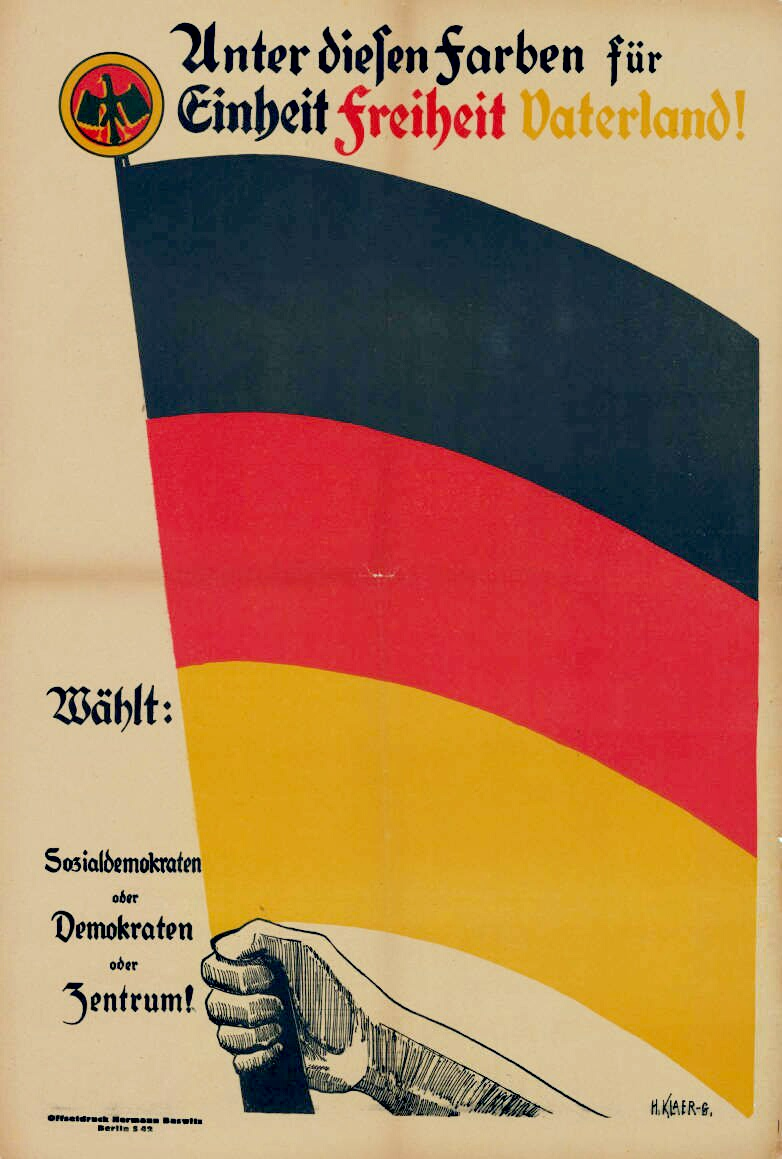
Weimar Coalition poster from the December 1924 German federal election

The Weimar Coalition (German: Weimarer Koalition) is the name given to the coalition government formed by the Social Democratic Party of Germany (SPD), the German Democratic Party (DDP) and the Catholic Centre Party (Z), who together had a large majority of the delegates to the Constituent Assembly that met at Weimar in 1919, and were the principal groups that designed the constitution of the Weimar Republic. These three parties were seen as the most committed to Germany's new democratic system, and together governed Germany until the elections of 1920, when the first elections under the new constitution were held, and both the SPD and especially the DDP lost a considerable share of their votes.

Although the Coalition was revived in the ministry of Joseph Wirth from 1921 to 1922, the pro-democratic elements never truly had a majority in the Reichstag from this point on, and the situation gradually grew worse for them with the continued weakening of the DDP. This meant that any pro-republican group that hoped to attain a majority would need to form a "Grand Coalition" with the conservative-liberal German People's Party (DVP), which only gradually moved from monarchism to republicanism over the course of the Weimar Republic and was virtually wiped out politically after the death of their most prominent figure, Foreign Minister Gustav Stresemann in 1929.

Nevertheless, the coalition remained at least theoretically important as the parties most supportive of republican government in Germany, and continued to act in coalition in the government of the Free State of Prussia (by far Germany's largest constituent state both by population and by area) and other states until as late as 1932. In the second round of voting in the 1925 presidential election, the Weimar Coalition parties all supported the candidacy of the Centrist former chancellor Wilhelm Marx, who was narrowly defeated by Field Marshal Paul von Hindenburg, supported by a centre-right coalition of the DVP, the German National People's Party (DNVP), and the Bavarian People's Party (BVP). The fact that the Communist Party of Germany (KPD) decided to run their candidate Ernst Thälmann in the second round was widely seen as a spoiler candidate who in effect threw the election to Hindenburg. Both the Comintern and East German historiography later criticized this action by the KPD-leadership as a mistake.

After World War II, the reconstituted SPD and the de facto successor of the Centre Party (the Christian Democratic Union (CDU) (within Bavaria the BVP was de facto succeeded by the Christian Social Union in Bavaria (CSU) which together formed the centre-right Union) and the DDP's and DVP's joint de facto successor (Free Democratic Party) formed the main political basis of the democratic Bundestag of West Germany.

== History ==
During the era of the German Empire, before the German Revolution of 1918–1919, politicians of the Centre Party and Social Democratic Party as well as the left liberals who would later form the German Democratic Party had cooperated when they censured Chancellor Theobald von Bethmann Hollweg in 1913 for his handling of the Zabern Affair and then later in 1917 with their support of the Reichstag peace resolution which called for a peace with no annexations. To coordinate their cooperation they also formed an inter-party committee (interfraktioneller Ausschuss) that included members of all three parliamentary groups. The three parties had to deal with opposition from the right from 1912 on even though in the course of the war the SPD split with far left-groups like the Spartacus League that were fundamentally opposed not just to the war but to all attempts at working within the political system of the Empire. The right wing, through the stab in the back myth, would later pin the blame for Germany's loss in the war on the alleged "defeatist" parties of the Weimar Coalition and cited the peace resolution as well as the willingness of politicians like Friedrich Ebert (SPD) to take power after the collapse of the Empire. They also blamed the Weimar Coalition-backed government for signing the Treaty of Versailles after it had lodged no more than an ineffectual complaint.

The elections of 6 June 1920 resulted in severe decline in the Coalition's parliamentary strength, despite hopes that the dramatic failure of the right-wing Kapp Putsch would lessen the political reorientation of the Reichstag parties. The SPD received 21.7% of the vote, a significant drop from the 37.9% it had in January 1919. The DDP suffered the greatest loss, dropping from 18.5% to 8.4%. The Centre Party received 13.6% of the vote, only a slight decline from the 15.1% it had previously held. The swing shows the fundamental problem the Weimar Coalition parties faced throughout the Weimar Republic. The SPD lost most of its vote share to the Independent Social Democratic Party of Germany, a left wing splinter faction opposed to any cooperation between leftist and bourgeois parties while the democratic center-right parties lost to the monarchist and revanchist right wing parties which capitalized on the widespread outrage at the Treaty of Versailles. Politics of pragmatism, comprise and moderation as espoused by the parties of the Weimar Coalition thus always faced attacks from strong anti-compromise forces on both the left and the right, which by 1930 formed a strong and growing share of the Reichstag, now mostly composed of the Communist Party of Germany and the Nazi Party, with the former rejecting any popular front-style cooperation due to the social fascism thesis. The communists and to a lesser extent the Nazis particularly attacked the Heinrich Brüning government in office 1930–1932 due to the austerity measures it enacted. Given that the communists rejected any cooperation with the Social Democratic Party, the SPD backed Brüning in any motion of no confidence initiated against him by Nazis and/or communists in hope of preventing an even more right wing government.

== Chronology ==
- 13 February 1919 – 20 June 1919: chancellor: Philipp Scheidemann (SPD)
- 21 June 1919 – 26 March 1920: chancellor: Gustav Bauer (SPD)
- 27 March 1920 – 8 June 1920: chancellor: Hermann Müller (SPD)
- 10 May 1921 – 22 October 1921: chancellor: Joseph Wirth (Zentrum)
- 29 October 1921 – 14 November 1922: chancellor: Joseph Wirth (Zentrum)

== See also ==
- Great Coalition (Weimar Republic)
- Germany coalition
