= Schleswig-Holstein Farmers and Farmworkers Democracy =

Former Political Party in The Weimar Republic

Schleswig-Holstein Farmers and Farmworkers Democracy (German: Schleswig-Holsteinische Bauern- und Landarbeiterdemokratie) (later known as the Schleswig-Holstein Regional Party (German: Schleswig-Holsteinische Landespartei)) was a regional agrarian political party based in Schleswig-Holstein during the Weimar Republic. The party won a single seat in the 1919 federal election and one in the Free State of Prussia the same year.

A moderate party that leaned towards liberalism, the SHBLD co-operated with the German People's Party in the 1919 elections. However Hinrich Lohse, who was appointed General Secretary of the party in 1920, went on to serve as a Nazi Party official.
