= Nazi Party election results =

Election results of a German party

Nazi Party election results presents a series of tables that summarize the election results of the National Socialist German Workers' Party (German: Nationalsozialistische Deutsche Arbeiterpartei, NSDAP), usually referred to as the Nazi Party, in German national and state elections, during its existence. They display the number of votes received, the percentage of the vote, the Party's numerical ranking, the number of parliamentary seats won and the change in the number of seats.

- The national data track the results of all parliamentary and presidential elections that the Party contested from its re-founding in 1925 throughout the existence of the Weimar Republic and the Third Reich, ending with the last Reichstag election in 1938.
- The state tables provide election results in the seventeen landtage (state parliaments) during the Weimar period only, from the Party's reestablishment in 1925 through the elections of 1932. The "Provisional Law on the Coordination of the States with the Reich" was enacted on 31 March 1933 and directed that the existing elected landtage were to be reconstituted on the basis of each party's share of the votes received in the Reichstag election of 5 March. This was followed by the Law on the Reconstruction of the Reich, which was passed on 30 January 1934, abolishing the state landtage altogether and transferring the sovereign rights of the states to the Reich government, thus effectively replacing the German federal system with a unitary state. No subsequent state elections were conducted.

== Tables of national election results ==
Source: Andreas Gonschior

=== German Reichstag ===
Election year	Votes	%	+/–	Seats won	+/–	Position	Leader	Status	Notes
1928	810,127	2.63	▲2.63 pp	12 / 491	▲12	9	Adolf Hitler	Opposition	
1930	6,379,672	18.25	▲15.62 pp	107 / 577	▲95	▲2	Adolf Hitler	Main opposition	
July 1932	13,745,680	37.27	▲19.02 pp	230 / 608	▲123	▲1	Adolf Hitler	Main opposition	
November 1932	11,737,021	33.09	▼4.18 pp	196 / 584	▼34	1	Adolf Hitler	Main opposition	Last free and fair election.
March 1933	17,277,180	43.91	▲10.82 pp	288 / 647	▲92	1	Adolf Hitler	Coalition government	Semi-free yet questionable election. Last multi-party contested election. After the Nazi seizure of power on 30 January and just six days after the Reichstag fire.
November 1933	39,655,224	92.11	▲48.20 pp	661 / 661	▲373	1	Adolf Hitler	Majority government	Sole legal party.
1936	44,462,458	98.80	▲6.69 pp	741 / 741	▲80	1	Adolf Hitler	Majority government	Sole legal party.
1938	44,451,092	99.08	▲0.28 pp	813 / 813	▲72	1	Adolf Hitler	Majority government	Sole legal party.

=== German Presidency ===
Election year	Candidate	First round			Second round		
Election year	Candidate	Votes	%	Place	Votes	%	Place
1925	endorsed Erich Ludendorff (1.1%)				endorsed Paul von Hindenburg (48.3%)		
1932	Adolf Hitler	11,339,446	30.1	2nd	13,418,547	36.8	2nd

== Tables of state Landtag election results ==

=== Anhalt ===
Election year	Votes	%	Seats won	+/–
1928	4,117	2.07% #8	1 / 36	▲1
1932	89,652	40.88% #1	15 / 36	▲14

=== Baden ===
Election year	Votes	%	Seats won	+/–
1925	8,917	1.16% #8	0 / 72	
1929	65,121	6.98% #4	6 / 88	▲6

=== Bavaria ===
Election year	Votes	%	Seats won	+/–
1928	203,115	6.13 #5	9 / 128	▲9
1932	1,270,792	32.52% #2	43 / 128	▲34

=== Bremen ===
Election year	Votes	%	Seats won	+/–
1930	51,327	25.40% #2	32 / 120	▲32

=== Brunswick ===
Election year	Votes	%	Seats won	+/–
1927	10,358	3.73 #8	1 / 48	▲1
1930	67,902	22.16% #3	9 / 40	▲8

=== Hamburg ===
Election year	Votes	%	Seats won	+/–
1927	9,754	1.50% #8	2 / 160	▲2
1928	14,760	2.15% #7	3 / 160	▲1
1931	202,506	26.25% #2	43 / 160	▲40
1932	233,750	31.23% #1	51 / 160	▲8

=== Hesse ===
Election year	Votes	%	Seats won	+/–
1931	291,183	37.08% #1	27 / 70	▲27
1932	328,306	43.97% #1	32 / 70	▲5

=== Lippe ===
Election year	Votes	%	Seats won	+/–
1929	2,713	3.35% #9	0 / 21	
1933	39,064	39.48% #1	9 / 21	▲9

=== Lübeck ===
Election year	Votes	%	Seats won	+/–
1929	6,347	8.08% #4	6 / 80	▲6
1932	27,689	33.13% #2	27 / 80	▲21

=== Mecklenburg-Schwerin ===
Election year	Votes	%	Seats won	+/–
1926	4,607	1.65% #9	0 / 50	
1927	5,611	1.80% #9	0 / 52	
1929	12,721	4.05% #4	2 / 51	▲2
1932	177,076	48.98% #1	30 / 59	▲28

=== Mecklenburg-Strelitz ===
Election year	Votes	%	Seats won	+/–
1932	14,235	23.86% #3	9 / 35	▲9

=== Oldenburg ===
Election year	Votes	%	Seats won	+/–
1928	17,457	7.52% #5	3 / 48	▲3
1931	97,806	37.23% #1	19 / 48	▲16
1932	131,543	48.38% #1	24 / 46	▲5

=== Prussia ===
Election year	Votes	%	Seats won	+/–
1928	346,771	1.84 #9	6 / 450	▲6
1932	8,091,072	36.67% #1	162 / 423	▲156

=== Saxony ===
Election year	Votes	%	Seats won	+/–
1929	133,958	4.96 #7	5 / 96	▲5
1930	376,769	14.43% #2	14 / 96	▲9

=== Schaumburg-Lippe ===
Election year	Votes	%	Seats won	+/–
1928	1,690	6.78 #6	1 / 15	▲1
1931	7,854	26.94% #2	4 / 15	▲3

=== Thuringia ===
Election year	Votes	%	Seats won	+/–
1927	27,946	3.48% #5	2 / 56	▲2
1929	90,159	11.29% #3	6 / 53	▲4
1932	395,321	42.49% #1	26 / 61	▲20

=== Württemberg ===
Election year	Votes	%	Seats won	+/–
1928	20,342	1.81% #10	0 / 80	
1932	328,320	26.38% #1	23 / 80	▲23

== Sources ==
- Broszat, Martin (1981). The Hitler State: The Foundation and Development of the Internal Structure of the Third Reich. New York: Longman Inc. ISBN 978-0-582-48997-4.
- Gonschior, Andreas. "Wahlen in der Weimarer Republik". (Elections in the Weimar Republic).
