= 1919 Baden state election =

Election in the Weimar Republic

- 5 January 1919

All 107 seats in the Landtag 54 seats needed for a majority
- Registered: 1,168,432
- Turnout: 1,029,038 (88.1%)
	First party	Second party
Party	Centre	SPD
Seats won	39	36
Popular vote	376,208	329,317
Percentage	36.6%	32.1%
	Third party	Fourth party
Party	DDP	DNVP
Seats won	25	7
Popular vote	233,956	72,211
Percentage	22.8%	7.0%
Government before election
Heinrich Bodman
NLP-Centre
Government after election
Anton Geiss

The 1919 Baden state election was held on 5 January 1919 to elect the 107 members of the Baden Landtag. This was the first election in Baden to extend voting rights to women.

Duke Frederick II and the Grand Duchy of Baden were overthrown during the German Revolution following the end of World War I. Elections were scheduled by a provisional government led by Anton Geiss. The Centre Party won a plurality of the seats.

== Background ==
The Grand Duchy of Baden was one of the most liberal areas in the German Empire. The National Liberal Party (NLP) controlled the bureaucracy and politics of Baden during the 1800s. In 1904, legislation allowing secret ballots and the direct election of the lower house was passed. The Social Democratic Party (SPD) and Centre Party grew after 1904. The NLP and Centre formed a coalition after the 1913 election.

The SPD started advocating for the usage of proportional representation in 1917, but President Alexander von Dusch rejected the proposal. Heinrich Bodman replaced Dusch in December 1917. On 2 November 1918, the government announced legislation to create a proportional voting system.

== Revolution ==
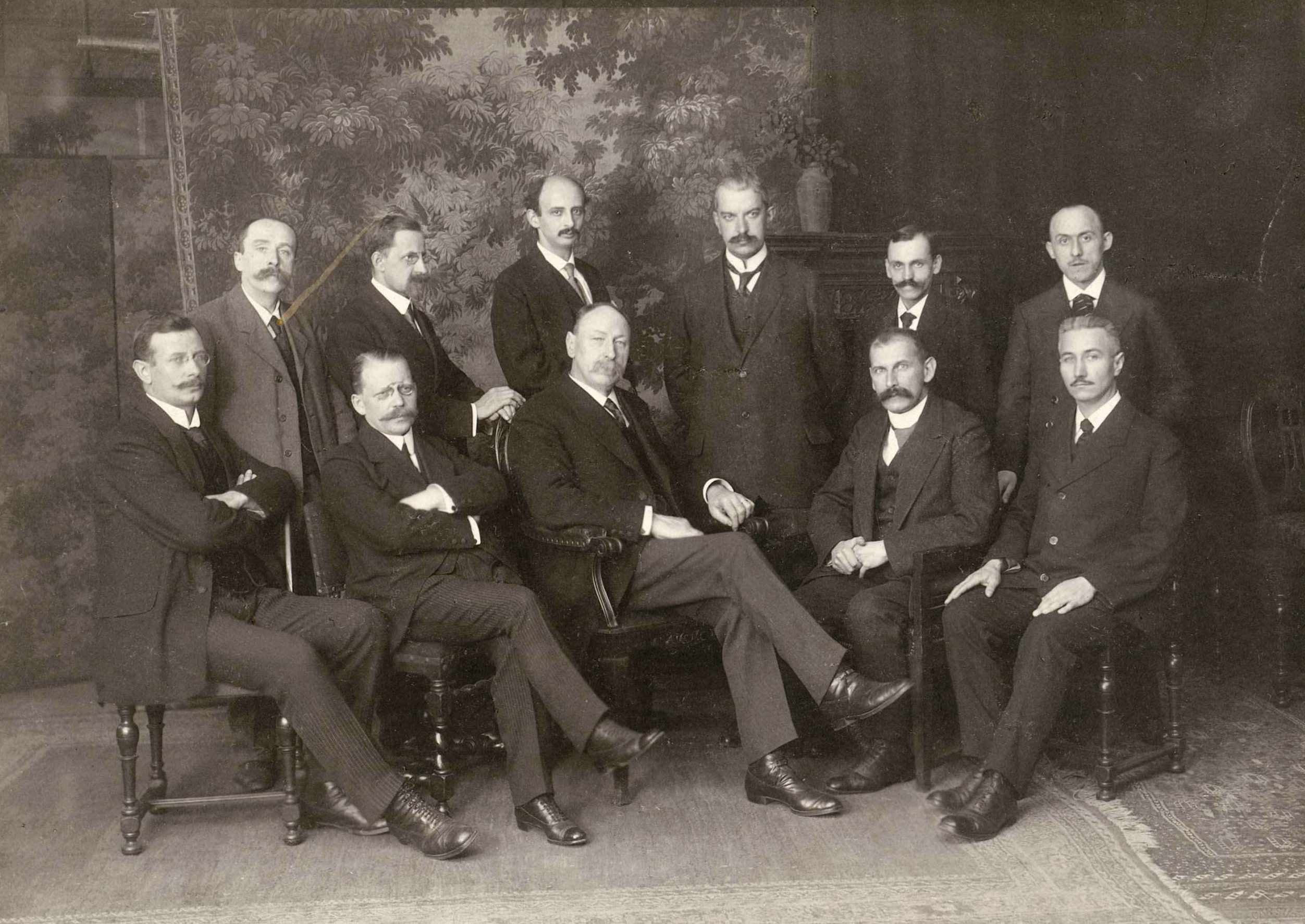
Members of the provisional government

The NLP, Centre, and Progressive (FVP) parties requested Bodman's resignation on 9 November, due to fears that violence would break out in Mannheim. Kaiser Wilhelm II abdicated the same day while the mayors of Mannheim and Karlsruhe formed Welfare Committees. The Karlsruhe Welfare Committee and Soviets formed a provisional government, with Bodman's recognition, on 10 November. Five SPD members, two Independent Social Democrats, two Centrists, and two National Liberals made up the government. The Free People's Republic of Baden was formed on 14 November, and elections scheduled on 5 January 1919.

Duke Frederick II called this government unconstitutional, but did not contest it and dismissed his ministers. Anton Geiss, the chair of the SPD in Baden and vice-president of the Landtag, chaired the provisional government. Frederick II renounced his governmental powers on 13 November, and abdicated on 22 November.

== Electoral system ==
The election used proportional representation. Four electoral districts (Mannheim, Karlsruhe, Freiburg, and Konstanz) had 107 seats, 36 more than the previous election. Candidates had to be at least 25 years old.

Suffrage was extended to all male and female citizens above the age of twenty. This was the first election in Baden in which suffrage was expanded to women.

== Results and aftermath ==
Members of the German Agrarian League formed organizations to support the German National People's Party (DNVP). The FVP dissolved during the election and merged with left-wing members of the NLP to form the German Democratic Party (DDP). Hans Brümmer and Adolf Schwarz, USPD members in the governmental cabinet, resigned following their party's poor performance in the election.

88.07% of the 1.16 million eligible voters participated in the election. This was the first election in which women were elected to the Landtag in Baden. Nine women were elected in total with four (Anna Maria Beyerle, Mathilde Ott, Maria Rigel, and Clara Siebert) from the Centre, four (Theresa Blase, Kunigunde Fischer, Luise Kräuter, and Sofie Regenscheid) from the SPD, and one (Marianne Weber) from the DDP. The Landtag convened on 15 January 1919.

In March, Baden became the first state in German to adopt a new constitution and it was approved by a referendum on 13 April. This constitution gave suffrage to all citizens above the age of 20 and established a unicameral legislature that served four year terms.

Graph of the party split among 107 seats.
Party	Votes	%	Seats
Centre Party	376,208	36.63	39
Social Democratic Party	329,317	32.06	36
German Democratic Party	233,956	22.78	25
German National People's Party	72,211	7.03	7
Independent Social Democratic Party of Germany	15,449	1.50	0
Total	1,027,141	100.00	107
Valid votes	1,027,141	99.82	
Invalid/blank votes	1,897	0.18	
Total votes	1,029,038	100.00	
Registered voters/turnout	1,168,432	88.07	
Source: Grill, Exner, Schröder

== Works cited ==
- Exner, Konrad (2016). "Die politischen und wirtschaftlichen Ereignisse der Republik Baden in der Zeit der Weimarer Republik". Badische Heimat. 96 (2). Landesverein Badische Heimat: 291–300.
- Grill, Johnpeter (1983). The Nazi Movement in Baden, 1920-1945. University of North Carolina Press. ISBN 0807814725.
- Schmidgall, Markus (2012). Die Revolution 1918/19 in Baden. Karlsruhe Institute of Technology. ISBN 9783866447271.
