= 1925 Baden state election =

- 25 October 1925

All 72 seats in the Landtag 37 seats needed for a majority
- Registered: 1,439,235
- Turnout: 55%
	First party	Second party	Third party
Party	Centre	SPD	DNVP
Last election	37.9%, 34 seats	22.7%, 20 seats	8.5%, 7 seats
Seats won	28	16	8
Seat change	▼6	▼4	▲1
Popular vote	283,4144	160,498	93,750
Percentage	36.8%	20.8%	12.2%
Swing	▼1.1pp	▼1.9pp	▲3.7pp
	Fourth party	Fifth party	Sixth party
Party	DVP	DDP	KPD
Last election	6.0%, 5 seats	8.5%, 7 seats	3.9%, 3 seats
Seats won	7	6	4
Seat change	Steady	▼1	▲1
Popular vote	72,887	66,652	47,343
Percentage	9.5%	8.7%	6.1%
Swing	▲3.5pp	▲0.2pp	▲2.2pp
Government before election
Willy Hellpach
Government after election
Gustav Trunk

The 1925 Baden state election was held on 25 October 1925 to elect the 72 members of the Landtag of the Republic of Baden.

== Background ==
Minister of the Interior Adam Remmele lifted the ban on the Nazi Party in 1925, stating that they were political irrelevant. Robert Heinrich Wagner was appointed as the Nazi Gauleiter of Gau Baden, the only person to hold that position, on 25 March 1925, and served until 1945.

Baden was 58.5% Catholic, 38.7% Protestant, and 2.9% were members of another religion. The Centre Party and Social Democratic Party (SPD) placed first and second respectively in Baden in the 1928 federal election.

== Campaign ==
The German National People's Party (DNVP) and Agricultural League formed a right-wing Rechtsblock coalition.

== Results ==
Graph of the party split among 72 seats.
Party	Votes	%	Seats	±
Centre Party	283,414	36.81	28	–6
Social Democratic Party	160,498	20.85	16	–4
German National People's Party	93,750	12.18	8	+1
German People's Party	72,887	9.47	7	+2
German Democratic Party	66,652	8.66	6	–1
Communist Party of Germany	47,343	6.15	4	+1
Reich Party of the German Middle Class	22,856	2.97	3	+2
Nazi Party	8,917	1.16	0	New
German Völkisch Freedom Party	6,420	0.83	0	New
German Revaluation and Reconstruction Party	4,176	0.54	0	New
Baden Tenant Farmers and Smallholders' League	2,979	0.39	0	New
Total	769,892	100.00	72	–14
Valid votes	769,892	98.77		
Invalid/blank votes	9,608	1.23		
Total votes	779,500	100.00		
Registered voters/turnout	1,439,235	54.16		
Source: Schröder, Gonschior

== Works cited ==
- Faris, Ellsworth (1975). "Takeoff Point for the National Socialist Party: The Landtag Election in Baden, 1929". Central European History. 8 (2). Cambridge University Press: 140–71. doi:10.2307/4545738. JSTOR 4545738.
- Grill, Johnpeter (1983). The Nazi Movement in Baden, 1920-1945. University of North Carolina Press. ISBN 0807814725.
