= Economic collapse =

Severe and prolonged economic problems

Economic collapse, also called economic meltdown, is any of a broad range of poor economic conditions, ranging from a severe, prolonged depression with high bankruptcy rates and high unemployment (such as the Great Depression of the 1930s), to a breakdown in normal commerce caused by hyperinflation (such as in Weimar Germany in the 1920s), or even an economically caused sharp rise in the death rate and perhaps even a decline in population (such as in countries of the former USSR in the 1990s). Often economic collapse is accompanied by social chaos, civil unrest and a breakdown of law and order.

== Cases ==
There are few well documented cases of economic collapse. One of the best documented cases of collapse or near collapse is the Great Depression, the causes of which are still being debated.

"To understand the Great Depression is the Holy Grail of macroeconomics." —Ben Bernanke (1995)

Bernanke's comment addresses the difficulty of identifying specific causes when many factors may each have contributed to various extents.

Past economic collapses have had political as well as financial causes. Persistent trade deficits, wars, revolutions, famines, depletion of important resources, and government-induced hyperinflation have been listed as causes.

In some cases blockades and embargoes caused severe hardships that could be considered economic collapse. In the U.S. the Embargo Act of 1807 forbade foreign trade with warring European nations, causing a severe depression in the heavily international trade-dependent economy, especially in the shipping industry and port cities, ending a great boom. The Union blockade of the Confederate States of America severely damaged the South's plantation owners; however, the South had little economic development. The blockade of Germany during World War I led to starvation of hundreds of thousands of Germans but did not cause economic collapse, at least until the political turmoil and the hyperinflation that followed. For both the Confederacy and Weimar Germany, the cost of the war was worse than the blockade. Many Southern plantation owners had their bank accounts confiscated and also all had to free their slaves without compensation. The Germans had to make war reparations.

Following defeat in war, the conquering country or faction may not accept paper currency of the vanquished, and the paper becomes worthless. (This was the situation of the Confederacy.) Government debt obligations, primarily bonds, are often restructured and sometimes become worthless. Therefore, there is a tendency for the public to hold gold and silver during times of war or crisis.

== Effects of war and hyperinflation on wealth and commerce ==
Hyperinflation, wars, and revolutions cause hoarding of essentials and a disruption of markets. In some past hyperinflations, workers were paid daily and immediately spent their earnings on essential goods, which they often used for barter. Store shelves were frequently empty. A vivid example of it was seen in Armenia. During the collapse of the Soviet Union, Armenia experienced three major shocks during this early phase of transformation, resulting in hyperinflation and loss of huge part of commerce. First, the old central planning regime collapsed, and many big Armenian companies that had been developed to serve the Soviet Union lost their markets almost overnight. Second, as an energy importer, Armenia's terms of exchange deteriorated sharply as the price of imported energy soared dramatically compared to the prices of its exports. Third, the war in Nagorno-Karabakh was a huge burden on the economy, and it was followed by blockades and other economic disturbances, some of which continue to this day. As a result, by 1993, Armenia's GDP had fallen to just 47 percent of its 1990 level. However, by the middle of the 1990s, hyperinflation in Armenia had been tamed thanks to the tight collaboration of the government and the Central Bank of Armenia (CBA) in implementing strong monetary and fiscal policies. The average consumer price inflation was reduced from over 5,000% (1994) to 175% (1995). Armenia was, indeed, one of the region's true success stories.

More stable foreign currencies, silver and gold (usually coins) were held and exchanged in place of local currency. The minting country of precious metal coins tended to be relatively unimportant. Jewelry was also used as a medium of exchange. Alcoholic beverages were also used for barter.

Desperate individuals sold valuable possessions to buy essentials or traded them for gold and silver.

In the German hyperinflation, stocks held much more of their value than paper currency. Bonds denominated in the inflating currency may lose most or all value.

== Bank holidays, conversion or confiscation of accounts and new currency ==
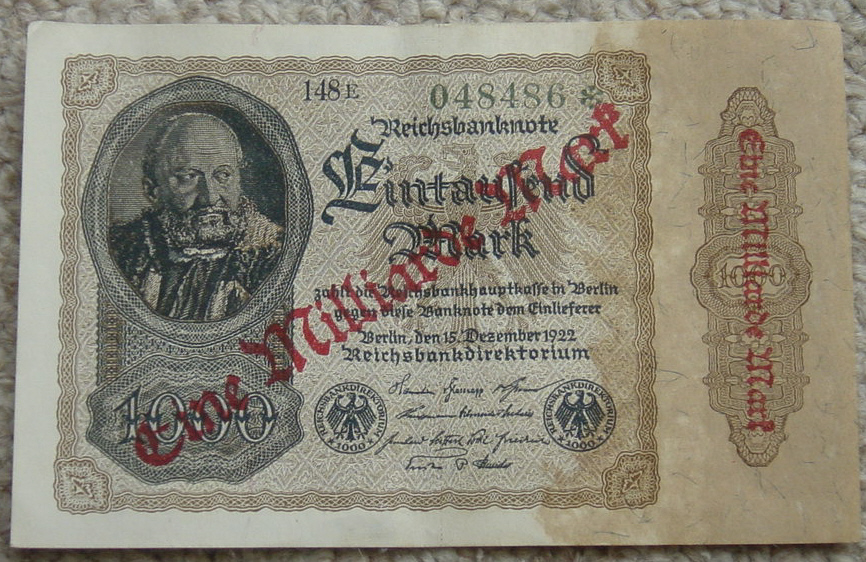
A German 1000 mark banknote, over-stamped in red with "Eine Milliarde Mark" long scale (1,000,000,000 mark) during the hyperinflation of 1923

During severe financial crises, sometimes governments close banks. Depositors may be unable to withdraw their money for long periods, as was true in the United States in 1933 under the Emergency Banking Act. Withdrawals may be limited. Bank deposits may be involuntarily converted to government bonds or to a new currency of lesser value in foreign exchange.

During financial crises and even less severe situations, capital controls are often imposed to restrict or prohibit transferring or personally taking money, securities or other valuables out of a country. To end hyperinflations a new currency is typically issued. The old currency is often not worth exchanging for new.

== Historical examples ==
=== China 1852–70 ===
The Taiping Rebellion followed by internal warfare, famines and epidemics caused the deaths of over 100 million and greatly damaged the economy.

=== Weimar Germany in the 1920s ===
Following Germany's defeat in World War I, political instability resulted in murders and assassinations of hundreds of political figures. (See: German Revolution of 1918–1919 and Kapp Putsch)

Germany's finances were heavily strained by the war and reparations in accordance with the Treaty of Versailles, leaving the government unable to raise enough taxation to operate and make war reparations. The government resorted to printing money to cover the shortfall, which resulted in major hyperinflation; one book on these events, which includes quotes and a few first hand accounts, is When Money Dies. The hyperinflation ended in December 1923, with government debt being cleared at the cost of ordinary citizens' savings.

Some believe that the hyperinflation of 1923 helped fuel the eventual rise of the Nazi party, and the rise of Hitler to power in 1933. Economists, however, tend to attribute Hitler's rise to the Deflation and the Great Depression beginning in 1929. Paul Krugman concluded that the 1923 hyperinflation didn't bring Hitler to power, but the Brüning deflation and depression. Before 1929, the Nazi party had been actually in decline, receiving less than 3% of votes in the German federal election in 1928 (see election results of the Nazi Party).

=== The Great Depression of the 1930s ===
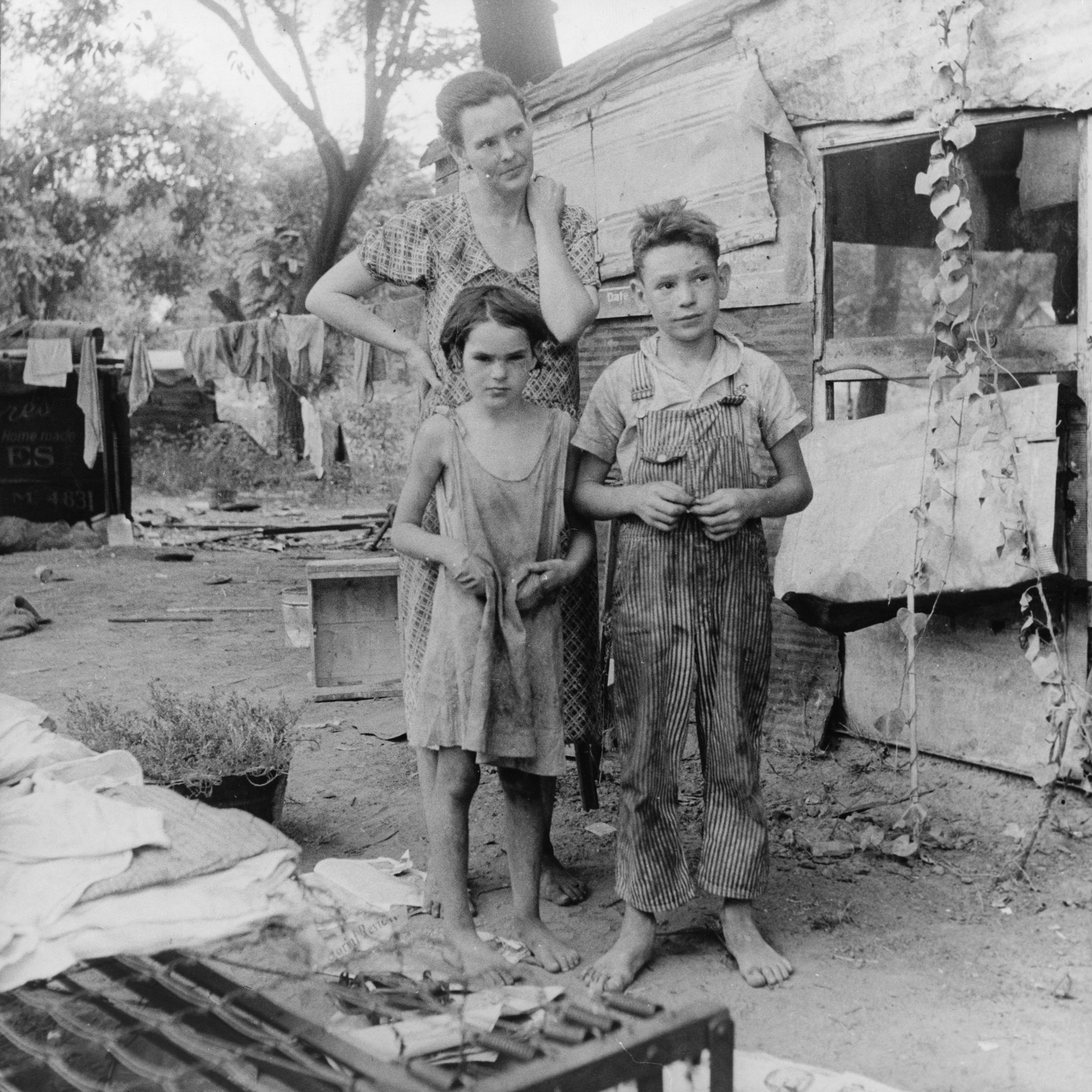
An impoverished American family living in a shanty, 1936

While arguably not a true economic collapse, the decade of the 1930s witnessed the most severe worldwide economic contraction since the start of the Industrial Revolution. In the US, the Depression began in the summer of 1929, soon followed by the stock market crash of October 1929. American stock prices continued to decline in fits and starts until they hit bottom in July 1932. In the first quarter of 1933, the banking system broke down: asset prices had collapsed, bank lending had largely ceased, a quarter of the American work force was unemployed, and real GDP per capita in 1933 was 29% below its 1929 value. The ensuing rapid recovery was interrupted by a major recession in 1937–38. The U.S. fully recovered by 1941, the eve of its entry in World War II, which gave rise to a boom as dramatic as the Depression that preceded it.

While there were numerous bank failures during the Great Depression, most banks in developed countries survived, as did most currencies and governments. The most significant monetary change during the depression was the demise of the gold standard by most nations that were on it. In the U.S., the dollar was redeemable in gold until 1933 when U.S. citizens were forced to turn over their gold (except for 5 ounces) for fiat currency (See: Executive Order 6102) and were forbidden to own monetary gold for the next four decades. Subsequently, gold was revalued from $20.67 per ounce to $35 per ounce. U.S. dollars remained redeemable in gold by foreigners until 1971. Gold ownership was legalized in the U.S. in 1974, but not with legal tender status.

As bad as the Great Depression was, it took place during a period of high productivity growth, which caused real wages to rise. The high unemployment was partly a result of the productivity gains, allowing the number of hours of the standard work week to be cut while restoring economic output to previous levels after a few years. Workers who remained employed saw their real hourly earnings rise because wages remained constant while prices fell; however, overall earnings remained relatively constant because of the reduced work week. Converting the dollar to a fiat currency and devaluing against gold ensured the end of deflation and created inflation, which made the high debt accumulated during the 1920s boom easier to repay, although some of the debt was written off.

=== The Eastern Bloc in the 1980s and 90s ===
During the 1980s, the Eastern Bloc, which relied on a highly centralized form of planned economy, experienced a decade-long period of stagnation from which it did not recover. The end of the decade saw revolutions and the fall of communist regimes throughout Central and Eastern Europe, and eventually in the Soviet Union (USSR) by 1991. The process was accompanied by a gradual but important easing of restrictions on economic and political behaviour in the late 1980s, including the satellite states, culminating with economic collapse and shock therapy in the 1990s. Even before Russia's financial crisis of 1998, Russia's GDP was half of what it had been in the early 1990s.

The collapse in the USSR was characterized by an increase in the death rate, especially by men over 50, with alcoholism a major cause. There was also an increase in violent crime and murder. The Russian population peaked in the 1990s and is lower today than two decades ago, as the demographics of Russia show.

A firsthand account of conditions during the economic collapse was told by Dmitry Orlov, a former USSR citizen who became a US citizen but returned to Russia for a time during the crisis.

=== Russian financial crisis of 1998 ===
After more or less stabilizing after the disintegration of the USSR, a severe financial crisis took place in the Russian Federation in August 1998. It was caused by low oil prices and government expenditure cuts after the end of the Cold War. Other nations of the former Soviet Union also experienced economic collapse, although a number of crises also involved armed conflicts, like in the break-away region Chechnya. The default by Russia on its government bonds in 1998 led to the collapse of highly leveraged hedge fund Long Term Capital Management, which threatened the world financial system. The U.S. Federal Reserve organized a bailout of LTCM which turned it over to a banking consortium.

=== 1998–2002 Argentine great depression ===
The depression, which began after the Russian and Brazilian financial crises, caused widespread unemployment, riots, the fall of the government, a default on the country's foreign debt, the rise of alternative currencies and the end of the peso's fixed exchange rate to the US dollar. The economy shrank by 28 percent from 1998 to 2002. In terms of income, over 50 percent of Argentines were poor and 25 percent, indigent; seven out of ten Argentine children were poor at the depth of the crisis in 2002.

By the end of November 2001, people began withdrawing large sums of dollars from their bank accounts, turning pesos into dollars, and sending them abroad, which caused a bank run.

The freeze enraged many Argentines who took to the streets of important cities, especially Buenos Aires. They engaged in protests.

The president De la Rúa eventually fled the Casa Rosada in a helicopter on 21 December 2001.

=== Zimbabwe economic crisis (2000–present) ===
Zimbabwe has had an economic crisis since the early 2000s with some periods of partial recovery in between. Hyperinflation peaked at an estimated 89.7 sextillion percent year-on-year in November 2008 then stabilising after the local currency was abandoned. In May 2020, annual inflation reached more than 800% following the reintroduction of the local currency, after which the government stopped releasing statistics as they had previously done over a decade earlier. GDP contracted from 2001 to 2008 and from 2018 to present.

=== Venezuela economic crisis (2013–present) ===
Since 2013, Venezuela has been suffering an economic crisis. It's the worst in Venezuelan history, caused by the economic policies of the president, Nicolás Maduro the successor of Hugo Chávez, the fall in oil prices and internal and external factors. Since 2014, Venezuela's GDP has been in recession, falling more 40%. The economy has collapsed, causing shortages of basics goods, economic downturn and hyperinflation since 2017. Also, there are drastic increases in the crime, corruption, poverty and hunger. Millions of Venezuelans have fled to neighboring countries.

=== Other economic trends ===
In Latvia, GDP declined more than 20% from 2008 to 2010, one of the worst recessions on record. In Greece, GDP declined more than 26% starting in 2008.

== Doom loop ==
In economics, a doom loop is "a negative spiral that can result when banks hold sovereign bonds and governments bail out banks". It can lead to economic collapse.

In 2021, Italian and French banks increased their holdings of sovereign debt to slightly worrying levels, as a result of stimulus spending and monetary policy.

== Alternative theories ==
=== Austrian school ===
Some economists (i.e. the Austrian School, in particular Ludwig von Mises), believe that government intervention and over-regulation of the economy can lead to the conditions for collapse. In particular, Austrian theoretical research has been focused on such problems emanating from socialist forms of economic organization. This however is not a theory of economic collapse involving the breakdown of freely functioning financial markets; rather, the focus is on economic malfunction and crisis emanating from state control.

However, many Austrian economists also subscribe to what is called the "ABCT", or Austrian Business Cycle Theory. Economist Roger Garrison describes the bubble as merely a form of unsustainable boom (not a theory of all depressions), as Mises and F.A. Hayek did, despite their disagreements on the exact workings of it. The essential part of the theory is that it is inherently unsustainable to try to manipulate monetary policy to boost both investment and consumption; usually through interest rate manipulation and bond-buying and such. The "boom" was created by "malinvestments," as Mises called them; business decisions that are bad investments and unsustainable in the long run because lowering interest rates by padding the supply of money and credit will only work in the short-term, but will ultimately collapse because the government can only hold down interest rates so long before fear of inflation kicks in (and deflation comes at the peak of the business cycle), or they go into hyperinflation (which is completely outside the realm of the ABCT).

=== Georgescu-Roegen's theory of Earth's ever decreasing carrying capacity ===
Romanian American economist Nicholas Georgescu-Roegen, a progenitor in economics and the paradigm founder of ecological economics, has argued that the carrying capacity of Earth—that is, Earth's capacity to sustain human populations and consumption levels – is bound to decrease sometime in the future as Earth's finite stock of mineral resources is presently being extracted and put to use; and consequently, that the world economy as a whole is heading towards an inevitable future collapse, leading to the demise of human civilisation itself.

Georgescu-Roegen is basing his pessimistic prediction on the two following considerations:

- According to his ecological view of 'entropy pessimism', matter and energy is neither created nor destroyed in man's economy, only transformed from states available for human purposes (valuable natural resources) to states unavailable for human purposes (valueless waste and pollution). In effect, all of man's technologies and activities are only speeding up the general march against a future planetary 'heat death' of degraded energy, exhausted natural resources and a deteriorated environment—a state of maximum entropy on Earth.
- According to his social theory of 'bioeconomics', man's economic struggle to work and earn a livelihood is largely a continuation and extension of the biological struggle to sustain life and survive. This struggle manifests itself as a permanent social conflict that can be eliminated neither by man's decision to do so nor by the social evolution of mankind. Consequently, we are biologically unable to restrain ourselves collectively on a permanent and voluntary basis for the benefit of unknown future generations; the pressure of population on Earth's resources will only increase.

Taken together, the Industrial Revolution in Britain in the second half of the 18th century has unintentionally thrust man's economy into a long, never-to-return overshoot-and-collapse trajectory with regard to the Earth's mineral stock. The world economy will continue growing until its inevitable and final collapse in the future. From that point on, ever deepening scarcities will aggravate social conflict throughout the globe and ultimately spell the end of mankind itself, Georgescu-Roegen conjectures.

Georgescu-Roegen was the paradigm founder of ecological economics and is also considered the main intellectual figure influencing the degrowth movement. Consequently, much work in these fields is devoted to discussing the existential impossibility of allocating Earth's finite stock of mineral resources evenly among an unknown number of present and future generations. This number of generations is likely to remain unknown to us, as there is no way – or only little way – of knowing in advance if or when mankind will ultimately face extinction. In effect, any conceivable intertemporal allocation of the finite stock will inevitably end up with universal economic decline at some future point.

== See also ==
- Black swan theory
- Causes of the Great Depression
- Currency crisis
- Dependency ratio
- Devaluation
- Economic bubble
- Great Contraction
- Hindenburg Omen
- Homelessness
- Pensions crisis
- Rare disaster
- Societal collapse
- Sociocultural evolution
- State collapse
- Stock market crash
- Stock market crashes in India
- Survivalism
- Systemic development
- Too connected to fail
- The Limits to Growth

Examples:

- Great Famine (Ireland)
- Panic of 1837
- Panic of 1873
- Panic of 1893
- Panic of 1907
- 1997 Asian financial crisis
- Soviet famine of 1930–1933
- Bengal famine of 1943
- Great Recession
- Dot-com bubble
- List of stock market crashes and bear markets
