= 1921 Baden state election =

The 1921 Baden state election was held on 30 October 1921 to elect the 86 members of the Landtag of the Republic of Baden.

== Campaign ==
75.5% of male voters and 63.5% of female voters participated in the election. The electorate was 51.1% male and 48.9% female.

== Results ==
Graph of the party split among 86 seats.
Party	Votes	%	Seats	±
Centre Party	341,438	37.87	34	–5
Social Democratic Party	204,416	22.67	20	–16
German Democratic Party	76,264	8.46	7	–18
German National People's Party	76,229	8.45	7	0
Baden Farmers	74,896	8.31	7	New
German People's Party	54,426	6.04	5	New
Communist Party of Germany	35,375	3.92	3	New
Independent Social Democratic Party	27,197	3.02	2	+2
Reich Party of the German Middle Class	11,429	1.27	1	New
Total	901,670	100.00	86	–21
Valid votes	901,670	99.50		
Invalid/blank votes	4,563	0.50		
Total votes	906,233	100.00		
Registered voters/turnout	1,311,527	69.10		
Source: Schröder, Gonschior

== Works cited ==
- Faris, Ellsworth (1975). "Takeoff Point for the National Socialist Party: The Landtag Election in Baden, 1929". Central European History. 8 (2). Cambridge University Press: 140–71. doi:10.2307/4545738. JSTOR 4545738.
