= Walter Köhler =

Nazi politician (1897–1989)

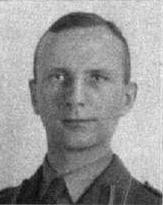
- Köhler in 1933

Minister President Baden
- In office 6 May 1933 – 4 April 1945
- Preceded by: Robert Heinrich Wagner
- Succeeded by: Position vacated

Minister of Finance and Economics Baden
- In office 11 March 1933 – 4 April 1945

Deputy Gauleiter of Gau Baden
- In office August 1931 – May 1933
- Preceded by: Karl Lenz
- Succeeded by: Hermann Röhn

Additional positions
- 1933–1945: Reichstag Deputy
- 1929–1933: Landtag of Baden Deputy
- 1926–1929: Weinheim City Councilor

Personal details
- Born: 30 September 1897 Weinheim, Grand Duchy of Baden, German Empire
- Died: 9 January 1989 (aged 91) Weinheim, Baden-Württemberg, West Germany

Military service
- Allegiance: German Empire
- Branch/service: Imperial German Army
- Years of service: 1914–1918
- Rank: Vizefeldwebel
- Unit: Reserve Infantry Regiment 109
- Battles/wars: World War I
- Awards: Iron Cross, 2nd class

Walter Friedrich Julius Köhler (30 September 1897 – 9 January 1989) was a German Nazi Party politician who served as the Minister President of Baden in Nazi Germany from 1933 to 1945.

== Early life ==
The son of a colonial supply trader, Köhler was born in Weinheim, attended Volksschule there until 1906 and left the Realgymnasium in his hometown in 1912 after earning his Abitur. For the next two years, Köhler completed a banking apprenticeship in Ladenburg. At the beginning of the First World War he entered the Imperial German Army as a one-year volunteer in Reserve Infantry Regiment 109 and was deployed on the western front from October 1914. He rose to the rank of Vizefeldwebel, was wounded and taken prisoner of war by the British on 1 July 1916. Awarded the Iron Cross, 2nd class, Köhler returned to Weinheim after the end of the war, where he initially worked in his parents' store. In 1918, he joined the right-wing conservative German National People's Party (DNVP) and headed the party's youth organization in Weinheim. In addition, Köhler was a member of the Deutschvölkischer Schutz- und Trutzbund, the largest and most influential antisemitic organization in Germany at the time.

== Early career in the Nazi Party ==
By 1923 Köhler gravitated to the Nazi Party, moving to the Völkisch-Social Bloc, a Nazi front organization, during the period in 1924 when the Nazi Party was banned following the Beer Hall Putsch. On 20 June 1925, he formally rejoined the Nazi Party a few months after its re-establishment in February 1925 (membership number 8,246). He became the founder and Ortsgruppenleiter (Local Group Leader) of the Weinheim local branch. Köhler was an effective organizer and a gifted speaker, growing the local branch into the third largest in Baden. From 1925 to 1927, Köhler was the Kreisleiter (County Leader) in the Weinheim area. At the same time, he was the Weinheim leader of the Sturmabteilung (SA), the Party's paramilitary organization. In November 1926, he was elected to the Weinheim City Council. He continued to develop Weinheim into an early stronghold for the Party, where they always achieved above-average election results. In the 1928 German federal election, Weinheim turned out 12.7% for the Nazis as opposed to their nation-wide polling of 2.6%. In the 1929 Baden state election to the Baden Landtag in October 1929, the party achieved 26.7% in the city as opposed to 7.0% in all of Baden. Köhler was elected to the Baden Landtag in that election and became the chairman of the Nazi Party parliamentary group. In August 1931, Köhler was promoted to Deputy Gauleiter for Baden, under Gauleiter Robert Heinrich Wagner. Between January and March 1933, he served as acting Gauleiter while Wagner was detailed to Party headquarters in Munich.

== Minister President of Baden ==
After the Nazi seizure of power at the national level, they began the process of taking control of the independent state governments. Köhler, in his capacity as acting Gauleiter, on 6 March 1933 issued an ultimatum demanding the resignation of the Baden state government. Five days later, Wagner assumed control as Minister President and formed a cabinet with Köhler heading the Ministry of Finance. Following Wagner's appointment to the newly-created position of Reichsstatthalter (Reich Governor), Köhler on 6 May 1933 succeeded him as Minister President of Baden, as well as head of the combined Ministry of Finance and Economics. In November 1933, Köhler was elected to the Reichstag from electoral constituency 32 (Baden). He would be reelected in 1936 and 1938, serving until the fall of the Nazi regime.

From 1934 Köhler headed the Baden Chamber of Commerce, and from 1943 he held the presidency of the District Chamber of Commerce for the Upper Rhine, which comprised Baden and Alsace. In 1936, he was appointed head of the raw materials distribution department within the Four Year Plan but left this position at his own request in 1937. On 20 April 1937, Prussian Minister President Hermann Göring appointed Köhler to the Prussian State Council. From 1939, Köhler headed the Armaments Command in Baden. After the German occupation and annexation of Alsace in 1940, Wagner was appointed Chief of Civil Administration (CdZ) and Köhler became head of the finance and economic department at the CdZ. In this function, he supported the harsh Germanization policy in Alsace and worked to exploit the Alsatian economy for the service of the German war economy. In the SA, Köhler was promoted in May 1937 to SA-Brigadeführer, in November 1938, to SA-Gruppenführer and, in November 1943, to SA-Obergruppenführer.

Towards the end of the war, Köhler was in Karlsruhe and refused Gauleiter Wagner's order to leave the city in view of the approaching French army. Infuriated, Wagner relieved him of his offices, expelled him from the Party and filed court-martial proceedings against him for high treason. However, he was beyond Wagner's reach, as he was captured by French troops on 4 April 1945.

== Post-war ==
Köhler spent the following three years in internment camps. In October 1948, the denazification tribunal in Karlsruhe classified Köhler as a “lesser offender” and sentenced him to three years in a labor camp, which were considered to have been served by the internment, as well as five years of a professional ban and a fine of 1,500 DM. The public prosecutor appealed and, in a second trial in April 1950, Köhler was classified as an "incriminated person" but no additional sanctions were imposed. Following his release, he worked first as a sales representative, then as head of an insurance agency in Karlsruhe. Walter Köhler died on 9 January 1989 in Weinheim.

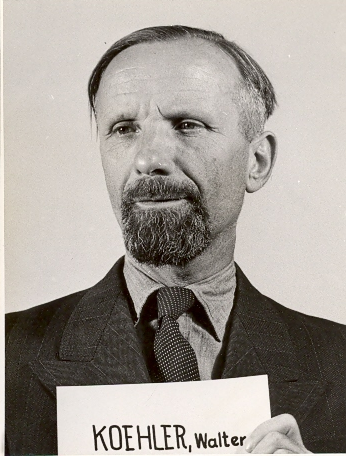
Walter Köhler in Allied custody, c. 1945–1949

Ernst Otto Bräunche, head of the Karlsruhe city archive, came to the following assessment of Köhler in 2000:

Köhler was one of the decisive pioneers of the NSDAP in Baden and thus one of the active "gravediggers of the Weimar Republic" and democracy in Baden. In the Third Reich, Köhler ultimately functioned without any problems in his area of responsibility and thus made a significant contribution to supporting and consolidating the Nazi regime. Even after the Federal Republic had long established and consolidated itself, he was still convinced that democracy had no future.

== Sources ==
- Ernst Otto Bräunche: Walter Köhler]: Prime Minister of Baden - a "decent" and "morally upright" National Socialist? In: City of Weinheim (ed.): The City of Weinheim in the period from 1933 to 1945. (= Weinheimer Geschichtsblatt, No. 38) Weinheim 2000, ISBN 3-923652-12-7, pp. 135–160.
- Deutsches Führerlexikon 1934–1935, pp. 243–244 Retrieved 2 June 2023
- Horst Ferdinand: "Köhler, Walter Friedrich Julius, Nazi politician, businessman." In: "Baden-Württemberg Biographies." Volume II, Kohlhammer, Stuttgart 1999, ISBN 3-17-014117-1, p. 276-280 (Online)
- Klee, Ernst (2007). Das Personenlexikon zum Dritten Reich. Wer war was vor und nach 1945. Frankfurt-am-Main: Fischer-Taschenbuch-Verlag. p. 324 ISBN 978-3-596-16048-8
- Lilla, Joachim (2005). Der Preußische Staatsrat 1921–1933: Ein biographisches Handbuch. Düsseldorf: Droste Verlag. ISBN 978-3-770-05271-4.
- Joachim Lilla, Martin Döring, Andreas Schulz: Extras in uniform. The members of the Reichstag 1933-1945. A biographical handbook. Including the Völkisch and National Socialist Reichstag deputies from May 1924. Droste, Düsseldorf 2004, ISBN 3-7700-5254-4, pp. 322–323.
