= Hermann Röhn =

German Nazi politician (1902–1946)

Deputy Gauleiter, Gau Baden
- In office 1934 – 8 May 1945

Reichstag Deputy
- In office 12 November 1933 – 8 May 1945

Landtag of Baden Deputy
- In office 2 April 1933 – 14 October 1933

Personal details
- Born: 21 December 1902 Heidelberg, Grand Duchy of Baden, German Empire
- Died: 14 August 1946 (aged 43) Fort Ney, France
- Cause of death: Execution by firing squad
- Party: Nazi Party
- Civilian awards: Golden Party Badge

Military service
- Allegiance: Weimar Republic; Nazi Germany
- Branch/service: Reichswehr; German army
- Years of service: 1922–1924; 1939–1940
- Unit: 21st Infantry Regiment
- Battles/wars: World War II
- Military awards: Iron Cross, 2nd class War Merit Cross, 1st class

Hermann Gustav Philip Röhn (21 December 1902 – 14 August 1946) was a German Nazi Party politician who sat as a deputy of the Reichstag from 1933 to 1945. As Deputy Gauleiter of Gau Baden, he was involved in Nazi crimes in occupied Alsace, including Germanization and forced military conscription. After the end of the Second World War, he was tried and convicted of war crimes by France, and was executed by a firing squad.

== Early life ==
Röhn was born in Heidelberg in 1902, and after attending Volksschule, Realschule and a commercial trade school, he completed a commercial apprenticeship from 1920 to 1922. From 25 October 1922 to 31 December 1924, he served with the 21st Infantry Regiment of the Reichswehr. After being discharged from the military, he initially earned his living as an insurance clerk and, from 1925 to 1933, he worked in a pewter foundry owned by his parents.

== Nazi Party career ==
In May 1922, Röhn joined the Nazi Party Ortsgruppe (local group) in Mannheim. Following the lifting of the ban imposed on the Party in the wake of the Beer Hall Putsch, he rejoined it on 17 February 1926 (membership number 30,307). As an early Party member, he later would be awarded the Golden Party Badge. He founded an Ortsgruppe in Heidelberg and, from April 1925 until 1929, he was the SA-Führer of the local Sturmabteilung (SA), the Nazi paramilitary unit. In 1929, Röhn became the Geschäftsführer (business manager) of the Heidelberg local group and, in 1931, he advanced to the post of Kreisleiter (district leader). From 1930 to 1933, he served on the Heidelberg city council.

After the Nazi seizure of power, Röhn was appointed as a deputy of the Baden Landtag from 2 April 1933 until its dissolution by the Nazis on 14 October 1933. At the 12 November 1933 election, Röhn was elected as a deputy to the Reichstag from electoral constituency 32 (Baden). Reelected in 1936 and 1938, he would retain this seat until the fall of the Nazi regime in May 1945. Within the Nazi Party organization, he became chief of staff of the Gau leadership in Baden in the spring of 1933. From 1934, he was Deputy Gauleiter of Gau Baden, under Gauleiter Robert Heinrich Wagner.

During the Second World War, Röhn participated in the Battle of France and earned the Iron Cross, 2nd class and the War Merit Cross, 1st class. Following the defeat and occupation of France in June 1940, Gau Baden was enlarged by the annexation of Alsace in March 1941. A policy of Germanization was introduced, banning the teaching and public speaking of French and restoring former German place names. In August 1942, the Nazis introduced universal conscription in Alsace for men of military age. Röhn coordinated and oversaw the measures necessary to implement these coercive orders.

== Post-war prosecution and execution ==
After Germany's defeat, Röhn was arrested and brought before a French military court in Strasbourg on 23 April 1946 for his involvement in the Germanization policy in Alsace. He was also accused of inciting French citizens to bear arms against France between 1940 and 1942 and of participating in the forced conscription of Frenchmen into the German army from 1942 to 1944. On 3 May 1946, he was sentenced to death along with Wagner and two other Nazi officials. They were executed by a firing squad on 14 August 1946, at Fort Ney near Strasbourg.

== Sources ==
- Hermann Röhn at Landeskunde entdecken online – Baden-Württemberg (LEO-BW)
- Information about Hermann Röhn in the Reichstag database
- Miller, Michael D.; Schulz, Andreas (2012). Gauleiter: The Regional Leaders of the Nazi Party and Their Deputies, 1925–1945. Vol. 1 (Herbert Albrecht – H. Wilhelm Hüttmann). R. James Bender Publishing. ISBN 978-1-932-97021-0.
- Moisel, Claudia (2004). Frankreich und die deutschen Kriegsverbrecher. Göttingen: Wallstein Verlag. ISBN 978-3-835-32059-8.
- Stockhorst, Erich (1985). 5000 Köpfe: Wer War Was im 3. Reich. Arndt. ISBN 978-3-887-41116-9.
