= 1929 Baden state election =

- 27 October 1929

All 88 seats in the Landtag 45 seats needed for a majority
- Registered: 1,537,962
- Turnout: 61.4%
	First party	Second party	Third party
Party	Centre	SPD	DVP
Last election	36.8%, 28 seats	20.8%, 16 seats	9.5%, 7 seats
Seats won	34	18	7
Seat change	▲6	▲2	Steady
Popular vote	341,754	187,087	74,340
Percentage	36.7%	20.1%	8.0%
Swing	▼0.1pp	▼0.7pp	▼1.5pp
	Fourth party	Fifth party	Sixth party
Party	NSDAP	DDP	KPD
Last election	1.2%, 0 seats	8.7%, 6 seats	6.1%, 4 seats
Seats won	6	6	5
Seat change	▲6	Steady	▲1
Popular vote	65,121	62,344	55,143
Percentage	7.0%	6.7%	5.9%
Swing	▲5.8pp	▼2.0pp	▼0.2pp
Government before election
Josef Schmitt
Z–SPD
Government after election
Josef Schmitt
Z–SPD

The 1929 Baden state election was held on 27 October 1929 to elect the 88 members of the Landtag of the Republic of Baden.

== Campaign ==
The Rechtsblock coalition formed by the German National People's Party (DNVP) and Agricultural League broke apart in 1928. Many of the Agricultural League members joined the Nazi Party. The Nazis launched their election campaign in March 1929.

The Nazis won six seats in the election and Walter Köhler was selected to serve as their delegation chairman. This granted the party members that could not be arrested due to parliamentary immunity. The Nazi's best Amtsbezirke performance was in Kehl with 32%. 42.2% of the new votes for the Nazis came from Heidelberg, Karlsruhe, Mannheim, Pforzheim, and Weinheim. The Bezirk Tauberbischofsheim, which was 81.8% Catholic, gave 70.3% of its vote to the Centre.

== Results ==
Graph of the party split among 88 seats.
Party	Votes	%	Seats	±
Centre Party	341,754	36.66	34	+6
Social Democratic Party	187,087	20.07	18	+2
German People's Party	74,340	7.97	7	0
Nazi Party	65,121	6.98	6	+6
German Democratic Party	62,344	6.69	6	0
Communist Party of Germany	55,143	5.91	5	+1
Reich Party of the German Middle Class	35,605	3.82	3	0
Evangelical People's Service	35,317	3.79	3	New
German National People's Party	34,079	3.66	3	–5
Baden Farmers' Party	28,267	3.03	3	New
People's Justice Party	6,680	0.72	0	New
Christian Social Reich Party	5,086	0.55	0	New
Left Communists	1,530	0.16	0	New
Total	932,353	100.00	88	+16
Valid votes	932,353	98.74		
Invalid/blank votes	11,888	1.26		
Total votes	944,241	100.00		
Registered voters/turnout	1,538,690	61.37		
Source: Schröder, Gonschior

== Aftermath ==
This was the last democratic election in Baden before the Nazi seizure of power. The SDP and Centre coalition government dissolved on 30 November 1932, due to disagreements over a concordat between the Catholic Church and Baden. The Centre and DVP attempted to form a coalition with the Nazis without dissolving the landtag, but the Nazis rejected it and wanted new elections. A Centre and DVP minority government was formed on 10 January 1933.

Robert Heinrich Wagner was appointed Reichkomissar of Baden on 9 March 1933, replacing the position of president. A new landtag consisting of 30 Nazis, 17 Centre, 8 SPD, and 2 DNVP convened once on 9 June 1933 to give the executive legislative powers. Wagner appointed Köhler as president on 6 May.

=== 1933 seat reallocation ===
On 31 March 1933, the Provisional Law on the Coordination of the States with the Reich was enacted, leading to the reallocation of the Landtag seats based on the results of the March 1933 German federal election in Württemberg.

Graph of the party split among 63 seats.
Party	Seats	±
Nazi Party	30	+24
Centre Party	17	–17
Social Democratic Party	8	–10
Communist Party	6	+1
Black-White-Red Struggle Front	2	–1
Total	63	–25
Source: Schröder, Gonschior

== Works cited ==
- Exner, Konrad (2016). "Die politischen und wirtschaftlichen Ereignisse der Republik Baden in der Zeit der Weimarer Republik". Badische Heimat. 96 (2). Landesverein Badische Heimat: 291–300.
- Faris, Ellsworth (1975). "Takeoff Point for the National Socialist Party: The Landtag Election in Baden, 1929". Central European History. 8 (2). Cambridge University Press: 140–71. doi:10.2307/4545738. JSTOR 4545738.
- Grill, Johnpeter (1983). The Nazi Movement in Baden, 1920-1945. University of North Carolina Press. ISBN 0807814725.
