= Gau Baden =

Regional subdivision of the Nazi Party

Gau Baden Gau Baden–Elsass
- Gau of Nazi Germany
- 1925–1945
- Flag Coat of arms

- Gau Baden on the far left, bordering France in 1944
- Capital: Karlsruhe (1933–40) Strasbourg (1940–45)
- Government
- Gauleiter
  - 1925–1945: Robert Wagner
- History
  - Establishment: 22 March 1925
  - Disestablishment: 8 May 1945
Preceded by	Succeeded by
Republic of Baden; France	Republic of Baden; France
- Today part of: France; Germany

The Gau Baden, renamed Gau Baden–Alsace (German: Gau Baden-Elsaß) on 22 March 1941, was a de facto administrative division of Nazi Germany from 1933 to 1945 in the German state of Baden and, from 1940 onward, in Alsace (German: Elsaß). Before that, from 1925 to 1933, it was the regional subdivision of the Nazi Party in that area.

== State ==
The Nazi Gau (plural Gaue) system was originally established in a Nazi Party conference on 22 May 1926 in order to improve administration of the party structure. From 1933 onward, after the Nazi seizure of power, the Gaue increasingly replaced the German states as administrative subdivisions in Germany. In 1940, after Germany occupied the French region of Alsace, Gau Baden incorporated the two Alsatian départements of Bas-Rhin and Haut-Rhin, becoming Baden-Elsass. The seat of the 'Gau administration was originally Karlsruhe, but moved to Strasbourg after the German occupation of France.

At the head of each Gau stood a Gauleiter, a position which became increasingly more powerful, especially after the outbreak of the World War II, with little interference from above. Local Gauleiter often held government positions as well as party ones and were in charge of, among other things, propaganda and surveillance and, from September 1944 onward, the Volkssturm and the defense of the Gau.

== NSDAP in Baden ==
=== Early history ===
Members of the Deutschvölkischer Schutz- und Trutzbund formed an affiliate of the Nazi Party in Stuttgart, Württemberg on 8 May 1920 that was recognized on 4 June. Leaders in Stuttgart help expand the party into Baden. The first Baden affiliate was formed in Pforzheim on 28 October. Ernst Ulshöfer, one of the founders of the Stuttgart affiliate, was the leader of the Pforzheim Nazis in 1921. Ulshöfer formed an affiliate in Mannheim on 4 February 1921, and became its leader in May 1922.

Between 13 April and 28 August 1922, 178 people joined the Baden party. Two of these members were female and five were unskilled workers. The party was banned in Baden on 4 July 1922. Several people were convicted for being members of the party in 1923, but their convictions were overturned as the court ruled that the government's order only banned the party and not membership in it. Nazis remained active in Baden by forming front organizations. The Nazis had eighteen local affiliates in 1923.

=== Reformation ===
The party was banned following the unsuccessful Beer Hall Putsch of November 1923. The German Party (Deutsche Partei) was formed by Nazis in 1924, and held its first conference on 20 January. Erwin Müller was the first leader of the German Party. Walter Köhler left the German National People's Party (DNVP) and joined the German Party. The German Party became an affiliate of the Nazi Party after the ban on it was lifted in 1925. Nazis in southern Baden joined the German Völkisch Freedom Party (DVFP).

The Völkisch organizations in Baden united into the Völkisch Soziale Block for the May 1924 German federal election. Most of the candidates were from the DVFP. The block received 4.8% of the votes in the election, and 47.9% of its votes came from cities with populations over 10,000. The German Party became affiliated with the National Socialist Freedom Movement (NSFP).

The Völkisch Jugend was formed in January 1924, and later became the Schlageterbund. This later became the Sturmabteilung (SA) in Baden. The SA membership was estimated by the Baden police to be at 2,400 in 1930, 5,000 in October 1931, and 10,000 by 1932. Heinrich Himmler ordered the creation of the Baden Schutzstaffel (SS) in March 1929, and placed it under the leadership of Otto Heidt. A branch of the Hitler Youth was formed in Baden in 1927.

Robert Heinrich Wagner, a career officer in the Reichswehr, was dismissed from the service and imprisoned for his involvement in Adolf Hitler's unsuccessful Beer Hall Putsch. He returned to Baden in 1924, and joined the Schlageterbund. He met with Adolf Hitler in February 1925, and received permission to form a Nazi affiliate in Baden. Wagner was appointed as the Nazi Gauleiter of Gau Baden, the only person to hold that position, on 25 March 1925, and served until 1945. His deputies were Karl Lenz (1926–1931), Köhler (1931–1933) and Hermann Röhn (1934–1945). On 15 April 1925, Wagner published a pamphlet calling for the creation of a Nazi Party in Baden. The Baden Minister of the Interior, Adam Remmele, lifted the ban on the party stating that the Nazis were politically irrelevant.

Völkisch leaders who opposed Wagner joined the DVFP. Most district leaders of the NSFP rejoined the Nazis except for three in southern Baden who joined the DVFP instead. The Nazi party grew slowly from 31 local affiliates in 1925 to 40 in 1927. They were poorly organized and Erich Ludendorff, their candidate in the 1925 presidential election, only received 513 votes in Baden.

Der Führer, the main organ of the Nazi Party in Baden, was first published on 5 November 1927, and the first issue sold 446 copies. The paper was not financially successful until 1929, and gave advertising space for free.

=== Rise ===
Three Nazis, including Köhler, were elected to the Weinheim city council in 1926. Nazis were elected to local offices in ten communities in 1926. At the 1928 German federal election, the majority of the party's support came from rural Protestant regions in the north of Baden. The Nazis won six seats in the Landtag at the 1929 Baden state election and Köhler was selected to serve as the delegation chairman. These party leaders were protected from arrest due to their parliamentary immunity. Hermann Teutsch, the leader of the Protestant Christian Social People's Service in Baden, joined the Nazis in June 1931.

The party conducted an average of 150 rallies per month from January to June 1930, in the run-up to the federal election that year. The party's local affiliates grew from 48 in May 1928, to 70 in February 1930, and 200 in August 1930. Wagner froze new membership between 19 November 1930 and 21 January 21 1931, to allow for the assimilation of new members after over 5,000 people joined the party in 1930. Their vote total grew by over 150,000 between the 1929 state and 1930 federal elections. Around 2,000 Nazis were elected in the 1930 local elections. The party won seven Reichstag seats in the July 1932 federal election and eleven seats in the March 1933 federal election.

=== Takeover ===
The Baden coalition government of the Social Democrats (SPD) and the Centre Party dissolved on 30 November 1932, due to disagreements over a concordat between the Catholic Church and Baden. The Centre and the German People's Party (DVP) attempted to form a coalition with the Nazis without dissolving the Landtag, but the Nazis rejected this and pushed for new elections. Instead, the Centre and DVP formed a minority government on 10 January 1933.

Following the Nazi seizure of power at the national level, Hitler appointed Wagner Reichskommissar of Baden on 9 March 1933, replacing the position of president. A law passed on 7 April 1933 created the position of Reichsstatthalter (Reich Governor) to which Wagner was appointed on 5 May. It granted him the power to create a government, and he appointed Köhler as minister-president and finance minister and Karl Pflaumer as minister of interior on 6 May. Wagner offered to let the DNVP delegates join the Nazi Party, but Franz Xaver Schwarz vetoed the idea. A newly reconfigured Landtag consisting of 30 Nazis, 17 Centre, 8 SPD, and 2 DNVP convened for a single session on 9 June 1933 to grant legislative powers to the executive. This enabling act was passed with the support of the Centre to obtain the required two-thirds majority, only after Wagner threatened them with reprisal at a meeting on May 16.

Municipal council seats were reallocated based on the March 1933 federal election results. Opposition parties united to elect non-Nazi mayors in some smaller communities, such as Staufen and Leinen, but the Ministry of the Interior negated the results and appointed Nazis in their place. Pflaumer cancelled all upcoming mayoral elections in January 1934. By September 1933, 25% of mayoral posts were newly held by Nazis.

Party membership by year
Year	Number	Percentage of population	Reference
January 1933	~24,000		
1935	78,301	3.2%	
March 1938	168,000	7%	
1942	224,719	9.3%	

Daniel Nussbaum, an SDP Landtag deputy, killed a police officer that was attempting to arrest him on 17 March 1933. Wagner had SDP and Communist deputies arrested and left-wing newspapers and organizations shut down. Political prisoners were sent to concentration camps. All non-Nazi political parties were disbanded between 1 June and 5 July 1933. The Landtag was dissolved in October 1933 and no further state elections were scheduled. Der Führer was made the official publisher of state and administrative news. Seeking to preserve state power in the face of ever expanding Reich control, Köhler was critical of the expanding federal power when the Baden Ministry of Justice was absorbed into the Reich Ministry of Justice in 1935.

=== Government persecution of the Jews ===
In 1933, Wagner ordered all Jews removed from state and municipal offices. By 1936, 189 Jewish teachers were removed, and the remaining 58 were assigned to teach only Jewish students. An official boycott against Jewish businesses was launched on 31 March 1933. On 3 March 1934, a court in Karlsruhe became the first one in Germany to grant a divorce based on Nazi racial policies.

When the Nazis seized power, 20,617 Jews lived in Baden but this declined to 6,437 by October 1940. Between 1933 and 1935, 12% of Baden's Jews emigrated and its Jewish population declined by one-third between 1933 and 1937. On 22 October 1940, almost all of the remaining Jews in Baden, except for those outside the state at the time or in mixed-marriages, were expelled to France aboard seven trains. The remaining 820 Jews were either deported as well or sent to extermination camps. Property belonging to Jews was seized by the state and synagogues were converted into warehouses. The Natzweiler-Struthof concentration camp was located in the Alsace region of the Gau.

== Aftermath ==
After the end of the war, Wagner was captured and extradited to France for trial. He was convicted by a military court and executed by firing squad on 14 August 1946 in Strasbourg for his crimes during the occupation of Alsace.

In the post-war occupation of Germany by the Allies, Baden was split between two states in late 1945: Württemberg-Baden and South Baden. In April 1952, they were reunited into the state of Baden-Württemberg.

== See also ==
- Gauliga Baden, the highest association football league in the Baden region of the Gau from 1933 to 1945
- Gauliga Elsaß, the highest association football league in the Alsace region of the Gau from 1940 to 1945

== Works cited ==
- Exner, Konrad (2016). "Die politischen und wirtschaftlichen Ereignisse der Republik Baden in der Zeit der Weimarer Republik". Badische Heimat. 96 (2). Landesverein Badische Heimat: 291–300.
- Faris, Ellsworth (1975). "Takeoff Point for the National Socialist Party: The Landtag Election in Baden, 1929". Central European History. 8 (2). Cambridge University Press: 140–71. doi:10.1017/S0008938900017842. JSTOR 4545738.
- Grill, Johnpeter (1983). The Nazi Movement in Baden, 1920-1945. University of North Carolina Press. ISBN 0807814725.
- Rinderle, Walter; Norling, Bernard (1993). The Nazi Impact on a German Village. University Press of Kentucky. ISBN 0813117941.
