= Walter Kohler =

Walter Kohler may refer to:

- Walter J. Kohler Sr. (1875–1940), governor of Wisconsin (1929–1931) and president of the Kohler Company
- Walter J. Kohler Jr. (1904–1976), governor of Wisconsin, 1951–1957
- Walter Köhler (1897–1989), German Nazi Party politician
