= Brunswick State Electoral Association =

German electoral alliance

The Brunswick State Electoral Association (German: Braunschweigischer Landeswahlverband, BLWV) was a regional electoral alliance active between 1918 and 1922 in the Free State of Brunswick during the Weimar Republic.

== History ==
The Association was founded in 1918 by August Hampe as an alliance of conservative bourgeois parties, consisting of the German People's Party (DVP), the German National People's Party (DNVP) and the Welf–oriented Brunswick Lower–Saxon Party (Braunschweigisch-Niedersächsische Partei, BNP). The alliance contested the December 1918 Brunswick state election and finished second, receiving 26% of the vote and winning 16 seats in the 60-seat Landtag.

In the federal elections on 19 January 1919 the Association finished third in Brunswick with 23% of the vote. However, this only represented 0.2% of the national vote and the alliance won only one seat in the Weimar National Assembly, taken by Hampe.

This was followed by the 1920 Brunswick state election, in which the Association emerged as the largest faction, receiving 37% of the vote and winning 23 seats. In the next state election in 1922 the Association, now also including the Völkische Party, remained the largest, receiving 38% of the vote and retaining its 23 seats.

The Association continued to function as a parliamentary group in the Landtag until 23 May 1922, when it split into the two parliamentary groups, DVP–Wirtschaftsverband (Economic Union) and Bürgerliche Vereinigung (Civil Association).

== See also ==
- Brunswick Landtag elections in the Weimar Republic
