= 1913 Baden state election =

- 21 October 1913

All 73 seats in the Landtag 37 seats needed for a majority
- Turnout: 333,744
	First party	Second party	Third party
Party	Centre	NlP	SPD
Seats won	30	20	13
Popular vote	116,234	81,437	74,328
Percentage	34.8%	24.4%	22.3%
	Fourth party	Fifth party
Party	FVp	DKP
Seats won	5	5 (Note: The German Agrarian League and German Conservative Party participated in an electoral alliance. The Conservatives received three seats and the Agrarian League received two seats.)
Popular vote	30,311	30,559
Percentage	9.1%	9.2%
Government before election
Alexander von Dusch
Government after election
Alexander von Dusch

The 1913 Baden state election was held on 21 October 1913, to elect the 73 members of the lower house of the landtag of the Grand Duchy of Baden.

== Background ==
The landtag of the Grand Duchy of Baden was divided into an upper and lower house, of which the lower house was directly elected. Baden was one of the most liberal areas in the German Empire. The National Liberal Party (NLP) controlled the bureaucracy and politics of Baden during the 1800s. In 1904, legislation allowing Secret ballots and the Direct election of the lower house was passed. The Social Democratic Party (SPD) and Centre Party grew after 1904. The NLP and Centre formed a coalition after the 1913 election.

Edmund Rebmann, the chair of the National Liberal Party of Baden, was worried about the growing strength of the Centre Party in southern Germany.

== Results ==
Around 50,000 citizens were ineligible to vote due to residency requirements. Right-wing parties were able to undo their losses in the 1909 election. The German Agrarian League and German Conservative Party participated in an electoral alliance. The Conservatives received three seats and the Agrarian League received two seats.

Party	Votes	%	Seats
Centre Party	116,234	34.83	30
National Liberal Party	81,437	24.40	20
Social Democratic Party	74,328	22.27	13
Progressive People's Party	30,311	9.08	5
German Conservative Party	30,559	9.16	5
Others	875	0.26	0
Total	333,744	100.00	73
Valid votes	333,744	99.23	
Invalid/blank votes	2,606	0.77	
Total votes	336,350	100.00	
Registered voters/turnout	333,744	100.78	

== Works cited ==
- "Deutschland vor 1918 Landtagswahlen Großherzogtum Baden". Wahlen in Deutschland. Archived from the original on 8 October 2025.
- Grill, Johnpeter (1983). The Nazi Movement in Baden, 1920-1945. University of North Carolina Press. ISBN 0807814725.
- Zangerl, Carl (1977). "Courting the Catholic Vote: The Center Party in Baden, 1903–13". Central European History. 10 (3). Cambridge University Press. doi:10.2307/4545803. JSTOR 4545803.
- Schmidgall, Markus (2012). Die Revolution 1918/19 in Baden. Karlsruhe Institute of Technology. ISBN 9783866447271.
