= Robert Heinrich Wagner =

German Nazi Party official and politician (1895–1946)

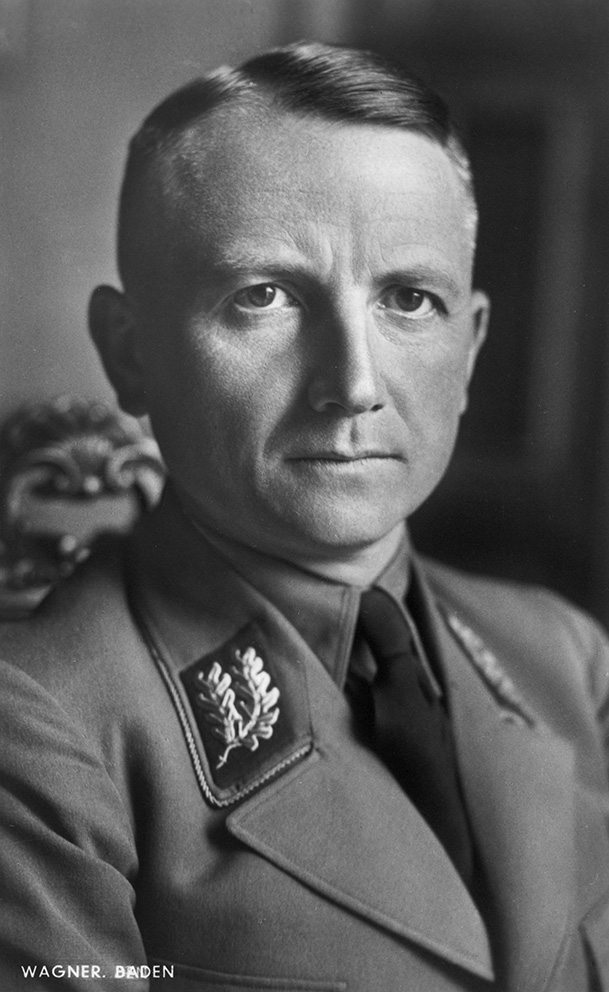
- Wagner in 1938

Gauleiter of Gau Baden (from 22 March 1941, Gau Baden-Elsaß)
- In office 25 March 1925 – 8 May 1945
- Deputy: Karl Lenz (1926–31); Walter Köhler (1931–33); Hermann Röhn (1934–45)
- Preceded by: Office established
- Succeeded by: Office abolished

Reichsstatthalter of Baden
- In office 5 May 1933 – 8 May 1945
- Preceded by: Office established
- Succeeded by: Office abolished

Chief of Civil Administration for Alsace
- In office 2 August 1940 – 23 November 1944
- Preceded by: Office established
- Succeeded by: Office abolished

Personal details
- Born: Robert Heinrich Backfisch; 13 October 1895 Eberbach, Grand Duchy of Baden, German Empire
- Died: 14 August 1946 (aged 50) Fort Ney, near Strasbourg, France
- Cause of death: Execution by firing squad
- Known for: Forced reintegration of Alsace into the German Reich

Military service
- Allegiance: German Empire; Weimar Republic
- Branch/service: Imperial German Army; Reichswehr
- Years of service: 1914–1924
- Rank: Oberleutnant
- Unit: 110th Grenadier Regiment; 110th Reserve Regiment; 113th Defense Regiment; 14th Infantry Regiment
- Battles/wars: World War I November Revolution; Beer Hall Putsch
- Awards: Iron Cross, 1st and 2nd class

Robert Heinrich Wagner, born as Robert Heinrich Backfisch (13 October 1895 – 14 August 1946), was a German Nazi Party official and politician who served as Gauleiter and Reichsstatthalter of Baden, and Chief of Civil Administration for Alsace during the German occupation of France in World War II. Following the end of the Second World War, Wagner was extradited to France where he was tried, sentenced to death and executed by firing squad.

== Early life ==
Robert Wagner was born in Lindach in the Grand Duchy of Baden in the German Empire. He was the second of five children of Peter Backfisch and Catherine Wagner, a farming family. After attending volksschule in Lindach, he enrolled in 1910 in a preparatory school in Heidelberg and later in a teacher normal school there.

=== First World War ===
At the outbreak of the First World War, Wagner broke off his teacher training and abandoned his studies (which he never finished) and became a one-year volunteer in the Imperial German Army. He was assigned to the 110th (2nd Baden) Grenadier Regiment "Emperor William I.". After being wounded and hospitalized in July 1915, he attended reserve officer candidate training courses and was commissioned as a Leutnant of the reserves in February 1916. Assigned as a platoon leader with the 110th Reserve Regiment from July 1916 through the end of the war, he was again wounded in a poison gas attack in June 1917. He fought on the western front, including operations in Flanders, the Battle of Loretto, the Battle of Verdun, the Battle of the Somme, and the Champagne campaign, experiencing some of the war's bloodiest battles. He was decorated for bravery with the Iron Cross, 2nd and 1st class (the latter in November 1917), and also received the Wound Badge in black and the Knight's Cross Second Class of the Order of the Zähringer Lion with Swords.

Wagner was discharged in December 1918 after the war had ended, and remained without a completed vocational qualification for life. He later described the armistice as a "stab in the back" by the wavering home front and, from his later perspective, said that this experience strengthened his hatred of "November criminals", leftists, and deserters.

In February 1919, Wagner joined the 2nd Baden Volunteer Battalion, with whom he participated in the suppression of revolutionary unrest in Mannheim and Karlsruhe. This unit was transferred to Reichswehr 113th Defense Regiment in March 1920. In January 1921, he was transferred to the 14th Infantry Regiment, based in Konstanz. Also at this time, he officially had his name changed to Wagner, taking the maiden name of his mother. The reason for the name change from his father's (Backfisch, which means "teenage girl" (literally "fried fish")) was probably to avoid teasing by his fellow officers.

== Hitler meeting ==
In September 1923, by now an Oberleutnant, he was posted to the Central School of Infantry in Munich, then the principal officer training facility in Germany. While in Munich, Wagner met Adolf Hitler and Erich Ludendorff and was immediately captivated by them. The meeting came through his friendship with Ludendorff's stepson, Heinz Pernet. Wagner took part in the Beer Hall Putsch on 9 November 1923, leading his infantry students to the Bürgerbräukeller. On 26 February 1924 he stood trial with Hitler and eight other men for their part in the putsch. Wagner was convicted on 1 April and sentenced to 15 months incarceration, of which he served 11 weeks in Landsberg prison. He was dismissed from the Reichswehr on 24 May. During the time that the Nazi Party was banned, Wagner remained active as a speaker at political gatherings, and was arrested six times for political rowdyism.

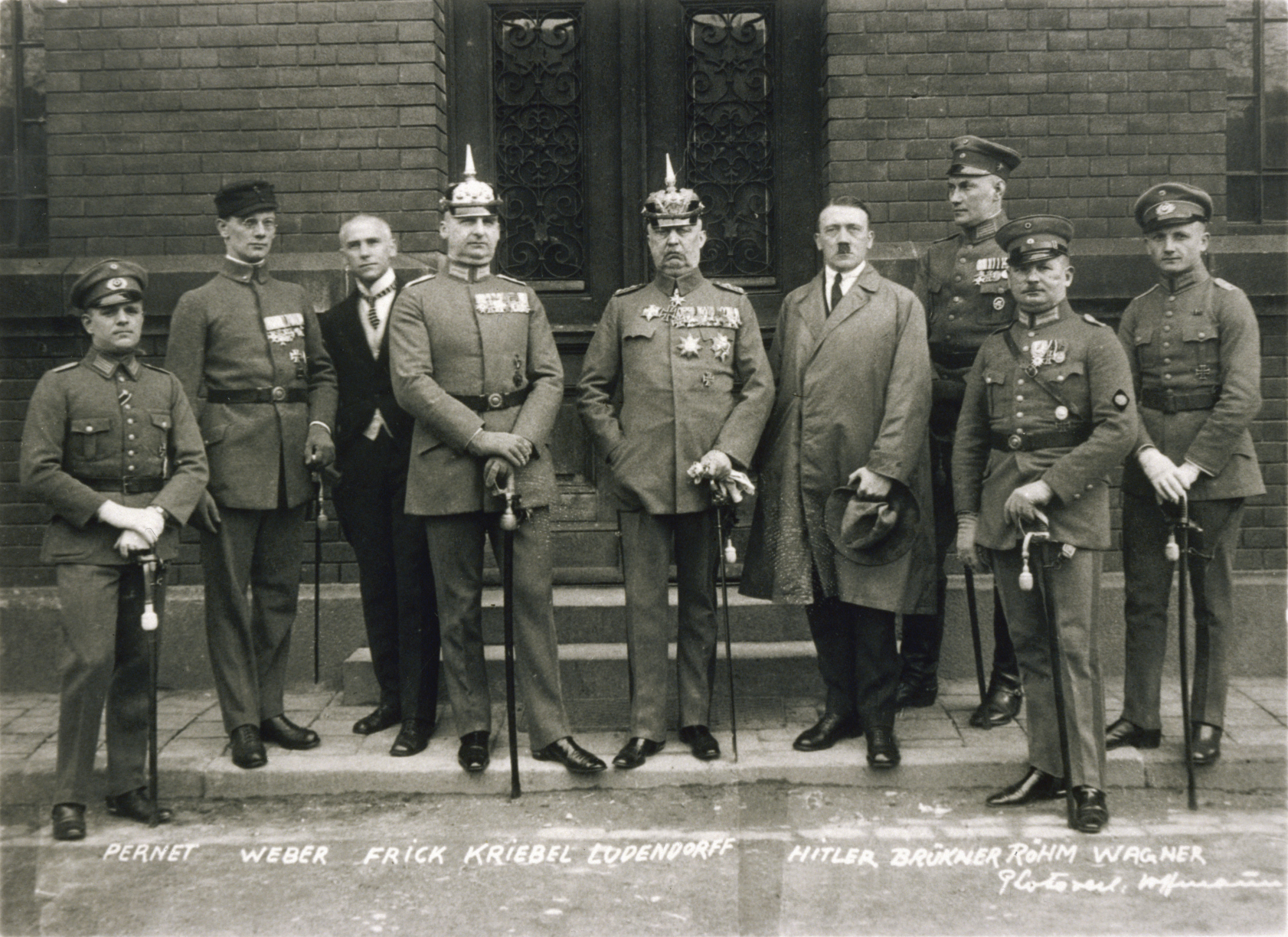
Nine of the defendants in the Beer Hall Putsch treason trial on 1 April 1924. Robert Wagner stands at the far right.

== Nazi Party career ==
When the Nazi Party was reestablished in February 1925, Wagner immediately joined (membership number 11,540). On 25 March 1925 he was named Gauleiter of Baden. In 1927, he became the publisher of a Nazi propaganda newspaper, Der Führer. At one point in 1928 he was imprisoned for two months due to an offensive article he ran. In March 1929 he was charged with libel in Freiburg, but was acquitted. In October 1929, he was elected to the Baden Landtag. Another libel case in 1930 resulted in an acquittal on appeal. From December 1932 through March 1933 he was temporarily transferred to the Party headquarters at the Brown House, Munich as Deputy to Robert Ley and head of the Hauptpersonalamt (Main Personnel Office).

Following the Nazi seizure of power, Wagner was elected on 5 March 1933 to the Reichstag for electoral constituency 32, Baden and retained this seat until the fall of the Nazi regime in May 1945. Resuming his Gauleiter position, on 8 March he was sent back to take control of the Baden state government as Reichskommissar. When the duly elected cabinet resigned on 11 March, Wagner assumed control as Minister-President and Minister of the Interior. On 5 April he issued a decree banning all non-Aryans from public service employment. Turning over the premiership to Walter Köhler, on 5 May he assumed the new, more powerful position of Reichsstatthalter (Reich Governor) of Baden, thus uniting under his control the highest party and governmental offices in his jurisdiction. On 30 January 1936, Wagner was made a Gruppenführer in the National Socialist Motor Corps (NSKK) and on 30 January 1939 was promoted to NSKK-Obergruppenführer. A dedicated Nazi, Wagner carried out the Party policies regarding persecution of the Jews, enforcement of the Nuremberg Laws, the pogrom of Kristallnacht and persecution against the churches.

== Second World War and Chief of Civil Administration in Alsace ==
Shortly after the outbreak of the Second World War, Wagner was named to the Defense Committees of Wehrkreise (Military Districts) V and XII, in which parts of his Gau were located. After the fall of France, Germany incorporated Alsace (Elsaß) into the Greater German Reich and on 2 August 1940 Wagner became Chief of Civil Administration for the region. On 22 March 1941, his Gau was renamed Gau Baden-Elsaß. In a meeting with Hitler on 20 June 1940, also attended by Josef Bürckel, the Chief of Civil Administration for Lorraine, Hitler informed them that he wanted a total Germanization of the two occupied French areas within ten years by any means necessary. Wagner immediately embarked on an aggressive Germanization campaign in Alsace, vowing to achieve this goal in half the time. He proclaimed a ban on speaking French in public. Also, he ordered the restoration of the old German place names that existed prior to 1918, and persons with French given names were required to change them to their German equivalents. Schools were required to teach Nazi race theories, and he established mandatory units of Hitler Youth and the League of German Girls to indoctrinate the Alsatian youth. He also mandated compulsory membership in the Reich Labor Service for working-age Alsatians. Wagner also personally established the Schirmeck-Vorbrück concentration camp, where by 1942 about 1,400 prisoners were incarcerated.

On 25 August 1942, Wagner issued a decree ordering the conscription into the Wehrmacht of all Alsatian men of military service age. This policy was very unpopular and had the effect of increasing opposition to the German occupation. In February 1943, Wagner ordered the execution of 12 men from Ballersdorf who tried to avoid compulsory military duty by attempting to cross into nearby Switzerland.

Wagner also embarked on a campaign to rid Alsace of Jews, earning the nickname the Butcher of Alsace (Schlächter vom Elsaß). On 22 October, he initiated a massive deportation of Jews to areas in unoccupied France (Vichy France) with seven trainloads of Jews being rounded up and deported from Alsace with no advance notice. Their property and possessions were confiscated. On 22 October 1940 he reported to Berlin: "Baden ist als erster Gau judenfrei." — Baden is the first Gau to be free of Jews. The Jews expelled from both Baden and Alsace were housed under cruel conditions in the Gurs internment camp at the foot of the Pyrenees. Some 2,000 were deported to the Majdanek and Auschwitz concentration camps and murdered in 1942. Of the 4,464 Jews sent to the Camp Gurs, fewer than 800 survived.

On 16 November 1942, the jurisdiction of Reich Defense Commissioners was changed from the Wehrkreis to the Gau level, and Wagner was appointed Defense Commissioner for his Gau. He assumed responsibility for civil defense, air defense and evacuation measures, as well as for managing wartime rationing and suppression of black market activity. On 25 September 1944, Wagner was made commander of the Nazi militia units (Volkssturm) in his Gau. As the invading Allied forces approached Alsace, Wagner fled from Strasbourg across the Rhine river on 23 November 1944. Allied forces invaded Baden in the spring of 1945, and Wagner continued to offer military resistance, mobilizing Volkssturm battalions and distributing leaflets calling for acts of sabotage and partisan uprisings by Werwolf units in areas already occupied by the Allies. He threatened the death penalty to anyone that tried to flee. Following the scorched earth policy detailed in Hitler's Nero Decree, he ordered cities in Baden to destroy their infrastructure to hinder the advance of the Allies. Karlsruhe, the capital, fell to the First French Army on 4 April 1945, and Wagner fled south to Konstanz. Reportedly, he tried to cross into Switzerland, but was turned back by border guards.

== Capture, trial and death ==
On 29 April 1945, Wagner went into hiding, posing as a farmhand near Tuttlingen. Finally, on 29 July 1945 he turned himself in to American forces at Stuttgart, who handed him over to the French authorities in early 1946. Wagner was brought to trial from 23 April to 3 May 1946, convicted and sentenced to death by the Permanent Military Tribunal in Strasbourg. The sentence was carried out by firing squad on 14 August 1946. Wagner remained a loyal Nazi to the end, as his last words before the execution show: "Long live Greater Germany, long live Adolf Hitler, long live National Socialism."

On 1 September 1950, Wagner was posthumously classified as a major offender (Category I) by the denazification court in Baden.

== Sources ==
- Broszat, Martin (1981). The Hitler State: The Foundation and Development of the Internal Structure of the Third Reich. New York: Longman Inc. ISBN 978-0-582-48997-4.
- Höffkes, Karl (1986). Hitlers Politische Generale. Die Gauleiter des Dritten Reiches: ein biographisches Nachschlagewerk. Tübingen: Grabert-Verlag. ISBN 3-87847-163-7.
- Miller, Michael D.; Schulz, Andreas (2021). Gauleiter: The Regional Leaders of the Nazi Party and Their Deputies, 1925–1945. Vol. 3 (Fritz Sauckel – Hans Zimmermann). Fonthill Media. ISBN 978-1-781-55826-3.
