= Systemic development =

Systemic-Anticipatory-Learning-Skills

Systemic development is a process of thinking about development which uses a systems thinking approach to create a solution to a social, environmental, and economic stress which the world is suffering from.

== Overview ==
Development can be a combination of multiple disciplines. Sustainable development focuses on a balance of environmental, economic, and social.

The core approach of systemic development is a process for thinking holistically while addressing complex issues and progressing towards a mutual goal with high participation rates. The process encompasses comprehension of current activities and future needs from a holistic perspective. For success, it is essential that the process moves from an integrated assessment to a sustainable assessment. The perspective must consider the many facets of the current and proposed development including the economic, social, environmental, political and ecological aspects. The idea behind a systemic development approach can be applied to many disciplines, similar to sustainable development. Systemic development is practice rather than sustainability, which is an end state.

== History ==
General Systems Theory (GST) laid the foundation to systemic thinking. Ludwig Von Bertalanffy was known as the founder of the original principles of GST. Prior to 1968, when GST was introduced in Bertalanffy’s book, General System Theory: Foundations, Development, Applications, the traditional approach to development used linear thinking or cause-and-effect thinking. GST was influenced by many different types of theories such as “Chaos theory, complexity theory, catastrophe theory, cybernetics, fuzzy set theory, and learning matrices” In 1990, Peter Senge, author of The Fifth Discipline, wove systemic thinking approach into development.

== Concepts ==
The integration of ontology, methodology, epistemology, and axiology has formed an outline for GST. Together, these concepts and philosophies contribute to the theory of systemic development.

=== Ontological ===
Ontology is the most basic fundamental tool. In a systemic development approach, the first step is to define the boundaries, thresholds, and stakeholders. Understanding what is, is crucial to understand the layers of complexity of the development needs.

=== Methodological ===
Methodology in systemic development must consider all variables, values, and sustainability principles, and aim to ensure that no elements have been neglected. It is important to ensure completeness, comprehensiveness, and transparency of the assessment. Mutual feedback and interactions between stakeholders should be modeled and assessed using carefully designed specific methodologies.

=== Epistemological ===
Epistemology stresses how dialogue and communication by the stakeholders are the key tools to systemic development. This is when the verification and confirmation of the facets of the development process are discovered. Insight from each stakeholder is important to enhance and broaden the perspective of all involved. It is essential to take these viewpoints into consideration because they influence the process, the trends, the drivers of change, and the interactions between the parts. It is during this phase that learning is accomplished.

=== Axiological ===
Axiologology emphasizes the ethical and aesthetic responsibility during the development process. It is important because the solution manifested by the systemic development process needs to represent the values of the represented stakeholders.

== Framework ==
=== Holistic Thinking ===
To successfully achieve development through a systems approach, holistic thinking is necessary. A holistic approach to a system thinks about each variable, the space between the variables and what defines the variable. “It’s the sum of the interaction of its parts” In this process each individual must learn from each other to understand the whole system in a multidimensional way to find a solution. To think about development with a systemic lens, one needs to be able to see the whole instead of parts and understand the relationship between the parts, the way the parts move, what drives the behavior of the parts, what influences the flow or direction, and to understand why there are no more or no fewer parts. The many factors that make up the whole can be a complex system.

=== Stakeholders ===
Including many diverse stakeholders helps each individual to grow their own perspective, gain an understanding of others and to increase their creativity. Systemic involvement must strive for a transdisciplinary approach instead of a multidisciplinary or interdisciplinary approach to achieve successful development. Transdisciplinary allows for the integration of methodologies and epistemologies through collaboration of the different stakeholders. Including more perspectives in the loop will increase the chance of a successful solution.

=== Communication and Learning ===
The foundation of systemic development, systems thinking, when applied, creates knowledge which leads to expanded knowledge, which leads to success. Dialog is an essential tool for sharing knowledge and translating it into action. Communication can provide feedback and insight about “system, culture, practices, and artifacts and about the objectives and values of the project sponsor, client, and other stakeholders.” Learning happens during the dialog process as each stakeholder comes to observe other stakeholder’s values and ideas about what successful development would encompass.

The Fifth Element, by Peter Senge, emphasizes the importance of learning to improve lives using systems thinking. Individuals who acquire information, knowledge, and skills from other stakeholders and the environment tend to experience a change in their own lives and livelihood. They themselves then become the agents of change by sharing their knowledge with others.

=== Complex loop ===
A feedback loop, closed loop, or systems complex model is a tool to help cope with complexity and understand the system as a whole. The tool will help to visualize the direction, velocity, delay time, long term and short term effects, and to help see the dynamic process. Feedback is necessary to learn about each other, including objectives and values of stakeholders and officials. A systemic approach to development is change oriented. The approach must encourage humans to communicate through interpersonal interactions, address the values of each stakeholder, and take part in developing and understanding the complex loop.

== Goals ==
Parts, society, needs, means, individuals, and bigger picture are pieces of the puzzle that must be accounted for to make systemic development successful.

Systemic development is based on the principle that one must understand the complexity of the whole system to develop a solution. This can be accomplished by learning different elements in the system and applying them to their existing knowledge. We must learn about the past suggested solutions, the balance of the system, influx of the system, the challenges within the system, the best timing for each element, learning about uncertainty of cause-and-effect, the best leverage points in the system, the system does not work unless every piece is functioning at its prime, and there is no one individual at fault if everyone is working together.

The goal of systemic development is to have community participants shift from being reactors to viewing themselves “as active participants in shaping their reality [to move] from reacting to the present to creating the future”

The non-linear processes must coincide, be fluid and strive to benefit all parties involved.

== See also ==
- Soft systems methodology
- Systems philosophy
- Sustainable Development
- Community Development
- Social Systems Theory
- Developmental Systems Theory
- Economic Development
- Ecology Systems Theory
