= Schaumburg-Lippe Landtag elections in the Weimar Republic =

German state elections

Landtag elections in the Free State of Schaumburg-Lippe (Freistaat Schaumburg-Lippe) during the Weimar Republic were held at 3-year intervals between 1919 and 1931. Results with regard to the total vote, the percentage of the vote won and the number of seats allocated to each party are presented in the tables below. On 31 March 1933, the sitting Landtag was dissolved by the Nazi-controlled central government and reconstituted to reflect the distribution of seats in the national Reichstag. The Landtag subsequently was formally abolished as a result of the "Law on the Reconstruction of the Reich" of 30 January 1934 which replaced the German federal system with a unitary state.

== 1919 ==
The 1919 Schaumburg-Lippe state election was held on 16 February 1919 to elect the 15 members of the Landtag.

1919 Schaumburg-Lippe Landtag election
Party	Votes	%	Seats
Social Democratic Party of Germany	12,217	54.08	8
German Democratic Party	3,574	15.82	2
German National People's Party	2,487	11.01	2
Non-party	2,058	9.11	2
German People's Party	1,341	5.94	1
Citizens Association	812	3.59	0
Others	101	0.45	0
Total	22,590	100.00	15
Valid votes	22,590	99.87	
Invalid/blank votes	29	0.13	
Total votes	22,619	100.00	
Registered voters/turnout	26,418	85.62	
Source: Elections in the Weimar Republic, Elections in Germany

== 1922 ==
The 1922 Schaumburg-Lippe state election was held on 23 April 1922 to elect the 15 members of the Landtag.

1922 Schaumburg-Lippe Landtag election
Party	Votes	%	Seats	+/–
Social Democratic Party of Germany	10,583	43.91	7	–1
German People's Party	3,527	14.63	2	+1
Agricultural League	1,902	7.89	1	New
Craftsmen Federation	1,768	7.34	1	New
Independent Social Democratic Party of Germany	1,590	6.60	1	New
German National People's Party – (Country List)	1,585	6.58	1	New
German Democratic Party	1,184	4.91	1	–1
German National People's Party – (Citizens List)	872	3.62	1	New
Nonpartisan Progressive Group	536	2.22	0	New
Economic Association	398	1.65	0	New
Others	156	0.65	0	New
Total	24,101	100.00	15	0
Valid votes	24,101	99.76		
Invalid/blank votes	58	0.24		
Total votes	24,159	100.00		
Registered voters/turnout	29,318	82.40		
Source: Elections in the Weimar Republic, Elections in Germany

== 1925 ==
The 1925 Schaumburg-Lippe state election was held on 3 May 1925 to elect the 15 members of the Landtag.

1925 Schaumburg-Lippe Landtag election
Party	Votes	%	Seats	+/–
Social Democratic Party of Germany	12,058	45.43	7	0
Unified List (DNVP, DVP & LB)	9,125	34.38	6	New
Schaumburg-Lippe Craftsmen Federation	2,230	8.40	1	0
German Democratic Party	1,919	7.23	1	0
Nonpartisan Christian List	657	2.48	0	New
Communist Party of Germany	554	2.09	0	New
Total	26,543	100.00	15	0
Valid votes	26,543	99.68		
Invalid/blank votes	84	0.32		
Total votes	26,627	100.00		
Registered voters/turnout	30,855	86.30		
Source: Elections in the Weimar Republic, Elections in Germany

== 1928 ==
The 1928 Schaumburg-Lippe state election was held on 29 April 1928 to elect the 15 members of the Landtag.

1928 Schaumburg-Lippe Landtag election
Party	Votes	%	Seats	+/–
Social Democratic Party of Germany	12,266	49.20	8	+1
German National People's Party and Rural League	4,141	16.61	3	New
German People's Party	2,134	8.56	1	New
German Democratic Party	1,971	7.91	1	0
Schaumburg-Lippe Craftsmen Federation	1,799	7.22	1	0
National Block	1,690	6.78	1	New
Communist Party of Germany	928	3.72	0	0
Total	24,929	100.00	15	0
Valid votes	24,929	99.20		
Invalid/blank votes	202	0.80		
Total votes	25,131	100.00		
Registered voters/turnout	32,195	78.06		
Source: Elections in the Weimar Republic, Elections in Germany

== 1931 ==
The 1931 Schaumburg-Lippe state election was held on 3 May 1931 to elect the 15 members of the Landtag.

1931 Schaumburg-Lippe Landtag election
Party	Votes	%	Seats	+/–
Social Democratic Party of Germany	12,999	44.59	7	–1
Nazi Party	7,854	26.94	4	New
German National People's Party	2,954	10.13	1	New
Communist Party of Germany	1,864	6.39	1	+1
German People's Party	1,608	5.52	1	0
German State Party	1,493	5.12	1	New
German Farmers (Christian-National Peasants' and Farmers' Party)	379	1.30	0	New
Total	29,151	100.00	15	0
Valid votes	29,151	98.86		
Invalid/blank votes	336	1.14		
Total votes	29,487	100.00		
Registered voters/turnout	33,861	87.08		
Source: Elections in the Weimar Republic, Elections in Germany
