= Brunswick Landtag elections in the Weimar Republic =

German state elections

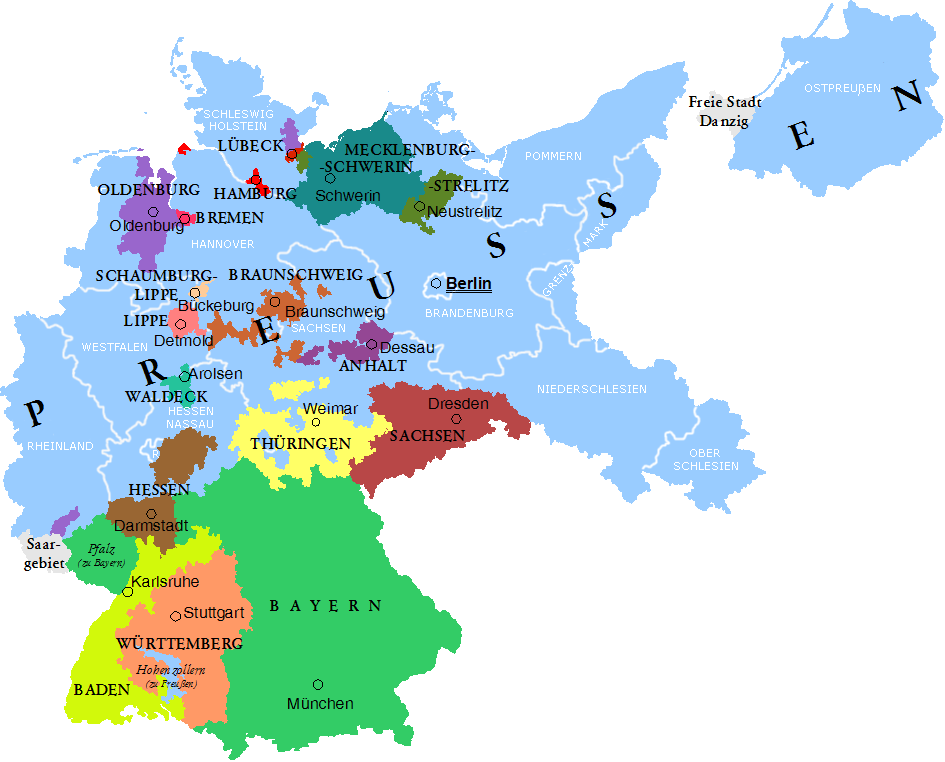
States of the Weimar Republic – Brunswick in light brown at centre

Landtag elections in the Free State of Brunswick (Freistaat Braunschweig) during the Weimar Republic were held at two-year, later three-year, intervals between 1918 and 1930. Results with regard to the total vote, the percentage of the vote won and the number of seats allocated to each party are presented in the tables below. On 31 March 1933, the sitting Landtag was dissolved by the Nazi-controlled central government and reconstituted to reflect the distribution of seats in the national Reichstag. The Landtag subsequently was formally abolished as a result of the "Law on the Reconstruction of the Reich" of 30 January 1934 which replaced the German federal system with a unitary state.

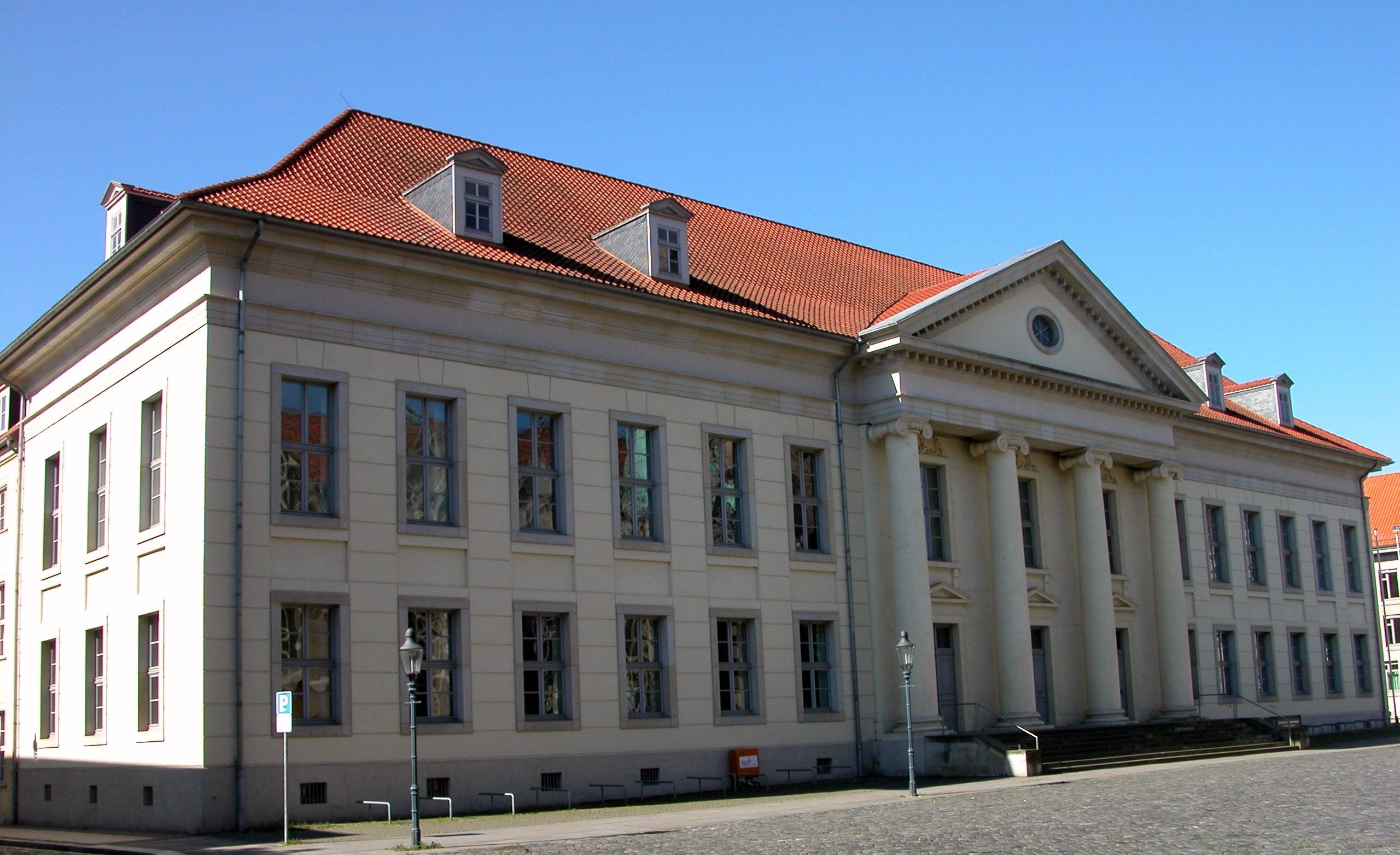
Brunswick Landtag building in Braunschweig

== 1918 ==
The 1918 Brunswick state election was held on 22 December 1918 to elect the 60 members of the Landtag.

1918 Brunswick Landtag election
Party	Votes	%	Seats
Social Democratic Party of Germany	58,759	27.67	17
Brunswick State Electoral Association	55,621	26.19	16
Independent Social Democratic Party of Germany	51,672	24.33	14
German Democratic Party	46,293	21.80	13
Total	212,345	100.00	60
Valid votes	212,345	99.92	
Invalid/blank votes	177	0.08	
Total votes	212,522	100.00	
Registered voters/turnout	283,501	74.96	
Source: Elections in the Weimar Republic, Elections in Germany

== 1920 ==
The 1920 Brunswick state election was held on 16 May 1920 to elect the 60 members of the Landtag.

1920 Brunswick Landtag election
Party	Votes	%	Seats	+/–
Brunswick State Electoral Association	86,161	37.32	23	+7
Independent Social Democratic Party of Germany	86,123	37.31	23	+9
Social Democratic Party of Germany	34,237	14.83	9	–8
German Democratic Party	21,899	9.49	5	–8
Communist Party of Germany	2,423	1.05	0	New
Total	230,843	100.00	60	0
Valid votes	230,843	99.85		
Invalid/blank votes	344	0.15		
Total votes	231,187	100.00		
Registered voters/turnout	301,941	76.57		
Source: Elections in the Weimar Republic, Elections in Germany

== 1922 ==
The 1922 Brunswick state election was held on 22 January 1922 to elect the 60 members of the Landtag.

1922 Brunswick Landtag election
Party	Votes	%	Seats	+/–
Brunswick State Electoral Association	101,004	37.97	23	0
Independent Social Democratic Party of Germany	73,404	27.59	17	–6
Social Democratic Party of Germany	52,640	19.79	12	+3
German Democratic Party	28,446	10.69	6	+1
Communist Party of Germany	10,518	3.95	2	+2
Total	266,012	100.00	60	0
Valid votes	266,012	99.52		
Invalid/blank votes	1,296	0.48		
Total votes	267,308	100.00		
Registered voters/turnout	309,552	86.35		
Source: Elections in the Weimar Republic, Elections in Germany

== 1924 ==
The 1924 Brunswick state election was held on 7 December 1924 to elect the 48 members of the Landtag.

1924 Brunswick Landtag election
Party	Votes	%	Seats	+/–
Social Democratic Party of Germany	101,004	32.50	19	+7
German National People's Party	73,404	23.62	10	New
German People's Party	52,640	16.94	9	New
Economic Unity List	28,446	9.15	4	New
German Democratic Party	10,518	3.38	2	–4
Communist Party of Germany	12,806	4.12	2	0
National Socialist Freedom Movement	12,328	3.97	1	New
Brunswick-Lower Saxony Party (German-Hanoverian Party)	10,358	3.33	1	New
Centre Party	4,690	1.51	0	New
Independent Social Democratic Party of Germany	4,609	1.48	0	–17
Total	310,803	100.00	48	–12
Valid votes	310,803	98.43		
Invalid/blank votes	4,962	1.57		
Total votes	315,765	100.00		
Registered voters/turnout	328,230	96.20		
Source: Elections in the Weimar Republic, Elections in Germany

== 1927 ==
The 1927 Brunswick state election was held on 27 November 1927 to elect the 48 members of the Landtag.

1927 Brunswick Landtag election
Party	Votes	%	Seats	+/–
Social Democratic Party of Germany	128,317	46.20	24	+5
German People's Party	39,646	14.27	8	−1
German National People's Party	26,217	9.44	5	−5
Reich Party of the German Middle Class	22,605	8.14	4	New
Communist Party of Germany	12,954	4.66	2	0
Democrats and Farmers' Union (German Democratic Party)	12,806	4.61	2	New
House and Land Owners	12,328	4.44	2	New
Nazi Party	10,358	3.73	1	New
People's Rights Party (Reich Party for Civil Rights and Deflation)	4,690	1.69	0	New
Centre Party	4,609	1.66	0	0
Brunswick-Lower Saxony Party (German-Hanoverian Party)	3,237	1.17	0	−1
Total	277,767	100.00	48	0
Valid votes	277,767	99.51		
Invalid/blank votes	1,375	0.49		
Total votes	279,142	100.00		
Registered voters/turnout	336,058	83.06		
Source: Elections in the Weimar Republic, Elections in Germany

== 1930 ==
The 1930 Brunswick state election was held on 14 September 1930 to elect the 40 members of the Landtag.

1930 Brunswick Landtag election
Party	Votes	%	Seats	+/–
Social Democratic Party of Germany	125,625	40.99	17	−7
Civil Unity List (DNVP–DVP–Z–WP)	79,684	26.00	11	New
Nazi Party	67,902	22.16	9	+8
Communist Party of Germany	20,964	6.84	2	0
German State Party	9,226	3.01	1	New
People's Rights Party (VRP–CSVD)	2,323	0.76	0	New
Reich Party (National Center)	727	0.24	0	New
Total	306,451	100.00	40	−8
Valid votes	306,451	98.77		
Invalid/blank votes	3,815	1.23		
Total votes	310,266	100.00		
Registered voters/turnout	347,581	89.26		
Source: Elections in the Weimar Republic, Elections in Germany
