= Fort Ney (Fransecky) =

Fort in Alsace, France

Coordinates: 48.6373°N 7.80106°E

Fort Ney and previously known as Fort Fransecky is situated in Alsace and lies about 5 kilometres (3 mi) north of Strasbourg in the forest of Robertsau next to the river Ill. It formed part of a belt of fortifications that protect Strasbourg.

Fort Fransecky was built between 1873 and 1876 and continuously upgraded from 1880 to 1914 and its guns commanded the river and other nearby transport routes including the railway from Strasbourg to the frontier town of Lauterbourg. The fort was renamed Fort Ney in 1918.

During the German occupation of France during World War II Fort Ney was a centre for study of gases like phosgene. In an attempt to find an antidote to the gas, 52 concentration camp prisoners were exposed to the gas and then treated. After exposure, many of them suffered from pulmonary edema and four of them died.

In 1944 the local German high command used the fort as their headquarters during the Allied campaign to liberate Strasbourg. Strasbourg was liberated by a French armoured division on 23 November 1944, and the fort's German garrison of about four hundred held for a further two days before surrendering on 25 November.

Today the fort in use by the French military and is not open to the public.

== See also ==
- Fortified Sector of the Lower Rhine (Secteur Fortifié du Bas-Rhin) was the French military organization that in 1940 controlled the section of the French frontier with Germany in the vicinity of Strasbourg.
