= Republic of Baden =

German state (1918–1945)

Republic of Baden Republik Baden
- State of the Weimar Republic and Nazi Germany
- 1918–1945
- Flag Coat of arms

- The Republic of Baden (red) within the Weimar Republic

Anthem
- Badnerlied
- Capital: Karlsruhe
- Area
  - Coordinates: 48°18′N 7°46′E
  - 1925: 15,070 km^{2} (5,820 sq mi)
- Population
  - 1925: 2,312,462
- Government
  - Type: Republic
- President
  - 1918–1920 (first): Anton Geiß
  - 1933–1945 (last): Walter Köhler (Minister-President)
- Reichsstatthalter
  - 1933–1945: Robert Wagner
- Legislature: Landtag
- Historical era: Interwar · World War II
  - Established: 14 November 1918
  - Constitution enacted: 13 April 1919
  - Abolition (de facto): 11 March 1933
  - Abolition (de jure): 19 September 1945
Preceded by	Succeeded by
Grand Duchy of Baden	Württemberg-Baden; South Baden
- Today part of: Germany

The Republic of Baden (German: Republik Baden) was a German state during the Weimar Republic. It was formed as the successor to the Grand Duchy of Baden during the German revolution of 1918–1919 and formally dissolved in 1945. Today it is part of the state of Baden-Württemberg.

Workers' and soldiers' councils peacefully replaced the government of the Grand Duchy in November 1918. The people of Baden elected an assembly in January 1919 that passed a constitution giving Baden a single-chamber parliament that elected the president and government ministers from among its ranks. Until the end of the Weimar Republic, Baden was governed by coalitions of the Catholic Centre Party and other parties of the moderate left and right.

Much of the Republic of Baden was part of the post-World War I demilitarized zone along the Rhine, and small areas were occupied by the French for varying lengths of time until 1930. Baden saw two leftist uprisings in its early years, but overall it experienced relatively little political violence during the Weimar period.

The Republic of Baden ceased de facto to exist in March 1933 following the Nazi takeover, although it was not formally abolished until September 1945 under the post-World War II Allied Occupation in Germany. After a number of reorganizations of territory in southwest Germany, it became part of Baden-Württemberg in 1952.

== History ==
=== World War I ===
By mid-1917, war weariness, problems with the food supply, and the state's intervention in economic and social structures (such as through the Hindenburg Program) were beginning to erode many Badeners trust in the government at both the state and national levels. In response, Baden's branch of the moderate Majority Social Democratic Party (MSPD) began to urge reform of the Duchy's Landtag (parliament). Its aims included the introduction of proportional representation and ministerial responsibility to the Landtag rather than the grand duke. There were also protests by workers who wanted economic improvements and more participation in the political process. Their efforts made little progress because many members of the Landtag thought that their liberal 1818 constitution already came closer than any other in Germany to the ideal of a parliamentary monarchy. It was not until 3 November 1918, when the German revolution of 1918–1919 was already sweeping across northern Germany, that legislators began to move seriously towards reform as a means of forestalling an upheaval in Baden, but by then too little time remained for them to complete their work.

The Armistice of 11 November 1918 put almost all of Baden in the demilitarized zone along the Rhine, where the presence of active military personnel and an armed police force were prohibited. It left Baden with few security resources at a time when it was being flooded by returning soldiers and refugees from neighboring Alsace–Lorraine, which had been returned to France. Many Badeners feared French retaliation or occupation.

=== German revolution ===
The revolution spread across Germany through the establishment of workers' and soldiers' councils. They took power from the existing military, royal and civil authorities with little resistance or bloodshed. The revolution reached Berlin on 9 November, and Emperor Wilhelm II fled to Holland the next day.

The first councils in Baden were formed on 8 November in the garrison towns of Lahr and Offenburg. On the 10th, the MSPD, Progressive People's Party, Centre Party and National Liberal Party set up a Welfare Committee (Wohlfahrtsausschuss) in Karlsruhe to work with the local soldiers' and workers' council in an attempt to keep the revolution within democratic bounds. The soldiers' and workers' council took over military authority, while the Welfare Committee, following the resignation of the grand duke's ministers, acted as a provisional people's government under the leadership of Anton Geiss of the MSPD. Five ministerial posts were occupied by members of the MSPD, two by the more radical Independent Social Democratic Party (USPD) and the remainder by the other three parties on the Committee.

Frederick II, the last grand duke of Baden

Grand Duke Frederick II and his family fled Karlsruhe for Zwingenberg Castle in northern Baden on the night of 11 November 1918. The unusual circumstances leading to their departure are sometimes referred to facetiously as the 'Klumpp putsch'. Heinrich Klumpp, a sailor from Karlsruhe who had possible psychological problems and had spent a year in prison for embezzlement before being drafted to serve in World War I, attempted to enter the Karlsruhe Palace with a group of soldiers in order to talk to the Grand Duke. When they were refused entry, they fired their weapons at the front of the palace. The Grand Duke and his family, in apparent fear of revolutionary violence, left through the back where an automobile was waiting. (Klumpp was arrested the next day but released under an amnesty in December, before his trial took place.) On 13 November at Langenstein Castle in far southern Baden, Frederick relinquished his governing authority and instructed Baden's officials to serve the provisional government. On 22 November he officially renounced the throne for himself and his cousin Prince Maximilian of Baden, who had been the German Empire's last chancellor (3 October to 9 November 1918) and would have succeeded Frederick. The ducal family was granted generous compensation in the form of a one-time payment and life-long appanage.

Also on 22 November, the workers' and soldiers' councils in Mannheim proclaimed themselves to be a provisional parliament, which left Baden with a double governing structure. To end the political split, the Welfare Committee in Karlsruhe announced plans for an election to a national assembly that would decide Baden's future form of government. The election on 12 January 1919 was universal, equal, secret, direct and open to all men and women over 20 years of age. The winners were the centrist parties that also made up the Weimar Coalition in Berlin: the Centre Party with 39 seats, the MSPD with 36 and the German Democratic Party (DDP) with 25. The USPD, the main supporter of the workers' and soldiers' councils, received only 15,500 votes, or 1.5% of the total. Its poor showing meant the practical end of the council movement in Baden, although it was not until 18 August that the councils formally disbanded.

Historian Valentin J. Hemberger saw the MSPD as playing a key role the peacefulness of the revolution in Baden:

The fact that the revolution in the southwest was largely peaceful was also due to the historically moderate attitude of the Social Democrats, who had worked closely with the liberals in Baden since 1905 and made up a significant proportion of the members of local councils in 1918. Radical forces such as the Independent Social Democratic Party (USPD) found it difficult to make their opinions heard.

When the Baden National Assembly met on 15 January 1919, it confirmed the provisional government and established a constitutional committee to evaluate and revise as they saw fit three drafts of a republican constitution which had been drawn up beforehand. The committee's proposal was debated and amended in the National Assembly in March and passed by a unanimous vote on the twenty-first. The constitution included the requirement that it be approved by a popular referendum before it could formally come into effect. The vote on 13 April was favorable by a large majority, although only 35% of the population participated. The referendum was the first in German history, and the Baden constitution was the only one passed by popular vote in Germany during the Weimar period. The new Constitution of the Republic of Baden, which was officially enacted on 25 April 1919, established a single chamber Landtag that passed legislation, appointed ministers, elected the state president and could dismiss ministers by a majority vote. The ministry, under the leadership of the annually elected president, executed the laws and could enact emergency legislation when it deemed it necessary.

=== Leftist uprisings ===
==== 1919 communist insurrection ====
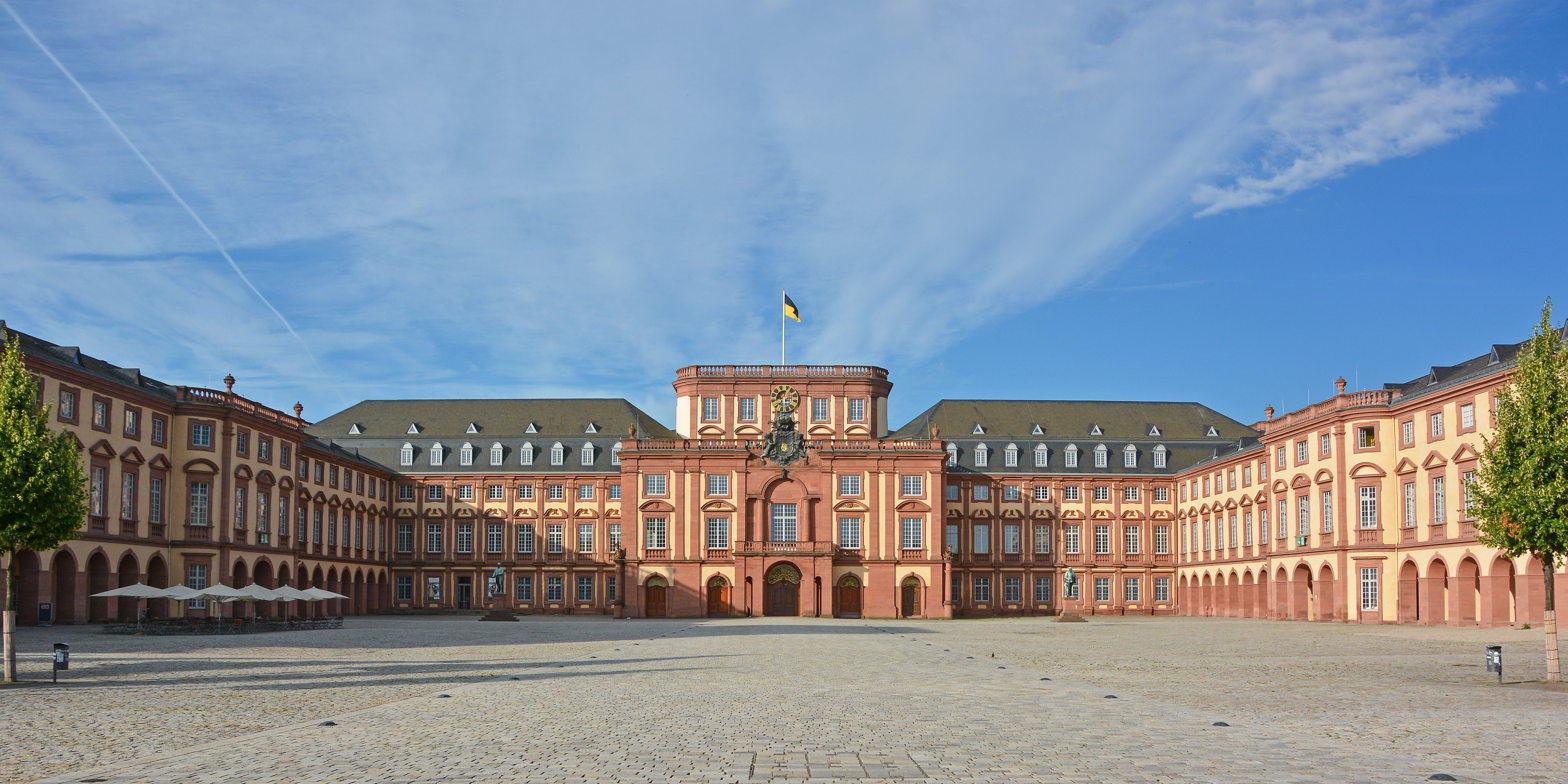
The Mannheim Palace, parts of which were ransacked during the 1919 insurrection

Kurt Eisner, the USPD minister-president of the People's State of Bavaria, was assassinated in Munich on 21 February 1919. The USPD and Communist Party of Germany (KPD) held a demonstration mourning Eisner in Mannheim on 22 February. Attendance was estimated at between 10,000 and 40,000 people. Albert Stolzenburg, a KPD official, proclaimed a soviet republic without consulting the other organizers of the event. Spurred by calls to take action to establish the republic, about one thousand of the demonstrators went to Mannheim Palace, where some judicial officials had offices. The group stormed the palace, ransacked the government wing, burned documents and freed prisoners. Rioting broke out in the rest of the city. The 110th Infantry Regiment, believing that the MSPD was involved in the demonstration, willingly disarmed itself.

Police began combatting rioters on 23 February. The Revolutionary Workers' Council was formed in Mannheim on the same day. French soldiers blocked bridges along the Rhine in response to the uprising. The government of Baden declared a state of emergency and banned all gatherings, demonstrations, distribution of pamphlets and the public carrying of weapons. A curfew of 7 p.m. was instituted, and rail connections to the city were stopped. Also on 23 February, a meeting between the MSPD, USPD, and KPD reached an agreement in which the soviet republic was dissolved. The state of emergency was lifted, except in Mannheim, the next day.

On 5 March, the government announced that the 110th Infantry Regiment would be withdrawn from Mannheim and replaced by a different battalion to support the police. The KPD called for a general strike to oppose the decision. The 2nd Volunteer Battalion was moved from Bruchsal to Mannheim on 7 March and aided the police in arresting leaders of the uprising and prisoners freed from the Mannheim Palace. The state of emergency in Mannheim was lifted on the tenth.

==== 1923 Upper Baden strikes ====
During the period of hyperinflation in 1923, serious unrest broke out in Lörrach, a city of about 20,000 with a substantial textile industry in far southwest Baden. Workers called a general strike on 14 September demanding pay raises in line with the extremely high rate of inflation. Part of a crowd estimated at 15,000 released five prisoners from the Lörrach prison and forced a number of business owners from their homes to bargain over their demands. The owners granted most of what the workers' wanted but then rescinded their offers the following Monday, September 17th, because they had been under duress. The Baden government sent in extra police from Freiburg, and one demonstrator was killed in a clash. The general strike was called again, and the KPD and its sympathizers organized armed groups, resulting in more fighting and deaths. A state of emergency was called on the 18th. Despite the violence, negotiations resumed, with results similar to the coerced bargaining of the 14th. The strike ended on the 24th, and the state of emergency was called off the following day. The men who were put on trial for their actions during the unrest were given relatively moderate sentences.

=== French occupation ===
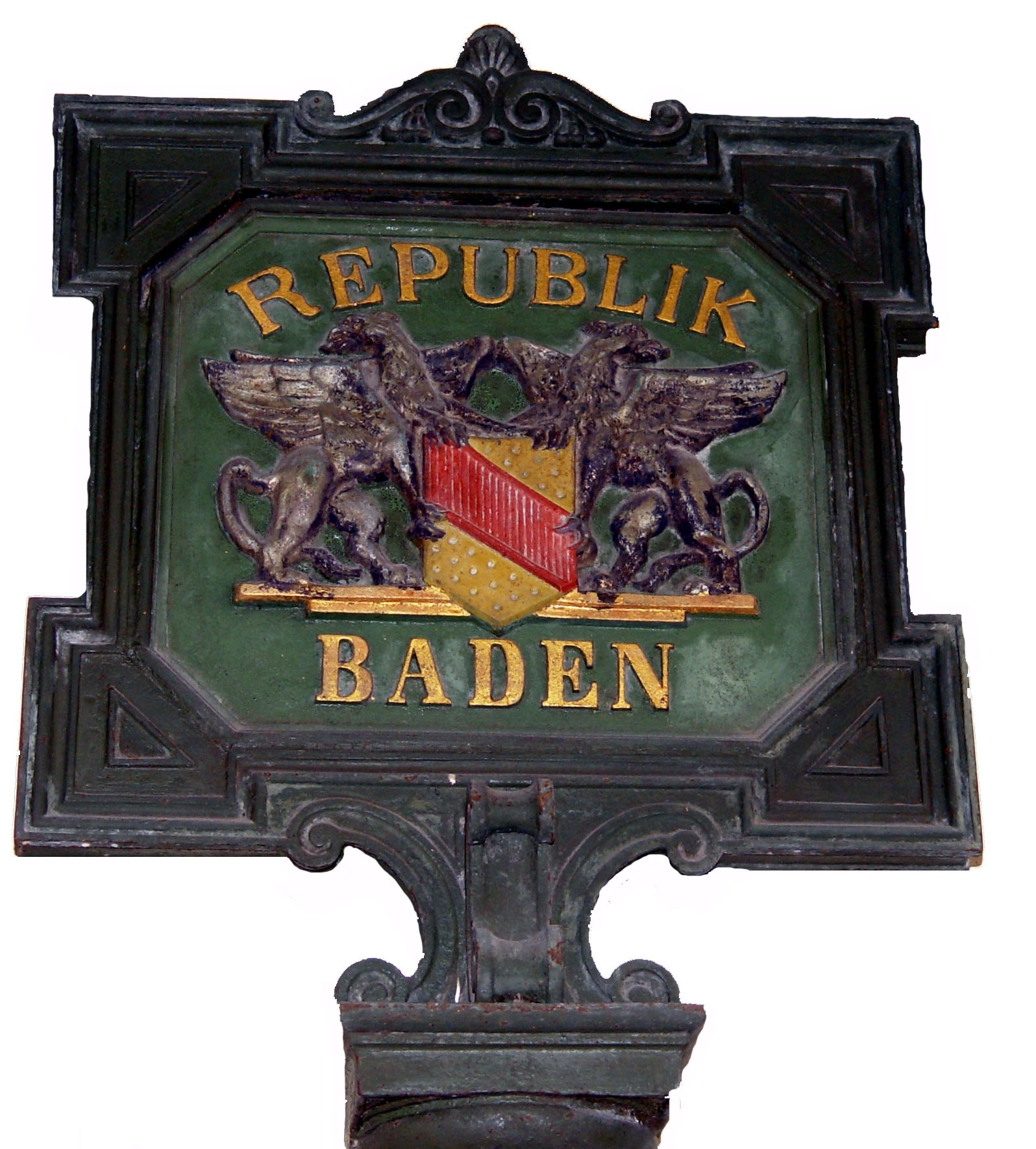
Republic of Baden sign in the Rastatt city museum

Small parts of Baden were occupied by French troops for varying lengths of time during the Weimar Republic. On 29 January 1919, under the provisions of Article 65 of the Treaty of Versailles, French troops occupied the town of Kehl (population around 10,000 in 1925). It is situated on the Rhine opposite Strasbourg, which as part of Alsace–Lorraine had become French territory at the end of World War I. Kehl stayed under French occupation until 1930. The French extended the area occupied to include Offenburg and Appenweier (both to the west of Kehl) on 4 February 1923. France's grounds were that Germany had violated Article 367 of the Treaty of Versailles requiring Germany to facilitate the passage of foreign trains through its territory; Germany asserted that the problems were due to a lack of coal. The French action significantly disrupted north–south rail traffic through Baden until the French withdrew on 18 August 1924. On 3 March 1923, as part of the occupation of the Ruhr, the port facilities at both Karlsruhe and Mannheim came under the control of the French Army. It caused a steep drop in port traffic and lasted for eighteen months.

=== Landtag elections ===
The first regular election to the Landtag of Baden, held on 30 October 1921, saw the percentage of votes won by the three coalition parties of the National Assembly drop by almost a quarter, although together they still commanded over two-thirds of the seats in the new Landtag. The DDP was down by 14 percentage points, the SPD by 10 and the Centre up by 1; the largest gainers were the Agricultural League (Landbund) with 8%, the German People's Party (DVP) with 6%, and the KPD, up 4%. In the new government, the DDP filled the annual president's post twice and the SPD and Centre once each.

Little changed following the 1925 and 1929 elections. Both governments consisted initially of the Centre and SPD, with the DDP contributing one member in 1926 and the DVP one in 1931. Seven of the eight state presidents during the two periods were from the Centre Party. The Nazi Party entered the Landtag for the first time in 1929 with six seats and 7% of the vote. The 1929 election was the last during the Weimar Republic.

=== Nazi rule ===
In the 5 March 1933 election to the German Reichstag, held a little over a month after Adolf Hitler became the German chancellor, 45% of voters in Baden chose the Nazi Party, 25% the Centre, 13% the SPD and 10% the KPD. The "Provisional Law on the Coordination of the States with the Reich" of 31 March 1933 – part of the Nazi process of Gleichschaltung (coordination) – then dissolved the Landtag of Baden and all other German states not already in Nazi control and ordered the state parliaments reconstituted based on the votes each state had cast in the 5 March election. Seats won by the KPD were not filled. In Baden, the re-forming of the Landtag put 30 of 63 seats into the hands of the Nazis.

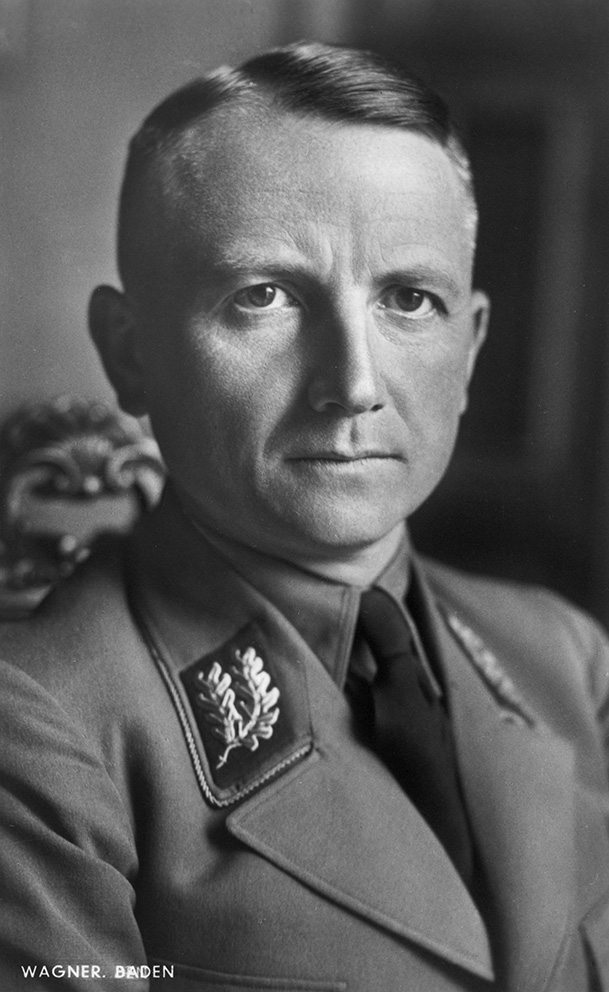
Robert Wagner, Nazi Reich commissioner and governor of Baden

On 8 March 1933, Robert Heinrich Wagner was sent to Baden as Reichskommissar and took over the duties of the Ministry of the Interior, which included the police force. The government of Baden under President Josef Schmitt (Centre Party) attempted to block Wagner from imposing his own ministry by forming a coalition government with the Nazis, who lacked an absolute majority in the Landtag. Herbert Kraft, a Nazi Party Landtag deputy, told Schmitt that Wagner had agreed to the coalition, and the Centre-led ministry resigned on 10 March with the understanding that it would continue governing in a caretaker capacity until the Landtag was called into session and chose a new government. Wagner forestalled the move by naming himself president of Baden the following day and forming a Nazi-only ministry. Subsequent to the enactment of the "Provisional Law and Second Law on the Coordination of the States with the Reich" on 7 April, Wagner was appointed to the new position of Reichsstatthalter (Reich governor). He then installed Walter Köhler as minister-president, although executive power in the region actually rested with Wagner, who was also the Nazi Party Gauleiter of Baden. On 30 January 1934, the Reich government enacted the "Law on the Reconstruction of the Reich", which formally abolished all the states' parliaments and transferred sovereignty to the central government. In March 1941, Gau Baden was expanded to include the occupied French district of Alsace and renamed "Gau Baden-Alsace".

=== Post-war ===
During the Allied occupation of post-war Germany, Baden was divided between the American and French occupation zones. The division was made so that the Autobahn connecting Karlsruhe and Munich (today the A8) was completely contained within the American zone. The northern American-administered area became part of the state of Württemberg-Baden on 19 September 1945, while the southern half was placed under French administration and became the state of South Baden or simply "Baden". At that point, the Republic of Baden was dissolved. Both of the new entities became constituent states of West Germany at its founding on 23 May 1949. They later were reunited and merged with the state of Württemberg on 25 April 1952 to form the new state of Baden-Württemberg.

== Administration ==
The Republic of Baden was subdivided into four administrative districts (Landeskommissärbezirke, similar to the modern Regierungsbezirke) based in Karlsruhe, Mannheim, Freiburg and Konstanz. The four districts were further divided into a total of 53 Amtsbezirke (in 1924 the number was reduced to 40). The Amtsbezirke, roughly equivalent to American and British counties, were divided into a total of 1,536 municipalities.

== Leaders ==
Following the constitution, passed in 1921, the President of Baden was an elected from the standing members of the Baden Landtag for a 1-year term. After Gleichschaltung, Baden was governed by appointed Nazi officials.
