= Central European History =

Academic journal

- Discipline: History
- Language: English
- Edited by: Kenneth Ledford; Catherine Epstein

Publication details
- History: 1968–present
- Publisher: Cambridge University Press for the Central European History Society (United States)
- Frequency: Quarterly

Standard abbreviations
- ISO 4: Cent. Eur. Hist.

Indexing
- ISSN: 0008-9389 (print); 1569-1616 (web)
- LCCN: 2002-227108
- JSTOR: centeurohist
- OCLC no.: 47795498

Links
- Journal homepage

Central European History is a quarterly peer-reviewed academic journal on history published by Cambridge University Press on behalf of the Central European History Society, an affiliate of the American Historical Association. It covers all aspects of Central European history from the Middle Ages to the present day. It was established in 1968 and is edited by Kenneth Ledford and Catherine Epstein.

The journal was published by Brill Publishers in the past.
