= Landtag of the Republic of Baden =

The Landtag of the Republic of Baden was the representative legislative body for the Republic of Baden from 1919 to 1934 during the time of the Weimar Republic. It succeeded the second chamber of the Badische Ständeversammlung (Chamber of Estates) of the Grand Duchy of Baden. Through most of the Weimar period, the Landtag was dominated by parties of the Weimar Coalition, with the Catholic Centre Party as the largest party.

After the Nazis came to power at the national level, they instituted the Gleichschaltung (coordination) process by enacting the "Provisional Law on the Coordination of the States with the Reich" on 30 March 1933. This dissolved all the sitting Landtage and reconstituted them on the basis of the recent 5 March 1933 Reichstag election results, which had given the Nazi Party and its coalition partner the DNVP a working majority. In Baden, this resulted in the Weimar Coalition parties being reduced from 58 seats to 25, while the Nazis and their partner increased their representation from 9 to 32. During its last session (6 March to 14 October 1933) the Landtag only held three sittings between 16 May and 9 June 1933 and passed no significant legislation. On 14 October the Landtag was dissolved along with those of all the German states and no new elections were scheduled. On 30 January 1934, the Reich government enacted the "Law on the Reconstruction of the Reich", formally abolishing all the Landtage and transferring the sovereignty of the states to the central government.

== Presidents ==
Period	Name and Party
5 January 1919 – 7 October 1921	Ferdinand Kopf, Zentrum
9. November 1921 – 4 May 1923	Franz Josef Wittemann, Zentrum
4 May 1923 – 20 March 1930	Eugen Baumgartner, Zentrum
20 March 1930 – 4 March 1933	Josef Duffner, Zentrum
16. Mai 1933 – 30. Januar 1934	Herbert Kraft, NSDAP

== Bibliography ==
- Michael Braun: Der Badische Landtag 1918–1933. Handbuch der Geschichte des deutschen Parlamentarismus. Droste Verlag, Düsseldorf 2010, ISBN 978-3-7700-5294-3.
- Martin Furtwängler (Bearbeitg.): Die Protokolle der Regierung der Republik Baden. Erster Band: die provisorische Regierung November 1918 – März 1919. W. Kohlhammer, Stuttgart 2012, ISBN 978-3-17-022055-3.
