= 1970 in architecture =

The year 1970 in architecture involved some significant architectural events and new buildings.

== Events ==
- September 23–29 – Adam Fergusson's essay criticising inappropriate development in the historic English city of Bath, Somerset, "The Sack of Bath", is published in The Times newspaper by the editor William Rees-Mogg, a landmark in concern for architectural conservation in Britain.

== Buildings and structures ==
=== Buildings opened ===
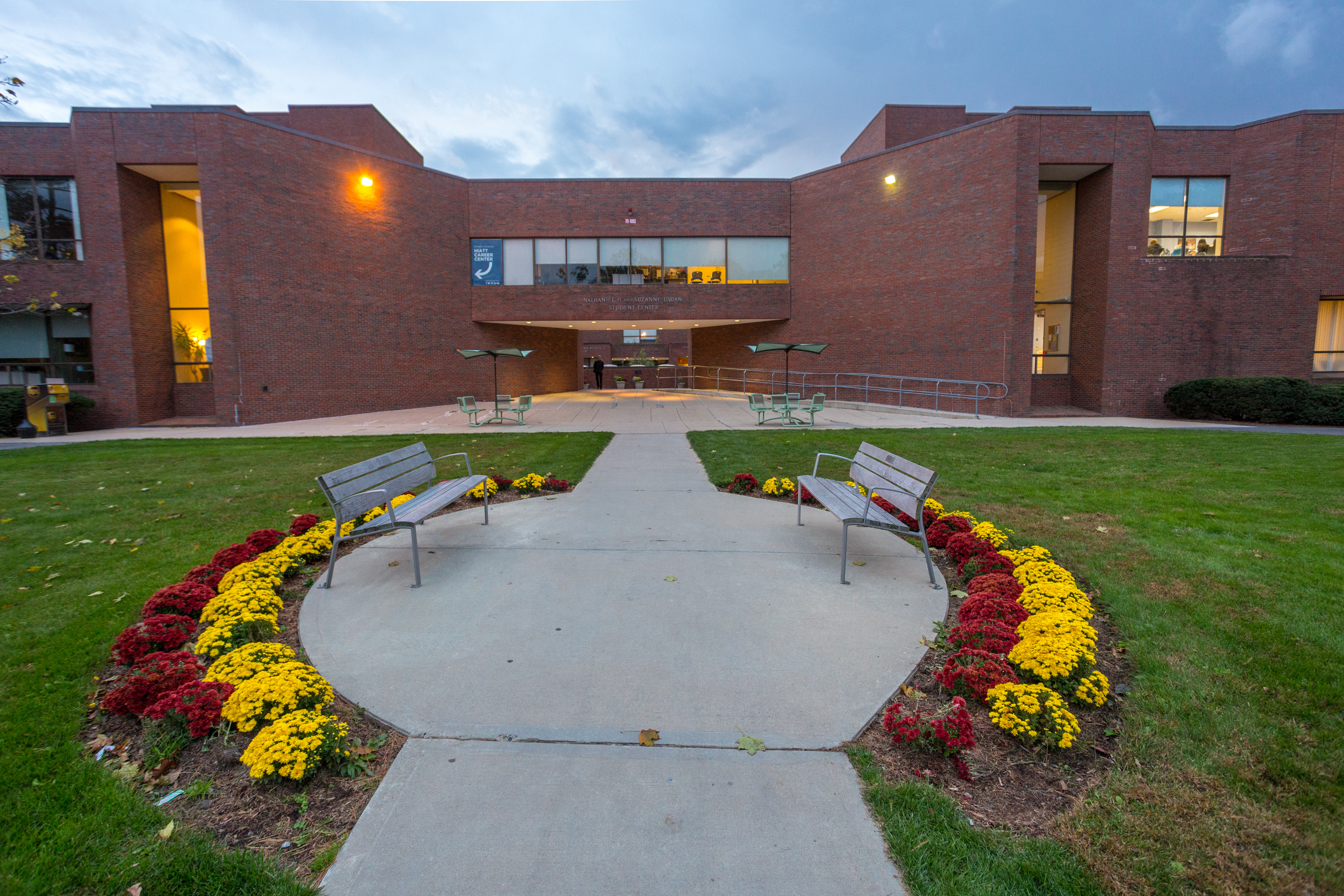
Usdan Center

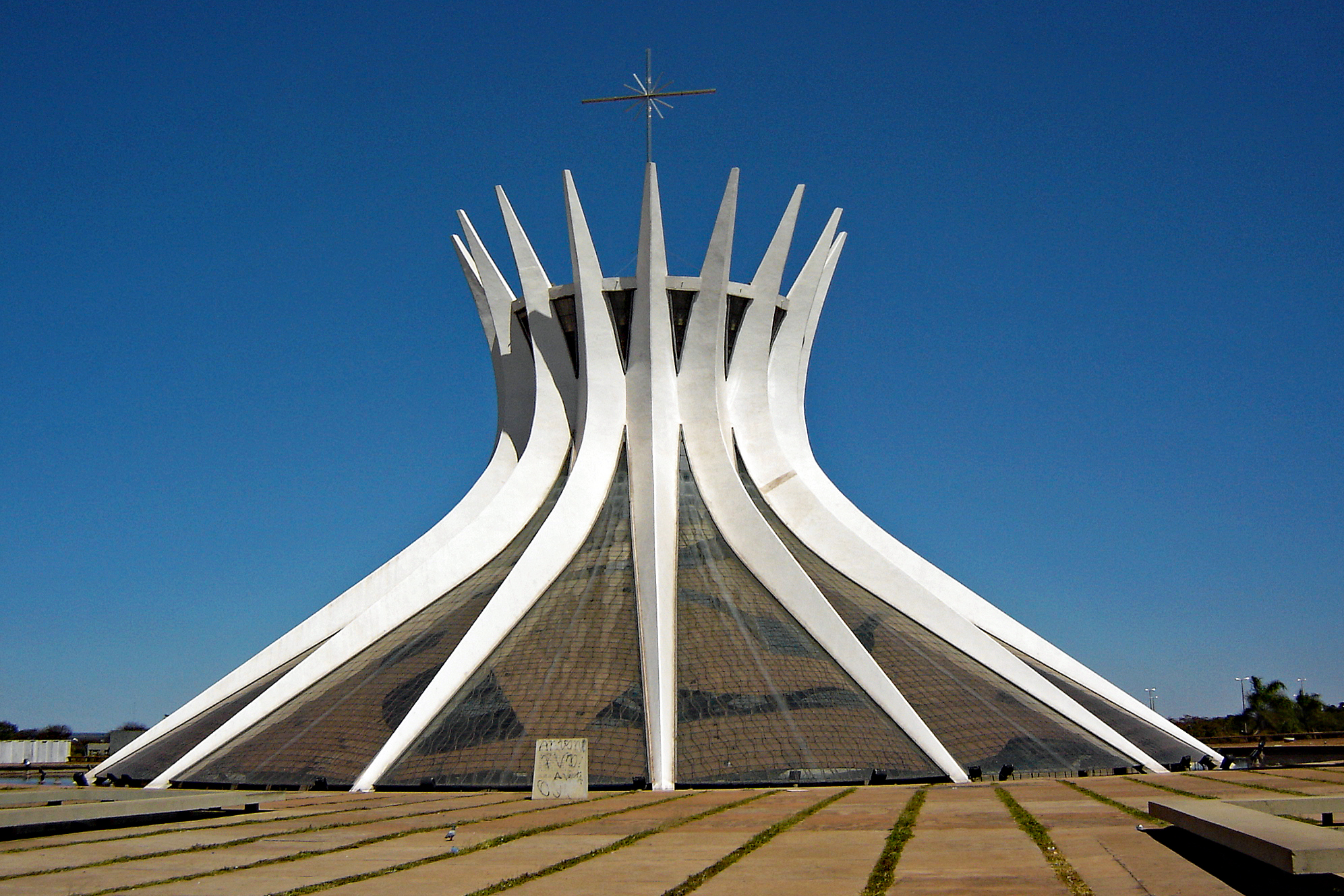
Cathedral of Brasília, Brazil

- March 7 – John Hancock Center official opening ceremony, by Bruce Graham/ SOM, in Chicago, Illinois.
- May 31 – Cathedral of Brasília, designed by Oscar Niemeyer, is dedicated.
- July 21 – The Aswan High Dam in Egypt (officially opened in January 1971).
- August – Dai Heiwa Kinen Tō, cenotaph in Osaka, Japan.
- November 1 — Usdan Student Center, Brandeis University, designed by Hugh Stubbins and Associates.
- December 23 – The North Tower of the World Trade Center in New York City, by Minoru Yamasaki, is topped out at 1,368 feet, making it the tallest building in the world. The building accepts its first tenants that same month.

=== Buildings completed ===
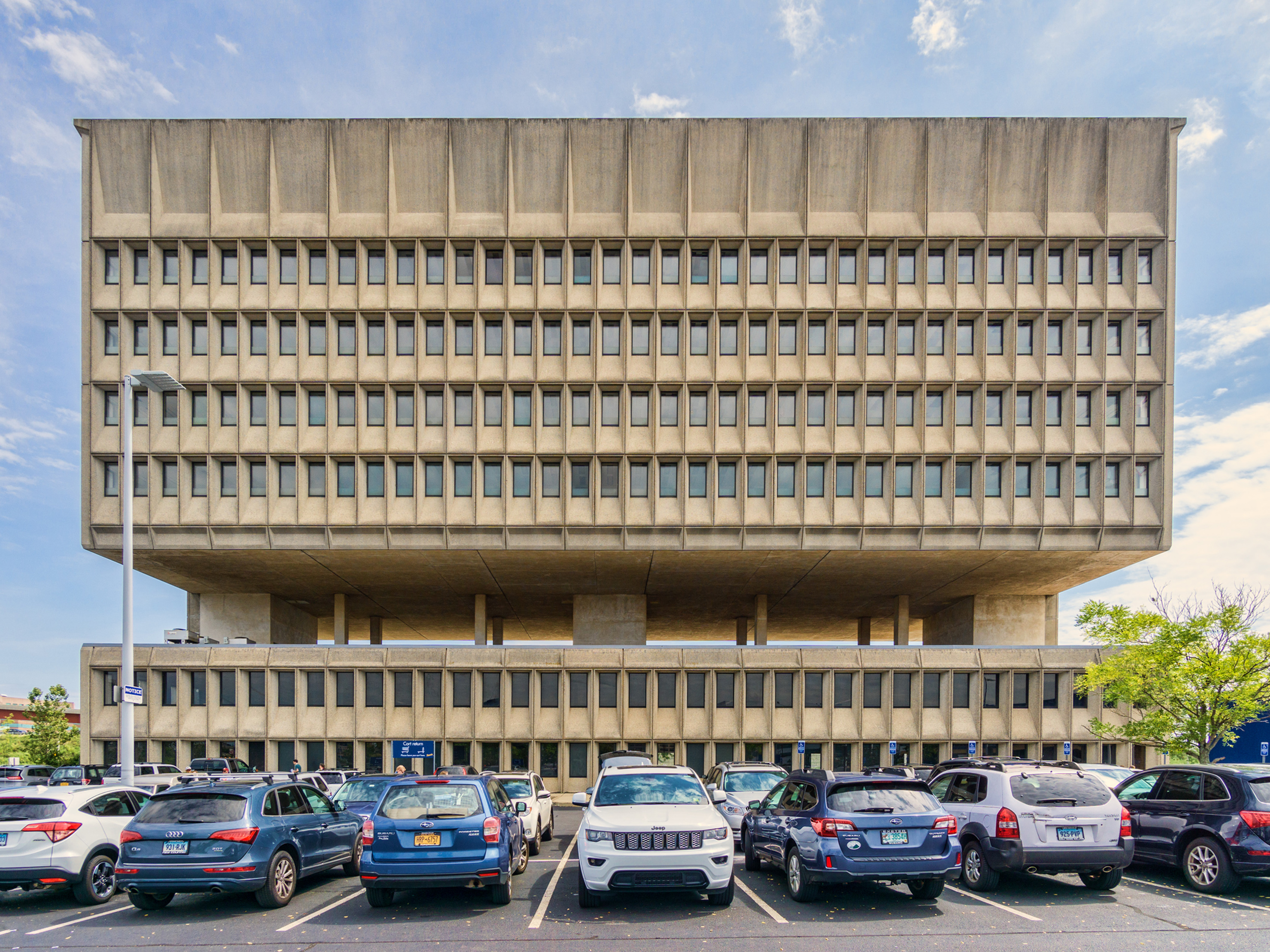
Armstrong Rubber Company Headquarters

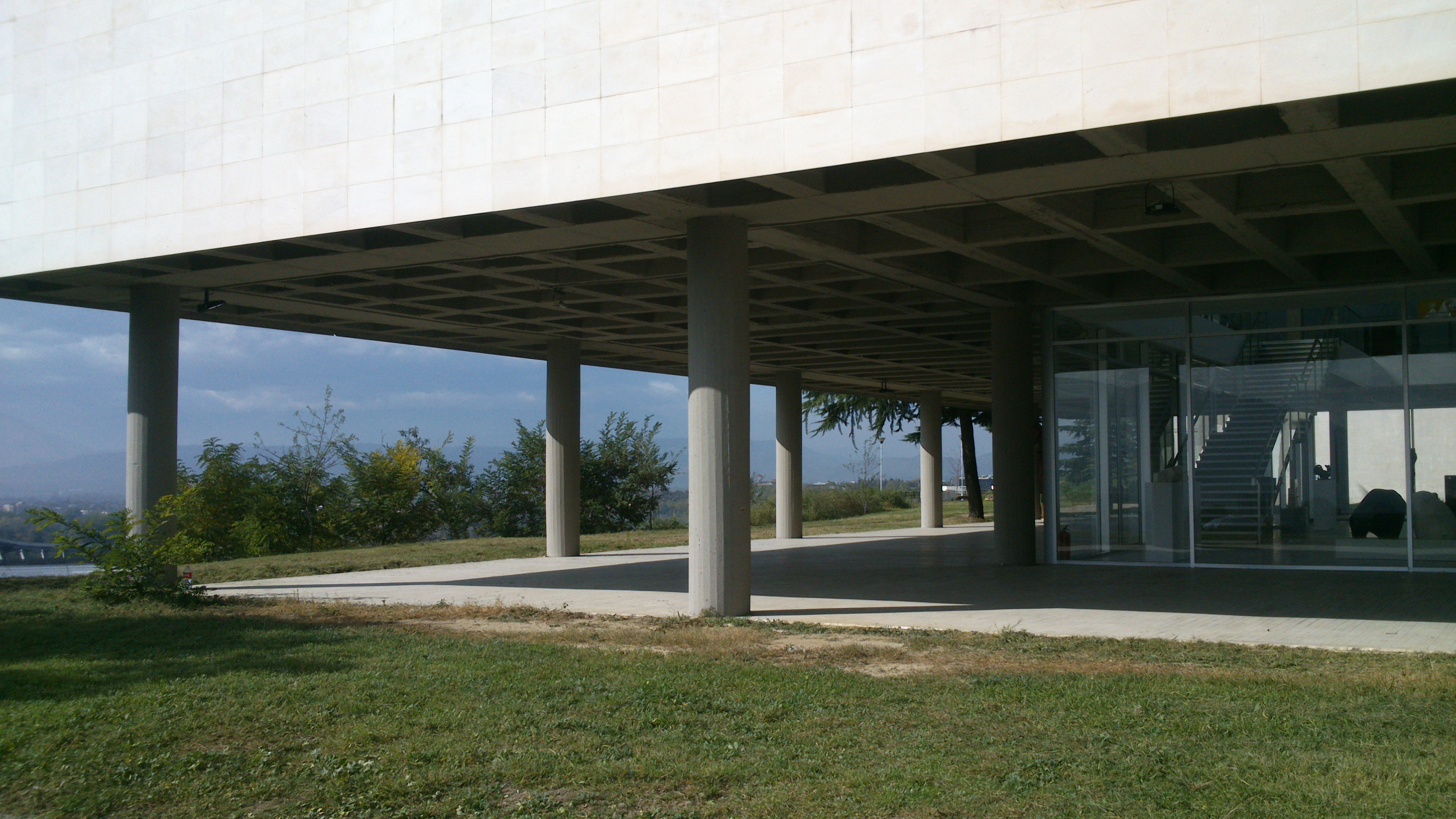
Contemporary Art Museum in Skopje, North Macedonia

- Armstrong Rubber Company Headquarters, later known as the Pirelli Tire Building, a brutalist landmark in New Haven, Connecticut designed by Marcel Breuer.
- CBR Building in Brussels, Belgium by Constantin Brodzki and Marcel Lambrichs.
- 11 Stanwix Street (Westinghouse Tower) in Pittsburgh, Pennsylvania.
- East Harlem Pre-School in New York City, by Hammel, Green and Abrahamson.
- Pimlico Secondary School in London, England, by John Bancroft of the Greater London Council architecture department (demolished 2010).
- Euston Tower in London, England.
- One Palliser Square in Calgary, Alberta
- KEMO Toren telecommunications tower in Arnhem, Netherlands.
- Mount Angel Abbey Library in St. Benedict, near Mount Angel, Oregon, by Alvar Aalto.
- Central Library, University of California, San Diego, by William Pereira.
- Contemporary Art Museum in Skopje, by the "Warsaw Tigers" (Wacław Kłyszewski, Jerzy Mokrzyński and Eugeniusz Wierzbicki).
- Kettle's Yard art gallery extension in Cambridge, England, by Leslie Martin.
- Oklahoma Theater Center in Oklahoma City, by John M. Johansen.
- Phillips Exeter Athletics at Exeter, New Hampshire, by Kallmann McKinnell & Wood.
- Trust Bank Building in Johannesburg, South Africa.
- The Royal Commonwealth Pool in Edinburgh, Scotland, by RMJM.
- The Apollo Pavilion in Peterlee, England, by Victor Pasmore.
- World Trade Center (Tokyo), Japan's tallest building at this time.
- Yerevan Chess House, Armenia.
- Queensgate Market, Huddersfield, England, by J. Seymour Harris Partnership (Gwyn Roberts, project architect).
- Równica Sanatorium, Ustroń-Zawodzie, Poland.
- Capel Manor House, Horsmonden, Kent, England, by Michael Manser.
- The Cornell Campus Store, an underground shopping arcade at Cornell University, by Earl Flansburgh

=== Buildings started ===
- House of Soviets (Kaliningrad), designed by Yulian L. Shvartsbreim; never completed as a functional building.

== Awards ==
- AIA Gold Medal – Richard Buckminster Fuller
- Architecture Firm Award – Ernest J. Kump Associates
- RAIA Gold Medal – Jack McConnell
- RIBA Royal Gold Medal – Robert Matthew

== Births ==
- April 4 – Tom Wiscombe, American architect
- July 4 – Tatiana Fabeck, Luxembourg architect

== Deaths ==
- April 16 – Richard Neutra, Austrian-American architect working in Southern California (born 1892)
- May 9 – Oscar Stonorov, German-born modernist architect and architectural writer, historian and archivist (born 1905)
- May 24 – J. George Stewart, US architect and politician (born 1890)
- July 3 – Joseph Charles Fowell, Australian architect (born 1891)
- July 11 – André Lurçat, French modernist architect, landscape architect, furniture designer and city planner (born 1894)
- July 20 – Egon Eiermann, German architect (born 1904)
- September 11 – Ernst May, German architect and city planner (born 1886)
- December 29 – Rose Connor, American architect (born 1892)
