= Gresham's law =

Monetary principle

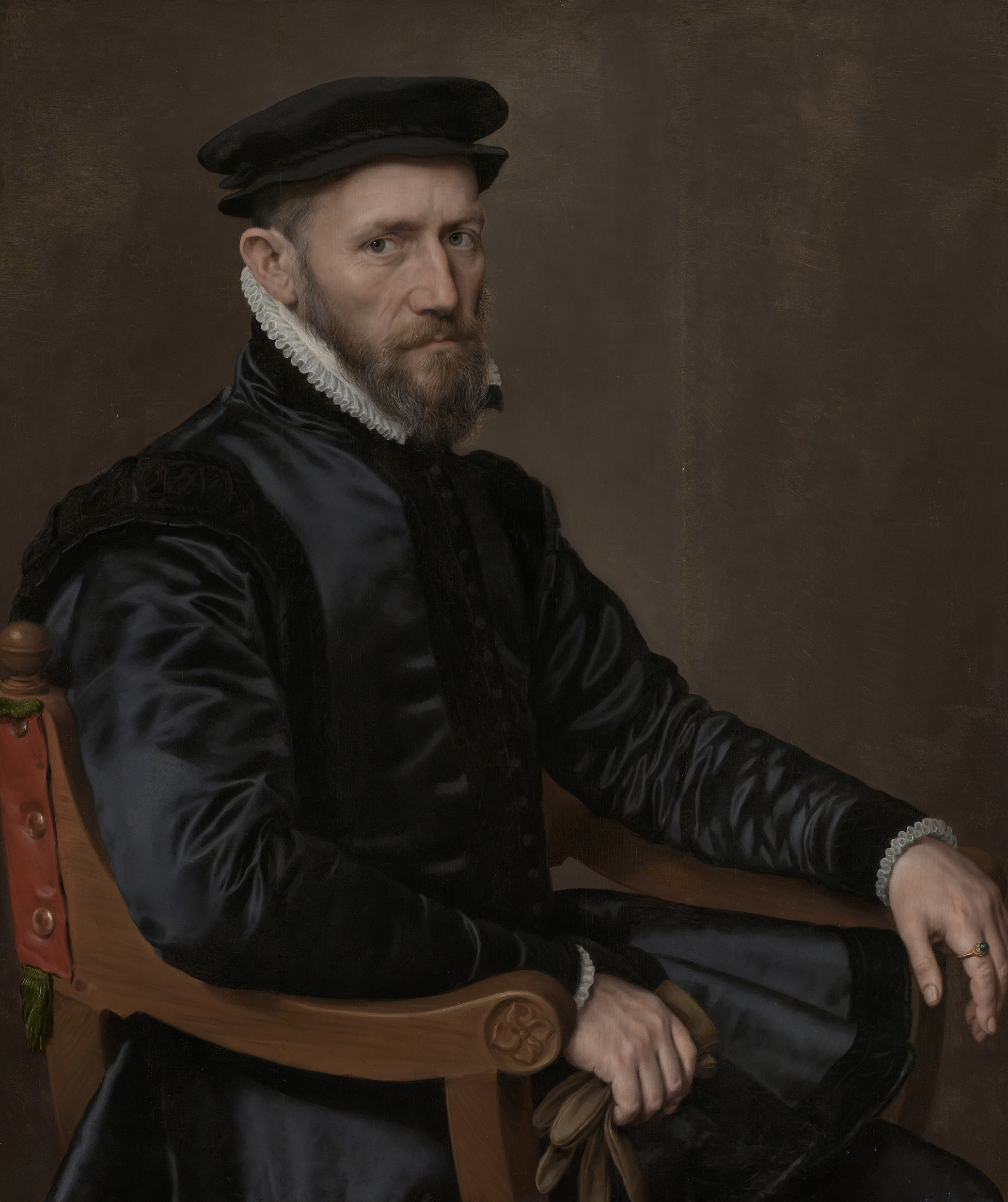
Sir Thomas Gresham

In economics, Gresham's law, also Gresham-Copernicus Law (after Nicolaus Copernicus) is a monetary principle stating that "bad money drives out good". For example, if there are two coins in circulation containing metal of different value, which are accepted by law as having similar face value, the more valuable coin based on the inherent value of its component metals will gradually disappear from circulation.

The law was named in 1857 by economist Henry Dunning Macleod after Sir Thomas Gresham, an English financier during the Tudor dynasty. Gresham had urged Queen Elizabeth to restore confidence in the debased English currency. The concept was thoroughly defined in Renaissance Europe by Prussian polymath Nicolaus Copernicus and known centuries earlier in classical Antiquity, the Near East and China.

== "Good money" and "bad money" ==
Under Gresham's law, "good money" is money that shows little difference between its nominal value (the face value of the coin) and its melt value (the intrinsic value of the metal item based solely on the market value of the metal of which it is made, often precious metals, such as gold or silver).

The price spread between face value and commodity value when it is minted is called seigniorage. As some coins do not circulate, remaining in the possession of coin collectors, this can increase demand for coins.

On the other hand, "bad money" is money that has a commodity value considerably lower than its face value and is in circulation along with good money, where both forms are required to be accepted at equal value as legal tender.

In Gresham's day, bad money included any coin that had been debased. Debasement was often done by the issuing body, where less than the officially specified amount of precious metal was contained in an issue of coinage, usually by alloying it with a base metal. The public could also debase coins, usually by clipping or scraping off small portions of the precious metal, also known as "stemming" (reeded edges on coins were intended to make clipping evident). Other examples of bad money include counterfeit coins made from base metal. Today, virtually all circulating coins are made from base metals, often the cheapest available, durable base metal; collectively these monies are known as fiat money. While virtually all contemporary coinage is composed solely of base metals, there have been periods during the twenty-first century in which the market values of some base metals, such as copper, have been high enough that at least one common coin (the U.S. nickel) still maintained "good money" status.

In the case of clipped, scraped, or counterfeit coins, the commodity value was reduced by fraud. The face value remains at the previous higher level. On the other hand, with a coinage debased by a government issuer, the commodity value of the coinage was often reduced quite openly, while the face value of the debased coins was held at the higher level by legal tender laws.

The old saying, "a bad penny always turns up" is a colloquial recognition of Gresham's law.

== Theory ==
The law states that any circulating currency consisting of both "good" and "bad" money (both forms required to be accepted at equal value under legal tender law) quickly becomes dominated by the "bad" money. This is because people spending money will hand over the "bad" coins rather than the "good" ones, keeping the "good" ones. Legal tender laws act as a form of price control. In such a case, the intrinsically less valuable money is preferred in exchange, because people prefer to save the intrinsically more valuable money.

Imagine that a customer with several silver sixpence coins purchases an item that costs five pence. Some of the customer's coins are more debased, while others are less so – but legally, they are all mandated to be of equal value. The customer would prefer to retain the better coins, and so offers the shopkeeper the most debased one. In turn, the shopkeeper must give one penny in change, and has every reason to give the most debased penny. Thus, the coins that circulate in the transaction will tend to be of the most debased sort available to the parties.

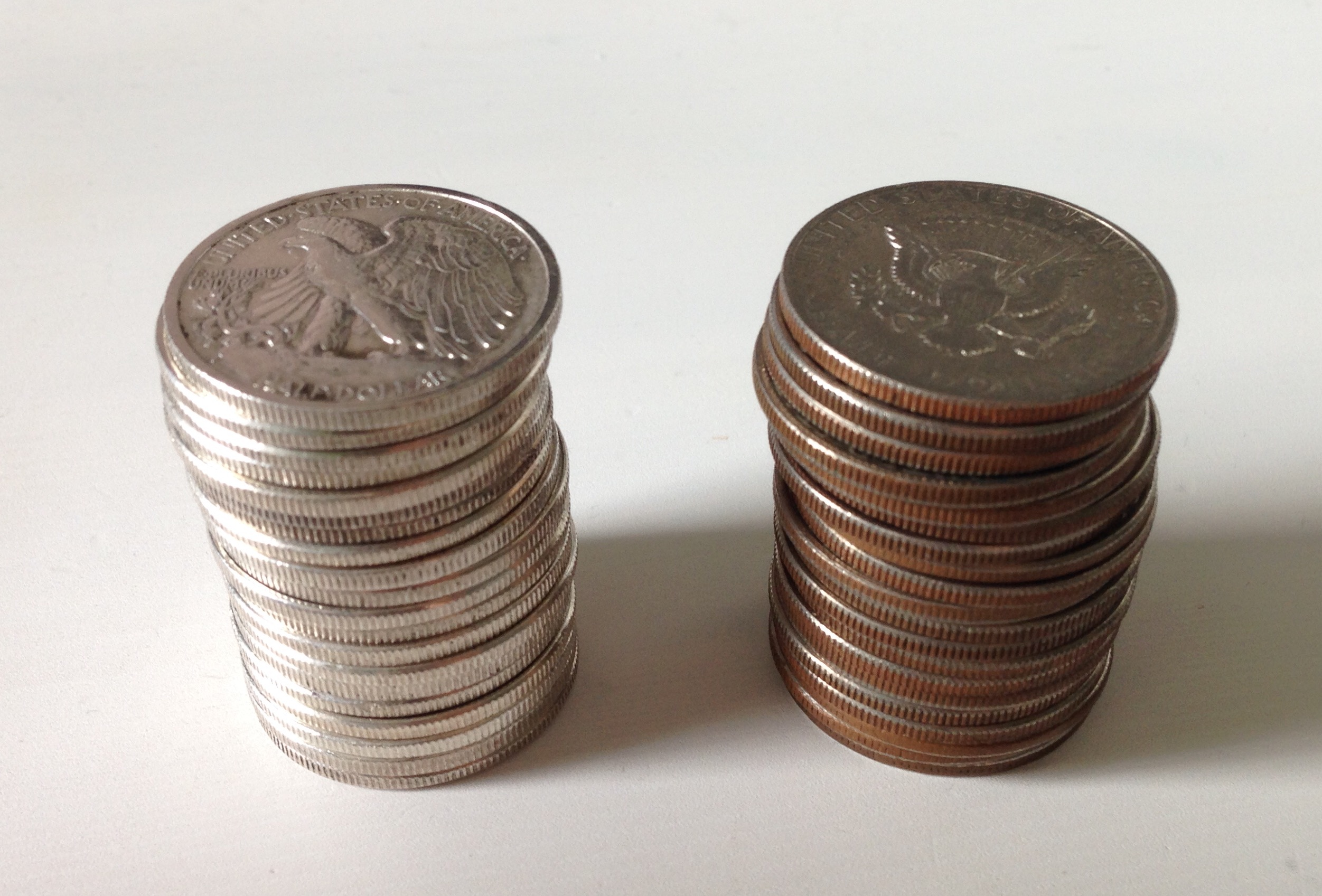
A stack of twenty Walking Liberty half dollars (left), which contain 90% silver. In an example of Gresham's law, these coins were quickly hoarded by the public after the Coinage Act of 1965 debased half dollars to contain only 40% silver, and then were debased entirely in 1971 to base cupronickel (right).

If "good" coins have a face value below that of their metallic content, individuals may be motivated to melt them down and sell the metal for its higher intrinsic value, even if such destruction is illegal. The 1965 United States half-dollar coins contained 40% silver; in previous years these coins were 90% silver (.900 or, one nine fine). With the release of the 1965 half-dollar, which was legally required to be accepted at the same value as the earlier 90% halves, the older 90% silver coinage quickly disappeared from circulation, while the newer debased coins remained in use. As the value of the dollar (Federal Reserve notes) continued to decline, resulting in the value of the silver content exceeding the face value of the coins, many of the older half dollars were melted down or removed from circulation and into private collections and hoards. Beginning in 1971, the U.S. government abandoned including any silver in half dollars. The metal value of the 40% silver coins began to exceed their face value, which resulted in a repeat of the previous event. The 40% silver coins also began to vanish from circulation and into coin hoards.

A similar situation occurred in 2007 in the United States with the rising price of copper, zinc, and nickel, which led the U.S. government to ban the melting or mass exportation of one-cent and five-cent coins.

In addition to being melted down for its bullion value, money that is considered to be "good" tends to leave an economy through international trade. International traders are not bound by legal tender laws as citizens of the issuing country are, so they will offer higher value for good coins than bad ones. The good coins may leave their country of origin to become part of international trade, escaping that country's legal tender laws and leaving the "bad" money behind. This occurred in Britain during the period of adoption of the gold standard: In 1717, then-Master of the Mint Isaac Newton declared the gold guinea to be worth 21 silver shillings. This overvalued the gold guinea in Britain, making it "bad", and encouraged people to send "good" silver shillings abroad, where it could buy more gold than at home. This gold was then minted as currency, which bought silver shillings, which were sent abroad for gold, and so on. For a century, hardly any silver coins were minted in Britain, and Britain had moved onto a de facto gold standard.

== History of the concept ==
Gresham was not the first to state the law that took his name. The phenomenon had been noted by Aristophanes in his play The Frogs, usually dated at 405 BC:

It has often struck our notice that the course our city runs
Is the same towards men and money. She has true and worthy sons:
She has good and ancient silver, she has good and recent gold.
These are coins untouched with alloys; everywhere their fame is told;
Not all Hellas holds their equal, not all Barbary far and near.
Gold or silver, each well minted, tested each and ringing clear.
Yet, we never use them! Others always pass from hand to hand.
Sorry brass just struck last week and branded with a wretched brand.
So with men we know for upright, blameless lives and noble names.
Trained in music and palaestra, freemen's choirs and freemen's games,
These we spurn for men of brass...

According to Ben Tamari, the currency devaluation phenomenon was already recognized in ancient sources. In China, Yuan dynasty economic authors Yeh Shih and Yuan Hsieh were aware of the same phenomenon.

Ibn Taimiyyah described the phenomenon as follows:

If the ruler cancels the use of a certain coin and mints another kind of money for the people, he will spoil the riches (amwal) which they possess, by decreasing their value as the old coins will now become merely a commodity. He will do injustice to them by depriving them of the higher values originally owned by them. Moreover, if the intrinsic values of coins are different it will become a source of profit for the wicked to collect the small (bad) coins and exchange them (for good money) and then they will take them to another country and shift the small (bad) money of that country (to this country). So (the value of) people's goods will be damaged.

Notably this passage mentions only the flight of good money abroad and says nothing of its disappearance due to hoarding or melting. Palestinian economist Adel Zagha also attributes a similar concept to medieval Islamic thinker Al-Maqrizi, who offered, claims Zagha, a close approximation to what would become known as Gresham's law centuries later.

In the fourteenth century it was noted by Nicole Oresme c. 1350, in his treatise On the Origin, Nature, Law, and Alterations of Money, and by jurist and historian Al-Maqrizi in the Mamluk Empire.

Johannes de Strigys, an agent of Ludovico III Gonzaga, Marquis of Mantua in Venice, wrote in a 1472 report che la cativa cazarà via la bona ("that the bad money will chase out the good").

In the year that Gresham was born, 1519, it was described by Nicolaus Copernicus in a earlier treatise called Tractatus de Monetis Nicolai Copernici: "bad (debased) coinage drives good (un-debased) coinage out of circulation". Copernicus was aware of the practice of exchanging bad coins for good ones and melting down the latter or sending them abroad, and he seems to have drawn up some notes on this subject while he was at Olsztyn in 1519. He made them the basis of a report that he presented to the Prussian Diet held in 1522, attending the session with his friend Tiedemann Giese to represent his chapter. Copernicus's Monetae cudendae ratio was an enlarged, Latin version of that report, setting forth a general theory of money for the 1528 diet. He also formulated a version of the quantity theory of money. For this reason, it is occasionally known as the Gresham–Copernicus law.

Sir Thomas Gresham, a sixteenth-century financial agent of the English Crown in the city of Antwerp, was one in a long series of proponents of the law, which he did to explain to Queen Elizabeth I what was happening to the English shilling. Her father, Henry VIII, had replaced 40% of the silver in the coin with base metals, to increase the government's income without raising taxes. Astute English merchants and ordinary subjects saved the good shillings from pure silver and circulated the bad ones. Hence, the bad money would be used whenever possible, and the good coinage would be saved and disappear from circulation.

According to the economist George Selgin:

As for Gresham himself, he observed "that good and bad coin cannot circulate together" in a letter written to Queen Elizabeth on the occasion of her accession in 1558. The statement was part of Gresham's explanation for the "unexampled state of badness" that England's coinage had been left in following the "Great Debasements" of Henry VIII and Edward VI, which reduced the metallic value of English silver coins to a small fraction of what it had been at the time of Henry VII. Owing to these debasements, Gresham observed to the Queen, that "all your fine gold was convayed out of this your realm".

Gresham made his observations of good and bad money while in the service of Queen Elizabeth, with respect only to the observed poor quality of British coinage. Earlier monarchs, Henry VIII and Edward VI, had forced the people to accept debased coinage by means of legal tender laws. Gresham also made his comparison of good and bad money where the precious metal in the money was the same metal, but of different weight. He did not compare silver to gold, or gold to paper.

In his "Gresham's Law" article, Selgin also offers the following comments regarding the origin of the name:

The expression "Gresham's Law" dates back only to 1858, when British economist Henry Dunning Macleod (1858, pp. 476–8) decided to name the tendency for bad money to drive good money out of circulation after Sir Thomas Gresham (1519–1579). However, references to such a tendency, sometimes accompanied by discussion of conditions promoting it, occur in various medieval writings, most notably Nicholas Oresme's (c. 1357) Treatise on money. The concept can be traced to ancient works, including Aristophanes' The Frogs, where the prevalence of bad politicians is attributed to forces similar to those favoring bad money over good.

== Reverse of Gresham's law (Thiers' law) ==
The reverse of Gresham's law, that good money drives out bad money whenever the bad money becomes nearly worthless, has been named "Thiers' law" by economist Peter Bernholz in honor of French politician and historian Adolphe Thiers. "Thiers' Law will only operate later [in the inflation] when the increase of the new flexible exchange rate and of the rate of inflation lower the real demand for the inflating money." Nobel Prize winner Robert Mundell believes that Gresham's law could be more accurately rendered, taking care of the reverse, if it were expressed as: "Bad money drives out good if they exchange for the same price."

Austrian economist Hans-Hermann Hoppe said that "so-called Gresham's law" only applies under certain conditions, largely a result of governmental interventionist policies. In his 2021 book, Economy, Society, and History Hoppe states:

You might have heard about the so-called Gresham's law, which states that bad money drives out good money, but this law only holds if there are price controls in effect, only if the exchange ratios of different monies are fixed and no longer reflect market forces. Is it the case that bad money drives out good money under normal circumstances without any interference? No, for money holds to exactly the same law that holds for every other good. Good goods drive out bad goods. Good money drives out bad money, so this bezant was for something like 800 years considered to be the best money available and was preferred by merchants from India to Rome to the Baltic Sea.

The experiences of dollarization in countries with weak economies and currencies (such as Israel in the 1980s, Eastern Europe and countries in the period immediately after the collapse of the Soviet bloc, or Ecuador throughout the late twentieth and early twenty-first century) may be seen as Gresham's law operating in its reverse form (Guidotti & Rodriguez, 1992) because in general, the dollar has not been legal tender in such situations, and in some cases, its use has been illegal.

Adam Fergusson (in: When Money Dies) and Costantino Bresciani-Turroni (in Le vicende del marco tedesco, published in 1931) pointed out that, during the great inflation in the Weimar Republic in 1923, as the official money became so worthless that virtually nobody would take it, people simply stopped accepting the currency in exchange for goods. That was particularly serious because farmers began to hoard food. Accordingly, any currency backed by any sort of value became a circulating medium of exchange. In 2009, hyperinflation in Zimbabwe began to show similar characteristics.

Those examples show that in the absence of effective legal tender laws, Gresham's law works in reverse. If given the choice of what money to accept, people will accept the money they believe to be of highest long-term value and not accept what they believe to be of low long-term value. If not given the choice and required to accept all money, good and bad, they will tend to keep the money of greater perceived value in their own possession and pass the bad money to others. In short, in the absence of legal tender laws, the seller will not accept anything but money of certain value (good money), but the existence of legal tender laws will cause the buyer to offer only money with the lowest commodity value (bad money), as the creditor must accept such money at face value.

== Analogies in other fields ==
Sometimes the principles of Gresham's law may be applied to different fields of study. Gresham's law may be generally applied to any circumstance in which the true value of something is markedly different from the value people are required to accept, due to factors such as lack of information or governmental decree.

Former United States Vice President Spiro Agnew used Gresham's law in describing American news media, stating that "Bad news drives out good news", although his argument was closer to that of "a race to the bottom" for higher ratings rather than over- and under-valuing certain kinds of news.

Gregory Bateson postulated an analogue to Gresham's law operating in cultural evolution and social change. He stated that "oversimplified ideas will always displace the sophisticated and the vulgar and hateful will always displace the beautiful. And yet the beautiful persists."

In the market for used cars, lemon automobiles (analogous to bad currency) will drive out the good cars. The problem is one of asymmetry of information. Sellers have a strong financial incentive to pass all used cars off as good cars, especially lemons. This makes it difficult to buy a good car at a fair price, as the buyer risks overpaying for a lemon. The result is that buyers will only pay the fair price of a lemon, so at least they reduce the risk of overpaying. High-quality cars tend to be pushed out of the market, because there is no good way to establish that they really are worth more. Certified pre-owned programs are an attempt to mitigate this problem by providing a warranty and other guarantees of quality. The Market for Lemons is a work that examines this problem in more detail. It was alleged that The Nature Conservancy offered cheap, yet "meaningless", carbon credits by purchasing cheap land unlikely to be logged anyway, rather than expensive and valuable land at risk of logging.

A corollary entitled, Hughes' law, exists in moral philosophy, stating that, "The evil acts of bad men elicit from better men acts which, under better circumstances, would also be called evil."

In behavioural sciences and organisational psychology: Equity Theory shows how equality results in the devaluation of merit. The extra effort, time, or cost to achieve excellence is an overhead that must offer a sufficient return to be justified. If the mediocre gain status for less investment, they will have an evolutionary advantage.

== See also ==
- Adverse selection
- Demurrage currency
- Free silver
- Inflation
- Junk silver, coins collected specifically for the value of their silver content
- Lemon socialism
- List of eponymous laws
- List of multiple discoveries
- Metal theft
- Penny debate in the United States
- Seigniorage
- Worse is better
