= Toren =

Toren may refer to:

== People ==
- Carl-Axel Torén (1887–1961), a Swedish equestrian
- Märta Torén (1925–1957), a Swedish actress
- Toren Smith (1960-2013), a Canadian translator of manga

== Fictional characters ==
- Graf Toren, DC Comics character
- Sandrilene fa Toren book character created by Tamora Pierce

== Places and buildings ==
- Toren van Goedereede
- Toren de Vlinder
- KEMA Toren
- Koningin Juliana Toren
- Nieuwe Toren, Kampen
- Vesteda Toren

== Works ==
- Toren (video game), 2015 video game
