= Adam Fergusson (MEP) =

British journalist, author and politician

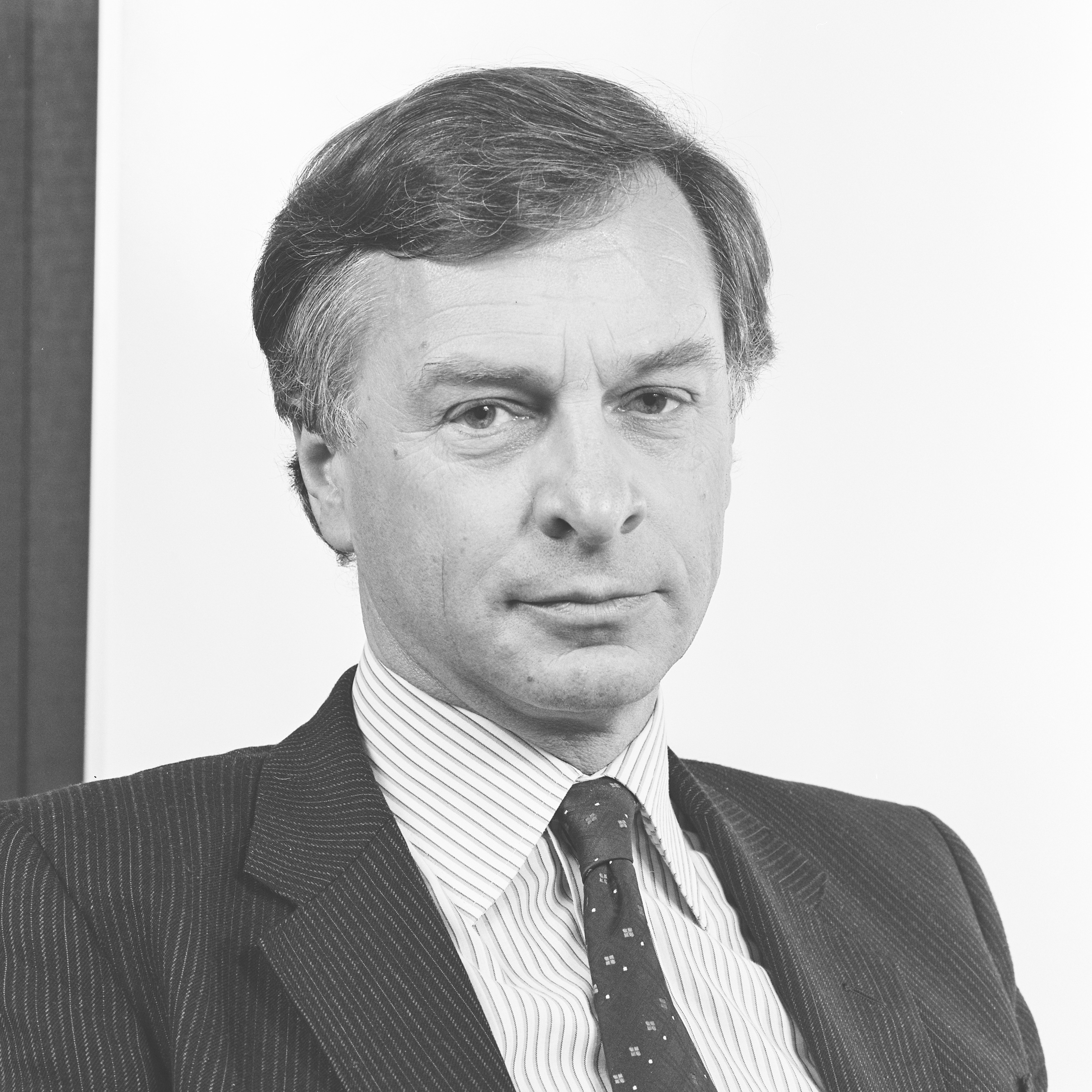
European Parliament portrait

Adam Dugdale Fergusson (born 10 July 1932) is a British journalist, author and Conservative Party politician who served one term in the European Parliament as an MEP. He has remained involved in the field of European Union affairs since, as a Special Adviser to Conservative governments and as a business consultant. Among other books, he wrote When Money Dies (1975), a classic account of hyperinflation in the Weimar Republic.

== Early career ==
Fergusson is the second son of Sir James Fergusson, 8th Baronet of Kilkerran and the younger brother of Sir Charles Fergusson, the present 9th Baronet of Kilkerran. His sister, Alice, is married to Baron Renton of Mount Harry. He attended Eton and Trinity College, Cambridge, where he read History, graduating in 1955. He went into journalism on the Glasgow Herald, working as a Leader-writer in 1957–58 and as Diplomatic Correspondent from 1959 to 1961.

== The Times ==
Leaving the Herald, Fergusson moved to The Statist, a journal for economists and businessmen. He was Foreign Editor of the Statist from 1964 until it ceased publication in 1967, afterwards joining The Times as a feature-writer specialising on political, economic and environmental matters. He was at the Times for ten years, also using his time to write fiction, including Roman Go Home (1969) and The Lost Embassy (1972), as well as the non-fiction The Sack of Bath (1973).

== Anti-devolution campaigning ==
In the late 1970s Fergusson became active in Conservative politics. As a firm opponent of devolution, he spoke at conferences trying to persuade the Conservatives to oppose the Scottish Assembly; after this campaign was successful, he was a member of the "Scotland Says No" campaign for the devolution referendum. At the 1979 elections to the European Parliament, Fergusson fought the Strathclyde West constituency, which had seemed safe for Labour; however, a collapse in the Labour vote saw him elected by 1,827 votes.

== European Parliament ==
For three years, Fergusson acted as spokesman for the European Democratic Group on political affairs. He supported calls for a boycott of the Moscow Olympics, arguing that the invasion of Afghanistan and the internal exile of Andrei Sakharov showed the two sides of the Soviet Union: "Aggression without, and oppression within". When Barbara Castle criticised the expenses of the European Parliament, he described her as "the single most damaging export the United Kingdom has on its hands today".

When in 1982 the European Union proposed that the electoral system for European Parliament elections be changed to the party list, Fergusson led the Conservative MEPs' opposition. He kept up constant pressure on the government of Poland over its crackdown on Solidarity, and condemned not only the USSR over the shootdown of Korean Air Flight 007, but the Greek government (which had failed to issue its own condemnation). He was a rapporteur in late 1983, bringing in a report which called for European co-operation on arms manufacture; and for a proposal to install an Empty Chair in the parliament, symbolically waiting for Eastern European countries to be liberated and join the European Community.

For 20 years from 1981, Fergusson was a vice-president of the Pan-European Union.

== 1984 election campaign ==
At the 1984 election, Fergusson opted out of defending his seat in Strathclyde, and instead fought London Central where the sitting MEP Sir David Nicolson was standing down. He found it sad that people could vote for an opponent (Stan Newens), who had opposed EEC entry, but on election day Newens won the seat by 13,000 votes.

== Subsequent career ==
Fergusson was Special Adviser on European Affairs to the Foreign and Commonwealth Office from 1985 to 1989. He then set up as a consultant on European affairs. Fergusson also continued journalism, and contributed to the rebuilding of the City of Bath (he was honorary Vice-President of the Bath Preservation Trust from 1997). His polemic, The Sack of Bath, was first published in 1973 and is a record of how, in the space of a few years, and in the name of modernisation and redevelopment, the city was robbed of its architectural "undergrowth"; and of how ugly new developments damaged a unique part of the European heritage.

Remaining fully committed to the European ideal, Fergusson derided the Conservative Party's approach to the 1999 European Parliament elections in a joint letter which wished for a manifesto "more like that of the Pro-Euro Conservative Party".

== Literary career ==
Fergusson's most notable book is When Money Dies: The Nightmare of Deficit Spending, Devaluation, and Hyperinflation in Weimar Germany. It deals with not only the economic impacts that hyperinflation had upon society in the Weimar Republic, but also the way that society itself changed. Societal norms were broken down in the wake of hyperinflation, and Fergusson approaches this topic. First published by W. Kimber in 1975, When Money Dies was hailed as a cult classic during the 2008 financial crisis, with copies selling on eBay for up to $1,000. As a result, When Money Dies was republished in July 2010, becoming an internet sensation after allegedly being commended by financier Warren Buffett.

Other works Fergusson has published in his later years include a novel, Scone, a political satire on the effects of devolution in Scotland, which was published in 2005. He was elected a Fellow of the Royal Society of Literature in 2009.

== Personal life ==
He was married for 44 years to Penelope Hughes (d.2009), with whom he has four children, James, Petra, Lucy and Marcus, and thirteen grandchildren. He lives in London.
