= Tatiana Fabeck =

Luxembourgish architect

Tatiana Fabeck (born 4 July 1970) is a Luxembourgish architect who since 1996 has run her own business in Koerich, Luxembourg.

Fabeck was born in Luxembourg City. After completing her schooling at the Lycée Michel Rodange, Fabeck studied architecture at the École Spéciale d'Architecture in Paris where she graduated in 1994.

In 2011, she won first prize in the competition Vivre sans voiture (Living without a car) aimed at designing housing without garages or parking spaces in the Limpertsberg district of Luxembourg City to allow for more living space. In 2008, she won the competition for the Maison des sciences humaines in Belval, part of the expanding University of Luxembourg. Fabeck has also been successful in a number of other competitions organised by the City of Luxembourg including the Plan lumière (together with the Frenchman Yann Kersalé) in 2006.
