= Hyperinflation in the Weimar Republic =

Period of extreme inflation in Germany (1921–1923)

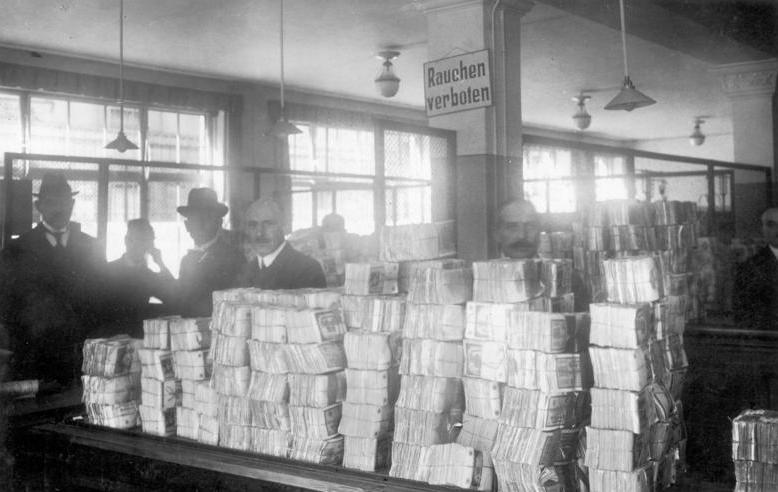
Piles of new Notgeld banknotes awaiting distribution at the Reichsbank during the hyperinflation

Hyperinflation affected the German Papiermark, the currency of the Weimar Republic, between 1921 and 1923, primarily in 1923. The German currency had seen significant inflation during the First World War due to the way in which the German government funded its war effort through borrowing, with debts of 156 billion marks by 1918. This national debt was substantially increased by 50 billion marks of reparations payable in cash and in-kind (e.g., with coal and timber) under the May 1921 London Schedule of Payments agreed after the Versailles treaty.

This inflation continued into the post-war period, particularly when in August 1921 the German central bank began buying hard cash with paper currency at any price, which they claimed was to pay reparations in hard cash, though little in the way of cash reparations payments were made until 1924. The currency stabilised in early 1922, but then hyperinflation took off: the exchange value of the mark fell from 320 marks per dollar in mid-1922 to 7,400 marks per US dollar by December 1922. This hyperinflation continued into 1923, and by November 1923, one US dollar was worth 4,210,500,000,000 marks. Various measures were introduced by German authorities to address this, including a new currency called the Rentenmark, backed by mortgage bonds, later itself replaced by the Reichsmark, and the blocking of the national bank from printing further paper currency.

By 1924 the currency had stabilised and German reparations payments began again under the Dawes Plan. As the catastrophic fall in the value of the mark had effectively wiped out debts owed, some debts (e.g. mortgages) were revalued so that the lenders could recoup some of their money.

Hyperinflation caused considerable internal political instability in the country. Historians and economists are divided on the causes of this hyperinflation, particularly the extent to which it was caused by reparations payments.

== Background ==
=== Inflation during the First World War ===
To pay for the large costs of the First World War, Germany suspended the gold standard (the convertibility of its currency to gold) when the war broke out in 1914. Unlike France, which imposed its first income tax to pay for the war, German Emperor Wilhelm II and the Reichstag decided unanimously to fund the war entirely by borrowing rather than risk angering the public with new taxes.

This decision was based on the assumption that Germany would easily win the war, allowing it to impose war reparations on the defeated Allies. This was to be done by annexing resource-rich industrial territory in the west and east and imposing cash payments to Germany, similar to the French indemnity that followed German victory over France in 1870. However, the exchange rate of the mark against the US dollar steadily devalued from 4.2 to 7.9 marks per dollar between 1914 and 1918, a preliminary warning of the extreme postwar inflation.

This strategy failed as Germany lost the war, which left the new Weimar Republic saddled with massive war debts that it could not afford: the national debt stood at 156 billion marks in 1918. The debt problem was exacerbated by the new government being forced to print money without any economic resources to back it.

John Maynard Keynes characterised the inflationary policies of various wartime governments in his 1919 book The Economic Consequences of the Peace as follows:

The inflationism of the currency systems of Europe has proceeded to extraordinary lengths. The various belligerent Governments, unable, or too timid or too short-sighted to secure from loans or taxes the resources they required, have printed notes for the balance.

=== Inflation immediately after the First World War ===
The value of the German currency continued to fall in the immediate aftermath of the war. By late 1919, the German government had signed the Treaty of Versailles, which included an agreement to pay substantial reparations to the Allied powers both in hard cash and in in-kind shipments of goods such as coal and timber. By then, 48 paper marks were required to buy a US dollar. In May 1921 the amount to be paid by the Central Powers as a whole was fixed at 132 billion gold marks under the London Schedule of payments which set quarterly deadlines for payments. Of this, 50 billion gold marks was listed in A and B bonds payable under the quarterly deadlines in the schedule; the remaining sum, about 82 billion gold marks, was listed as C bonds that were somewhat hypothetical and not payable under the schedule but instead left to an undefined future date, with the Germans being informed that they realistically would not have to pay them.

The German currency was relatively stable at about 90 marks per dollar during the first half of 1921. Because the Western Front of the war had been mostly fought in France and Belgium, Germany came out of the war with most of its industrial infrastructure intact, leaving it in a better place economically than neighbouring France and Belgium.

The first payment of one billion gold marks was made when it came due in June 1921. At this point, customs posts in the west of Germany were occupied by Allied officials, so that the schedule of payments could be enforced. However, following the first payment the Allied officials were withdrawn from everywhere but Düsseldorf, and whilst some payments in kind continued, only small cash payments were subsequently made for the remainder of 1921–22.

From August 1921, the president of the Reichsbank, Rudolf Havenstein, began a strategy of buying foreign currency with marks at any price, without any regard for inflation, and it only increased the speed of the collapse in value of the mark. German officials claimed this was in order to make cash payments owed to the Allies using foreign currency. British and French experts stated that this was in an effort to ruin the German currency and, as well as escaping the need for budgetary reform, avoid paying reparations altogether, a claim supported by Reich Chancellery records showing that delaying the currency and budgetary reform that could have addressed hyperinflation was seen as advantageous. Whilst ruinous to the economy and politically destabilising, hyperinflation had advantageous aspects for the German government as, although the war reparations were not listed in paper currency, domestic debts owed from the war were listed, meaning that inflation greatly reduced this debt relative to revenues.

Weimar Republic hyperinflation from one to a trillion paper marks per gold mark; values on logarithmic scale.

In the first half of 1922, the mark stabilized at about 320 marks per dollar. International conferences were held. One, in June 1922, was organized by US investment banker J. P. Morgan, Jr. The meetings produced no workable solution. Further, the well-respected recent head of the Reich Ministry for Reconstruction and then-present German foreign minister Walther Rathenau was assassinated 22 June 1922, causing widespread national distress and protest. Inflation erupted into hyperinflation, the mark falling to 7,400 marks per US dollar by December 1922. The cost-of-living index was 41 in June 1922 and 685 in December, a nearly 17-fold increase.

After Germany failed for the thirty-fourth time in thirty-six months to pay an installment of in-kind reparations of coal, in January 1923 French and Belgian troops occupied the Ruhr valley, Germany's main industrial region. 900 million gold marks of reparations were ultimately secured this way.

The German government's response was to order a policy of passive resistance in the Ruhr, with workers being told to do nothing which helped the French and Belgians in any way. While this policy, in practice, amounted to a general strike to protest the occupation, the striking workers still had to be given financial support. The government paid these workers by printing more and more banknotes, with Germany soon being swamped with paper money, exacerbating the hyperinflation even further.

== Hyperinflation ==
A loaf of bread in Berlin that cost around 160 marks at the end of 1922 cost 200 billion marks by late 1923.

By November 1923, one US dollar was worth 4.2105 trillion German marks.

=== Money gallery ===
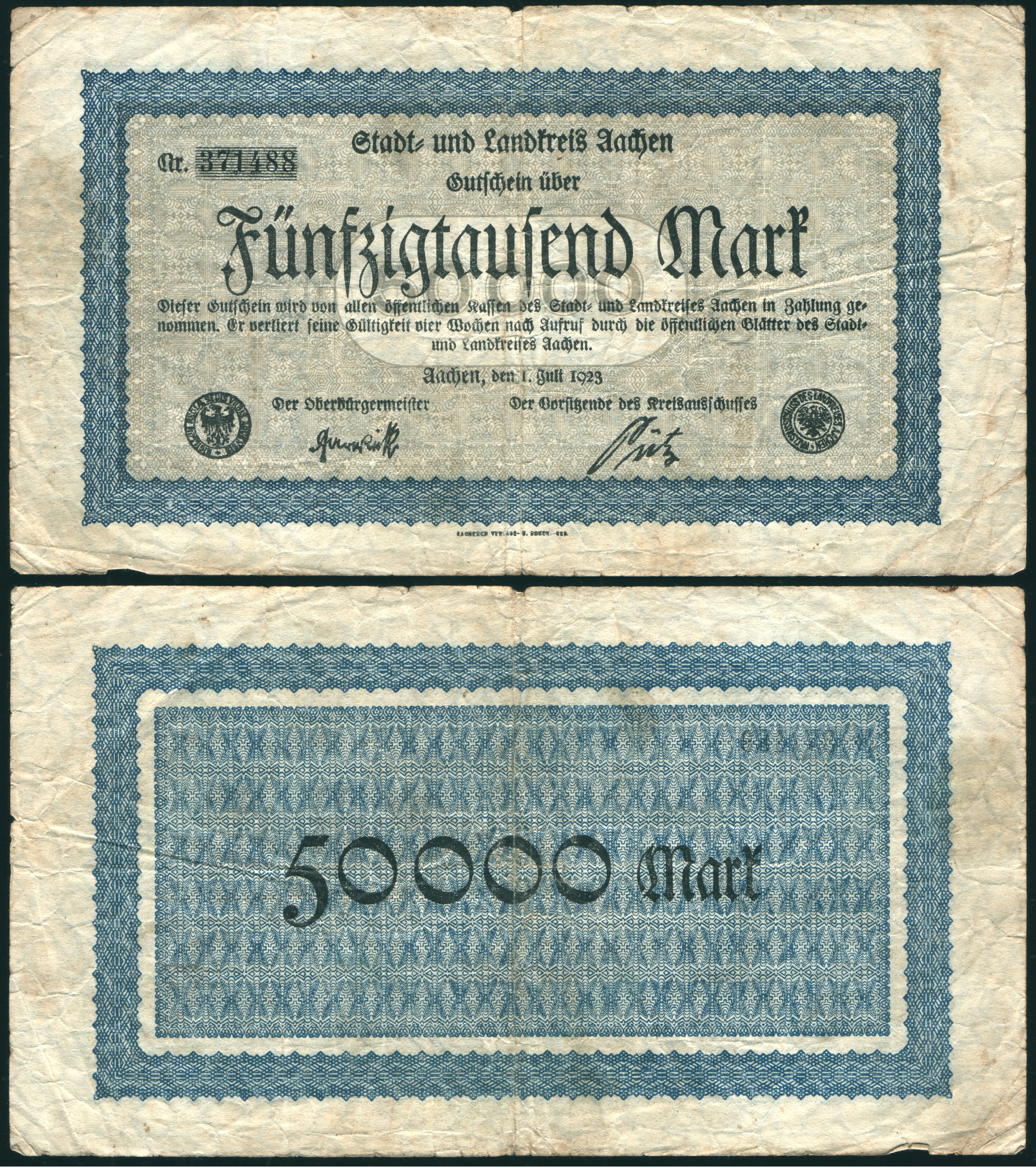
50,000 marks, Aachen, 1923

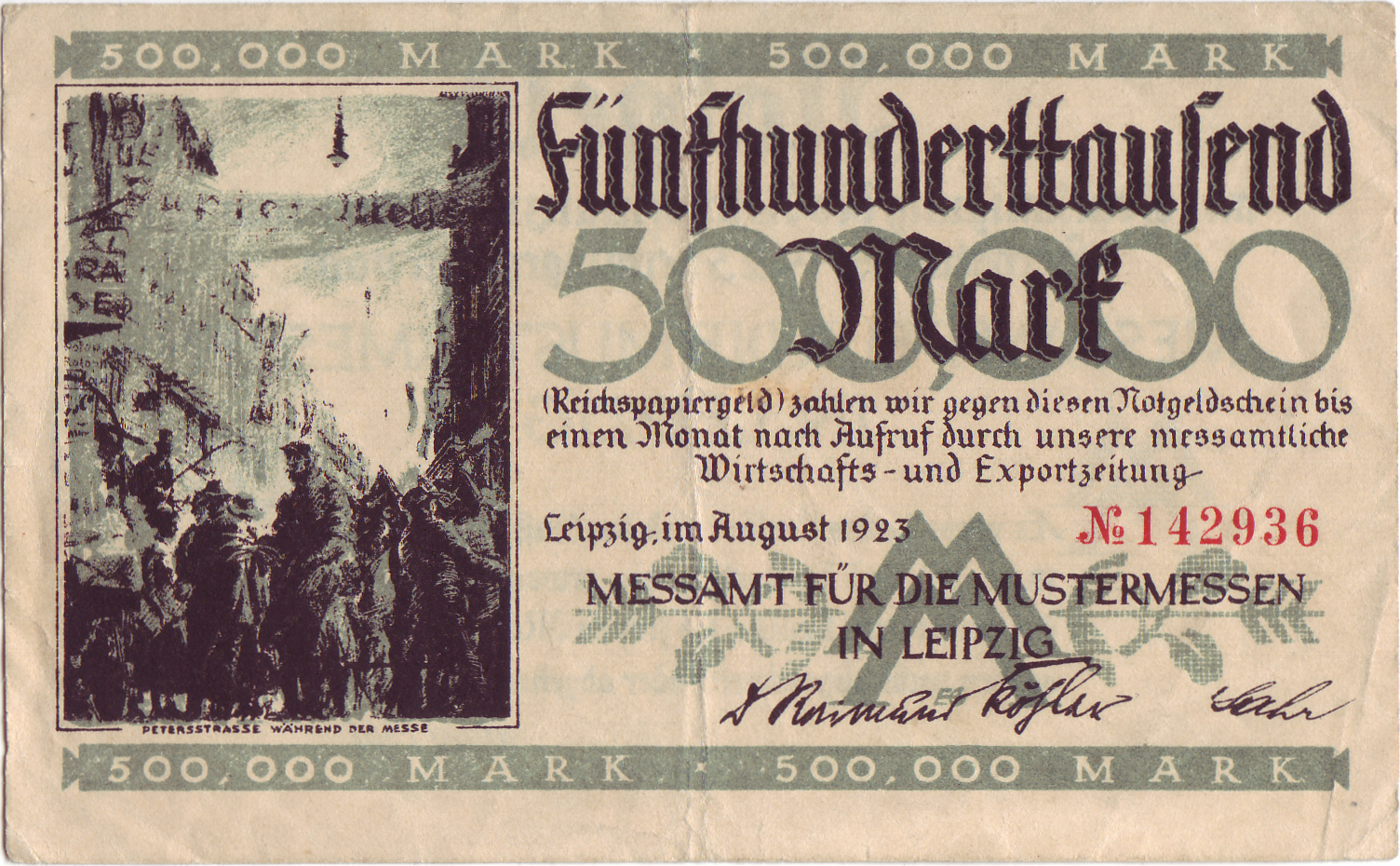
500,000 marks, Leipzig, 1923

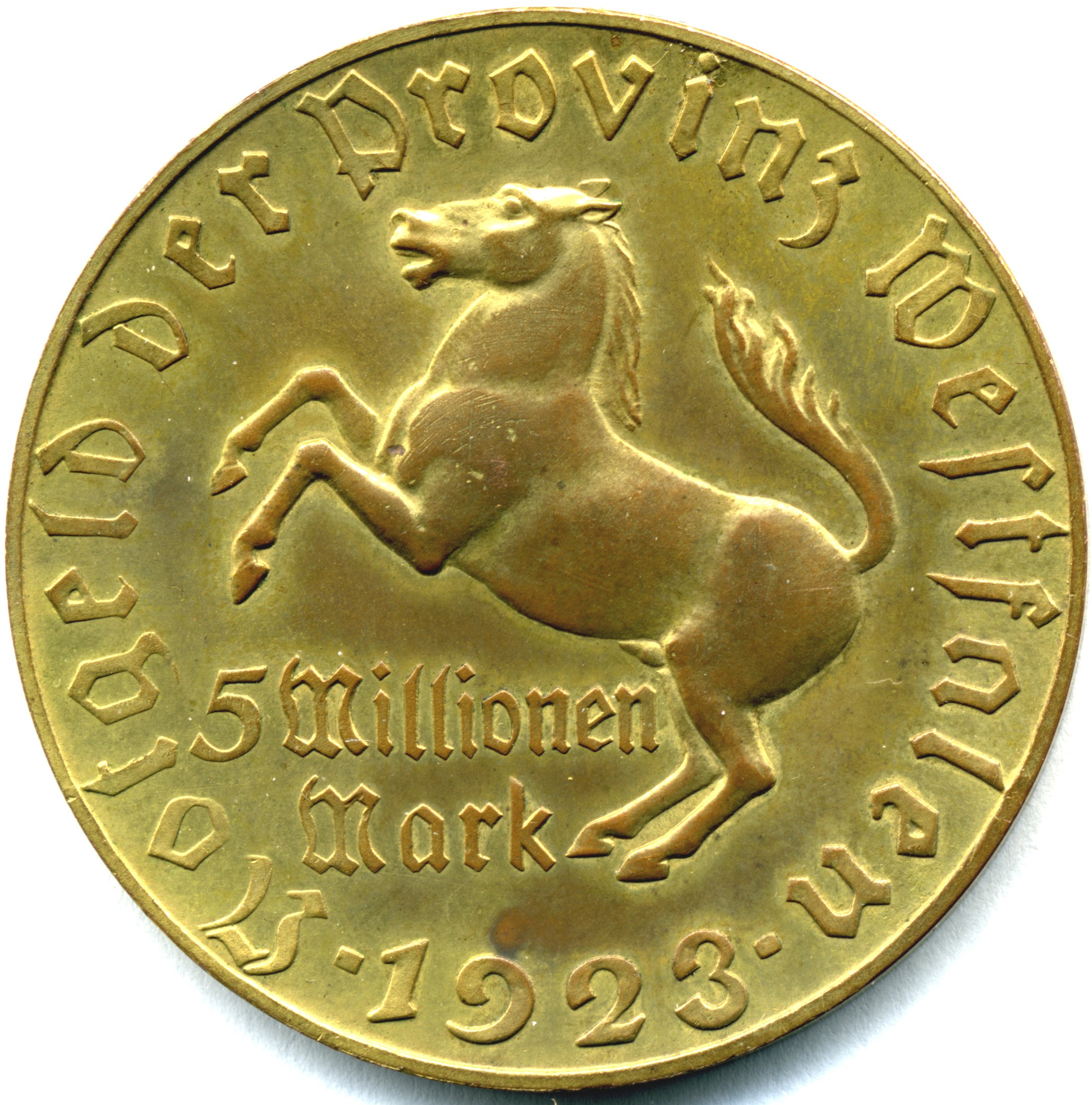
A 5 Million Mark coin, Westphalia, 1923

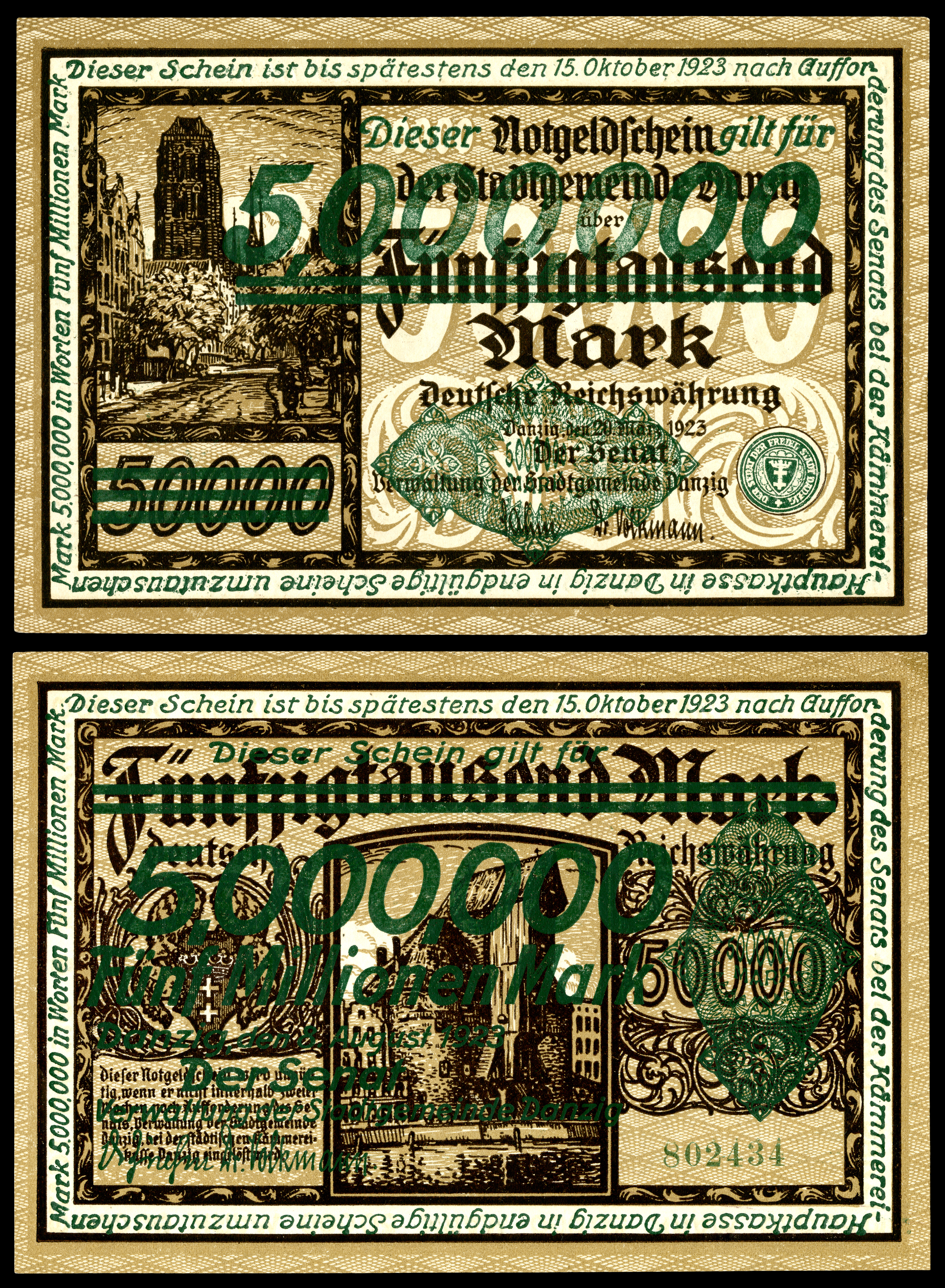
5,000,000 marks (overprint of 50,000 marks), Danzig, 1923

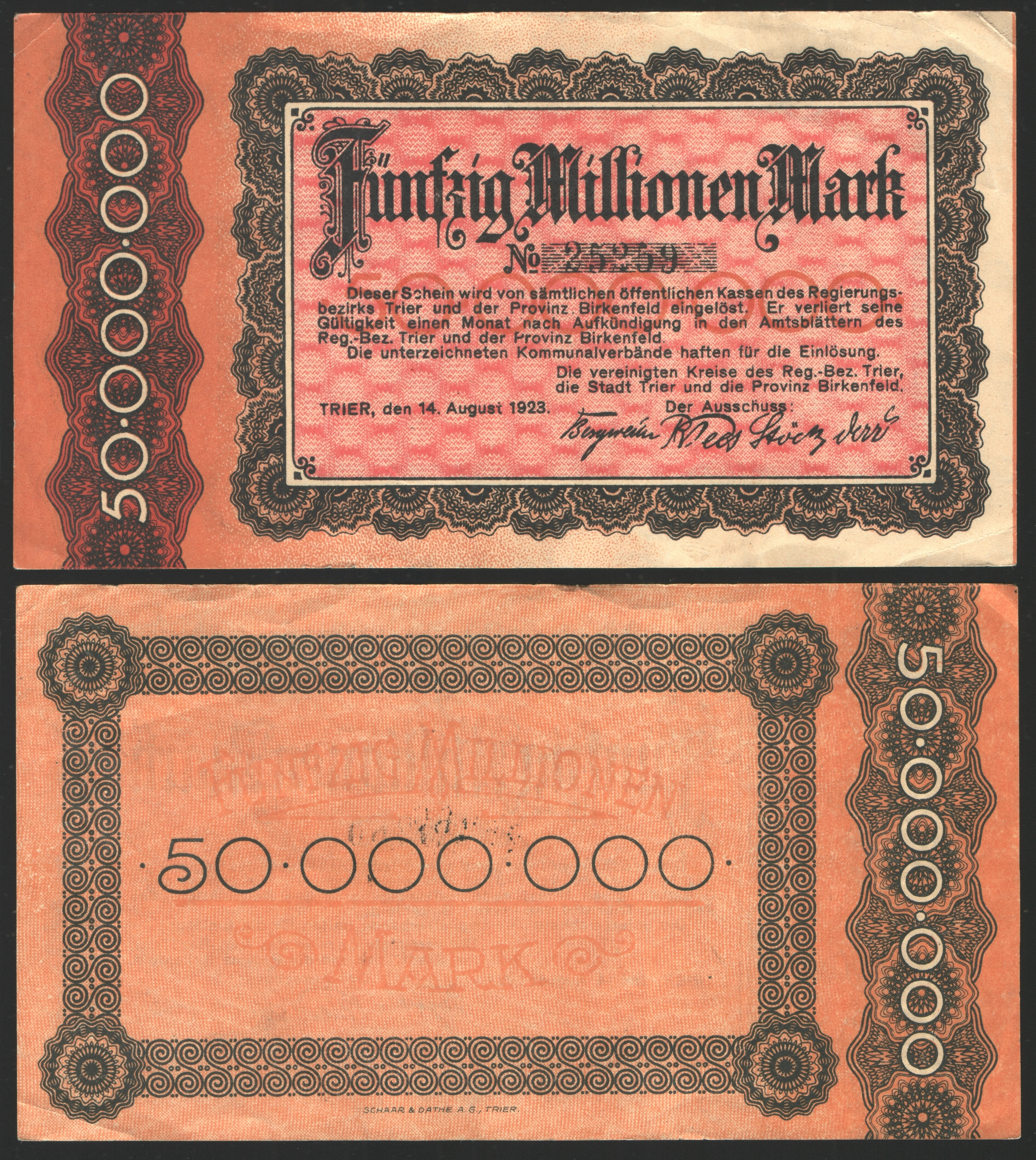
50,000,000 marks, Trier, 1923

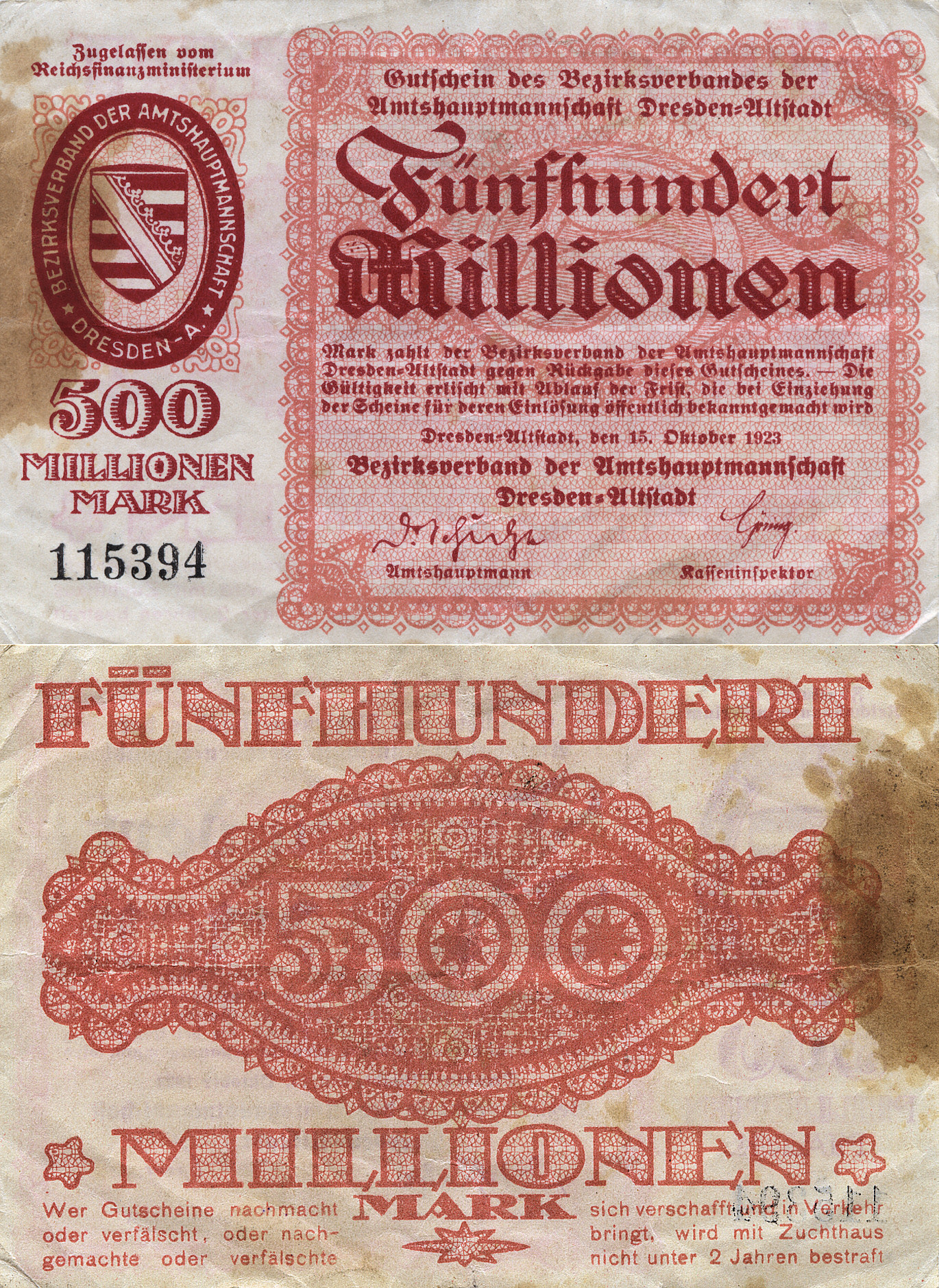
500,000,000 marks, Dresden, 1923

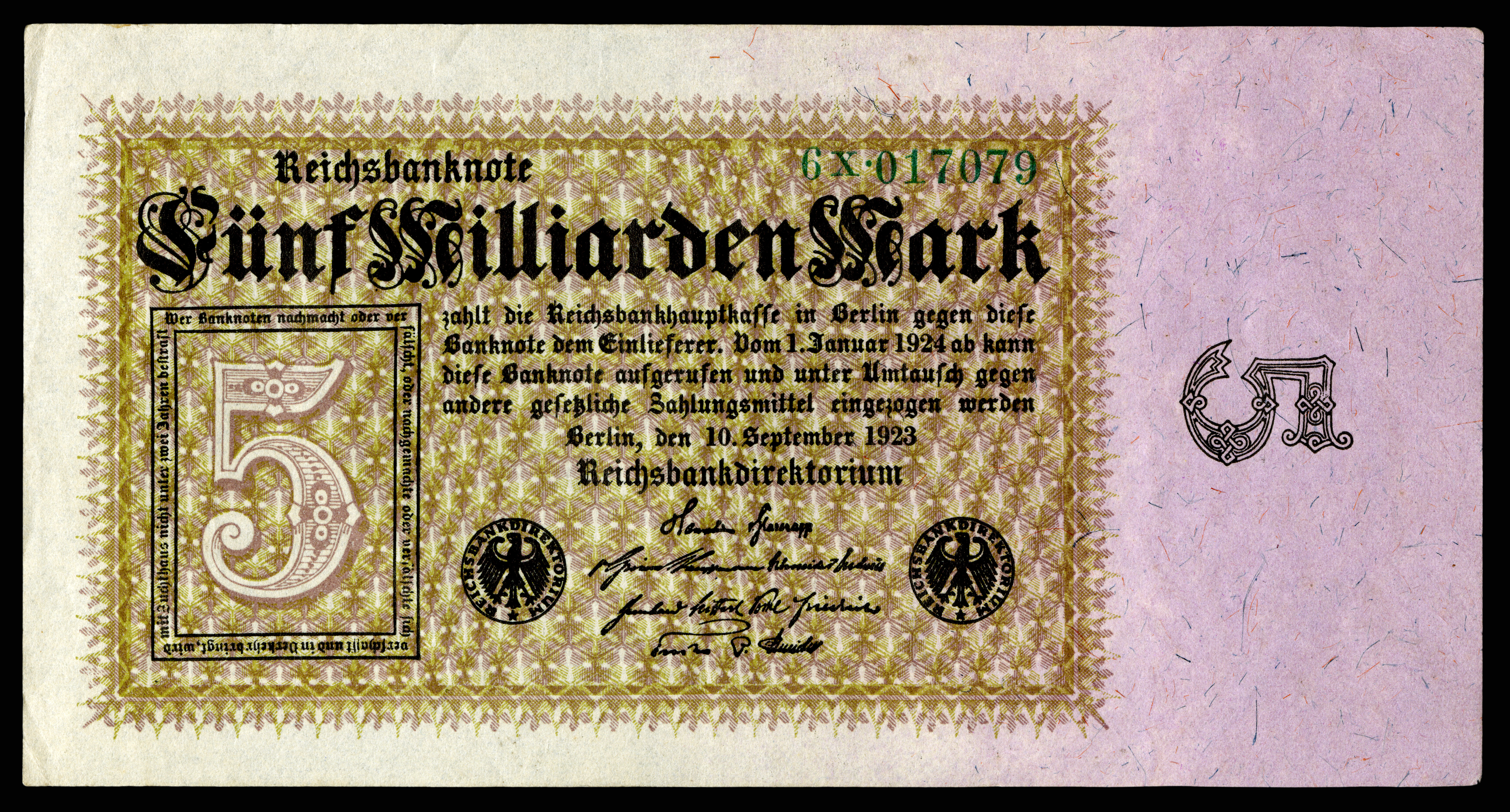
5 billion (5 Milliarden) marks, Berlin, 1923

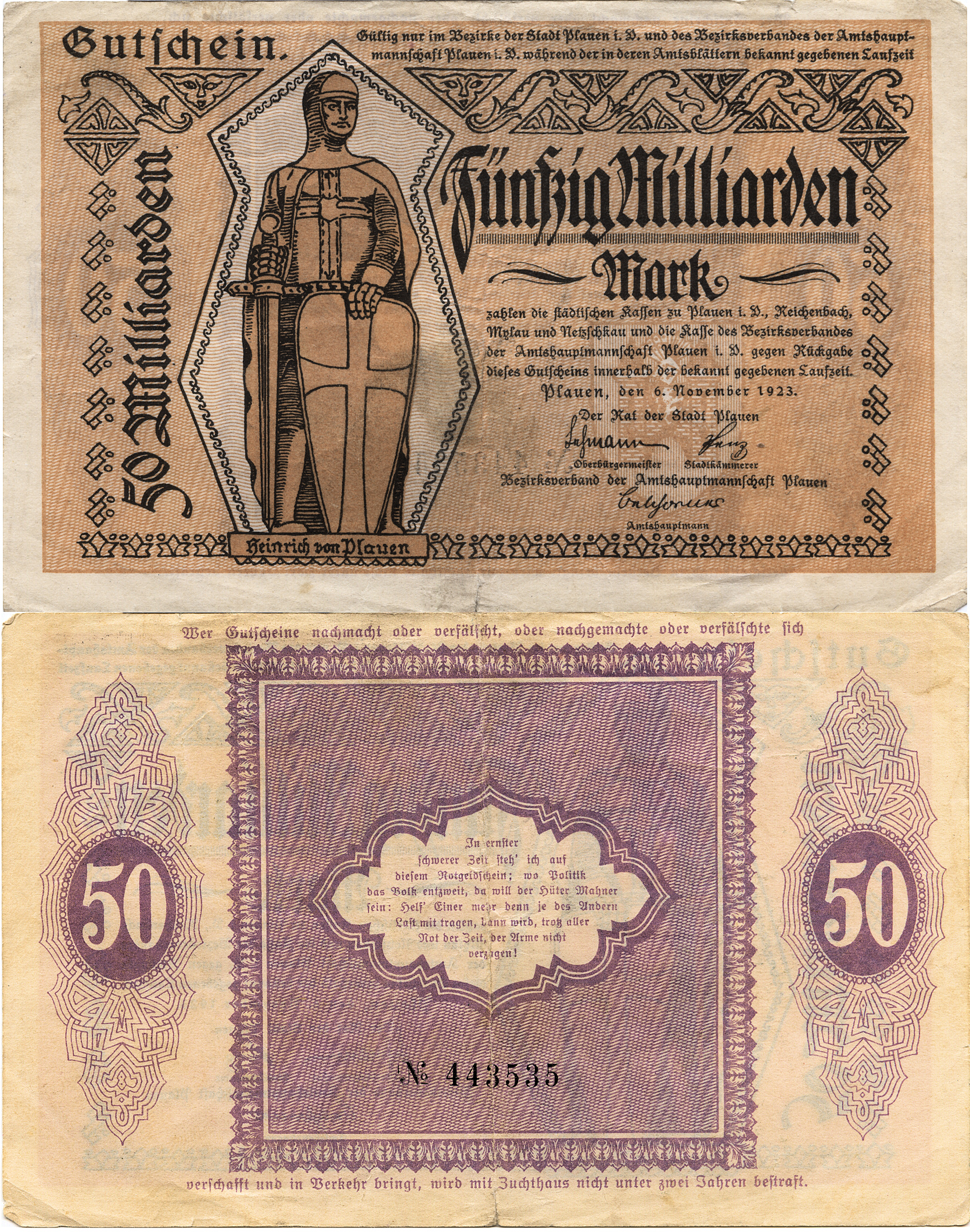
50 billion (50 Milliarden) marks, Plauen, 1923

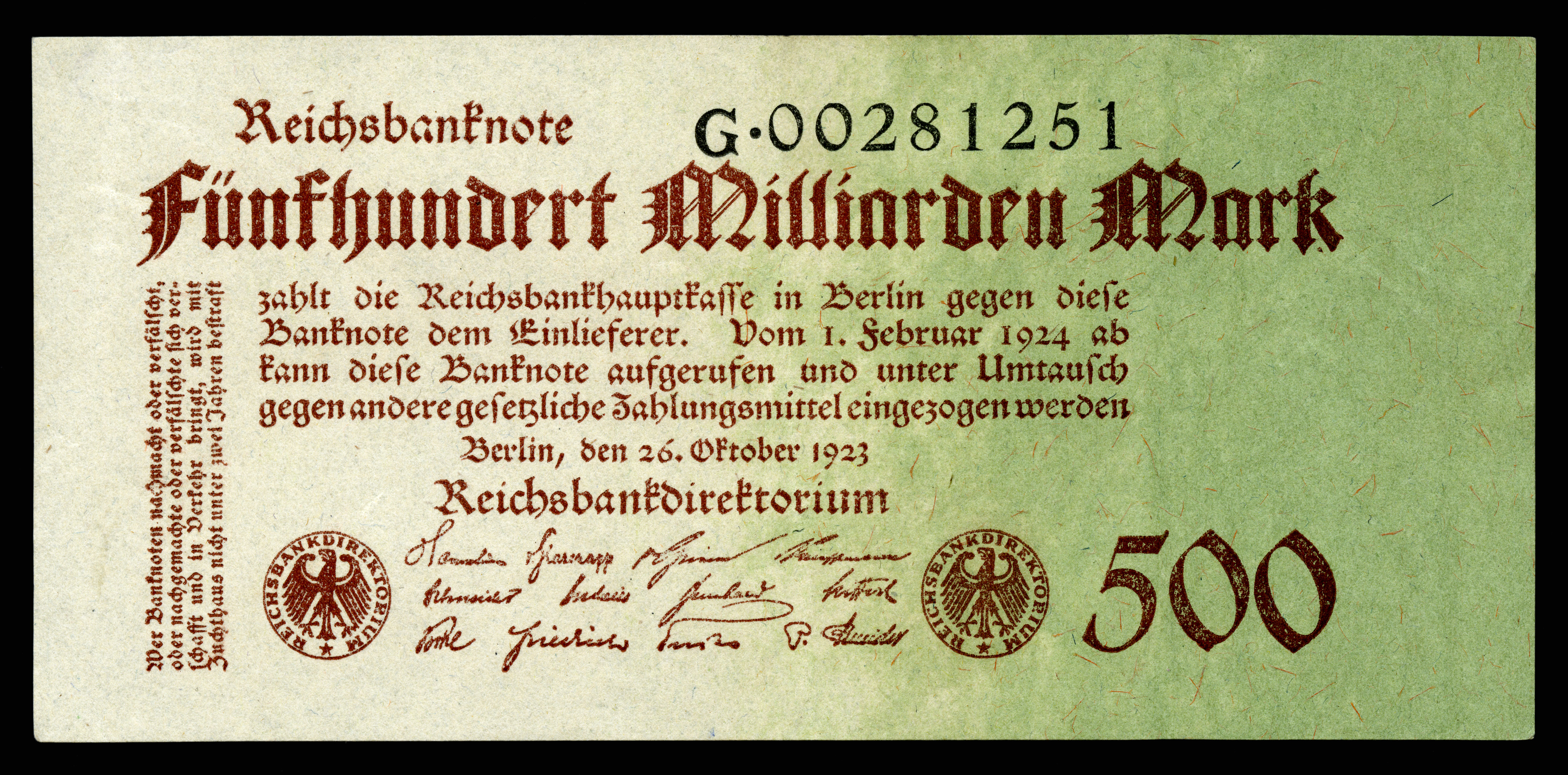
500 billion (500 Milliarden) marks, Berlin, 1923

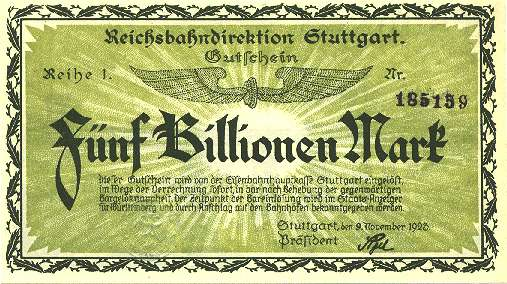
5 trillion (5 Billionen) marks, Stuttgart, 1923

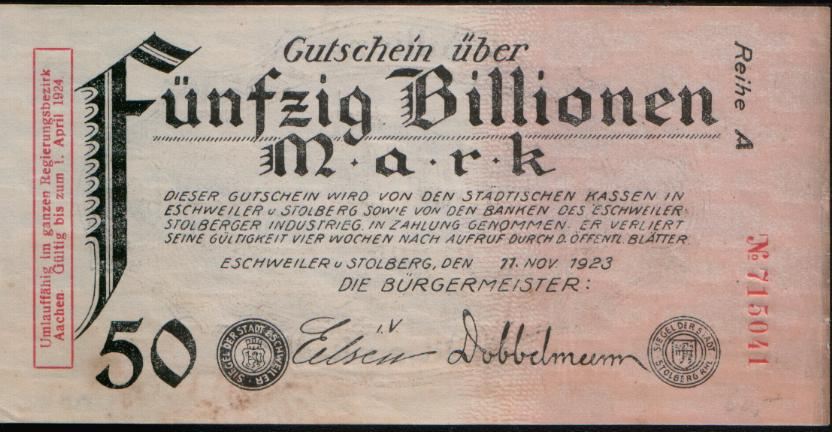
50 trillion (50 Billionen) marks Eschweiler, 1923

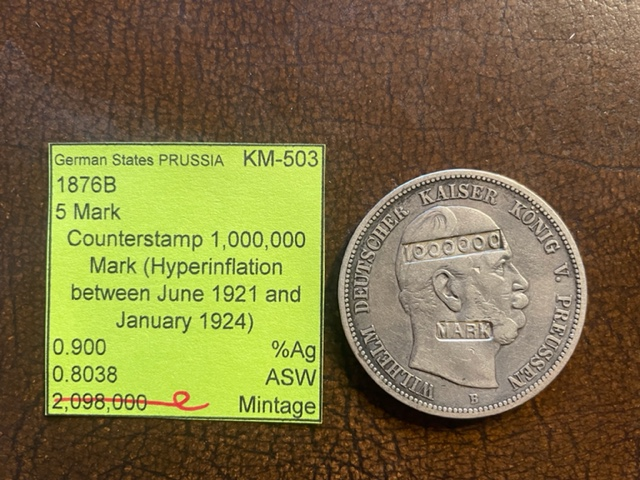
Aachen, 1,000,000 mark сounterstamp on 5 mark coin

== Stabilization ==
German monetary economics was at that time heavily influenced by Chartalism and the German Historical School, which conditioned the way the hyperinflation was analysed. The hyperinflation crisis led prominent economists and politicians to seek a means to stabilize German currency. In August 1923, an economist, Karl Helfferich, proposed a plan to issue a new currency, the "Roggenmark" ("rye mark"), to be backed by mortgage bonds indexed to the market price of rye grain. The plan was rejected because of the greatly fluctuating price of rye in paper marks.

Agriculture Minister Hans Luther proposed a plan that substituted gold for rye and led to the issuance of the Rentenmark ("mortgage mark"), backed by bonds indexed to the market price of gold. The gold bonds were indexed at the rate of 2,790 gold marks per kilogram of gold, the same as the pre-war gold marks. Rentenmarks were not redeemable in gold but only indexed to the gold bonds. The plan was adopted in monetary reform decrees on 13–15 October 1923. A new bank, the Rentenbank, was set up by Hans Luther when he became Finance Minister.

During the final stages of hyperinflation, widespread loss of confidence in the mark led people to use alternative forms of exchange. Among these were commodity-based monies, such as a cigarette-based currency. Cigarettes, due to being easily divisible and internationally acceptable, bought goods that paper marks could not. Although never formally declared as legal tender, cigarettes became widely accepted as a medium of exchange. Cigarettes began to be widely viewed as "good money" while the depreciating Reichsmark was seen as "bad money," partially reversing Gresham's law. People also held coins and other tangible goods in anticipation of a currency reform.

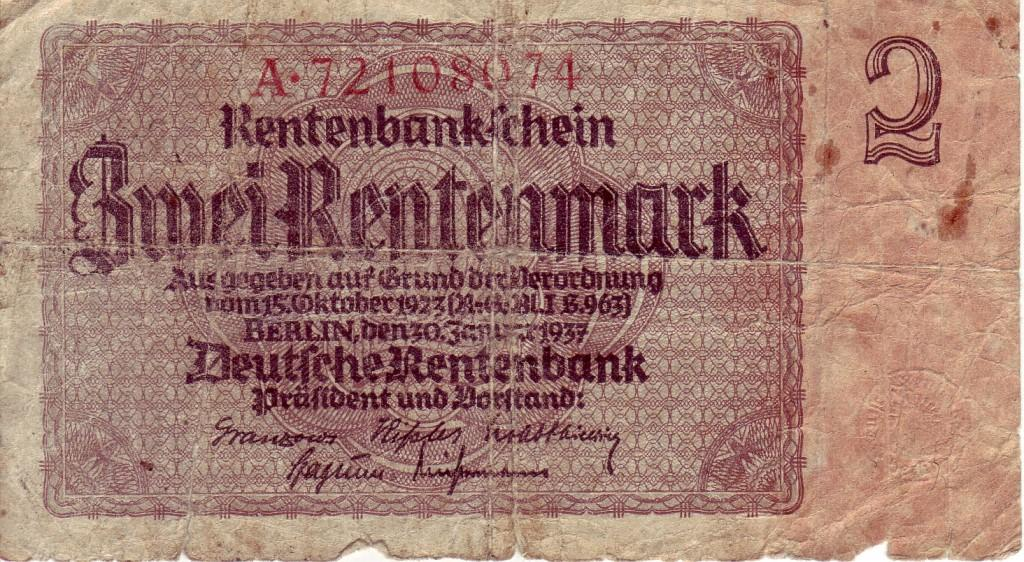
Two Rentenmark note, issued in line with the Decree of 15 October 1923

After 12 November 1923, when Hjalmar Schacht became currency commissioner, Germany's central bank (the Reichsbank) was not allowed to discount any further government Treasury bills, which meant the corresponding issue of paper marks also ceased. The discounting of commercial trade bills was allowed and the amount of Rentenmarks expanded, but the issue was strictly controlled to conform to current commercial and government transactions. The Rentenbank refused credit to the government and to speculators who were not able to borrow Rentenmarks, because Rentenmarks were not legal tender.

On 16 November 1923, the new Rentenmark was introduced to replace the worthless paper marks issued by the Reichsbank. Twelve zeros were cut from prices, and the prices quoted in the new currency remained stable.

When the president of the Reichsbank, Rudolf Havenstein, died on 20 November 1923, Schacht was appointed to replace him. By 30 November 1923, there were 500,000,000 Rentenmarks in circulation, which increased to 1,000,000,000 by 1 January 1924, and to 1,800,000,000 Rentenmarks by July 1924. Meanwhile, the old paper Marks continued in circulation. The total paper marks increased to 1.2 sextillion (1,200,000,000,000,000,000,000) in July 1924 and continued to fall in value to a third of their conversion value in Rentenmarks.

On 30 August 1924, a monetary law permitted the exchange of a 1-trillion paper mark note to a new Reichsmark, worth the same as a Rentenmark. By 1924 one dollar was equivalent to 4.2 Rentenmark.

== Revaluation ==
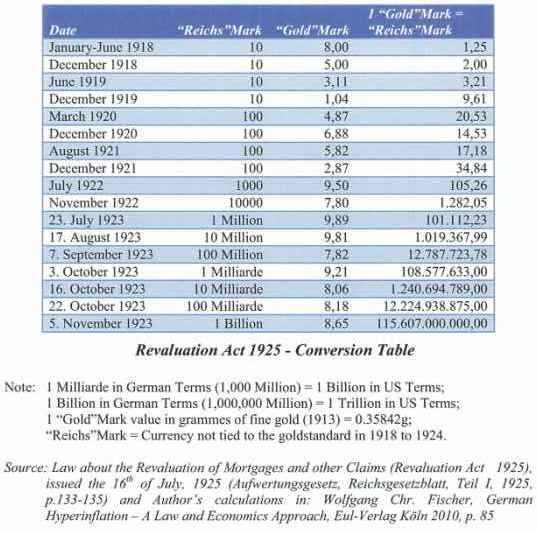
Conversion table

Eventually, some debts were reinstated to compensate creditors partially for the catastrophic reduction in the value of debts that had been quoted in paper marks before the hyperinflation. A decree of 1925 reinstated some mortgages at 25% of face value in the new currency, effectively 25,000,000,000 times their value in the old paper marks, if they had been held for at least five years. Similarly, some government bonds were reinstated at 2.5% of face value, to be paid after reparations were paid.

Mortgage debt was reinstated at much higher rates than government bonds were. The reinstatement of some debts and a resumption of effective taxation in a still-devastated economy triggered a wave of corporate bankruptcies.

One of the important issues of the stabilization of a hyperinflation is the revaluation. The term normally refers to the raising of the exchange rate of one national currency against other currencies. As well, it can mean revalorization, the restoration of the value of a currency depreciated by inflation. The German government had the choice of a revaluation law to finish the hyperinflation quickly or of allowing sprawling and the political and violent disturbances on the streets. The government argued in detail that the interests of creditors and debtors had to be fair and balanced. Neither the living standard price index nor the share price index was judged as relevant.

The calculation of the conversion relation was considerably judged to the dollar index as well as to the wholesale price index. In principle, the German government followed the line of market-oriented reasoning that the dollar index and the wholesale price index would roughly indicate the true price level in general over the period of high inflation and hyperinflation. In addition, the revaluation was bound on the exchange rate mark and United States dollar to obtain the value of the Goldmark.

Finally, the Law on the Revaluation of Mortgages and other Claims of 16 July 1925 (Gesetz über die Aufwertung von Hypotheken und anderen Ansprüchen or Aufwertungsgesetze) included only the ratio of the paper mark to the gold mark for the period from 1 January 1918, to 30 November 1923, and the following days. The galloping inflation thus caused the end of a principle, "a mark is worth a mark", which had been recognized, the nominal value principle.

The law was challenged in the Supreme Court of the German Reich (Reichsgericht), but its 5th Senate ruled, on 4 November 1925, that the law was constitutional, even according to the Bill of Rights and Duties of Germans (Articles 109, 134, 152 and 153 of the Constitution). The case set a precedent for judicial review in German jurisprudence.

== Causes ==
Historians and economists differ over the causes of the German hyperinflation, particularly on the subject of whether it was caused by reparations payments.

The Treaty of Versailles had imposed an undefined debt on Germany, which the London Schedule of Payments agreed in May 1921 had determined to be essentially 50 billion marks in A and B bonds payable partly in-kind with goods like coal and timber, and partly in gold and hard-cash. From June 1921, when a single payment of 1 billion gold marks was paid (roughly 1.4% of Germany's nominal 1925 GNP), until the agreement of the Dawes plan in late 1924, only relatively small cash payments were made by Germany, though partial in-kind payments continued. For example, of the 300 million gold marks due under a variable annuity in November 1921, only 13 million was paid, and of the roughly 3 billion gold marks total due under payments in 1922, only 435 million were paid in cash.

Germany's leadership claimed that, with its gold depleted, inflation resulted during 1921–23 due to attempts to buy foreign currency with German currency in an effort to make cash payments as reparations. This would be equivalent to selling German currency in exchange for payment in foreign currency, but the resulting increase in the supply of German marks on the market caused the German mark to fall rapidly in value. However, very little in the way of cash payments were actually made during the period of hyperinflation.

British and French experts claimed that the German leadership were purposefully stoking inflation as a way of avoiding paying reparations, as well as a way of avoiding budgetary reforms – a view later supported by analysis of Reich Chancellery record showing that tax reform and currency stabilisation was delayed in 1922–23 in the hope of reductions in reparations. Particularly, Allied analysis of German statistics showed that printing of paper currency was being used to maintain tax rates much lower than in Allied countries, to fund relatively high levels of state expenditure, and that this effect was being worsened by unrestricted capital flight from Germany. Reparations payments continued more or less in full from 1924 to 1931 without a return of hyperinflation and, after 1930, Germany protested that reparations payments were deflationary. Inflation also enabled the German government to pay off its substantial domestic debts, particularly war debts, in devalued marks.

One point on which historians tend to agree is that the printing of cash by the German government to make payments to striking workers in the Ruhr, who were refusing to make reparations deliveries to the Allies, contributed to hyperinflation. The occupation of the Ruhr also caused German output to fall.

Regardless of the reason for the declining value of the German currency, the decline caused prices of goods to rise rapidly, increasing the cost of operating the German government, which could not be financed by raising taxes because those taxes would be payable in the ever-falling German currency. The resulting deficit was financed by some combination of issuing bonds and simply creating more money: both increasing the supply of German mark-denominated financial assets on the market and so further reducing the currency's price. When the German people realized that their money was rapidly losing value, they tried to spend it quickly. That increased monetary velocity and caused an ever-faster increase in prices, creating a vicious cycle.

The government and the banks had two unacceptable alternatives. If they stopped inflation, there would be immediate bankruptcies, unemployment, strikes, hunger, violence, collapse of civil order, insurrection and possibly even revolution. If they continued the inflation, they would default on their foreign debt. However, attempting to avoid both unemployment and insolvency ultimately failed when Germany had both.

== Aftermath and legacy ==
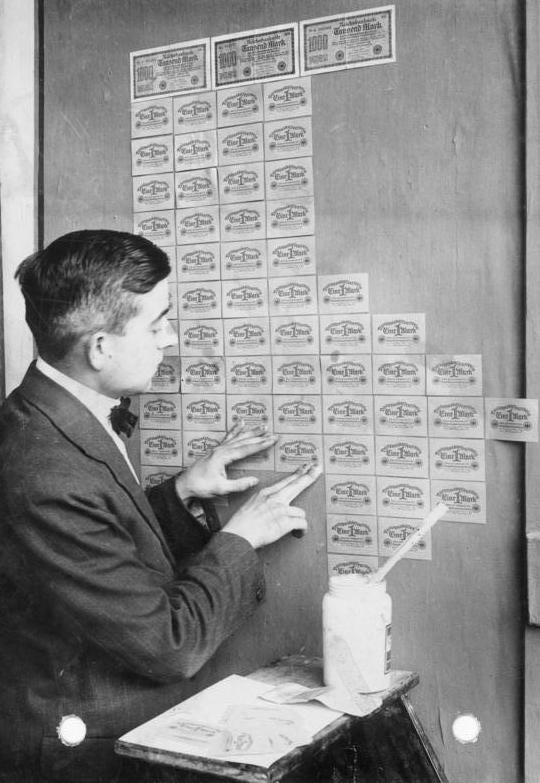
Germany, 1923: banknotes had lost so much value that they were used as wallpaper.

The hyperinflation episode in the Weimar Republic in the early 1920s was not the first or even the most severe instance of inflation in history. However, it has been the subject of the most scholarly economic analysis and debate. The hyperinflation drew significant interest, as many of the dramatic and unusual economic behaviors now associated with hyperinflation were first documented systematically: exponential increases in prices and interest rates, redenomination of the currency, consumer flight from cash to hard assets and the rapid expansion of industries that produced those assets.

Since the hyperinflation, German monetary policy has retained a central concern with the maintenance of a sound currency, a concern that had an effect on the Euro area crisis. According to one study, many Germans conflate hyperinflation in the Weimar Republic with the Great Depression, seeing the two separate events as one big economic crisis that encompassed both rapidly rising prices and mass unemployment.

The hyperinflated, worthless marks became widely collected abroad. The Los Angeles Times estimated in 1924 that more of the decommissioned notes were spread about the US than existed in Germany.

Firms responded to the crisis by focusing on those elements of their information systems they identified as essential to continuing operations. In the beginning the focus was on adjusting sales and procurement arrangements, modifications to financial reporting, and the use of more nonmonetary information in internal reporting. With the continuous acceleration of inflation, human resources were redeployed to the most critical corporate functions, in particular those involved in the remuneration of labor. There is evidence that some parts of corporate accounting systems fell into disrepair, but there was also innovation.

== See also ==
- Andreas Hermes
- Trillionaires
- Zero stroke

== General and cited sources ==
- Ahamed, Liaquat (2009). Lords of Finance: The Bankers Who Broke the World. Penguin Books. ISBN 978-1-59420-182-0.
- Allen, Larry (2009). The Encyclopedia of Money (2nd ed.). Santa Barbara, CA: ABC-CLIO. pp. 219–220. ISBN 978-1598842517.
- Balderston, Theo, prepared for the Economic History Society (2002). Economics and politics in the Weimar Republic (1. publ. ed.). Cambridge [u.a.]: Cambridge Univ. Press. ISBN 0-521-77760-7.
- Costantino Bresciani-Turroni, The Economics of Inflation (English transl.), Northampton, England: Augustus Kelly Publishers, 1937, on the German 1919–1923 inflation.
- Evans, Richard J. (2003). The Coming of the Third Reich. New York City: Penguin Press. ISBN 978-0141009759.
- Feldman, Gerald D. (1996). The great disorder politics, economics, and society in the German inflation, 1914–1924 ([Nachdruck] ed.). New York: Oxford University Press. ISBN 0-19-510114-6.
- Fergusson, Adam (2010). When Money Dies: The Nightmare of Deficit Spending, Devaluation, and Hyperinflation in Weimar Germany (1st [U.S.] ed.). New York: PublicAffairs. ISBN 978-1-58648-994-6.
- Fischer, Wolfgang Chr., ed. (2010). German Hyperinflation 1922/23: A Law and Economics Approach. Eul-Verlag Köln. ISBN 978-3-89936-931-1.
- Friedrich, Carl Joachim (June 1928). "The Issue of Judicial Review in Germany". Political Science Quarterly. 43 (2): 188–200. doi:10.2307/2143300. JSTOR 2143300.
- Guttmann, William. The Great Inflation. Saxon House (1975 hardback w/ sources; ISBN 978-0347000178) or Gordon & Cremonesi Ltd. Publ., London (1976 paperback w/o sources; ISBN 0-86033-035-4). Germany currency hyperinflation 1919–1923.
- When Money Buys Little – Jerry Jensen Study of the 1923 German postage stamps
- Karsten Laursen and Jorgen Pedersen, The German Inflation, North-Holland Publishing Co., Amsterdam, 1964.
- Marks, Sally (September 1978). "The Myths of Reparations". Central European History. 11 (3). Cambridge University Press: 231–255. doi:10.1017/s0008938900018707. JSTOR 4545835. S2CID 144072556.
- Marks, Sally (2003). The Illusion of Peace. New York: Palgrave Macmillan.
- Parsson, Jens O. (1974). Dying of Money : Lessons of the Great German and American Inflations. Boston: Wellspring Press.
- Shapiro, Max (1980). The penniless billionaires. New York: Times Books. ISBN 0-8129-0923-2.
- Tampke, Jürgen (2017). A Perfidious Distortion of History: the Versailles peace treaty and the success of the Nazis. Melbourne: Scribe. ISBN 978-192532-1-944.
- Widdig, Bernd (2001). Culture and inflation in Weimar Germany ([Online-Ausg.] ed.). Berkeley: University of California Press. ISBN 0-520-22290-3.
