= When Money Dies =

1923 Hyperinflation in Germany book by Adam Fergusson

When Money Dies: The Nightmare of Deficit Spending, Devaluation, and Hyperinflation in Weimar Germany
- Author: Adam Fergusson
- Language: English
- Subject: Hyperinflation in the Weimar Republic
- Publisher: W. Kimber (original), PublicAffairs (2010 reissue)
- Publication date: 1975
- Publication place: United Kingdom
- Media type: Print
- Pages: 269
- ISBN: 9781586489946 (2010 edition)
- Dewey Decimal: 943.085
- LC Class: HB311 .F37 2010

When Money Dies: The Nightmare of Deficit Spending, Devaluation, and Hyperinflation in Weimar Germany is a 1975 book by British journalist, historian, and politician Adam Fergusson, describing the hyperinflation in the Weimar Republic of the early 1920s, and in particular the final collapse of the Papiermark in 1923. Originally published by W. Kimber, the book was reissued in 2010 by PublicAffairs and received renewed interest following the 2008 financial crisis.

== Summary ==
The book traces the decline of the German mark (1871), abandonment of the Gold standard in 1914 with the outbreak of WWI. In the aftermath of WWI, in accordance with the Treaty of Versailles, the German Weimar Republic had to pay large World War I reparations, leading to desperate domestic policies deficit financing, and unchecked monetary expansion led to the collapse of the (post November Revolution now paper) German mark, the introduction of the Rentenmark as emergency money (Notgeld), and the subsequent breakdown of everyday life.

Fergusson uses diaries, reports, and contemporary accounts to illustrate how inflation wiped out savings, destabilized civil society, and contributed to the erosion of social norms. He presents inflation not just as an economic phenomenon but as a moral and political one, highlighting how trust in institutions, currency, and fellow citizens deteriorated alongside the currency's value.

== Reception ==
The book was praised for its accessibility and storytelling, When Money Dies has been cited in discussions of monetary policy as a cautionary tale about the long-term consequences of fiscal indiscipline and the fragility of fiat currencies.
