= KEMA Toren =

Coordinates: 51°59′10.78″N 5°52′33.36″E

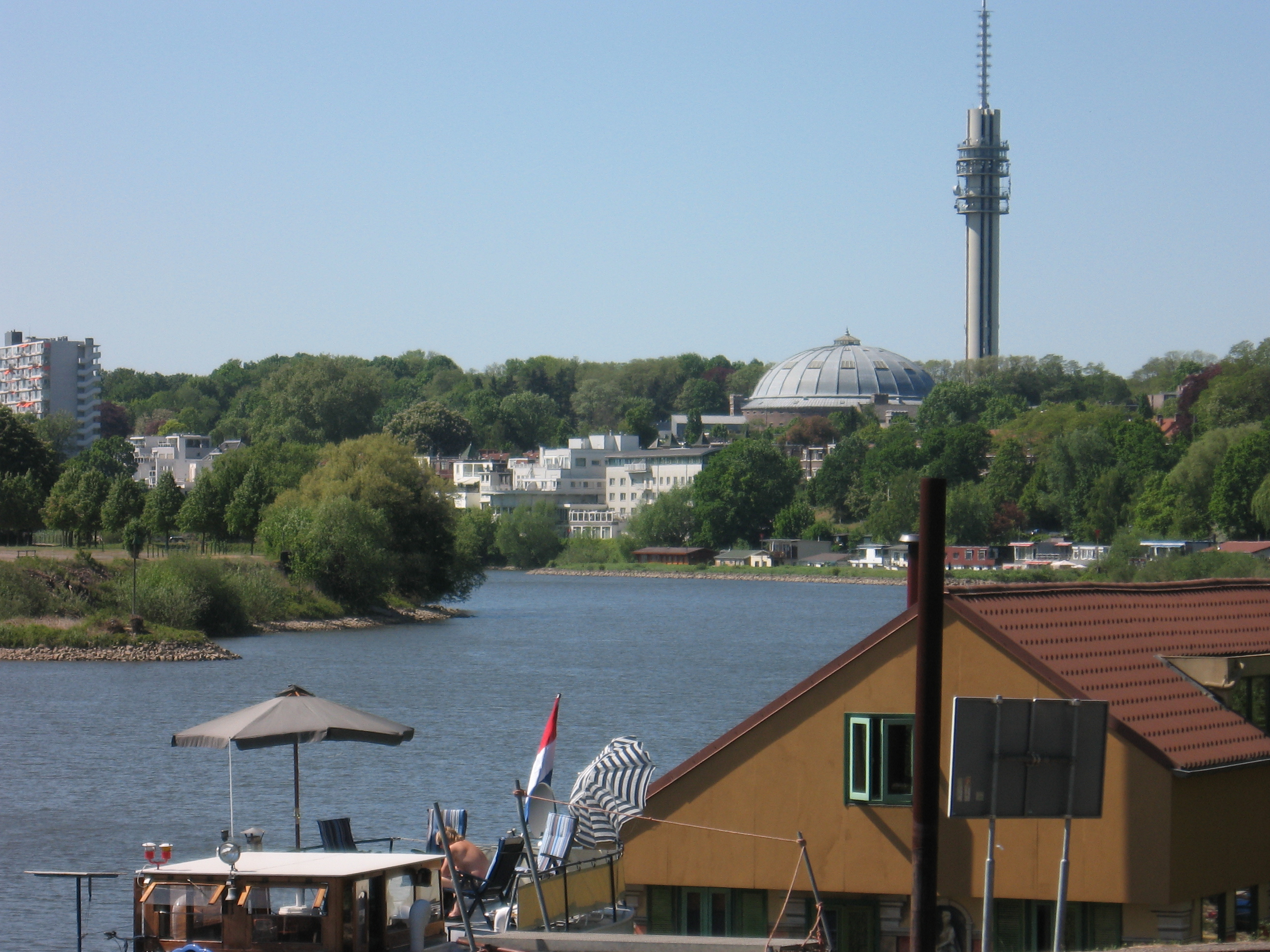
The KEMA Toren viewed across the Rhine

KEMA Toren is a 149-metre (489 ft) broadcasting tower built of reinforced concrete at Arnhem, Netherlands. It was built in 1969 by KEMA for communicating between high voltage substations throughout the Netherlands. It is now used for public radio and TV broadcasting. It is also known as TenneT Toren, after TenneT, the present owner of the tower.

== See also ==
- List of towers
