= Anton Fehr =

German dairy scientist and politician (1881–1954)

Reich Minister for Food and Agriculture
- In office 31 March 1922 – 21 November 1922
- President: Friedrich Ebert
- Chancellor: Joseph Wirth
- Preceded by: Andreas Hermes
- Succeeded by: Karl Müller

Member of the Reichstag for Upper Bavaria–Swabia
- In office 6 June 1920 – 5 March 1933

Bavarian State Minister for Agriculture
- In office 27 June 1924 – July 1930
- Prime Minister: Heinrich Held

Personal details
- Born: 24 December 1881 Lindenberg im Allgäu, Kingdom of Bavaria, German Empire
- Died: 2 April 1954 (aged 72) Lindenberg im Allgäu, Bavaria, West Germany
- Party: BB (1920–1933)

Anton Fehr (24 December 1881 – 2 April 1954) was a German politician and dairy scientist of the Bavarian Peasants' League (BB) and the Reich Minister for Food and Agriculture in 1922.

Fehr was born in Lindenberg im Allgäu, a city he lived in until the end of his life. After attending the agriculture school of Akademie Weihenstephan he attended the TUM School of Life Sciences. Upon completing his education, he became a dairy inspector and then a professor and teacher at his alma mater of TUM. He eventually entered the Reichstag in 1920 for Upper Bavaria–Swabia, where he stayed until 1933, where he created the Reich Milk Act (1930) and helped create an electoral alliance with the Economic Party of the German Middle Class as one of the top members of the BB. He was eventually appointed Reich Minister for Food and Agriculture in 1922 in Joseph Wirth's cabinet. He primarily dealt with a grain levy, which resulted in protests, and was the go-to person for Bavarian affairs after anger in Bavaria from the emergency decree enacted after Walther Rathenau's assassination, helping create the "Berlin Protocol" to appease them.

In 1924 he then became Bavarian State Minister for Agriculture, a position he kept until 1930 when he resigned because of a schlachtsteuer (slaughter tax). He helped expand of dairy schools in the region, dealt with the reconstruction of Bavarian animal breeding after World War One, and promoted hop cultivation. Eventually, in 1935, he was forced to resign from all his positions because of Der Stürmer on accusations of bribery stemming from a 1929 case. It was not until the 20 July plot that he received attention again, when he was arrested on accusations of being part of Franz Sperr's circle, a resistance group of Bavarian monarchists, and was held in Ravensbrück concentration camp until the end of the war. Afterwards, he was allowed to return to his professorship and became the first Head of the Association of the German Dairy Industry, but died soon after in 1954.

Fehr was generally considered a right-wing, conservative member of the Bavarian Peasants' League for most of his career, which led him to draw close to the NSDAP although he never fully joined and generally retired from politics after his defeat in 1933. He was considered a pioneer of the German dairy industry and helped to secure the dairy industry in the German economy. Fehr played a major part in growing the industry during a collapse and subsequent decline.

== Early life ==
Anton Fehr was born on 24 December 1881 in Lindenberg im Allgäu, which was located in the Kingdom of Bavaria in the German Empire. His father, Josef (1843–1923), was a hat manufacturer for the Bürgermeister, presumably of the town of Lindenberg im Allgäu. His mother, Walburga (née Kink; 1856–1884), was the daughter of a landowner (Gutsbesitzer) in Harbatshofen (a former village now incorporated into Stiefenhofen). He first attended the Carl-von-Linde-Gymnasium Kempten located in Kempten. After graduating with his abitur he did the second education pathway, doing an agricultural internship on estates with dairies in Ottobeuren and Kühbach and then attending school. The school he attended was Akademie Weihenstephan, an academy for agriculture, and afterwards attended the agricultural department of the Technical University of Munich. At Munich he joined the student fraternity, Corps Suevo-Guestphalia.

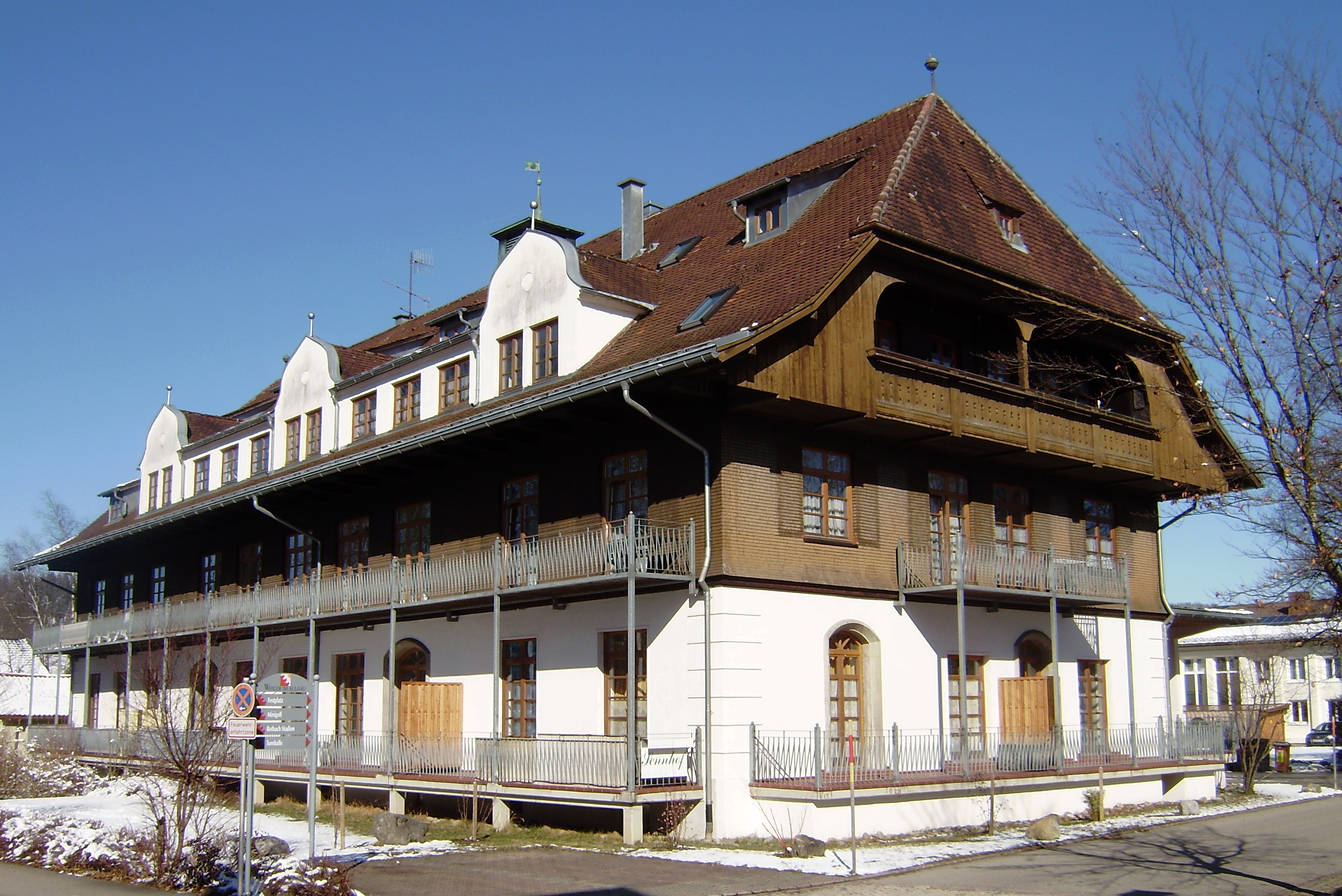
The Dr. Anton Fehr School, a school building originally for emmental cheese production but was named after him for his work in dairy science, that existed until 1970.

In 1904 he was appointed a scientific assistant at the Weihenstephan Institute of Dairy Economics. In 1905 he became a traveling teacher of the Dairy Association, in which time he passed his exams to become an agricultural teacher in 1906 with an A. In 1907 he became a district dairy inspector for the government of Upper Bavaria, a position he would keep until 1917. In 1917 he was appointed professor of dairy science at TUM School of Life Sciences. In addition, during the midst of World War One, he was appointed head of the Bavarian State Fat Office in Munich, which he did until 1922. In 1921 he also became President of the Bavarian Dairy Association.

== Political career ==
=== Reichstag ===
In the 1920 German federal election, he was elected to the Reichstag for Upper Bavaria–Swabia, representing the Bavarian Peasants' League which he had joined not too long before. He was given seat 452, the only other representative of the party alongside Georg Eisenberger. The vast majority of his actions during his time in parliament dealt with agriculture.

He was not allowed to speak for most of his early years in parliament besides declaring that there shouldn't be uniform salaries for civil servants across Germany, saying it was a serious interference in self-government. Fehr helped organize in the Reichstag an electoral alliance between his party and the Economic Party of the German Middle Class for the 1924 elections. He interfered in parliament in 1927 on the topic of tariff protection for agricultural products, citing his knowledge of tariffs on dairy products. Another action he did was draft a Hops origin law to designate where hops should originate in 1929. He helped create the Reich Milk Act in 1930 which presented a dairy industry work program during the Great Depression, because the milk market had collapsed due to foreign competition.

Fehr was generally considered part of the right-wing, conservative fraction of the Bavarian Peasants' League for most of his time until the end of the Weimar Republic when he drew closer to the NSDAP. After the dissolution of his party in April 1933, he became an intern of NSDAP but lost his mandate later that year.

=== Reich Minister for Food and Agriculture ===
On 31 March 1922, he was appointed Reich Minister for Food and Agriculture in Joseph Wirth's cabinet. He succeeded Andreas Hermes.

He faced difficulties soon after from farmers threatened to take measures after compulsory delivery of grain at low prices, the grain levy, was maintained due to the rise of inflation, he eventually compromised by staying with the levy but with some adjustments which he justified because of the production cost of grain. He also severely regulated the usage of sugar during this time due to a nationwide shortage of the product. After the assassination of Foreign Minister Walther Rathenau, he expressed approval of a measure that repealed the emergency decree to protect the Republic in Bavaria and allow reviews to go to Bavarian courts. He repeatedly reported on the mood in Bavaria over the law, which he generally described as very negative, stirring up Bavarian sovergenity. However, the matter became political and he suggested negotiations, and he created the "Berlin Protocol" in August 1922 that accommodated Bavaria in courts. Then, in September 1922, he declared that there would be a mass food shortage, but worried that a monarchist or communist uprising would occur as a result.

After Wirth resigned as chancellor because the SPD withdrew from his chancellor, a new government was formed and Fehr was asked to continue but declined because he did not agree with the policies of the new cabinet. He officially resigned on 21 November 1922, and was succeeded by Karl Müller.

=== Bavarian State Minister for Agriculture ===
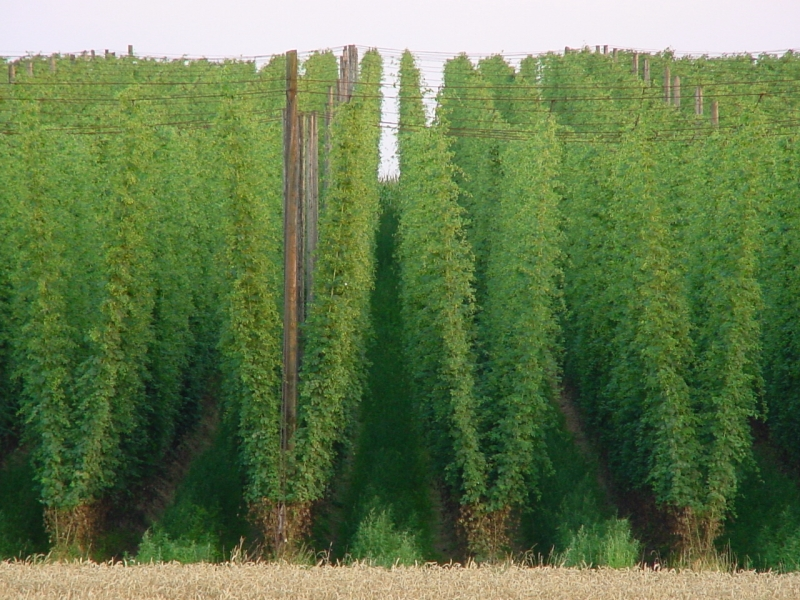
A picture of mature hops in a yard. A notable focus of his administration was on hops in response to an outbreak of disease.

On 27 June 1924, two years after being Reich Minister, he was appointed Bavarian State Minister for Agriculture in Heinrich Held's cabinet.

A main problem he had to deal with during this role was how understaffed the ministry was, with only 50 officials working at the time he was appointed. Fehr helped promote schooling and research in agriculture, considering he thought of himself as a product of these same programs. In particular, he focused on the expansion of schooling of dairy schools and the reconstruction of Bavarian animal breeding. He promoted grassland dairy farming, instead of arable farming, which he did by promoting branded dairy products from the region. New facilities for hop cultivation were created in 1927, after they were destroyed by disease, and a society was founded for hop research. It was widely expected he would resign in 1928 as a result of his party having their coalition friendship with the German nationalists terminated, however he continued as minister.

He withdrew from the government after the Reich government introduced a schlachtsteuer (slaughter tax) to balance the state budget, a position his party and Fehr himself decried. He resigned in July 1930, and Karl Stützel became the acting minister on 25 July 1930.

=== Later career ===
After resigning, he became President of the South German Research Institute for Dairy Industry. In addition, in 1931, he became Chairman of the German Dairy Industry Association, but in 1933 he resigned from TUM which is presumed to be involuntary.

==== Persecution by Nazis ====
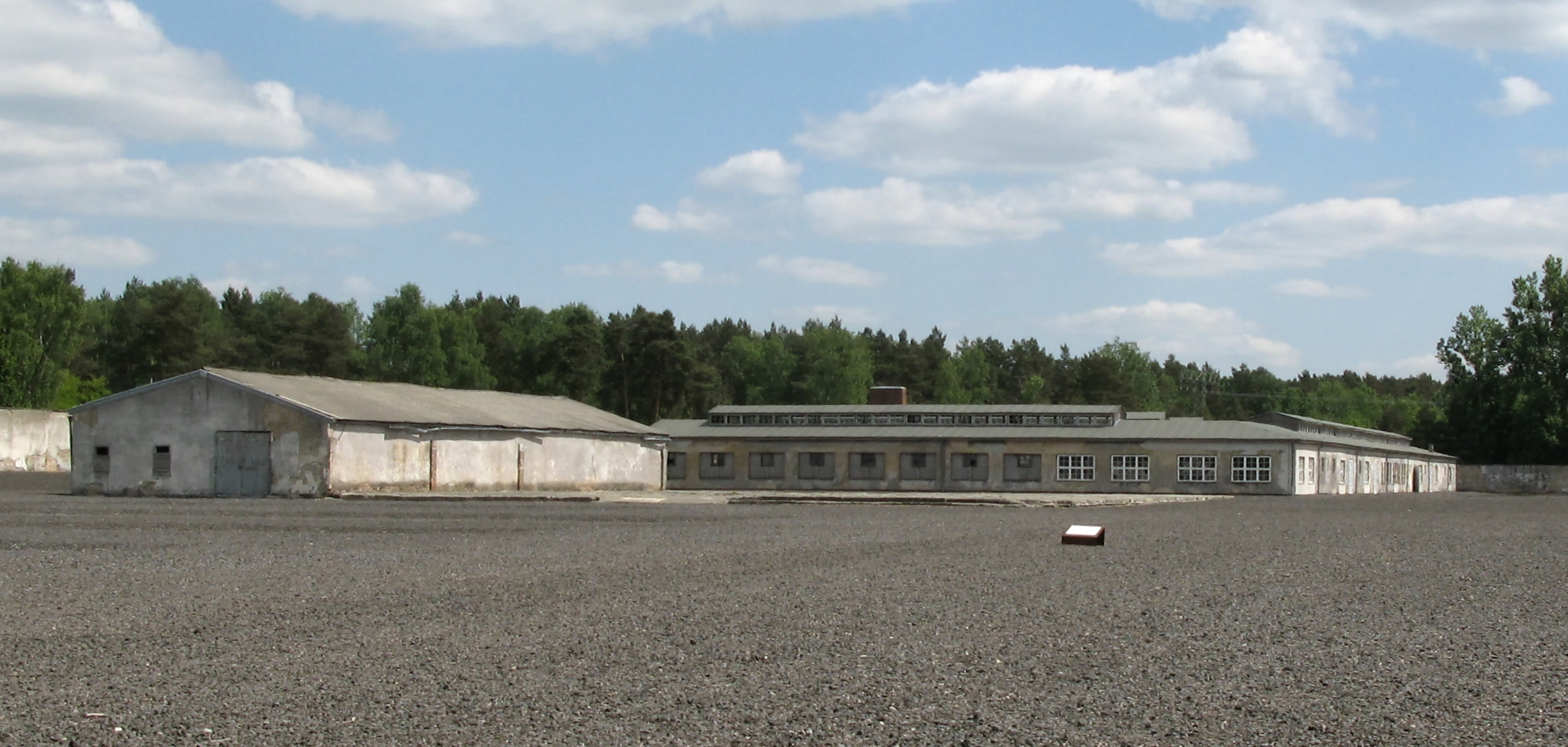
Fehr was imprisoned at Ravensbrück concentration camp, pictured here, from 1944 to 1945 after his alleged involvement in the 20 July plot for his alleged involvement with Franz Sperr's circle of Bavarian monarchists.

In 1935, in a special issue of the anti-Semitic tabloid newspaper Der Stürmer, he was accused of again taking bribes in his time as Reich Minister. This stemmed from a case in 1929 where Fehr had reportedly taken bribes from August Bauernfreund, including unpaid packages of sausage due to hyperinflation, and having continued interest in board he supervised on during his time as Reich Minister. Wilhelm Niklas, who worked with Fehr, was also accused of taking these bribes but later on when Bauernfreund was accused of irregularities, paid an amount and asking for disciplinary proceedings. All these accusations came from Julius Streicher, who dragged it on and so in 1929 Fehr filed a motion to prosecute Streicher, and the court decision concluded in 1931. A settlement was agreed to: Streicher and his editor Karl Holz stated they did not want to claim that Fehr and Niklas had committed bribery.

He was removed from his position as a professor of dairy farming because of his proximity and affiliation with the Weimar Republic parties. He was also forced to retire on 31 March 1936 as the Chairman of the German Dairy Association. In a letter soon after in October 1935 from Gauleiter Adolf Wagner to Rudolf Hess, Wagner declared Fehr's expulsion from his position as an "injustice". A few years later, two days after the 20 July plot, he was arrested together with Otto Gessler and Andreas Hermes. Fehr was accused of having contact with Franz Sperr's circle, a resistance group of Bavarian monarchists. He was taken to Ravensbrück concentration camp. He did not have a trial before the People's Court.

In July 1949, during Denazification, a committee for Lindau led by Otto Biehl declared him unencumbered (having no ties to the Nazi regime). They found that he was a member of the NSV, but was not a member of the NSDAP and only a nominal member of the NSV and was declared not active and belonging to those groups.

==== After the war ====
After the war, he was involved in the reconstruction of the Bavarian dairy industry as a commissioner. He also once again headed the Weihenstephan Research and Research Institute, and also became the chairman of the Allgäu Dairy Association and the Allgäu Herdbook Society. Fehr was also the chairman of the national Association of the German Dairy Industry upon its founding in 1951, which promoted cooperations between dairy industry groups and promoting scientific research.

== Personal life ==
In 1907, at the age of 25, he married the 18-year-old Elisabeth Gerhardt, the daughter of a forester named Wilhelm. They had four children - three sons, and one daughter. However, only two sons survived the Second World War. He was Roman Catholic, and his permanent address was Lindenlohe 18 in Lindenberg im Allgäu. Otto Gessler, another minister who was also arrested with him, described him as a neighbor and a friend for decades.

=== Death ===
He died on 2 April 1954 in his hometown of Lindenberg im Allgäu at the age of 72. He was posthumously called the König des Allgäus (King of Allgäu), likely due to his impact on the town.

== Honours and awards ==
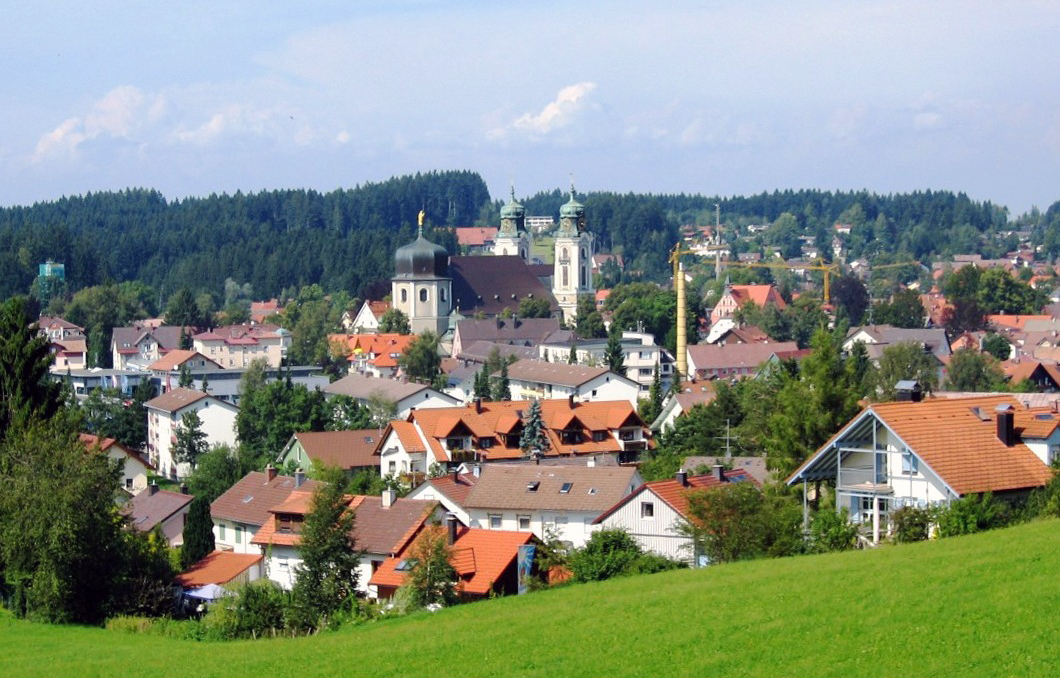
Fehr lived the majority of his life in Lindenberg im Allgäu, which earned him the honorary nickname König des Allgäus (King of Allgäu) and he was awarded with honorary citizenship.

A medal was awarded in his honor by the Technical University of Munich. There was also a medal awarded by the German Agricultural Society in his honor to dairy companies that achieved consecutive years of winning results in the DLG dairy performance tests. An Anton Fehr Foundation was also set up in Kempten which was intended to provide support to students that wanted to get into dairy and milk schools.

- Honorary doctorate from the Akademie Weihenstephan (1927)
- Honorary citizen of Lindenberg im Allgäu for "supplying his hometown with essential goods" (10 December 1951)
- Grand Cross of the Order of Merit of the Federal Republic of Germany (1952)
