= Deutscher Bauernverband =

German agriculture and forestry association

- Abbreviation: DBV
- Formation: 1948
- Legal status: Eingetragener Verein
- Headquarters: Berlin
- Official language: German
- Key people: Joachim Rukwied (Präsident), Stefanie Sabet (Generalsekretär)
- Website: https://www.bauernverband.de/

The Deutscher Bauernverband (DBV - German Farmers' Association) is the largest agricultural and forestry professional association in the Federal Republic of Germany. The DBV is the most significant interest group, lobbying and professional association of farmers in Germany.

It is the umbrella organization of 18 regional farmers' associations. More than 90% of all German agricultural operations (about 270.000, 380.000 farmers) are members of DBV. Besides its headquarters in Berlin, the DBV also runs an office in Brussels. The DBV represents conventional and ecological farming. However, the political focus is on conventional agriculture. Organic farmers are organized in the Bund Ökologische Lebensmittelwirtschaft (BÖLW) and small and medium-size farmers in the more progressive Arbeitsgemeinschaft bäuerliche Landwirtschaft (German Working Group for Peasant Agriculture).

== Politics ==
Lobbying is of great importance for German farmers because of high agricultural subsidies. In Germany, the Federal Ministry of Finance is providing subsidies (tax breaks and financial aid) of around 2.65 billion euros for the 2023 budget.

According to the farmers' association, 69% of the EU CAP spending of 58.3 billion euros in 2023 is going to conditional direct payments, with only 5% to agricultural market spending and 26% to the general development of rural areas. At the European level, every EU citizen pays 25 cents a day for EU agricultural policy.

German agriculture contributes around 65 million tons of carbon dioxide equivalents to 7.5 percent of total emissions according to WWF. If the emissions caused by the drainage of moors for agricultural use, the degradation of grassland, the burning of fossil fuels in agriculture and the production of pesticides and fertilizers are counted, the total quantity of agricultural emissions increases by around 43 million tons, making up 14% of all German emissions.

=== Network and Lobbying ===
Through its representation in relevant Bundestag committees and its influence on political parties, specifically the CDU, the DBV controls the design of agricultural, food and environmental policy in Germany. According to NGO "Lobby Control", the DBV has repeatedly prevented or diluted government initiatives to protect consumers, animals and the environment. According to German Bundestag, beside the DBV board, 35 persons lobbying for the Farmers Association interests are registered at the German Federal parliament in Berlin by 2025.

According to a case study by NABU, the German partner of BirdLife, from 2019, since the turn of the millennium, the DBV has built up its networking structures and the overall options for industrial agriculture have been strengthened.

The DBV network covers many areas of agricultural policy and agribusiness.

Overall, a relatively small group of DBV actors in agribusiness and agricultural policy share the key strategic positions. These multi- or multiple-position holders primarily come from the top ranks of the German Farmers' Association and its regional associations.

This inevitably leads to conflicts of interest. The business objectives of the agricultural sector often differ from the interests of farmers.

=== Right secession "Land schafft Verbindung" ===
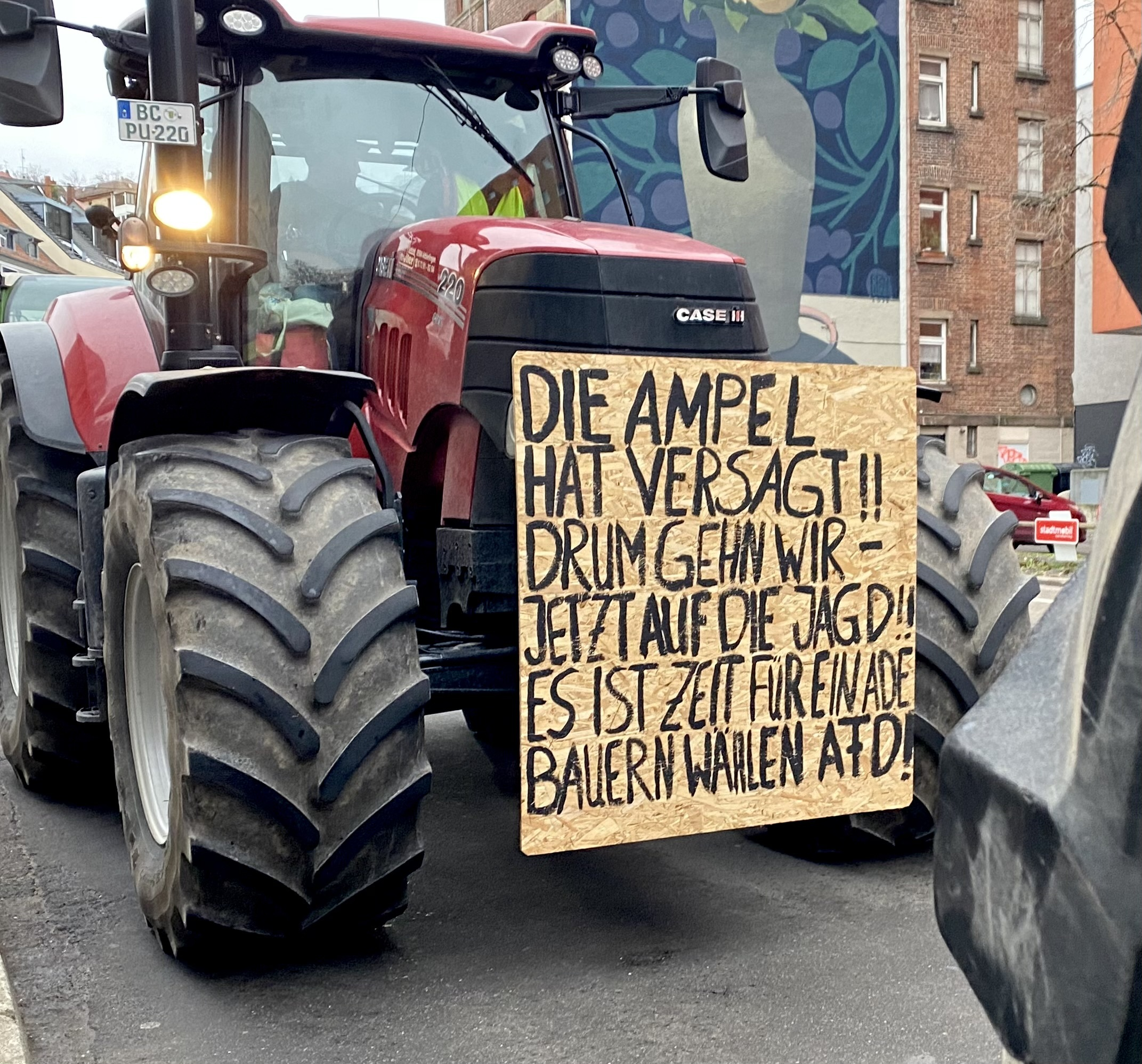
"Land creates connection – Germany" protest in Stuttgart 2023. The sign on the Tractor form district Biberach calls for the election of the far-right Alternative for Germany

In 2020, politically right-wing farmers gathered in a Facebook group. This gave rise to the "Land Creates Connection" movement as a secession of the DBV. At the end of 2019, two associations were split and subsequently founded "Land Creates Connection – The Original", led by Maike Schulz-Broers and Klaus-Peter Weinand, and "Land Creates Connection – Germany", led by Dirk Andresen and Sebastian Dickow (until March 2020). From its founding until June 2024, the AfD-affiliated influencer Anthony R. Lee acted as the organization's spokesperson.

Certain members of the group threatened politicians with violence, and on social media, they took part in inciting nation-wide farmers' protests in December 2023. In some cases, there were calls for the elected government to be removed by force.

== Financing ==
The DBV is financed primarily through membership fees from the state farmers' associations. In addition, there are project-related grants and revenues, as well as rental and interest income. According to the Bundestag's lobby register, the German Farmers' Association and its sub-organizations received at least 1.7 million euros from public funds in 2023.

The CSU government of Bavaria granted the Bavarian Farmers' Association the status of a public corporation, representing the entire agricultural sector and being consulted on all important issues affecting the industry. The Bavarian Ministry of Agriculture reimbursed the organization for approximately €1.5 million in 2023.

== Other Farmers Association ==
=== Arbeitsgemeinschaft bäuerliche Landwirtschaft e.V. ===
The German Working Group for Peasant Agriculture (AbL) was founded in 1980 with the goal of representing the interests of small and medium-sized farms. In its statement on the 2024 EU elections, it states: "We need many and diverse farms and farmers across Europe with their knowledge and skills: for crisis-proof regional food supplies, for vibrant rural areas, for environmental, climate, and animal welfare." The AbL cooperates with the Bundeverband Solidarische Landwirtschaft.

== Precursors and related historical associations ==
- Association of the German Farmers Associations (1900-1934)
- German Farmers' Party (1928-1933)
- Christian-National Peasants' and Farmers' Party (1928-1932)
- Agricultural League (Reichslandbund) (1921-1933)
- Landbund, Austrian political party during the period of the First Republic (1918–1934).
- Reichsnährstand, Nazi organisation (1933-1945)
- Democratic Farmers' Party of Germany, East German political party (1948-1990)

From 1967 to 1979, Constantin Heereman von Zuydtwyck was president of the DBV.

== Memberships ==
- GEFA (German Export Association for Food and Agriproducts)
- COPA-COGECA
- WFO

== See also ==
- German Agricultural Society (DLG)
- Andreas Hermes, first president of the DBV
- Common Agricultural Policy
