= Stephan Huber =

German sculptor and object artist

- Born: 1952 (age 73–74); Lindenberg im Allgäu, Germany
- Occupations: Sculptor and object artist
- Website: http://www.shkunst.de/

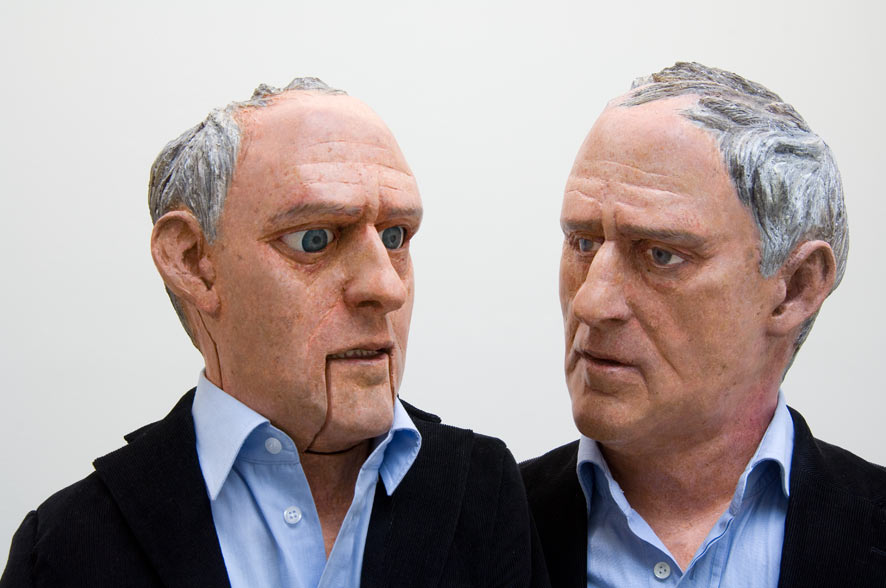
Schattensprecher, 2009, Kunstmuseum Bonn, detail (self-portrait of the artist with ventriloquist's dummy)

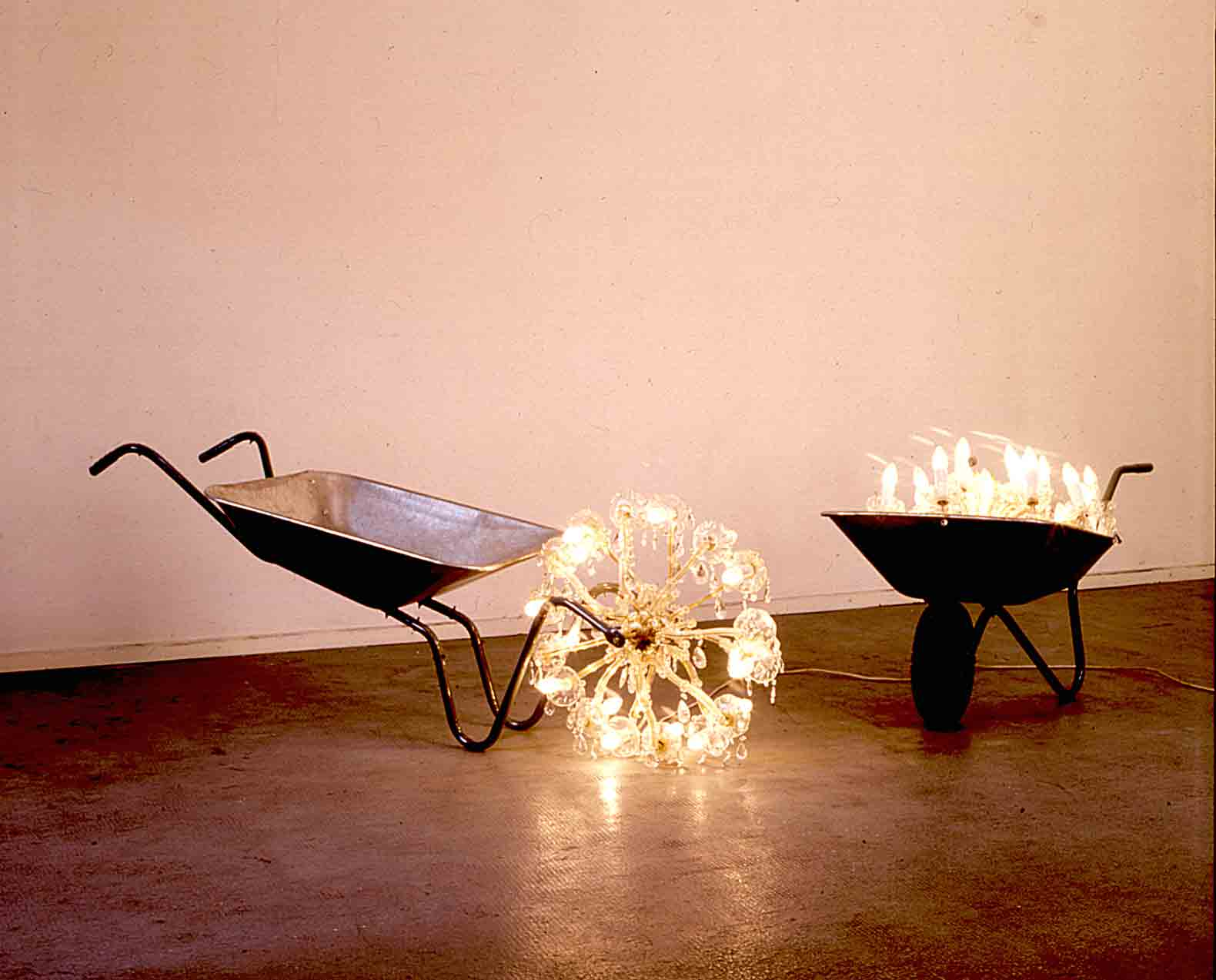
Arbeiten im Reichtum 3 und 7, Hamburger Kunsthalle, 1983

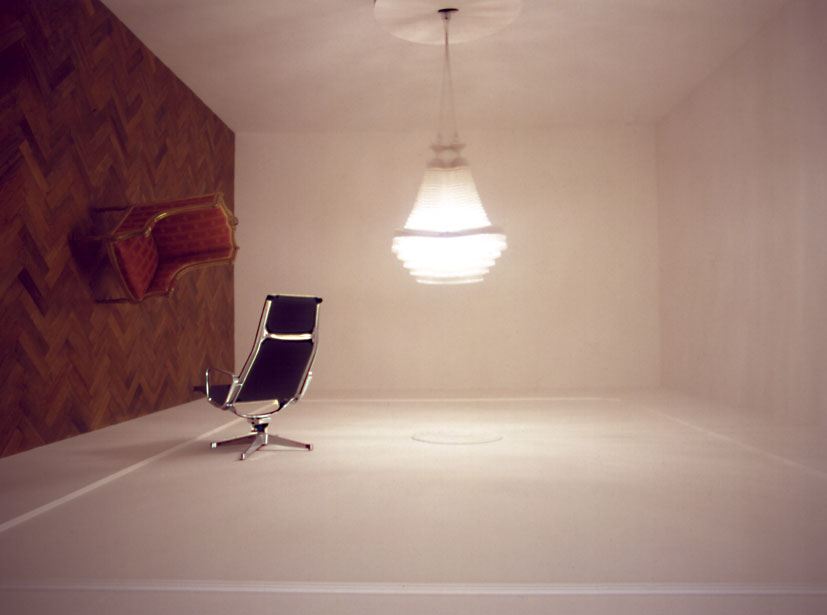
Ich liebe Dich, 1983, Städtische Galerie im Lenbachhaus München (Munich)

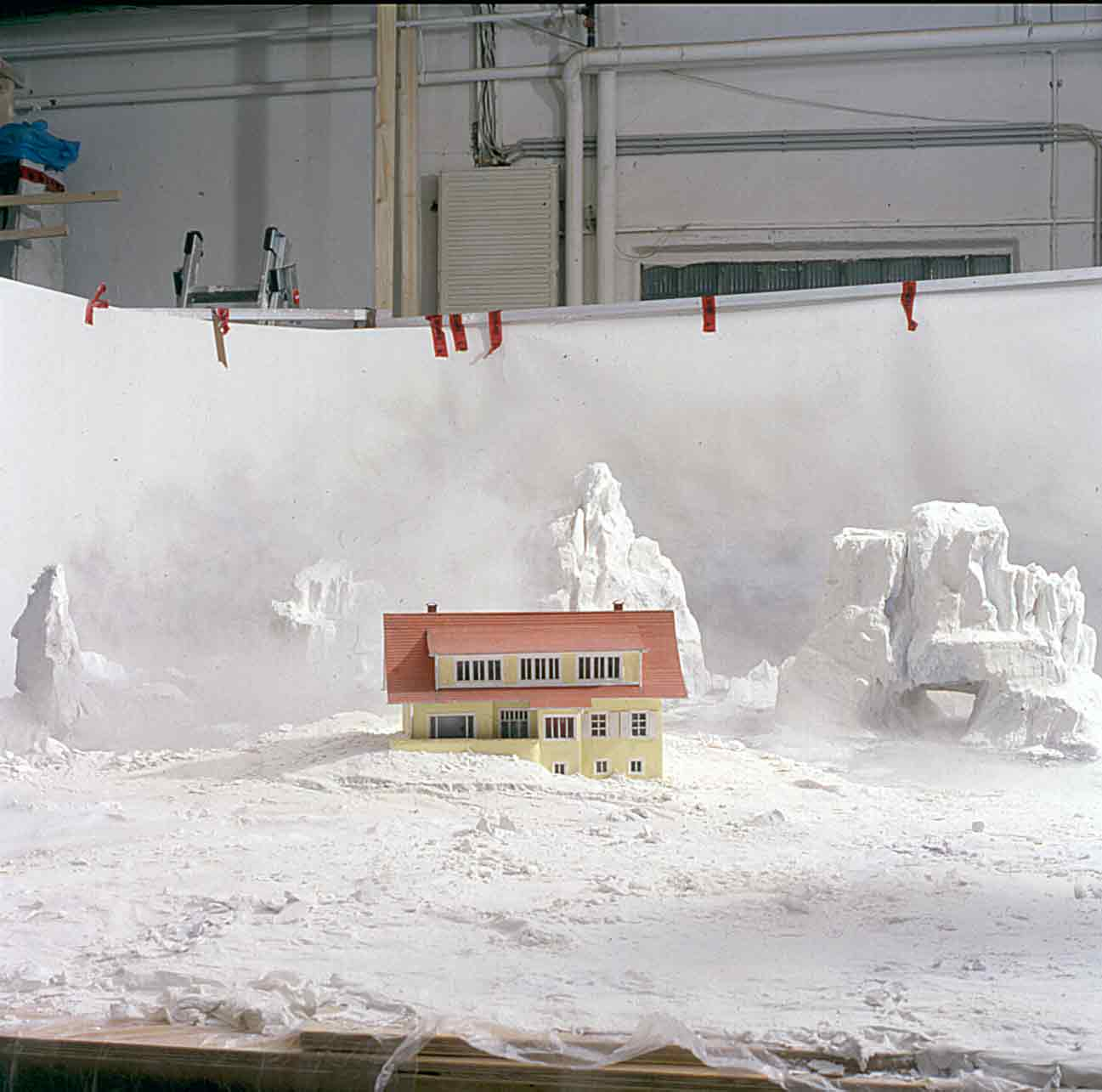
shining, 2004, MUMOK (Museum Moderner Kunst Stiftung Ludwig) Vienna, installation view (model of the artist's childhood house)

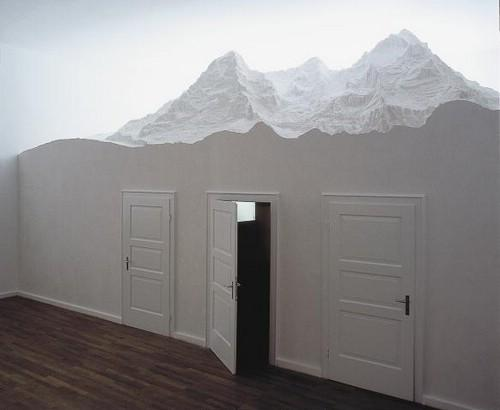
8,5 Zi.Wohnung f.Künstler, 49 J., 2002, Städtische Galerie im Lenbachhaus München (Munich), detail

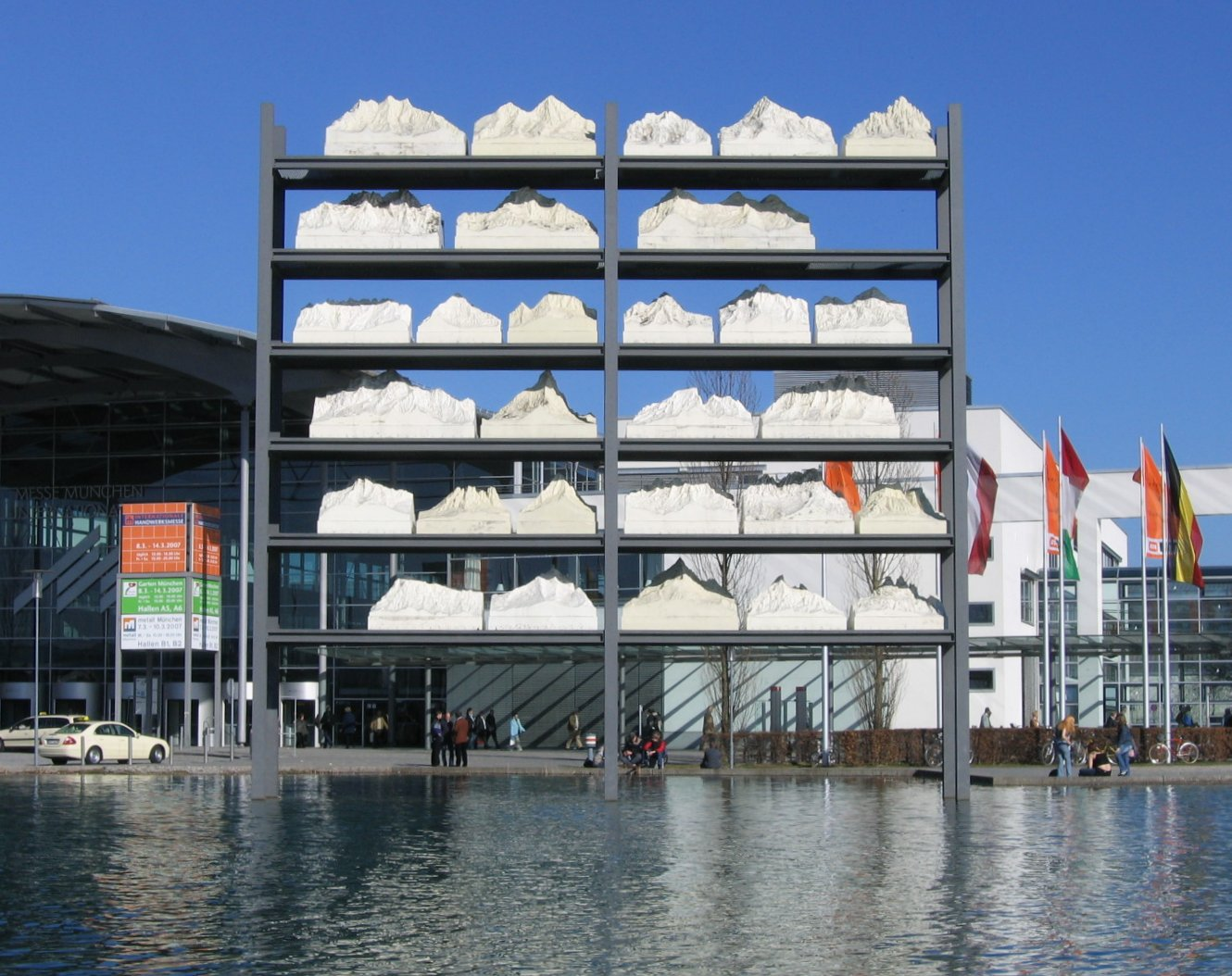
Gran Paradiso, 1997, Neue Messe München (Munich Fare Trade Centre)

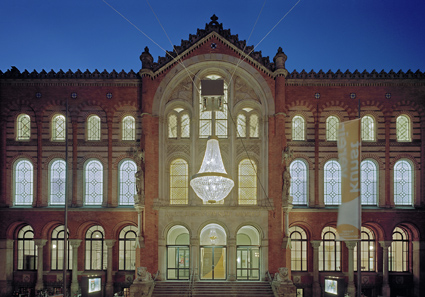
Das Große Leuchten, 2006 (Künstlerhaus Hanover)

Stephan Huber (born 1952) is a German sculptor and object artist.

== Life ==
After his studies at the Academy of Fine Arts, Munich (1971–1978), Huber received a grant for the P.S.1 studio programme in New York (now MoMA PS1). He has since exhibited internationally, including Documenta VIII in 1987 and the Venice Biennale in 1999 as well as numerous one person shows (Kunstverein Hannover, Museum der bildenden Künste Leipzig, Kunsthalle Mannheim, Von-der-Heydt-Museum, Wuppertal, Third Eye Centre Villa Romana, Florence, Bonner Kunstverein, Westfälischer Kunstverein, Lenbachhaus, Munich and others). Since 2004, he has been a professor at the Munich Academy of Fine Arts and a member of the Bavarian Academy of Fine Arts. Huber lives in Munich and in eastern Allgäu.

== Work ==
Huber's oeuvre is characterized by a narrative language that distils the conceptual and experiential world of the artist into striking images with immediate emotional impact. Huber often makes himself the protagonist of his works, thematizing his homeland and childhood as well as giving artistic expression to what he sees, reads, and remembers, and thus delineates the social, geographical, and intellectual horizon within which he moves. The autobiographical references—for example, models of radiantly white mountains, upper middle-class interiors, and his parental home—not only are to be understood as aesthetic psychograms of the artist, but also combine with fictional elements and art-historical, political, or literary references so as to give rise to personally colored but simultaneously universal, archetypal symbols of social or emotional states.

One fundamental aspect of Huber's oeuvre is a deliberate play with disturbing estrangement. "In the tradition of Munich Dadaism", his sculptures and installations work with a transposition of the customary context of objects as well as with unusual perspectives, altered sizes, logical paradoxes, and unexpected occurrences. Reciprocally related individual works are often joined into spatial passages which are meant to be explored in succession, for example, in the exhibition "8,5 Zi.-Whg. f. Künstler, 49 J." ("8½-Room Apt. for Artist, 49 Years Old") at the Lenbachhaus Gallery in Munich. The sometimes emotionally overwhelming aesthetic through which Huber situates himself in the tradition of the Bavarian-Baroque world theatre becomes broken and humanized through a humorous revelation of its mechanisms, an ironic distancing, or an unexpected turn of events.

In addition to space-encompassing installations and works in public spaces, Huber's oeuvre also includes graphic works, films, plays for puppet theatre, and performative projects.

== Awards ==
- 1981 P.S.1 studio grant, New York
- 1984 Working Stipend of the Stiftung Kunstfonds, Bonn
- 1984 Förderpreis für Bildende Kunst der Stadt München (Young Talents Award in Visual Art by the City of Munich)
- 1985 Karl-Hofer-Preis (Karl Hofer Award), Berlin
- 1986 Bayerischer Kunstförderpreis (Bavarian Art Award), Munich, and Kunstpreis Glockengasse, Cologne
- 1999 W.-Krafft-Preis (W. Krafft Award), Stuttgart
- 2007 Rolandpreis für Kunst im öffentlichen Raum (Roland Award for Public Art), Bremen
- 2008 Kunstpreis der Stadt München (City of Munich Art Prize)
- 2024 Bezirk Schwaben (Swabian District Art Prize)

== Works in public spaces (selection) ==
- 2011 Design of the subway station Wien-Aspern in Vienna (completion at the end of 2012)
- 2010 Drei Kasperlstücke für das Ruhrgebiet (Three Punch-Plays for the Ruhr Region), puppet theater at public sites in the Ruhr region for the exhibition Emscherkunst.2010, Essen
- 2010 In und um und um herum, light-box installation, Universitätsklinikum Ulm
- 2010 Raining Hat, fountain sculpture, Landesgartenschau Rosenheim
- 2008–2010 Arbeiten im Reichtum 2, series of actions in public spaces, Bremen
- 2007 Cumulus:Cambodunum, fountain sculpture in front of Stadttheater Kempten
- 2006 Das große Leuchten, exterior installation in front of Künstlerhaus Hannover
- 2006 Großes Lob des binären Systems, Leibniz-Rechenzentrum, Garching bei München
- 2005 Katastrophen und Rettung, Versicherungskammer Bayern, Munich
- 2005 Library at Arp Museum Bahnhof Rolandseck, Remagen
- 2004 Stiftermosaik (Mosaic of Sponsors), Museum der bildenden Künste Leipzig
- 2002 Zwei Pferde für Münster, LVM Versicherungen, Münster (Westphalia)
- 2002 Im Fluß, Allianz-Versicherung, Frankfurt am Main
- 1999 Frankfurter Treppe / XX. Jahrhundert, Main Tower, Frankfurt am Main
- 1998 Grünes Dach, HUK-Coburg-Versicherung, Coburg
- 1998 Dächer, Hamburg-Mannheimer Versicherung, Hamburg
- 1997 Gran Paradiso, New Munich Trade Fair Center
- 1994 Hauptbahnhof Nord, installation in the subway station Hauptbahnhof Nord, Hamburg (with Raimund Kummer)
- 1992 Die Alpen, fountain, Munich Airport
- 1989 Meinwärts (Else Lasker-Schüler memorial), Wuppertal
- 1987 Rote Sonnen, four mosaics, Kokerei Zollverein, Essen

== Exhibitions (selection) ==
- 2011 Graz, Kunsthaus: Die Vermessung der Welt. Heterotopien und Wissensräume in der Kunst
- 2010 Ulm, Kunstverein: from the bergs 2 (solo exhibition)
- 2010 Århus, ARoS: I LOVE YOU
- 2010 Potsdam, Villa Schöningen: 1989
- 2010 Essen, Emscherkunst.2010
- 2009 Bonn, Kunstmuseum: Reloaded
- 2009 Vienna, Kunsthalle: 1989. Ende der Geschichte oder Beginn der Zukunft
- 2009 Hamburg, Kunsthalle: MAN SON 1969. Vom Schrecken der Situation
- 2008 Saragossa, Expo 2008: El mundo del hielo
- 2006 Karlsruhe, ZKM: Lichtkunst aus Kunstlicht
- 2006 Vienna, Museum Moderner Kunst Stiftung Ludwig Wien (MUMOK): Why pictures now
- 2006 Bolzano, Messner Mountain Museum: In die Berge schreien
- 2006 Leipzig, Museum der bildenden Künste: Ballkünstler
- 2005 Munich, Kubus im Petuelpark: Kalte Kammer (solo exhibition)
- 2005 Metz, FRAC Lorraine: Quand les latitudes deviennent suisses
- 2005 Berlin, Palast der Republik: Fraktale 04
- 2003 Essen, Museum Folkwang: Klopfzeichen – Wahnzimmer
- 2003 Bremen, Städtische Galerie: NO CITY – NO ART
- 2003 Hanover, Kunstverein: Die Lust des Kartographen
- 2002 Munich, Lenbachhaus: 8,5 Zi.-Whg. f. Künstler, 49 J. (solo exhibition)
- 2002 Heidelberg, Kunstverein: Der Berg
- 2002 Bolzano, Museion: Stanze II
- 2001 Hanover, Kunstverein: 7,5 Zi.-Whg. f. Künstler, 49 J. (solo exhibition)
- 2001 Leipzig, Museum der bildenden Künste: 8-Zi.-Whg. f. Künstler, 49 J. (solo exhibition)
- 2000 Kiel, Kunsthalle, and Leipzig, Museum der bildenden Künste: Desert and Transit
- 1999 Venice, Biennale di Venezia: d’APERTutto
- 1999 Munich, Lenbachhaus: Das Gedächtnis öffnet seine Tore
- 1998 Naples, Pompeiorum Villa Comunale
- 1998 Hamburg, Kunstverein: Fast forward
- 1997 Vienna, Kunsthalle: Alpenblick
- 1995 Ghent, Museum Dhondt-Dhaenens: Leo Copers, Stephan Huber
- 1994 Mannheim, Kunsthalle: Bauplatz (solo exhibition)
- 1994 Munich, Haus der Kunst: Scharf im Schauen
- 1993 Wuppertal, Von-der-Heydt-Museum: Nordwand Südkreuz (solo exhibition)
- 1993 Munich, Kunstverein: Die Arena des Privaten
- 1991 Antwerp, Museum van Hedendaagse Kunst: Naackte Schoonheid
- 1991 Bonn, Kunstverein: Projekt Magnetbahn
- 1991 Stuttgart, Württembergischer Kunstverein: Das goldene Zeitalter
- 1990 Munich, Lenbachhaus: Bild für Bild
- 1989 Belgrade, Museum für zeitgenössische Kunst: Neue deutsche Kunst
- 1989 Bonn, Kunstverein: Die Gegenwart der vergangenen Zeit
- 1989 Antwerp, Museum van Hedendaagse Kunst: Beyond the Everyday Object
- 1988 Frankfurt am Main, Kunstverein: Die große Oper
- 1988 Hamburg, Kunsthaus and Kunstverein: Arbeit in Geschichte. Geschichte in Arbeit
- 1987 Kassel, Fridericianum: Documenta 8
- 1987 Glasgow, Third Eye Centre (solo exhibition)
- 1987 Bonn, Kunstverein: Wechselströme
- 1987 Essen, Museum Folkwang: Kunst im öffentlichen Raum
- 1987 Graz, Neue Galerie: steirischer herbst / trigon
- 1987 Bonn, Kunstverein: Die große Oper
- 1986 Florence, Salone Villa Romana (solo exhibition)
- 1986 Munich, Kunstraum: Rote Sonnen (solo exhibition)
- 1986 Hamburg, Kunstverein: Raum für Raum
- 1985 Bern, Kunsthalle: Alles und noch viel mehr
- 1985 Berlin, Nationalgalerie: Deutsche Kunst 1945–1985
- 1984 Bonn, Kunstverein: Das Spielzimmer (solo exhibition)
- 1984 Berlin, NGBK / Künstlerhaus Bethanien: Wer überlebt, winkt
- 1984 Cologne, Kunstverein: Kunstlandschaft Bundesrepublik
- 1982 Münster, Westfälischer Kunstverein: Das Gottesreich fliegt: der Kunstverein tanzt (solo exhibition)
- 1983 Munich, Lenbachhaus: Aktuell 83
- 1983 Bonn, Kunstverein: Aspekte kritischer Kunst
- 1981 Munich, Lenbachhaus: Fliegen & Ratten (solo exhibition)
- 1980 Munich, Kunstforum: Das Mehl (solo exhibition)
- 1980 New York, P.S.1, Institute for Art and Urban Resources

== Exhibition catalogues and similar publications (chronological) ==
- Stephan Huber, Das Gottesreich fliegt – der Kunstverein tanzt, exhib. cat. Westfälischer Kunstverein Münster 1982, with text by Thomas Deecke
- Stephan Huber, Lager im Kopf, 1983, Verlag Hubert Kretschmer, Munich
- Stephan Huber, exhib. cat. Bonner Kunstverein, 1984, with texts by Margarethe Jochimsen, Helmut Friedel, Stephan Huber, Michael Schwarz, Thomas Deecke, Hermann Pitz
- Das Engadinprojekt, 1987, Künstlerhaus Bethanien, Berlin, with an interview between Stephan Huber and Uwe M. Schneede
- Thomas Dreher: Huber. Zeichen-Körper Artefactum, Nr.20/September–October 1987, S.24-29 (In German), p. 66 (Summary in English)
- Stephan Huber, 1989, Künstler, Kritisches Lexikon der Gegenwartskunst, text by Stephan Schmidt-Wulffen
- Stephan Huber, Raimund Kummer, 1991, exhib. cat. Hamburger Kunsthalle, with texts by Monika Steinhausen, Uwe M. Schneede, Armin Zweite, Thomas Deecke, Margarethe Jochimsen, Helmut Friedel et al.
- Stephan Huber, Nordwand Südkreuz, 1993, exhib. cat. Von der Heydt-Museum Wuppertal, with texts by Ludger Derenthal and Stephan Huber
- Stephan Huber, Raimund Kummer, Hauptbahnhof Nord, 1994, Hamburg Culture Office, with texts by Uwe M. Schneede, Achim Könneke, Ludger Derenthal
- Stephan Huber, Bauplatz, 1994, exhib. cat. Kunsthalle Mannheim, with an interview between Jochen Kronjäger and Stephan Huber
- Vier Texte zu Stephan Huber, 2001, exhib. cat. Kunstverein Hannover, Museum der bildenden Künste in Leipzig, Städtische Galerie im Lenbachhaus in Munich, four volumes in slipcase
- ...auf einer unsichtbaren strasse auf der höhe ihrer fenster...., 2006, catalogue for the Art Project Petuelpark, Prestel Verlag, Munich / New York, with texts by Uwe M. Schneede and Stephan Huber
- Montags bei Petula Park. 12 performative evenings in Café Petuelpark, 2008, edited by Stephan Huber and the Lenbachhaus in Munich
- Hans-Jürgen Hafner: Stephan Huber. Leibniz, Larifari und der Teufel, 2008, Kunstforum 191
- Evelyn Schels: Vor den Bergen: Der Bildhauer Stephan Huber, film documentation, first broadcast on 21 November 2010, Bayerisches Fernsehen
