= Association of the German Farmers Associations =

- Abbreviation: VdB
- Formation: 24 November 1900
- Founder: Representatives of the Baden, Bavaria, Alsace, Hesse, Nassau, Eastern and West Prussian, Rhenish, Silesian, Trier and Westphalian farmer associations
- Dissolved: 18 January 1934; 92 years ago
- Type: Amalgamation of Christian farmers’ organizations
- Official language: German
- Key people: Engelbert of Kerckerinck zur Borg, Andreas Hermes, Hermann Lünnick Berghausen
- Affiliations: Centre Party (Germany)

The Association of the German Farmers Associations (VdB) existed from 1900 to 1934 and was an amalgamation of Christian farmers’ organizations. From 1900 to 1916 it was called "Association of Christian German Farmers Associations" and from 1931 to 1934 it used the name "Association of German Christian Farmers Associations".

== History ==
The Association of the German Farmers Associations was an umbrella organization of Christian farmers’ organizations which belongs to mostly the Catholic milieu. It united mainly small and medium farmers. The VdB was politically associated with the right wing of the Centre Party. It was established as the "Association of Christian German Farmer Associations" on 24 November 1900, at a Conference in Frankfurt am Main, by representatives of the Baden, Bavaria, Alsace, Hesse, Nassau, Eastern and West Prussian, Rhenish, Silesian, Trier and Westphalian farmer associations. The member organizations, especially in the Catholic regions of Western and southern Germany, had been established in the 1880s and 1890s. In North and Eastern areas farmers were more frequently associated with the Agrarian League and the National Agricultural League. The emergence of these farmer associations can be seen in the broader context of the history of political Catholicism and the Catholic associations of the 19th century. VdB was a sister organization of the Bavarian People's Party (BVP) which had been established as a splinter of the Center Party in 1919. The Bavarian People's Party was a more politically oriented than the VdB.

The VdB was closely intertwined with the cooperative movement. The revolution of 1918 allowed the Christian Farmers Associations to recruit many new members and to attract new member organizations because farmers were enthusiastic about demands by the Independent Social Democratic Party of Germany and the majority Social Democratic Party of Germany for economic socialization as well as for the separation of Church and State in cultural and educational policy. At this time the VdB was able to recruit Protestant farmers’ association members.

With the agricultural crisis in the second half of the 1920s came fierce controversies within the Association as conservative and Protestant member associations demand a stronger Weimar Republic government and more cooperation with other, usually far more right-oriented, farmers’ associations. This led to splits and exclusions. The new President Andreas Hermes, long time Minister of Agriculture and food for the Centre Party (Germany) attempted to stop this development, but only partially succeeded. The Westphalian and Rhenish nobility demanded right oriented policy. In February 1929 the "Green Front" was formed by the Association of Christian German Farmers Associations, many of its member organizations, the National Agricultural League, the German Agriculture Council (Deutsche Landwirtschafsrat) and the German Farmers' Party (Deutsche Bauernshaft). This agricultural alliance supported state protectionist agriculture. Hermes, who resisted the Nazi claim to power in 1933, was arrested. His successor was ready to participate in the NS State. The National Socialist agricultural leader Richard Walther Darré disbanded the Association of German Farmers Associations on 18 January 1934. The member associations had been disbanded the previous year.

== President ==
- 1916-1927 Engelbert of Kerckerinck zur Borg
- 1928-1933 Andreas Hermes
- 1933-1934 Hermann Lünnick Berghausen

== Membership ==
- 1900 - 210,000
- 1901 - 220,000
- 1917 - 390,000
- 1920 - 450,000

== Affiliated associations ==
- Badischer Bauernverein
- Bayerischer Christlicher Bauernverein
- Bayerischer-Patriotischer Bauernverein
- Bezirksbauernschaft Osnabrück
- Christlicher Bauernverein von Mittelfranken
- Christlicher Bauernverein Oberschlesien
- Christlicher Bauernverein für Schwaben und Neuburg
- Christlicher Bauernverein für den Kreis Unterfranken und angrenzende Gebiete
- Eichsfelder Bauernverein
- Emsländischer Bauernverein
- Ermländischer Bauernverein
- Grenzmärkischer Bauernverein
- Hessischer Bauernverein
- Hohenzollerischer Bauernverein
- Kurhessischer Bauernverein
- Landwirtschaftlicher Hauptverband Württemberg und Hohenzollern
- Mittelrheinisch-Nassauischer Bauernverein
- Niederbayerischer Christlicher Bauernverein
- Oberbayerischer Christlicher Bauernverein
- Oberfränkischer Bauernverein
- Oberpfälzischer Christlicher Bauernverein
- Oldenburger Bauernverein
- Pfälzer Bauernverein
- Schlesischer Bauernverein
- Trierischer Bauernverein
- Vereinigung des Rheinischen Bauernvereins und des Rheinischen Landbundes
- Rheinischer Bauernverein
- Westfälischer Bauernverein

== Sources ==
- Lutz Fahlbusch/Edgar Hartwig, Vereinigung der deutschen Bauernvereine 1900-1934 (VdB), 1900-1916 Vereinigung der christlichen deutschen Bauernvereine, 1931-1934 Vereinigung der deutschen christlichen Bauernvereine, in Dieter Fricke u.a. (ed.), Lexikon zur Parteiengeschichte. Die bürgerlichen und kleinbürgerlichen Parteien und Verbände in Deutschland 1789-1945, Bd. 4, Leipzig/Cologne 1986, S. 344-357.
- Heide Barmeyer: Andreas Hermes und die Organisation der deutschen Landwirtschaft. Christliche Bauernvereine, Reichslandbund, Grüne Front, Reichsnährstand 1928 bis 1933 (Quellen und Forschungen zur Agrargeschichte Bd. 24), Stuttgart
- The Logic of Evil, The Social Origins of the Nazi Party, 1925-1933, William Brustein, Yale University Press, New Haven, CN, 1996
