= Thuringian Landtag elections in the Weimar Republic =

German state elections

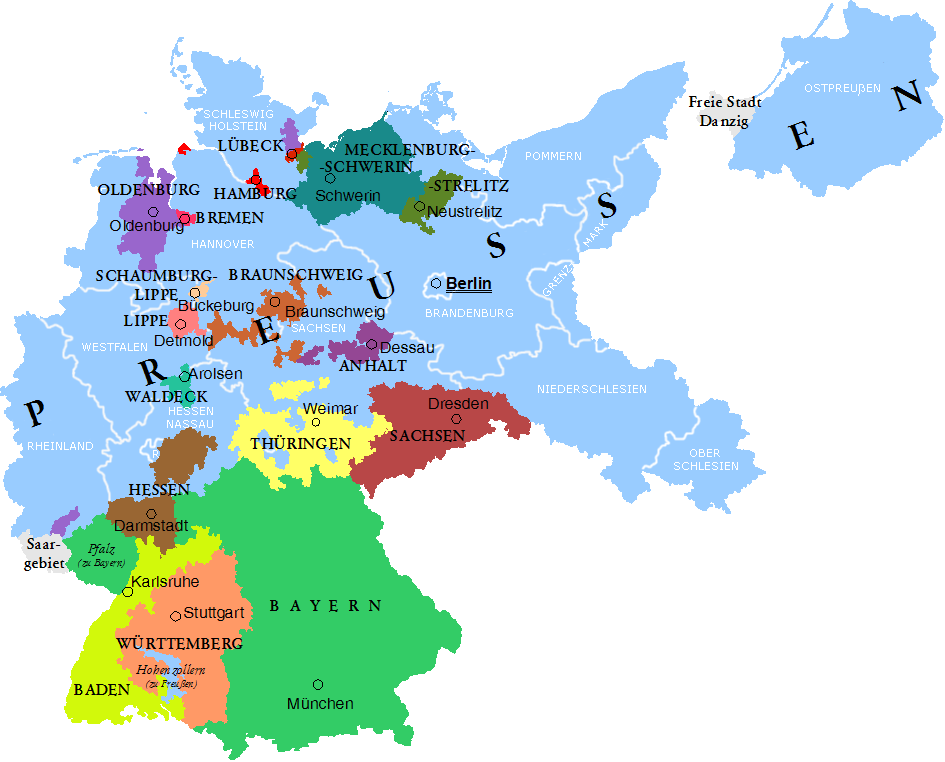
States of the Weimar Republic – Thuringia in yellow in the center

Landtag elections in the State of Thuringia (German: Land Thüringen) during the Weimar Republic were held at irregular intervals between 1920 and 1932. Results with regard to the total vote, the percentage of the vote won and the number of seats allocated to each party are presented in the tables below. On 31 March 1933, the sitting Landtag was dissolved by the Nazi-controlled central government and reconstituted to reflect the distribution of seats in the national Reichstag. The Landtag subsequently was formally abolished as a result of the "Law on the Reconstruction of the Reich" of 30 January 1934 which replaced the German federal system with a unitary state.

== 1920 ==
The 1920 Thuringian state election was held on 20 June 1920 to elect 53 members of the Landtag of Thuringia.

1920 Thuringian Landtag Election
Party	Votes	%	Seats
Independent Social Democratic Party of Germany	184,267	27.87	15
Thuringian Agricultural League	136,264	20.61	11
Social Democratic Party of Germany	134,581	20.35	11
German People's Party	104,239	15.77	8
German Democratic Party	48,280	7.30	4
German National People's Party	45,405	6.87	4
Communist Party of Germany	8,134	1.23	0
Centre Party	3	0.00	0
Total	661,173	100.00	53
Registered voters/turnout	803,529	–	
Source: Elections in the Weimar Republic, Elections in Germany

== 1921 ==
The 1921 Thuringian state election was held on 11 September 1921 to elect 54 members of the Landtag.

1921 Thuringian Landtag Election
Party	Votes	%	Seats	+/–
Social Democratic Party of Germany	154,576	22.84	13	+2
Thuringian Agricultural League	128,215	18.94	10	–1
Independent Social Democratic Party of Germany	110,990	16.40	9	–6
German People's Party	109,314	16.15	9	+1
Communist Party of Germany	73,709	10.89	6	+6
German National People's Party	50,679	7.49	4	0
German Democratic Party	37,761	5.58	3	–1
Centre Party	7,355	1.09	0	0
Wirtschaftsgruppe	4,183	0.62	0	New
Total	676,782	100.00	54	+1
Valid votes	676,782	99.62		
Invalid/blank votes	2,552	0.38		
Total votes	679,334	100.00		
Registered voters/turnout	937,634	72.45		
Source: Elections in the Weimar Republic, Elections in Germany

== 1924 ==
The 1924 Thuringian state election was held on 10 February 1924 to elect 72 members of the Landtag.

1924 Thuringian Landtag Election
Party	Votes	%	Seats	+/–
Order League	422,246	48.02	35	New
Social Democratic Party of Germany	203,456	23.14	17	+4
Communist Party of Germany	162,128	18.44	13	+7
National Socialist Freedom Movement	81,412	9.26	7	New
Independent Social Democratic Party of Germany	6,709	0.76	0	–9
Freiwirtschaftsbund	3,446	0.39	0	New
Total	879,397	100.00	72	+18
Valid votes	879,397	99.60		
Invalid/blank votes	3,557	0.40		
Total votes	882,954	100.00		
Registered voters/turnout	987,670	89.40		
Source: Elections in the Weimar Republic, Elections in Germany

== 1927 ==
The 1927 Thuringian state election was held on 30 January 1927 to elect 56 members of the Landtag.

1927 Thuringian Landtag Election (fixed)
Party	Votes	%	Seats	+/–
Unity List	270,568	33.68	19	New
Social Democratic Party of Germany	254,042	31.62	18	+1
Communist Party of Germany	113,295	14.10	8	–5
Reich Party of the German Middle Class	75,690	9.42	5	New
Nazi Party	27,946	3.48	2	New
German Democratic Party	26,832	3.34	2	New
Reich Party for Civil Rights and Deflation	22,077	2.75	1	New
German Völkisch Freedom Party	9,115	1.13	1	New
Communist Working Group	3,732	0.46	0	New
Total	803,297	100.00	56	–16
Valid votes	803,297	99.06		
Invalid/blank votes	7,638	0.94		
Total votes	810,935	100.00		
Registered voters/turnout	1,035,859	78.29		
Source: Elections in the Weimar Republic, Elections in Germany

== 1929 ==
The 1929 Thuringian state election was held on 8 December 1929 to elect 53 members of the Landtag. After the election, as the price for joining the coalition government of the Land (state) of Thuringia, the Nazi Party NSDAP received the state ministries of the Interior and Education. On 23 January 1930, Wilhelm Frick was appointed to these ministries, becoming the first Nazi to hold a ministerial-level post at any level in Germany.

1929 Thuringian Landtag Election
Party	Votes	%	Seats	+/–
Social Democratic Party of Germany	258,042	32.30	18	0
Christian-National Peasants' and Farmers' Party	131,214	16.43	9	New
Nazi Party	90,159	11.29	6	+4
Communist Party of Germany	85,209	10.67	6	–2
Reich Party of the German Middle Class	76,535	9.58	6	+1
German People's Party	70,567	8.83	5	New
German National People's Party	31,736	3.97	2	New
German Democratic Party	23,393	2.93	1	–1
Communist Party of Germany (Opposition)	12,222	1.53	0	New
Centre Party	9,651	1.21	0	New
Reich Party for Civil Rights and Deflation	9,631	1.21	0	New
German House and Property Owners' Party	427	0.05	0	New
Total	798,786	100.00	53	–3
Valid votes	798,786	98.98		
Invalid/blank votes	8,200	1.02		
Total votes	806,986	100.00		
Registered voters/turnout	1,078,129	74.85		
Source: Elections in the Weimar Republic, Elections in Germany

== 1932 ==
The 1932 Thuringian state election was held on 31 July 1932 to elect 61 members of the Landtag.

1932 Thuringian Landtag Election
Party	Votes	%	Seats	+/–
Nazi Party	395,321	42.49	26	+20
Social Democratic Party of Germany	225,791	24.27	15	–3
Communist Party of Germany	150,045	16.13	10	+4
Thuringian Agricultural League	77,678	8.35	6	New
German National People's Party	29,624	3.18	2	0
German State Party	17,442	1.87	1	New
German People's Party	16,745	1.80	1	–4
Reich Party of the German Middle Class	10,411	1.12	0	–6
Christian Social People's Service	5,322	0.57	0	New
Socialist Workers' Party of Germany	2,067	0.22	0	New
Total	930,446	100.00	61	+8
Valid votes	930,446	98.05		
Invalid/blank votes	18,514	1.95		
Total votes	948,960	100.00		
Registered voters/turnout	1,114,887	85.12		
Source: Elections in the Weimar Republic, Elections in Germany
