= Lindenberg im Allgäu =

- Town
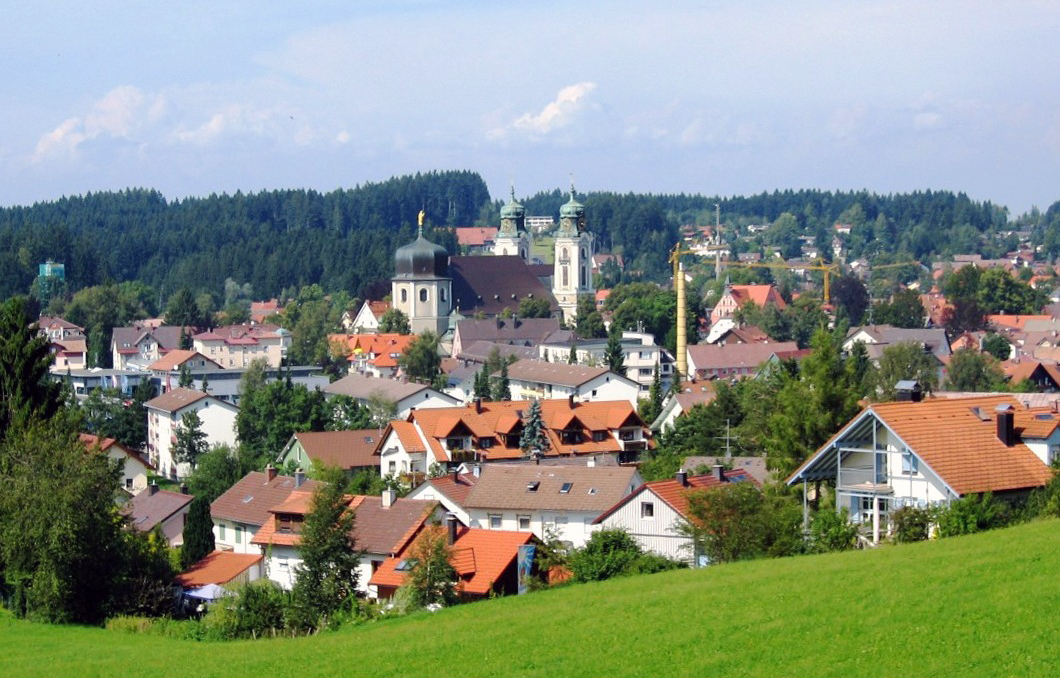
- View of the town

- Coat of arms

- Location of Lindenberg im Allgäu within Lindau district
- Interactive map of Lindenberg im Allgäu
- Location within Germany Location within Bavaria
- Coordinates: 47°36′N 09°54′E
- Country: Germany
- State: Bavaria
- Admin. region: Schwaben
- District: Lindau

Government
  - Mayor (2020–26): Eric Ballerstedt (CSU)

Area
  - Total: 11.84 km^{2} (4.57 sq mi)
- Elevation: 764 m (2,507 ft)

Population (2025-12-31)
  - Total: 11,572
  - Density: 977.4/km^{2} (2,531/sq mi)
- Time zone: UTC+01:00 (CET)
  - Summer (DST): UTC+02:00 (CEST)
- Postal codes: 88161
- Dialling codes: 08381
- Vehicle registration: LI
- Website: www.lindenberg.de

Lindenberg im Allgäu (German pronunciation: [ˈlɪndn̩ˌbɛʁk ʔɪm ˈʔalɡɔʏ], lit. 'Lindenberg in the Allgäu'; Low Alemannic: Lindaberg) is the second largest town of the district of Lindau in Bavaria, Germany. It is an acknowledged air health resort.

== History ==
The town was first mentioned in 857, when two nobles donated in "Lintiberc" to the monastery of St. Gall.

In 1570, the Austrian branch of the House of Habsburg acquired the demesne of the heirless sovereignty of Altenburg, including Lindenberg, back then a consolidation of about 70 farms.

The city fell to Bavaria in 1805 as part of Napoleon's Treaty of Pressburg.

As early as 1656 straw hats from Lindenberg were sold by peddling and in markets. In 1755, the production and shipping of straw hats became organized. The hat industry has declined in recent decades and now has hardly any economic importance. Hat making is still remembered today in an annual "Huttag" ("hat day") as well as in a hat museum.

== Education ==
Lindenberg has a primary school, a Mittelschule, a Realschule and a Gymnasium. One notable Gymnasium is Gymnasium Lindenberg.

The Humboldt-Institut for German as a foreign language runs a boarding school for international students as well as accommodate international students enrollment into public and private schools.

The Bavarian Red Cross runs vocational schools for Nursing and Elderly Care in Lindenberg.

== Geographical Features ==
=== Waldsee ===
The Waldsee is one of the highest moors in Germany at 765.4 m (2511.2 ft). It was initially established as a fish pond in the Middle Ages, but today it is used as a swimming area.

== Climate ==
Climate data for Lindenberg im Allgäu (1991–2020 normals)
Month	Jan	Feb	Mar	Apr	May	Jun	Jul	Aug	Sep	Oct	Nov	Dec	Year
Mean daily maximum °C (°F)	2.8 (37.0)	4.5 (40.1)	8.6 (47.5)	15.0 (59.0)	19.5 (67.1)	22.7 (72.9)	24.7 (76.5)	24.6 (76.3)	19.6 (67.3)	13.6 (56.5)	7.4 (45.3)	3.7 (38.7)	13.9 (57.0)
Daily mean °C (°F)	0.4 (32.7)	1.4 (34.5)	4.5 (40.1)	9.8 (49.6)	14.2 (57.6)	17.4 (63.3)	19.4 (66.9)	19.1 (66.4)	14.6 (58.3)	9.6 (49.3)	4.7 (40.5)	1.5 (34.7)	9.7 (49.5)
Mean daily minimum °C (°F)	−2.2 (28.0)	−1.6 (29.1)	0.8 (33.4)	4.8 (40.6)	9.0 (48.2)	12.2 (54.0)	14.5 (58.1)	14.2 (57.6)	10.3 (50.5)	6.1 (43.0)	2.1 (35.8)	−0.9 (30.4)	5.8 (42.4)
Average precipitation mm (inches)	42.6 (1.68)	33.8 (1.33)	41.2 (1.62)	29.6 (1.17)	49.4 (1.94)	57.4 (2.26)	78.1 (3.07)	58.5 (2.30)	46.4 (1.83)	40.7 (1.60)	40.7 (1.60)	41.1 (1.62)	559.5 (22.03)
Average precipitation days (≥ 1.0 mm)	17.0	14.4	14.5	11.6	13.0	12.6	14.1	12.4	12.0	14.2	14.6	16.6	167.1
Average snowy days (≥ 1.0 cm)	11.0	8.4	3.6	0.3	0	0	0	0	0	0	1.5	6.4	31.2
Average relative humidity (%)	87.1	82.7	76.8	67.3	67.4	67.9	68.6	69.3	76.5	82.9	88.5	88.6	77.0
Mean monthly sunshine hours	54.0	77.6	131.7	198.9	230.3	233.7	239.8	224.5	172.3	118.7	59.8	46.5	1,787.6
Source: World Meteorological Organization

== Economy ==
Important employers are:

- Liebherr-Aerospace Lindenberg GmbH
- Mayser GmbH & Co.KG

== International relations ==
Lindenberg im Allgäu is twinned with:

- 1999: Vallauris-Golfe-Juan France
- 2003: Saline, Michigan USA

== Notable people from Lindenberg ==
- Heike Allgayer (born 1969), physician and molecular biologist
- Arthur Burkhard (1928–2020), picture journalist
- Anton Fehr (1881–1954), agricultural scientist and politician
- Otto Geßler (1875–1955), politician and president of the German Red Cross
- Klaus Gietinger (born 1955), film director and script writer
- Stephan Huber (born 1952), sculptor
- Markus Miller (born 1982), football goalkeeper
- Johann Georg Specht (1720–1803), architect
- Werner Specht (born 1942), painter and chansonnier
- Tobias Steinhauser (born 1972), cyclist
