= Edgar Hartwig =

German historian (born 1928)

Edgar Hartwig (born 22 February 1928) is an East German historian. In the GDR he taught scientific socialism at the Hochschule für Musik Franz Liszt, Weimar until 1989 and, within the framework of the "Arbeitsgruppe zur Geschichte der bürgerlichen Parteien" at the Friedrich-Schiller-Universität Jena, he presented the history of the Pan-German League and the German Agrarian League.

== Life ==
Born in Ichstedt, Hartwig passed his Abitur in 1946 and joined the SED in the same year. He first attended the Institut für Lehrerbildung in Nordhausen and worked as a primary school teacher from 1947 to 1950. After taking part in a course to qualify Oberschule, he took up a post as a teacher at the Institut für Lehrerbildung in Nordhausen in 1951.

From 1952 to 1953, Hartwig was a full-time party instructor in the SED State leadership of Thuringia. In 1954/55, he was Party Secretary of the SED district leadership Weimar city.

From 1956 to 1958, Hartwig studied Social Sciences at the Parteihochschule Karl Marx with the Central Committee of the SED in East Berlin. He completed his studies in 1958 with a degree in social sciences and then worked again as secretary of the SED district leadership in Weimar-Stadt.

From 1962 to 1965, Hartwig worked as a senior research assistant for scientific socialism at the Hochschule für Musik Franz Liszt Weimar. In 1962, he was also awarded an extraordinary scientific aspirantship at the Friedrich Schiller University of Jena. From 1965 on, he served as vice-rector for social sciences at the Weimar University of Music, and in July 1966 he received his doctorate under Dieter Fricke and Heinz Herz "On the politics and development of the Pan-German League from its foundation to the beginning of World War I (1891-1914)". In September 1967 he became a lecturer for the history of the German Labour movement in the department Marxism-Leninism in Weimar. In 1972, he received a full professorship for scientific communism there. In January 1980 he received his doctorate in Jena with Dieter Fricke, Manfred Weißbecker and Annelies Laschitza on "The 'middle class policy' of the German Agrarian League 1893 to 1914".

With effect from 10 November 1989 Hartwig was released from his functions as Prorector for Social Sciences and sent on a "one-year working holiday".

== Work ==
Hartwig's academic work was created within the framework of the Jena "Working Group on the History of the Bourgeois Parties" headed by Dieter Fricke. Hartwig contributed articles to the Handbuch der Geschichte der bürgerlichen Parteien und andere bürgerlichen Interessenorganisationen vom Vormärz bis zum Jahr 1945 (1968 and 1970) and its successor project, the four-volume Lexikon zur Parteiengeschichte (1983-1986). It was based on the Marxist-Leninist theories on monopoly capitalism. In his work on the Alldeutsche Verband (AV) he argued, for example, that the association was "the spearhead, the ideological and political pacemaker of the German monopoly capital, which represented with considerable success the aims of the most aggressive and reactionary parts of the monopoly capital with the aim of making them the political programme of the government, all social institutions of the ruling classes and a part of the people belonging to the monopoly capital". As evidence, Hartwig referred to the financing of the association by heavy industry and the growing influence of the group around Heinrich Claß and Alfred Hugenberg, which brought the AV completely under the control of the Ruhr monopolies.

The musicologist and former rector (1993-2001) of the "Hochschule für Musik Franz List Weimar", Wolfram Huschke, criticises Hartwig's efforts to give political-ideological education priority over musical education as "Prorector for Social Sciences" at the Musikhochschule. Even though the Marxist-Leninist foundation course was officially accorded the same importance as the main subject, the success was only relative and glossed over in a whitewashing manner. In the commemorative publication for the 100th anniversary of the Hochschule für Musik Weimar, for which Hartwig was responsible as head of the editorial team, reality was deliberately distorted and adapted to the wishes and doctrines of the students.

== Publications ==
- Zur Politik und Entwicklung des Alldeutschen Verbandes von seiner Gründung bis zum Beginn des ersten Weltkrieges. [S.n.], Jena 1966.
- "Der Alldeutsche Verband und Polen." In Wissenschaftliche Zeitschrift // Friedrich-Schiller-Universität Jena.19, Nr. 2 1970, pp. 251–276.
- (ed.): Festschrift der Hochschule für Musik "Franz Liszt" Weimar. Zum hundertsten Jahrestag ihrer Gründung als Orchesterschule: 1872–1972. Hochschule für Musik "Franz Liszt", Weimar 1972.
- "Auf dem Wege zur sozialistischen Stadt". In Das Volk; 1975 v. 27. Sept.19, 382 1975.
- Weimar auf dem Weg zum Sozialismus. April 1945 bis April 1946. Stadtmuseum Weimar, 1976.
- Die "Mittelstandspolitik" des Bundes der Landwirte 1893 bis 1914. 1980.
