= Weimar. Lexikon zur Stadtgeschichte =

1993 Encyclopaedia of Weimar, Germany

Weimar. Lexikon zur Stadtgeschichte is the title of an encyclopedia on the history of the German city of Weimar. The non-fiction book was first published in 1993 and improved in 1997 by Böhlau Verlag in a second edition. It was edited by Gitta Günther, who worked as a Weimar city archivist from 1959 to 2001, together with the musicologist Wolfram Huschke and the geologist Walter Steiner. The book with numerous illustrations and more than 500 pages was last published with the ISBN 3-7400-0807-5.

== Media ==
- N.N. (July 12, 1993). "Weimar-Lexicon / Stadt-Histörchen alphabetical". Der Spiegel. No. 28/1993.
