= Thuringian Agricultural League =

Political party

The Thuringian Agricultural League (German: Thüringer Landbund) was a political party in Germany between 1920 and 1933. Part of the wider Agricultural League, it was often allied with the German National People's Party (DNVP).

== History ==
Established in 1920, the party won 11 seats in the Thuringian Landtag in the elections that year, receiving 21% of the vote and becoming the second-largest party in the Landtag. Elections the following year saw the party reduced to 10 seats, although it remained the second-largest party.

For the 1924 and 1927 state elections the party was part of the Thuringian Order League, an alliance with the DNVP and the German People's Party (DVP). The alliance won 48% of the vote in 1924, taking 35 of the 72 seats. Although the alliance's vote share was reduced to 34% in 1927, it remained the largest faction in the Landtag.

Running alone in the 1929 state elections, the party won nine seats, making it the second-largest party after the SPD. The party contested the November 1932 federal elections as part of an alliance with the DNVP and DVP. It won a single seat, whilst the DNVP won 51 and the DVP 11. In the same year it won six seats in the state elections.

Together with the DNVP, the party did not contest the March 1933 elections, subsequently losing its seat in the Reichstag.
