= Andreas Hermes =

German agricultural scientist and politician (1878–1964)

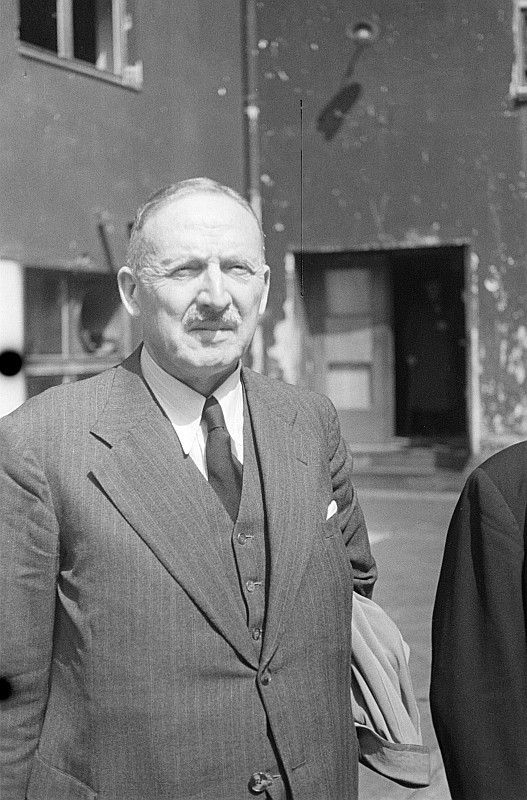
- Hermes in the late 1940s

Reich Minister of Finance
- In office 26 October 1921 – 13 August 1923
- Chancellor: Joseph Wirth; Wilhelm Cuno
- Preceded by: Joseph Wirth
- Succeeded by: Rudolf Hilferding

Reich Minister for Food and Agriculture
- In office 30 March 1920 – 30 March 1922
- Chancellor: Hermann Müller; Constantin Fehrenbach; Joseph Wirth
- Preceded by: Karl Müller
- Succeeded by: Gerhard von Kanitz

Member of the Reichstag
- In office 14 June 1928 – 17 March 1933
- Constituency: Cologne–Aachen

Personal details
- Born: 16 July 1878; Cologne, Kingdom of Prussia, German Empire
- Died: 4 January 1964 (aged 85); Krälingen, West Germany
- Political party: Zentrum; Christian Democratic Union

Andreas Hermes (16 July 1878 – 4 January 1964) was a German agricultural scientist and politician. In the Weimar Republic, he was a member of several governments, serving as minister of food/nutrition and minister of finance for the Catholic Zentrum. During the rule of the Nazi Party, Hermes was part of the right-wing resistance, for which he was imprisoned and sentenced to death, but never executed thanks to the intervention of his wife. After World War II, he co-founded the Christian Democratic Union in East Germany.

== Early life ==
Hermes was born on 16 July 1878 in Cologne, then part of the Prussian Rhine province, as the son of Andreas Hermes (1832–1884), a railway worker, and his wife Theresia (1839–1905, née Schmitz). He was raised as a Catholic in Mönchengladbach, and lost his father at the age of 8.

Hermes studied agricultural science and philosophy at Bonn, Jena and Berlin. At that time he also travelled widely in Europe and South America, and he developed an interest in crossbreeding European with South American animal stock. In 1901 he became a teacher of agriculture at Cloppenburg, and from 1902 to 1904 was assistant to an animal breeder at Bonn. In 1905/06 Hermes was awarded a doctorate at Jena with a dissertation on the optimization of crop rotation and then became a research associate at the animal breeding department of the Deutsche Landwirtschaftsgesellschaft (German Agricultural Society) in Berlin. In 1911 Hermes was appointed director of the agricultural department of the International Institute of Agriculture in Rome. With the start of World War I, he returned to Germany and worked first for the general staff, then in several functions in the bureaucracy in charge of the national food supply (Kriegsernährungswirtschaft), including organising the cultivation of oil seed in the Danube district and in the area near Lake Constance.

== Weimar Republic ==
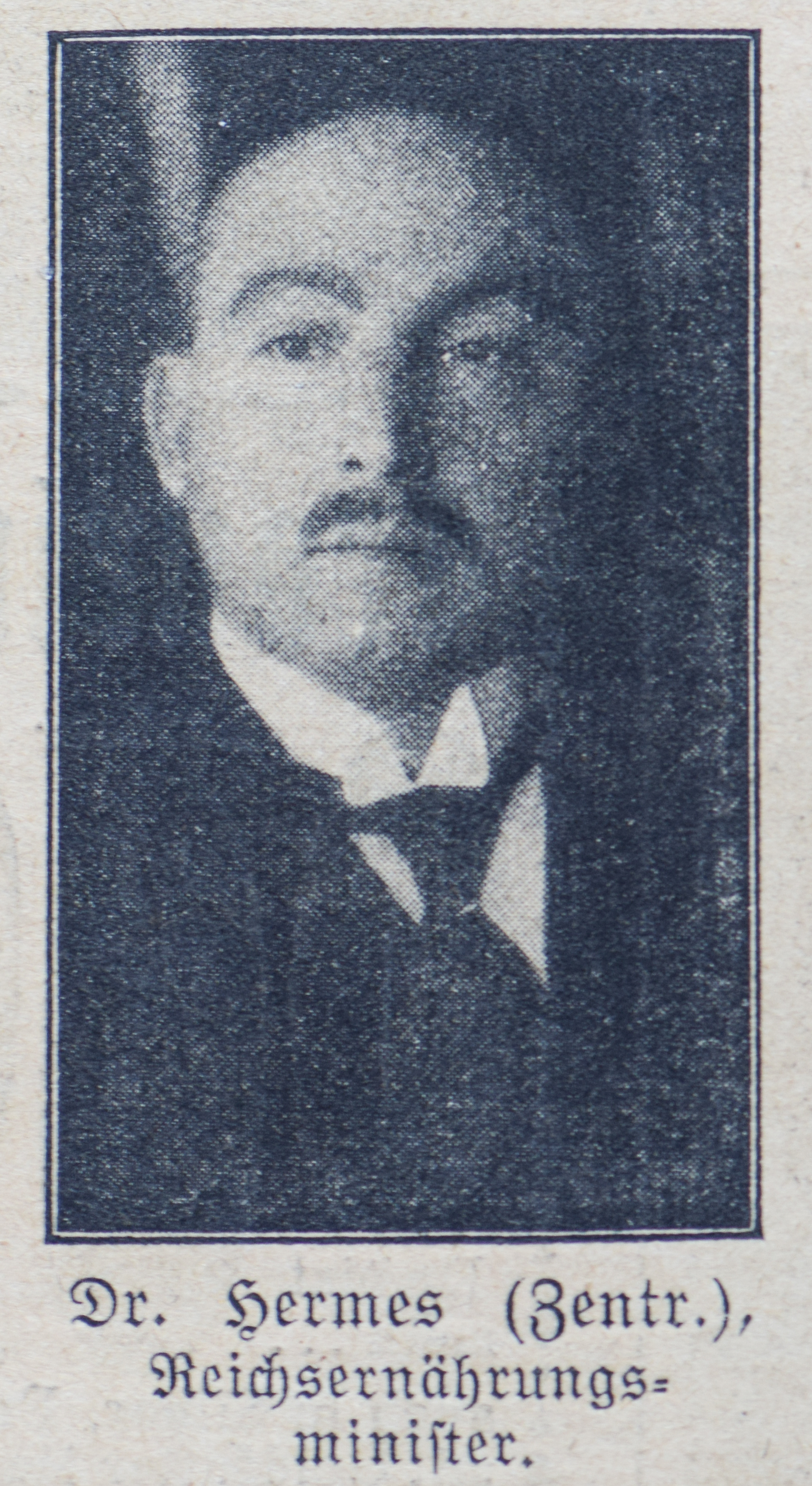
Andreas Hermes - Former minister in Weimar Republic and cofounder of the Christian Democratic Union of East Germany

After the end of the war, in 1919, Hermes headed the department on agriculture and forestry of the Reichswirtschaftsministerium (Ministry of Economic Affairs). He joined the Catholic Zentrum. In the first Müller cabinet Hermes became Reichsernährungsminister (Minister for Nutrition/Food) in March 1920. Also in 1920, Hermes married Anna Schaller (b. 1894). They had three sons and one (or according to a different source, two) daughters.

During his period in office, the Reichsernährungsministerium was restructured according to his suggestions. In 1922 Hermes in addition to his post as Reichsernährungsminister became Minister of Finance. After a short while he resigned from the former post but remained in charge of Finance. He stayed in that office until the resignation of the cabinet of Wilhelm Cuno in August 1923.

Whilst serving as a minister, Hermes managed the transition from technocratic expert to politician. In 1924 he was elected for the Zentrum to the Prussian Diet and in 1928 to the Reichstag. In 1927 he was a member of the German delegation at the International Economic Conference at Geneva. In 1928 he led the German delegation in trade negotiations with Poland. At the same time, Hermes was active in the lobbying/umbrella organizations of the German agricultural industry. In 1928, he became president of the Association of the German Farmers Associations and after the economic crisis of the Great Depression started, this organization became part of the "Green Front". In 1930, he became president of the Reichsverband der deutschen landwirtschaftlichen Genossenschaften-Raiffeisen (National Association of German Agricultural Cooperatives).

== Nazi Germany ==
In March 1933, even before the passage of the Ermächtigungsgesetz he resigned from the Reichstag in protest against Nazi policies. He was arrested, charged and, on 12 July, sentenced to four months in prison for his opposition to the Nazis. He then was either affected by an amnesty, or released as his time served in jail counted towards the sentence, according to different sources. He resigned from his positions in the agricultural organizations and in 1936 emigrated to Colombia. There he worked as an economic advisor to the government in Bogotá from 1936 to 1939. He returned to Germany to collect his family, but the eruption of World War II prevented his departure back to South America.

He soon joined the circle around the Catholic Ketteler House in Cologne. From 1942, Hermes was in touch with members of the resistance like Carl Friedrich Goerdeler and the Kreisau Circle. Immediately after 20 July 1944 he was arrested and on 11 January 1945 sentenced to death for being an active member of the conspiracy to kill Hitler. In one of Goerdeler's lists he was named as a post-putsch minister for agriculture. However, his wife succeeded in delaying his execution until the Red Army occupied Berlin.

== Post-war ==
On 7 May 1945, the Soviet occupation authorities appointed Hermes as chief of the nutrition/food department of the city of Berlin. On 19 May 1945, Hermes became one of four deputy mayors of Berlin. He was the only non-communist/socialist member of the city council. He used his positions to work against the threat of a division of Germany. On 26 June 1945 he was one of the founder-members and the first chairman of the Christlich-Demokratische Union (CDU) of Berlin and the Soviet-occupied zone. As a result of his attempts to lead a pan-German policy and his refusal to agree to the so-called Bodenreform, he was deposed on 19 December 1945 by the Soviet occupation forces as chairman of the CDU. Seeing no chance of continuing to work in Eastern Germany, he left for Bad Godesberg in Western Germany at the end of 1945 where he continued to work against a division of the country. He founded the Gesellschaft für die Wiedervereinigung Deutschlands (Society for the Reunification of Germany) placing himself in opposition to the views of Konrad Adenauer. At a party convention at Neheim-Hüsten the western CDU passed a new party manifesto in February 1946, mostly ignoring Hermes' views.

In 1947, Hermes became a member of the Bizonal Economic Council (Wirtschaftsrat des Vereinigten Wirtschaftsgebietes), as chairman of the food committee. In 1948, he was elected president of the Deutscher Bauernverband, which he founded. He was also made president of the Deutscher Raiffeisenverband. In 1949, he founded the Godesberger Kreis, an organization working towards the reunification of Germany and an improvement in political relations with Eastern Europe, views that were highly controversial in the CDU at that time.

From 1954-58, he was president, later until his death honorary chairman, of the European Confederation of Agriculture (CEA). Simultaneously he served as vice-president of the International Federation of Agricultural Producers.

Hermes died on 4 January 1964 in Krälingen/Eifel.
