= Agricultural League =

Association in the German Reich

The Agricultural League (German: Reichs-Landbund) or National Rural League was a German agrarian association and political party during the Weimar Republic associated with landowners who owned property in East Elbia. The party was aligned with the nationalist German National People's Party and later the national-socialist Nazi Party.

== History ==
The National Rural League (Reichs-Landbund) was established in 1921 by the merger of the two major Protestant right-wing farmers' organizations German Agrarian League (BDL) and German Landbund to more effectively advance agrarian interests to be able to prevail against the resurgent forces of labor and big business. The leadership pursued an anti-democratic, nationalist course with rejection of the Weimar Republic, at the same time under the existing system it attempted to maintain as much influence as possible for the big Junker landowners from east of the Elbe. The large landowners from East of the Elbe were strongly represented in the governing bodies. The Reich Landbund was the most influential German farmers' association during the Weimar Republic. Particular focus of the association were Pomerania, Brandenburg, Silesia, Thuringia, East Hanover and Hesse. It could not gain a foothold with rural society in the rural areas of the Catholic regions of the empire of the Empire. Here, the Association of the German Farmers Associations dominated.

The National Rural League created a strong central organization with connections to numerous newspapers. In 1928 there were 190 press organs associated with the National Rural League, belonging to it, or belonging to members of the association. In 1924 the league had about 500 district offices. As a result, in the areas were the organization was strong large parts of the agricultural population that were not members of the National Rural League could be greatly influenced by League positions.

Politically the National Rural League was near the German National People's Party (DNVP) because both were opposed to the Republic. In 1924 the party supported this association particularly strongly, but also promoted candidacies of senior members of other right-wing parties, especially the German People's Party (DVP). In the 1925 German presidential election, the National Rural League supported the election of Paul von Hindenburg. In the mid-1920s, leading National Rural League members of the DNVP were represented in the government.

This phase of government cooperation was short-lived. Import tariff issues and the agrarian crisis exacerbated the distance between the League and the government and the Republic. The support of the government had led, especially in Hesse and Silesia, to massive membership losses. Rural League officials were involved with the 1927/28 country people's movement. They split several Landbund leaders from the DNVP and founded the Christian-National Peasants' and Farmers' Party (CNBLP, The CNBLP was renamed German Country People's in 1930). The new party took 10 seats from the DNVP in the 1928 Reichstag elections. There was significant turbulence within National Rural League. The battle against other farmers' organizations was largely discontinued. In order to obtain greater influence in the agricultural and economic crisis, in 1929 the National Rural League was the driving force establishing a new umbrella organization of farmers' associations, the Green Front.

In 1929 The National Rural League supported the 1929 German referendum against the Young Plan which was initiated by the DNVP, Nazi Party (NSDAP) and other legal associations. Through their leading member, Martin Schiele, the National Rural League was involved in the government of Heinrich Brüning, which led to the expulsion of the Schiele group from the DNVP and helped the German Country People's Party (CNBLP) to make large gains in the 1930 German federal election. However, as the Nazi Party achieved great progress in the countryside with construction of their agrarian political apparatus, the Nazis now gained more and more influence in the National Rural League. In October 1930 Martin Schiele had to resign as President of the National Rural League, and the new board moved to the right. The Schiele group was repressed and the Nazis gained ground. Other groups in the National Rural League believed they could win back lost ground in agriculture through an alliance with the Nazi influence. The agitation against the Brüning Government, democracy and the Weimar Republic increased and in 1931 the National Rural League joined the Harzburg Front. In the presidential election in 1932, the leadership of the National Rural League recommended a vote for the national German Stahlhelm leader Theodor Duesterberg or Adolf Hitler, because Hindenburg had not distanced himself from his support of the Social Democratic Party of Germany (SPD).

The transfer of power to Hitler on 30 January 1933 was welcomed by the League leadership, so that there was no resistance by the largest German agriculture organization to the Nazi Coordination (Gleichschaltung) of agriculture and their state administrative body regulating food production (Reichsnährstand).

== Presidents ==
- 1921–1924: Gustav Roesicke (executive)
- 1921–1930: Karl Hepp
- 1926–1928: Count Eberhard von Kalckreuth
- 1928–1930: Martin Schiele (executive)
- 1930–1933: Count Eberhard von Kalckreuth (executive)
- 1930–1933: Henry Lind
- 1931–1933: Werner Willikens
- 1933: Wilhelm Meinberg (executive)

== Membership ==
1923: approximately 1 million

The exact number can not be determined because the number of affiliated organizations varied and no distinction has been made between full-time and auxiliary members. As self-reported there were 5.6 million members allegedly present during the peak period. Based on a published list with details of the members of the affiliated associations in 1923, there were around 1 million members. Other estimates range from 0.8 to 1.7 million members.

== Affiliated Associations (1928) ==
Some regional groups of the Agricultural League participated in state and Reichstag elections, such as the Hessische Bauernbund, Thuringian Agricultural League, and Württembergischer Bauern- und Weingärtnerbund.

- Landbund Anhalt (10,000 members)
- Baden Landbund (40,000)
- Association of farmers in Bavaria (27,000)
- Brandenburgischer Landbund (118,670)
- Braunschweigischer Landbund (12,000)
- Danziger Land League (4000)
- Grenzmark-South (8800)
- Hanoverian Landbund (no details)
- Landbund for the Hanseatic cities of Hamburg and Lübeck (2000)
- Hessen, Federal (25,744)
- Kurhessischer Landbund (40,000)
- Lippe Land League (2500)
- Landbund for the country of Lubeck (735)
- Country association of Mecklenburg-Schwerin (6180)
- Mecklenburg-Strelitz Land League (6180)
- Nassau County peasantry and the circle Wetzlar, Limburg (30,000)
- Upper Silesian Land League (10,000)
- Landbund for Austria (85,000)
- Landbund Oldenburg-Bremen (14,799)
- Agricultural Association of East Prussia (46,000)
- Pomeranian Landbund (140,000)
- Palatine Farmers' Federation (15,000)
- Country Rhenish Confederation (21,000)
- Saxon Land League (60,000)
- Landbund Province of Saxony (86,400)
- Silesian Land League (75,000)
- Landbund Schleswig-Holstein (17,774)
- Thuringian Agricultural League (41,150)
- Waldeckische shear Land League (3066)
- Westphalian federal land (15,515)
- Württemberg peasants and tenants covenant Federation of Farmers (40,000)

Source: Cerny / Fahlbusch, pp. 688–689.

== See also ==
- German Farmers' Association (DBV, Deutscher Bauernverband)

== Sources ==
- Heide Barmeyer: Andreas Hermes und die Organisation der deutschen Landwirtschaft. Christliche Bauernvereine, Reichslandbund, Grüne Front, Reichsnährstand 1928 bis 1933. (= Quellen und Forschungen zur Agrargeschichte Bd. 24), Stuttgart 1971.
- Jochen Cerny, Lutz Fahlbusch: Reichs-Landbund (RLB) 1921–1933. In: Dieter Fricke u. a. (Hrsg.): Lexikon zur Parteiengeschichte. Die bürgerlichen und kleinbürgerlichen Parteien und Verbände in Deutschland 1789–1945, Bd. 3, Leipzig/Köln 1985, S. 689–712.
- Horst Gies: NSDAP und landwirtschaftliche Organisationen in der Endphase der Weimarer Republik. In: VfZG 15/1967, S. 341–376.
- Horst Gies: R. Walter Darré und die nationalsozialistische Bauernpolitik in den Jahren 1930–1933. Diss. Frankfurt am Main 1966.
- Organisationsbuch des Reichs-Landbundes. Bearbeitet und zusammengestellt von der Organisation des Reichs-Landbundes 1930, Berlin 1930.
- Martin Schumacher: Land und Politik. Eine Untersuchung über politische Parteien und agrarische Interessen 1914–1923. Hrsg. von der Kommission für Geschichte des Parliamentarismus und der politischen Parteien, Düsseldorf 1978.
