= Wolfram Huschke =

German musicologist (born 1946)

Wolfram Huschke (18 April 1946) is a German musicologist.

== Life ==
Born in Weimar, Huschke's ancestors were physicians who stood in the circle of Johann Wolfgang von Goethe and Friedrich Schiller and also treated them. One Huschke, namely Wilhelm Ernst Christian Huschke, was ultimately involved in Schiller's autopsy section and wrote his autopsy report. Wolfram Huschke is the son of the archivist Wolfgang Huschke.

Huschke was a school musician and has been a professor of music didactics at the Hochschule für Musik Franz Liszt, Weimar since 1993. Prior to this, in 1977 he received his doctorate in the field of musicology at the Martin-Luther-University Halle-Wittenberg.

From 1993 to 2001 he was rector of this university. From 1989 to 1997 he was director of the Institute for School Music. From 1991 to 1993 he was dean of this department. Since 2001 he was the director of the Franz Liszt Centre. Since 1990 Huschke has been vice president, and from 2000 president of the Franz Liszt Society in Weimar. From 1990 to 1993 he was president of the city council of Weimar.

Huschke's main research focus is the music history of Weimar. He wrote, for example, about Franz Liszt. He was a major contributor to the Weimar. Lexikon zur Stadtgeschichte.

In 2005 Huschke was awarded the Federal Cross of Merit on Ribbon. In 2012 he became honorary senator of the Franz Liszt Academy of Music Weimar. In 2014 he was awarded the Order of Merit of the Free State of Thuringia.
