= Franz Sperr =

German officer and resistance member (1878–1945)

Personal details
- Born: 12 February 1878 Karlstadt am Main, German Empire
- Died: 23 January 1945 (aged 66) Plötzensee Prison, Berlin, Germany
- Profession: Officer

Franz Sperr (born 12 February 1878 in Karlstadt-sur-le-Main; died 23 January 1945 in Berlin) was a member of German resistance against Nazism.

== Biography ==
Franz Sperr was the son of an engineer from the Royal Bavarian Railways. His family moved a few times and lived in different places. After his "abitur" in 1897, he first did voluntary service in the Bavarian army and then chose it as a career. From 1906 to 1909, Sperr received training at the Bavarian War Academy which enabled him to join the staff.

During the First World War, he was a captain and then a major. In 1916, he left for Berlin and was responsible for representing the army to the Bundesrat. After the war, it is made available. He became a civil servant and worked for the Bavarian Embassy in Berlin. Partisan of federalism, opposed to Nazism, he resigned from the public service on 20 June 1934, set up his business and joined the resistance.

He was in contact with Rupprecht, Crown Prince of Bavaria and supported the military. He brought together a small group of Bavarian monarchists such as ministers Otto Geßler, Anton Fehr, Eduard Hamm, but also bankers and businessmen. Faced with the impossibility of bringing down Hitler, he organized himself with the resistance groups in Switzerland and in Bavaria after the Allied landings with military and police officers from the Third Reich. Thanks to Alfred Delp and Augustin Rösch, he came into contact during the winter of 1942 with the Kreisau Circle and notably met Helmuth James von Moltke. In June 1944, a meeting with Claus von Stauffenberg took place, Sperr expressed his skepticism of a coup.

== Death ==
After the failure of the 20 July plot, Sperr was arrested for his complicity. The Volksgerichtshof condemned him to death on 11 January 1945. He was hanged on the 23rd in Plötzensee Prison.
