= Karl Müller (politician) =

German politician

Member of the Bundestag
- In office 7 September 1949 – 6 October 1957

Personal details
- Born: 29 July 1884
- Died: 18 April 1964 (aged 79)
- Party: CDU

Karl Müller (July 29, 1884 – April 18, 1964) was a German politician of the Christian Democratic Union (CDU) and former member of the German Bundestag.

== Life ==
Müller joined the Centre Party in 1908. After 1945 he participated in the building of the CDU.

In 1946/47 he was a member of the first and second appointed state parliament of North Rhine-Westphalia. In 1947 he was elected to the first freely elected state parliament, of which he was a member until 1950. Here he was deputy chairman of the CDU faction from 1947 to 1949. He was a member of the German Bundestag from 1949 to 1957. He represented the constituency of Geilenkirchen - Erkelenz - Jülich in parliament. From 12 October 1950 to 1953 he was Deputy Chairman of the Bundestag Committee for Food, Agriculture and Forestry.

== Literature ==
Herbst, Ludolf; Jahn, Bruno (2002). Vierhaus, Rudolf (ed.). Biographisches Handbuch der Mitglieder des Deutschen Bundestages. 1949–2002 [Biographical Handbook of the Members of the German Bundestag. 1949–2002] (in German). München: De Gruyter - De Gruyter Saur. p. 1715. ISBN 978-3-11-184511-1.
